= List of British Rail TOPS depot codes =

From the introduction of TOPS in 1973, all British Rail diesel and electric locomotives and multiple units were allocated to a particular traction maintenance depot or TMD. Drawing from the terminology of steam traction, these depots were generally referred to as "sheds", and indeed most locations were those which had possessed depots for steam locos. Each TMD had a two-character code which was originally displayed underneath the number of each locomotive allocated there. Later this was extended to cover each carriage of diesel multiple units (DMUs), and even some coaching stock; at this time additional depot codes were added covering places with coaching stock allocations, and also works locations.

== Allocations and TOPS depot codes ==
Locations given a TOPS code included all TMDs, servicing depots (where minor work such as A exams could be undertaken), and some stabling points (SPs) where locomotives or multiple units would be parked when not required. The locations varied from comprehensively equipped depots, through covered accommodation with fuelling point, to a mere siding. The use of TOPS codes for SPs was somewhat haphazard, with Machynlleth (code MN) hosting one or two locomotives on some weekends while Wolverhampton station, which had no TOPS code, stabled more than a dozen locos.

The application of a depot code was generally reliable as a guide to the base from which the locomotive or multiple unit operated but with some variations, mainly relating to shunters and departmental locomotives.

EMU depots such as Birkenhead North (BD) often required a diesel shunter for moving stock when not powered. As there was no fuelling or maintenance capability at BD, a shunter allocated to nearby Birkenhead Mollington Street (BC) was used, returning to its home depot every four weeks. This arrangement also existed at other locations such as Ilford/Stratford.

Departmental locomotives, by the nature of their use, were sometimes reported as allocated to a base location or even to a region in general rather than an official depot. The Western Region sometimes followed this practice, with number 20 (latterly 97020) reported as allocated to "Reading Signal Works" throughout the 1970s. Locomotives used for research purposes would be reported as allocated to the Derby Research Centre.

== List of TMD, Servicing Depot, SP and other non-works codes ==
TOPS code	Shed name	Origins	Comments
AB	Aberdeen Ferryhill		
AC	Aberdeen Clayhills		Carriage maintenance depot
AF	Ashford Chart Leacon		
AK	Manchester Ardwick		
AL	Aylesbury		
AN	Allerton		
AY	Ayr		
BA	Basford Hall (Crewe)		
BB	Beachbrook Farm EWS		
BC	Birkenhead Mollington Street	LNWR and GWR joint	
BC	MoD Bicester		
BC	Beachbrook Farm Freightliner		
BD	Birkenhead North	Wirral Railway	EMU depot, from BN from 1976
BE	Bedford Midland Station		No allocation - Fuelling Point only.
BG	Botanic Gardens (Hull)		
BG	Billingham		
BH	Barrow Hill (Staveley)	Midland Railway	
BI	Brighton Lovers Walk		EMU depot
BJ	Bristol Marsh Junction		DMU depot
BK	Birkenhead Central	Mersey Railway	EMU depot
BK	Bristol Barton Hill		from 1992
BL	Blyth		
BL	Basford Hall Freightliner		
BM	Bournemouth		EMU depot
BN	Birkenhead North		to BD from 1976
BN	Bounds Green		HST depot, from 1976
BP	Beattock		to 1976
BP	Blackpool		Carriage maintenance depot
BQ	Bury		EMU depot, from BV from 1975
BR	Bristol Bath Road	GWR	
BS	Bescot		
BT	Bo'ness		
BU	Burton		
BV	Bury		to BQ from 1975
BW	Barrow		
BW	Barry		
BX	Buxton		DMU depot
BY	Bletchley		
BZ	St. Blazey (Par)	Cornwall Minerals Railway	
CA	Cambridge		DMU depot
CB	Crewe Basford Hall		
CC	Clacton		EMU depot
CD	Crewe Diesel Depot		
CE	Crewe Electric Depot		
CF	Cardiff Canton		
CG	Croxley Green		EMU depot, to closure in 1985
CG	Crewe Gresty Lane	GWR	
CH	Chester		
CJ	Clapham Junction		No allocation.
CK	Corkerhill		DMU depot
CL	Carlisle Upperby		Carriage maintenance depot
CM	Camden		Carriage maintenance depot
CO	Coquelles (France)		
CP	Crewe Carriage Shed		No allocation - Fuelling Point only.
CQ	Crewe Heritage Centre	Crewe Heritage Centre	Storage Facility & Heritage Centre
CR	Colchester		
CS	Carnforth	West Coast Railways	
CV	Coalville		
CW	Cricklewood		
CZ	Central Rivers		
DA	Darnall		DMU depot
DE	Dewsbury		
DE	Dundee		
DF	Derby Fragonset		
DI	Didcot Railway Centre		
DL	Dollands Moor		No allocation.
DM	Dagenham		
DM	Dee Marsh		
DN	Darlington		
DR	Doncaster		
DT	Dunfermline Townhill		
DY	Derby Etches Park		DMU depot
EC	Edinburgh Craigentinny		HST depot Carriage Maintenance Depot
ED	Eastfield		
EG	Edge Hill		
EH	Eastleigh		
EJ	Ebbw Junction (Newport)		
EM	East Ham		EMU depot
EN	Euston Downside		Carriage maintenance depot
EU	Euston Station		
EX	Exeter St Davids		
FB	Ferrybridge		
FF	Brussels Forest (Belgium)		Eurostar depot
FH	Frodingham (Scunthorpe)		
FP	Finsbury Park		
FR	Fratton (Portsmouth)		EMU depot
FW	Fort William		
FX	Felixstowe		
GC	Cowlairs (Glasgow)		Carriage maintenance depot
GD	Gateshead		
GF	South Gosforth		DMU depot
GI	Gillingham		EMU depot
GL	Gloucester		
GM	Grangemouth		
GU	Guide Bridge		
GW	Glasgow Shields Road		Electric locomotive/EMU depot
GY	Garston Yard		
HA	Haymarket		
HD	Holyhead		
HE	Hornsey		EMU depot
HF	Hereford		
HG	Hither Green		
HI	Hitchin		
HM	Healey Mills (Wakefield)		
HN	Hamilton		DMU depot
HO	Holbeck (Leeds)		
HQ	BRB Headquarters		Paper allocation
HR	Hall Road (Liverpool)		EMU depot
HS	Hammerton Street (Bradford)		
HT	Heaton		HST and DMU depot
HY	Hyndland		EMU depot
IL	Ilford		EMU depot
IM	Immingham		
IP	Ipswich Station		No allocation - Fuelling Point only.
IS	Inverness		
KD	Carlisle Kingmoor		
KK	Kirkdale (Liverpool)		EMU depot
KM	Carlisle Yard		No allocation - Fuelling Point only.
KN	MoD Kineton		
KT	MoD Kineton		
KX	Kings Cross		No allocation - Fuelling Point only.
KY	Knottingley		
LA	Laira (Plymouth)		Intercity HST, DMU
LC	Longsight International		Eurostar depot
LE	Landore (Swansea)		
LG	Longsight Electric Depot (Manchester)		Electric locomotive and EMU depot
LJ	Llandudno Junction		
LL	Liverpool Edge Hill		Carriage maintenance depot
LM	Long Marston (MoD)		
LN	Lincoln		DMU depot
LO	Longsight Diesel Depot (Manchester)		
LP	Le Landy (Paris)		Eurostar depot, to 1994
LR	Leicester		
LV	Liverpool Street		No allocation
LY	Le Landy (Paris)		Eurostar depot, from 1994
MA	Manchester Longsight Carriage Maintenance Depot		
MB	Middlesbrough		
MD	Merehead		
ME	Marylebone		DMU depot
MG	Margam (Port Talbot)		
MH	Millerhill (Edinburgh)		
ML	Motherwell		
MN	Machynlleth		
MR	March		
MV	Manchester Victoria (Red Bank)		Carriage maintenance depot
NA	Newton Abbot	South Devon Railway	
NC	Norwich Crown Point		Carriage maintenance depot
NG	New Cross Gate		Carriage maintenance depot
NH	Newton Heath (Manchester)	Lancashire & Yorkshire Railway	DMU depot
NL	Neville Hill (Leeds)		HST and DMU depot
NT	Nottingham Carriage Sidings		
NM	Northam		
NN	Northampton		
NP	North Pole International		
NR	Norwich		
NW	Northwich		No allocation - Fuelling Point only.
OC	Old Oak Common		
OD	Old Dalby		
OH	Old Oak Common (Heathrow Express)	Heathrow Express EMU depot	
OM	Old Oak Common Carriage Maintenance Depot		
ON	Orpington		EMU depot
OO	Old Oak Common (HST)		HST depot
OX	Oxford		
OY	Oxley (Wolverhampton)		Carriage maintenance depot
PA	St Pancras		No allocation.
PB	Peterborough		
PC	Polmadie Carriage Maintenance Depot (Glasgow)		
PH	Perth Station		
PI	North Pole International		1994-1995
PM	Bristol St Phillips Marsh		HST depot
PO	Polmadie (Glasgow)		
PQ	Parkeston Quay		
PZ	Penzance		
RB	Ranelagh Bridge		No allocation - Fuelling Point only.
RE	Ramsgate		EMU depot. Changed to RM.
RG	Reading		DMU depot
RL	Ripple Lane		
RM	Ramsgate		EMU depot. Was RE.
RR	Radyr		
RS	Reddish		
RU	Rugby		
RY	Ryde		EMU depot
SA	Salisbury		
SB	Shirebrook		
SD	Selafield	Direct Rail Services	
SE	St Leonards		DEMU depot
SF	Stratford		
SG	Slade Green		EMU Depot
SI	Soho (Birmingham)		
SL	Stewarts Lane		Electric locomotive and EMU depot
SN	Stranraer		
SP	Wigan Springs Branch		
SQ	Stockport		
SR	Stratford Repair Depot		
ST	Severn Tunnel Junction		
SU	Selhurst		EMU depot
SV	Wembley Chiltern		
SW	Swindon		
SY	Saltley (Birmingham)		
SZ	Southall		DMU depot
SZ	Southampton Maritime		Freightliner
TB	Three Bridges		
TD	Temple Mills		
TE	Thornaby (Tees)		
TF	Thornton Fields (Stratford)		Carriage maintenance depot
TG	Tonbridge		
TI	Tinsley (Sheffield)		
TJ	Thornton Junction		
TL	Tilbury		
TN	Taunton		
TO	Toton		
TP	Trafford Park		
TS	Tyseley		DMU depot
TW	Tunbridge Wells West Station		DEMU depot
TY	Tyne Yard		
VR	Vale of Rheidol Railway (Aberystwyth)		Steam locomotive depot
WA	Warrington Arpley		
WB	Willesden Brent Sidings		Carriage maintenance depot
WC	Waterloo & City line		
WD	Wimbledon		EMU depot
WH	Wath		
WH	Whatley		from 1994
WJ	Watford Junction		No allocation - Fuelling Point only.
WK	Workington		
WN	Willesden		
WO	Wellingborough		No allocation - Fuelling Point only.
WS	Worcester		
WT	Westhouses		No allocation - Fuelling Point only.
WY	Westbury		
YC	York Clifton		
YK	York		

== Works codes ==
TOPS code	Works name	Origins	Comments
ZB	Doncaster Works Wabtec		
ZC	Crewe Works		
ZD	Derby Litchurch Lane Works		
ZE	Derby Locomotive Works		
ZF	Doncaster Works Bombardier transportation		
ZG	Eastleigh Works		
ZH	Glasgow Springburn Works		
ZH	Glasgow St Rollox Works		
ZI	Ilford works		Bombardier transportation.
ZL	Swindon Works		
ZN	Wolverton Works		
ZP	Horbury (Wakefield)		Bombardier transportation.
