= St Pancras Cambridge Street Diesel Sidings =

Former train stabling point in Kings Cross, London

Coordinates: 51.5374°N 0.1287°W

- Interactive map of St Pancras Cambridge Street Diesel Sidings

Location
- Location: Kings Cross, London

Characteristics
- Owner: British Rail
- Depot code: PA (1973 - 1984)
- Type: Diesel

History
- Closed: 1984

St Pancras Cambridge Street Diesel Sidings was a stabling point located in Kings Cross, London, England. The depot was situated on the Midland Main Line and was near St Pancras station.

The depot code was PA.

== History ==
Before its closure in 1984, Class 08 shunters, Class 20, 24, 25, 27, 40, 44 and 47 locomotives could be seen at the depot.
