= Thornton Junction TMD =

Railway maintenance depot in Thornton, Fife

- Interactive map of Thornton Junction TMD

Location
- Location: Thornton
- Coordinates: 56.1608°N 3.156°W
- OS grid: NT283970

Characteristics
- Owner: EWS
- Depot code: TJ (1973 -)
- Type: Diesel, DMU

History
- Opened: 1933
- Former depot code: 62A (1 February 1950 - 5 May 1973)

Thornton Junction TMD was a traction maintenance depot located in Thornton, Fife, Scotland. The depot was situated on the Fife Circle Line and was adjacent to the now-closed Thornton Junction station.

The depot code is TJ.

== History ==
The station formerly had sidings, which were closed in 1969 and replaced with the depot. Between 1956 and 1970, the sidings were used to stable Class 05, 06 and 08 shunters, as well as Class 11, 20 and 27 locomotives. In 1987, the depot had an allocation of Class 20, 25, 26, 27 locomotives, along with a withdrawn Class 104 DMU. The DMU has since been scrapped.

== Present ==
The depot is now closed.
