= Wath TMD =

Former railway maintenance depot in Wath-upon-Dearness, South Yorkshire

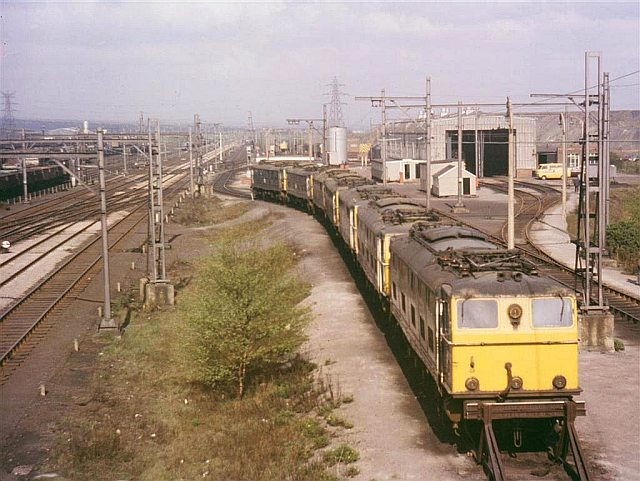
- A line of Class 76 1500 V DC locomotives outside Wath depot in March 1976
- Interactive map of Wath TMD

Location
- Location: Wath-upon-Dearne, South Yorkshire
- Coordinates: 53.5088°N 1.3463°W
- OS grid: SE434015

Characteristics
- Owner: British Rail
- Depot code: WH (1973 -)
- Type: Diesel

History
- Closed: 1983
- Former depot code: 36B (1 April 1952 - 30 June 1958) 41F (1 July 1958 - 3 November 1963) 41C (4 November 1963 - 5 May 1973)

Wath TMD was a motive power depot located in Wath upon Dearne, South Yorkshire, England. The depot was located near Wath station.

The depot code is WH.

== History ==
From 1963 to 1982, Class 08 shunters, Class 20, Class 25, Class 30, Class 31, Class 37, Class 40, Class 47 and 56, and Class 76 locomotives could be seen at the depot.
