= Burton Depot =

Disused railway maintenance depot in Burton upon Trent, Staffordshire

- Interactive map of Burton Depot

Location
- Location: Burton upon Trent, Staffordshire
- Coordinates: 52.8011°N 1.645°W
- OS grid: SK236226

Characteristics
- Owner: British Rail
- Depot code: BU (1973 -)
- Type: Diesel

History
- Opened: 1840
- Closed: 1968

Burton TMD was a traction maintenance depot located in Burton upon Trent, Staffordshire, England. The depot was situated on the Midland Main Line and was near Burton-on-Trent station.

The depot code was BU.

== History ==
Before its closure in 1968, Class 02, 03, 08 and 25 locomotives could be seen at the depot.
