= Westhouses Locomotive Depot =

Former railway maintenance depot in Westhouses, Derbyshire

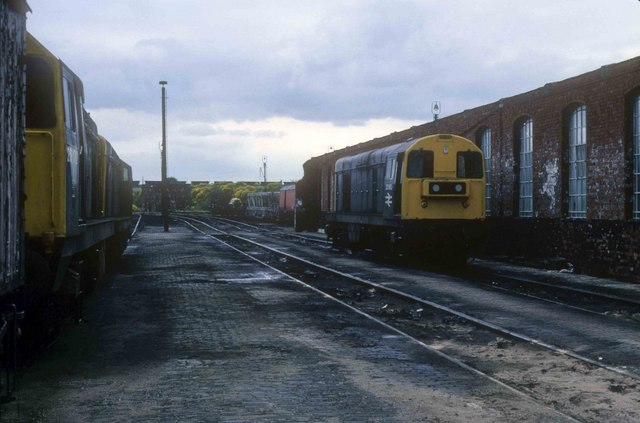
- A Class 20 stabled at the depot
- Interactive map of Westhouses Locomotive Depot

Location
- Location: Westhouses, Derbyshire
- Coordinates: 53.1144°N 1.3634°W
- OS grid: SK427576

Characteristics
- Owner: British Rail
- Depot code: WT (1975 - 1987)
- Type: Diesel

History
- Opened: 1890
- Closed: 1987
- Former depot code: 16G (1 September 1963 - 3 October 1966) WU (6 May 1973 - 4 January 1975)

Westhouses Locomotive Depot was a traction maintenance depot located in Westhouses, Derbyshire, England.

The depot's TOPS code was WT.

== History ==
From March 1966 to November 1966, Class 11 locomotives were stabled here but they were sent to Newton Heath and Crewe Diesel TMD. Class 20, 25, 47 and 56 locomotives were also stabled here. After a Class 56 derailed in the shed yard, a decision was taken to close the lines into the shed and the staff were moved to Tibshelf Sidings where locomotives continued to service mid week.
