= Blyth Cambois TMD =

Former diesel locomotive depot in Northumberland, England

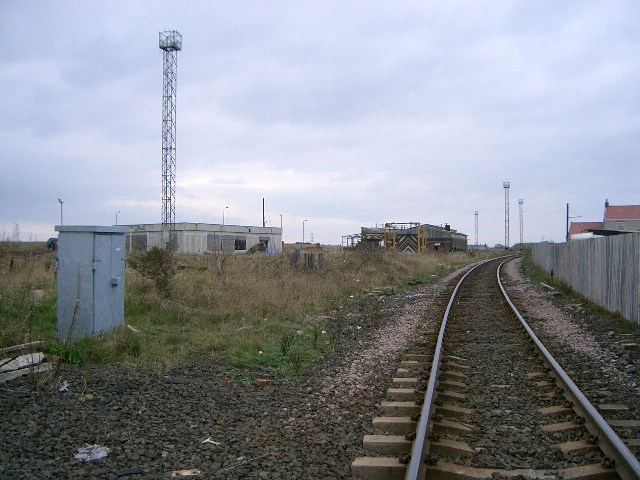
- The disused depot in 2006
- Interactive map of Blyth Cambois TMD

Location
- Location: Blyth, Northumberland
- Coordinates: 55.1513°N 1.5255°W
- OS grid: NZ303841

Characteristics
- Owner: British Rail
- Depot code: BL (1973-1994)
- Type: Diesel

History
- Opened: 1968
- Closed: September 1994

Blyth Cambois TMD was a traction maintenance depot located in Blyth, Northumberland, England. The depot was situated on the west side of the branch line from Bedlington Junction to Blyth Docks.

The depot code, under TOPS, was BL.

== History ==
Coal had been exported from the south side of the River Blyth since before the arrival of the railways in 1845, and had reached over 6,000,000 tonnes (6,600,000 tons) per year by 1963. The pattern of trains feeding the coal staithes at Blyth from around the North East required many steam locomotives to enable this operation to happen.

A diesel depot was built and opened in Blyth in 1968; it replaced earlier facilities at Percy Main, North Blyth and South Blyth, which were all traditional steam sheds. Although diesel locomotives had been around since the late 1950s/early 1960s, with the run-down of steam power on British Railways the steam sheds were closed in favour of a new shed, Cambois (pronounced cammis), which was a one mile (1.6 km) to the north. Throughout the 1970s and 1980s class 20s and class 37s were the staple motive power at the depot, but by 1981 Class 56 locomotives were the usual locomotives.

By the middle of the 1980s, nine class 56s and one class 08 shunter were required to operate the twenty train diagrams worked per day. However, the effects of the miners' strike and the mass closure of the collieries in the north east in the early 1990s took their toll on the traffic to and from Blyth. By 1987 Blyth was a sub-shed of Toton in Nottinghamshire, but was able to undertake simple examinations on locomotives rather than having to send them elsewhere for maintenance purposes.

The depot was closed in 1994, when Loadhaul, the freight company operating in the area, concentrated its crew signing-on point and TMD (Traction Maintenance Depot) at Tyne Yard, south of Newcastle. The shed at Sunderland Dock closed too. The depot building was demolished between 2006 and 2010.

== Sources ==
- Webster, Neil; Greengrass, Robert; Greaves, Simon (1987). British Rail Depot Directory. Metro Enterprises Ltd. ISBN 9780947773076. OCLC 20420397.
- Fisher, Alex (February 2020). "Blyth Cambois Depot". Railways Illustrated. Vol. 18, no. 2. Stamford: Key Publishing. ISSN 1479-2230.
