= Westbury DMU Servicing Depot =

Railway maintenance depot in Westbury, Wiltshire

- Interactive map of Westbury DMU Servicing Depot

Location
- Location: Westbury, Wiltshire
- Coordinates: 51°15′50″N 2°12′5″W
- OS grid: ST859517

Characteristics
- Owner: Great Western Railway
- Depot code: WY (1973 -)
- Type: DMU

Westbury DMU Servicing Depot is a traction maintenance depot located in Westbury, Wiltshire, England. The depot is situated on the Reading to Taunton line and is near Westbury station.

The depot code is WY.

== History ==
Class 08 shunters were allocated to the depot between 1961 and 1968.

== Present ==
As of 2016, the depot has no allocation. It is, instead, a stabling point for Great Western Railway Class 150 Sprinters.
