= Hamilton TMD =

Disused railway maintenance depot in Hamilton, South Lanarkshire

- Interactive map of Hamilton TMD

Location
- Location: Hamilton, South Lanarkshire
- Coordinates: 55.780°N 4.0491°W
- OS grid: NS716559

Characteristics
- Owner: British Rail
- Depot code: HN (1973 - 1982)
- Type: DMU, Diesel

History
- Opened: 1884
- Closed: 1982

Hamilton TMD was a traction maintenance depot located in Hamilton, South Lanarkshire, Scotland. The depot was situated on the Argyle Line and was near Hamilton West station.

== History ==
Before its closure in 1982, Class 06 and 08 shunters and Class 101, 107 and 116 DMUs could be seen at the depot.
