= Perth Carriage Servicing Depot =

Railway maintenance depot in Perth, Perth and Kinross

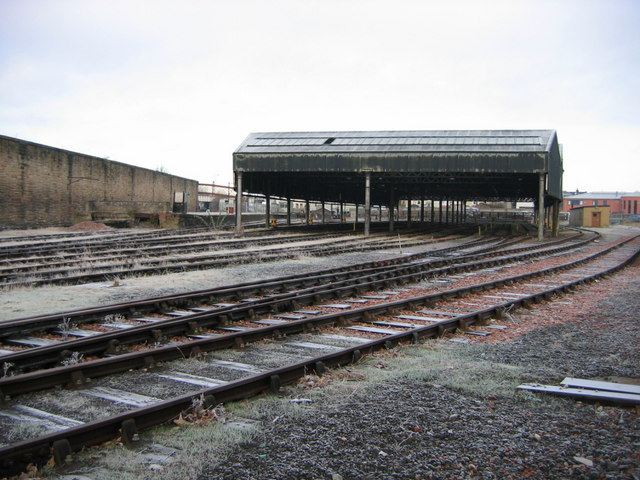
- Perth Depot in 2005
- Interactive map of Perth Carriage Servicing Depot

Location
- Location: Perth, Perthshire
- Coordinates: 56.3934°N 3.4398°W
- OS grid: NO112233

Characteristics
- Owner: ScotRail
- Depot code: PH (1973 -)
- Type: Diesel

History
- Opened: 1938
- Former depot code: 63A (2 January 1948 - 5 May 1973)

Perth Carriage Servicing Depot is a depot and stabling point located in Perth, Perthshire, Scotland. The depot is on the eastern side of the Highland Main Line, adjacent to Perth station.

The depot code is PH.

== History ==
The building was opened by the Caledonian Railway, prior to 1901, as a carriage shed. From 1958 to 1972, Class 06 and 08 shunters and Class 21 locomotives could be seen at the depot.

== Present ==
The depot has an allocation of Network Rail's Snow Train, including support coach ADB 977869.
