= Eastfield TMD =

Former locomotive depot in Glasgow, Scotland

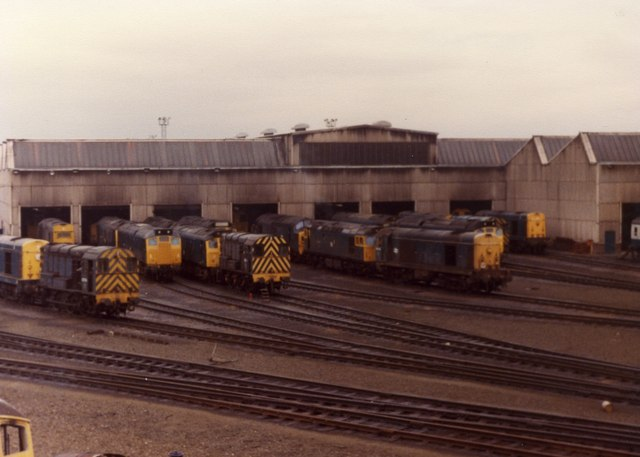
- A mixture of diesel locomotives stabled at the depot in 1979
- Interactive map of Eastfield TMD

Location
- Location: Glasgow, Scotland
- Coordinates: 55.8911°N 4.2403°W
- OS grid: NS599687

Characteristics
- Depot code: ED (1973-)
- Type: Diesel, DMU

History
- Closed: Early 1990s, reopened 2004
- BR region: Scottish Region
- Former depot code: 65A (1948-1973)

Eastfield TMD was a railway traction maintenance depot situated in Glasgow, Scotland. Eastfield was a steam shed under British Railways with the depot code 65A; the diesel depot was coded as ED under the TOPS scheme from 1973. It was rebuilt in 2004 after closure in the 1990s.

== History ==
In 1987, the allocation of the depot included Classes 20, 26, 27, 37 and 47, and DMU Classes 101 and 104. Meanwhile, Class 08 shunters were also stabled. At that time, the depot had a wheel lathe and two snowploughs. The depot's logo is commonly noted as having been a Scottie dog, however it was more closely reflective of a West Highland White Terrier.

The depot was closed in the early 1990s and the buildings demolished. All locomotives were reallocated to other depots. In the early 2000s a new depot was built by First ScotRail, but on a smaller scale to service Classes 158 and 170 DMUs.
