= Exeter TMD =

Traction maintenance depot in England

Exeter
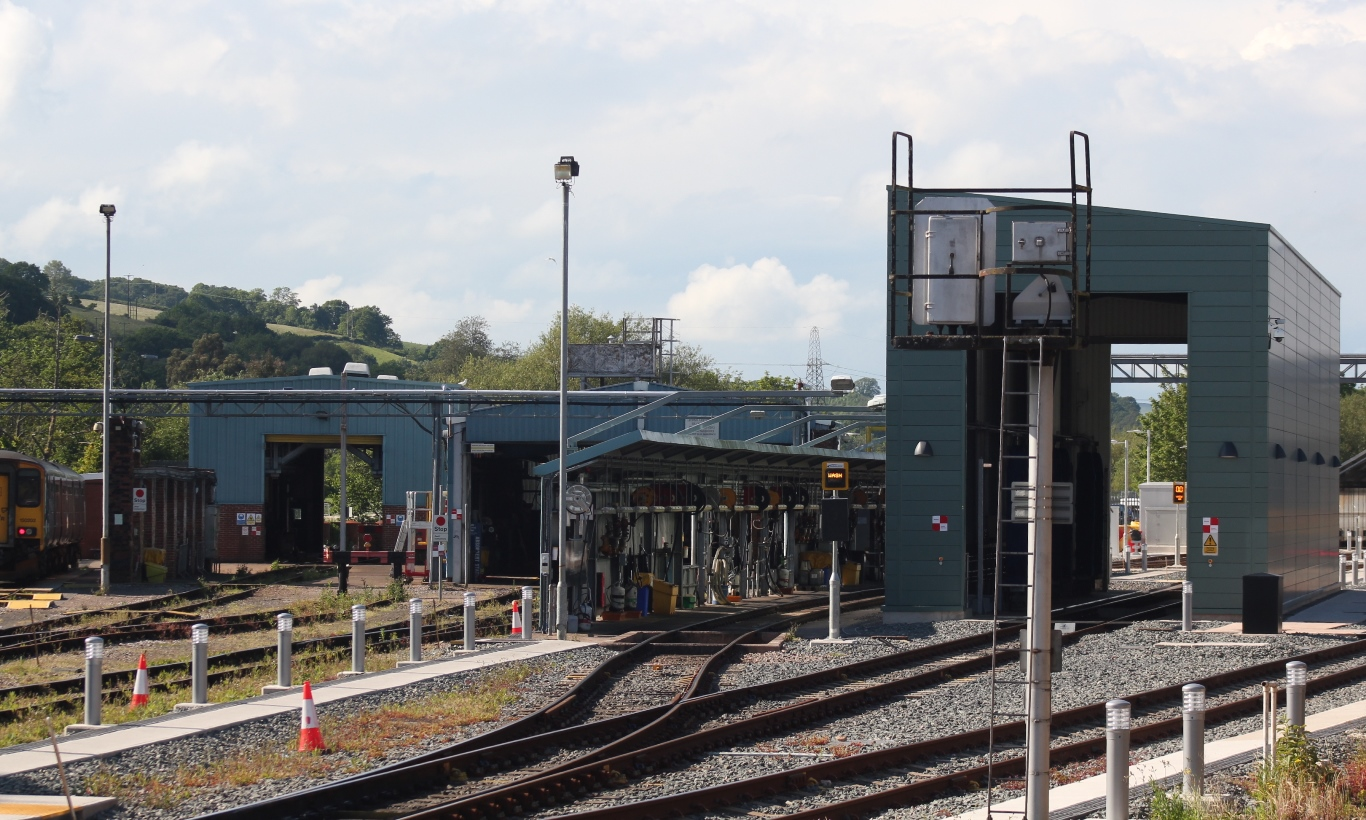
- The depot in 2021
- Interactive map of Exeter

Location
- Location: Exeter, Devon
- Coordinates: 50.7300°N 3.5452°W

Characteristics
- Operator: Great Western Railway
- Depot code: 1. EXE (GWR); 2. 83C (1950-1963); 3. EX (1976 - date)

History
- Opened: 1844
- Original: Bristol and Exeter Railway
- Pre-grouping: GWR
- Post-grouping: GWR

Exeter Traction Maintenance Depot (or Exeter TMD) is a railway Traction Maintenance Depot situated in Exeter, Devon, United Kingdom and is next to the city's main St Davids station. The depot is operated by Great Western Railway and has an allocation of diesel multiple units.

The first engine shed on the site opened in 1844 and had an allocation of locomotives until 1963. It was rebuilt in 1976 but a larger three-road maintenance building and staff accommodation was opened in 2021.

== History ==
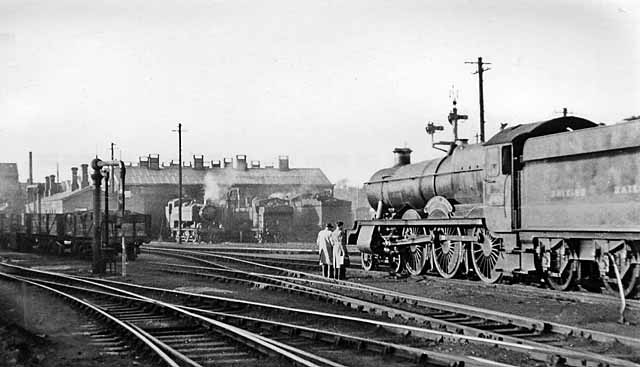
Exeter St David's Locomotive Depot 12 April 1953

An engine shed was opened at Exeter by the Bristol and Exeter Railway when it opened the line to here in 1844. A second facility was added a few years later by the South Devon Railway and the two were combined under the Great Western Railway (GWR) in 1876. The Bristol and Exeter had been worked by the GWR until 1849 but then purchased its own locomotives. Temporary workshops for these were built at Exeter but a permanent facility at Bristol was opened in 1851.

When British Railways introduced new shed codes in 1950, Exeter-based locomotives carried an oval cast plate with the code '83C'. The last locomotives based here were sent elsewhere from 14 October 1963, but the shed area was kept as a fueling and stabling point for locomotives and diesel multiple units (DMUs) working in the area. From 29 December 1976 it was recognised as a depot again, even though no locomotives were allocated there at the time, and given a new code 'EX'. The shed was used for many years without a roof, but in 1980 a new covered maintenance area was built. New facilities were provided at the depot in 2011, including a new fueling point, and also jacks so that DMUs do not have to be sent empty to Bristol when they require lifting.

It was announced in January 2018 that £40 million was being invested into a new train maintenance depot at Exeter to allow expansion to the existing depot and fleet.' Completion was delayed due to engineering problems and the COVID-19 pandemic but was completed in 2021 having cost £56 million.

== Description ==
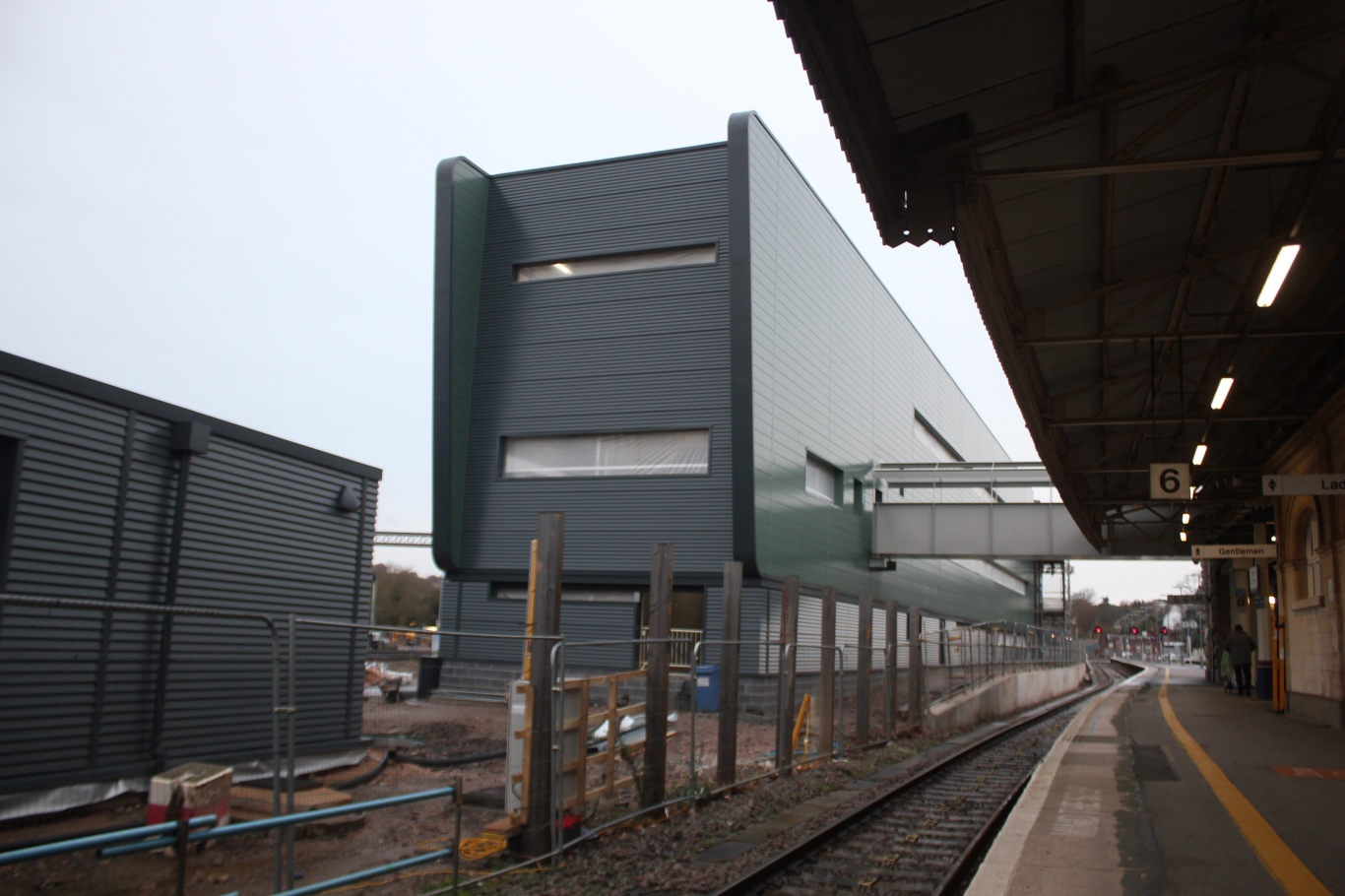
The new depot buildings taking shape in 2019

The new depot building which opened in 2021 has a three-storey block accommodating staff and their facilities opposite platform 6 of St Davids station. Behind this is a three-road maintenance shed. Two roads can take a five-car train while the shorter road for three-car trains is equipped with lifting jacks and a crane. There are stabling sidings alongside the maintenance shed and the old 1980 shed. There is also a train wash and fuelling facilities

== Allocation ==
In the 1920s there was a mixture of tank locomotives for local services and small tender engines for longer distance services. For example in 1921 there were 35 locomotives (including 517 Class 0-4-2Ts, 1976 Class 0-6-0PTs, 2301 Class 0-6-0s, 4000 'Star' Class 4-6-0 and 4300 Class 2-6-0s) plus a single railmotor. The last steam locomotives were taken away in 1963.

The depot's fleet of DMUs at the start of 2010 comprised 74 coaches formed as:

- 6 two-car Class 142 'Pacer' units
- 8 two-car Class 143 'Pacer' units
- 17 two-car Class 150/2 units
- 12 single-car Class 153 units

The Class 142s had been based here since December 2007, on lease from Northern Rail. They were returned in November and December 2011 after second-hand Class 150/1 sets were received from London Midland. The Class 143s were transferred from St Philip's Marsh to Exeter in December 2008, but three of the units worked in the Bristol area each day for several years on services on the Severn Beach Line and the Bristol to Taunton Line, returning to Exeter every other day for servicing.

By 2021 the fleet had become

- 20 two-car Class 150/2 units
- 11 two-car Class 158 units

The depot is also visited by Class 165 and Class 166 'Networker' units. The longer roads of the new shed can accommodate five-car Class 800 or Class 802 or four-coach Class 255 trains but they are not routinely scheduled to visit the depot for maintenance.

== See also ==
- Exmouth Junction – the London and South Western Railway shed in Exeter
- List of British Railways shed codes
- List of British Rail TOPS depot codes
