= Frodingham TMD =

Railway maintenance depot in Frodingham, Lincolnshire

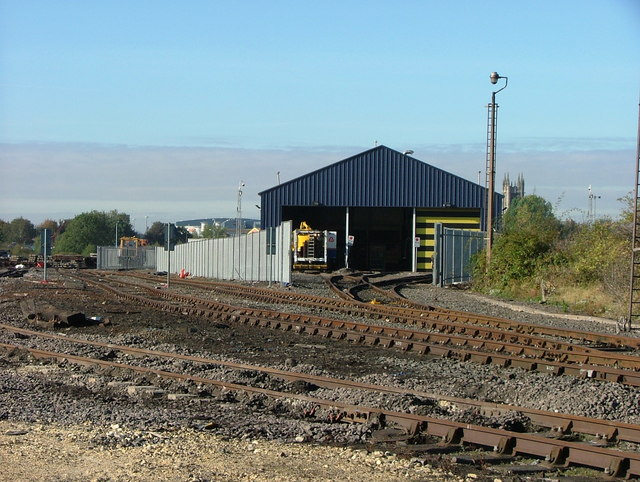
- Frodingham TMD seen in 2007
- Interactive map of Frodingham TMD

Location
- Location: Frodingham, Scunthorpe
- Coordinates: 53.5919°N 0.6349°W
- OS grid: SE904114

Characteristics
- Owner: Freightliner
- Depot code: FH (1973 -)
- Type: Diesel

History
- Former depot code: 36C (1 February 1950 - 5 May 1973)

Frodingham TMD is a traction maintenance depot located in Frodingham, Scunthorpe, England. The depot is situated on the northern side of the South Humberside Main Line and is to the east of Scunthorpe station.

The depot code is FH.

== History ==
From 1958 to 1991, Class 08 shunters and Class 10 locomotives could be seen at the depot. Until 1987, the depot had an allocation of Class 08 shunters. Around 1987, Classes 20, 31, 37, 45, 47 and 56 locomotives could also be seen stabled at the depot.

== Present ==
The site was taken over by GrantRail in 1999. In 2004 the old depot building was demolished. A new depot was built nearby and is now operated by VolkerRail (pka GrantRail) for maintenance of on-track machines and road-railers.

== Bibliography ==
- Marsden, Colin J. (1987). BR Depots. Motive power recognition. Vol. 6. Ian Allan Ltd. ISBN 9780711017191. OCLC 18685680.
- Webster, Neil; Greengrass, Robert; Greaves, Simon (1987). British Rail Depot Directory. Metro Enterprises Ltd. ISBN 9780947773076. OCLC 20420397.
