= Shirebrook TMD =

Former railway maintenance depot in Shirebrook, Derbyshire

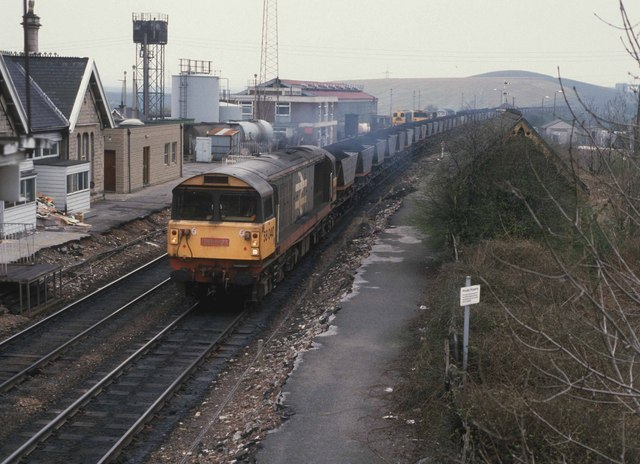
- Seen in 1988, Shirebrook's depot buildings are visible behind the coal train passing the closed Shirebrook West station
- Interactive map of Shirebrook TMD

Location
- Location: Shirebrook, Derbyshire
- Coordinates: 53.203°N 1.2016°W
- OS grid: SK534676

Characteristics
- Owner: British Rail
- Depot code: SB (1973 - 1996)
- Type: Diesel

History
- Opened: 1965
- Closed: 1996
- Former depot code: 41J (8 February 1966 - 5 May 1973)

Shirebrook TMD was a traction maintenance depot located in Shirebrook, Derbyshire, England. The depot was situated on the freight-only line between Pye Bridge Junction and Shirebrook Junction, which is now part of the Robin Hood Line. The depot was on the east side of the line, adjacent to the closed Shirebrook West station.

The depot code was SB.

== History ==
At various times between 1966 and 2005, Class 08 shunters, Class 10, and Classes 20, 37, 47, 56 and 58 locomotives could be seen stabled at the depot. The depot had an allocation of Class 08 shunters until 1988.

== Bibliography ==
- Marsden, Colin J. (1987). BR Depots. Motive power recognition. Vol. 6. Ian Allan Ltd. ISBN 9780711017191. OCLC 18685680.
- Webster, Neil; Greengrass, Robert; Greaves, Simon (1987). British Rail Depot Directory. Metro Enterprises Ltd. ISBN 9780947773076. OCLC 20420397.
