= Longsight Diesel TMD =

Traction maintenance depot in Manchester, England

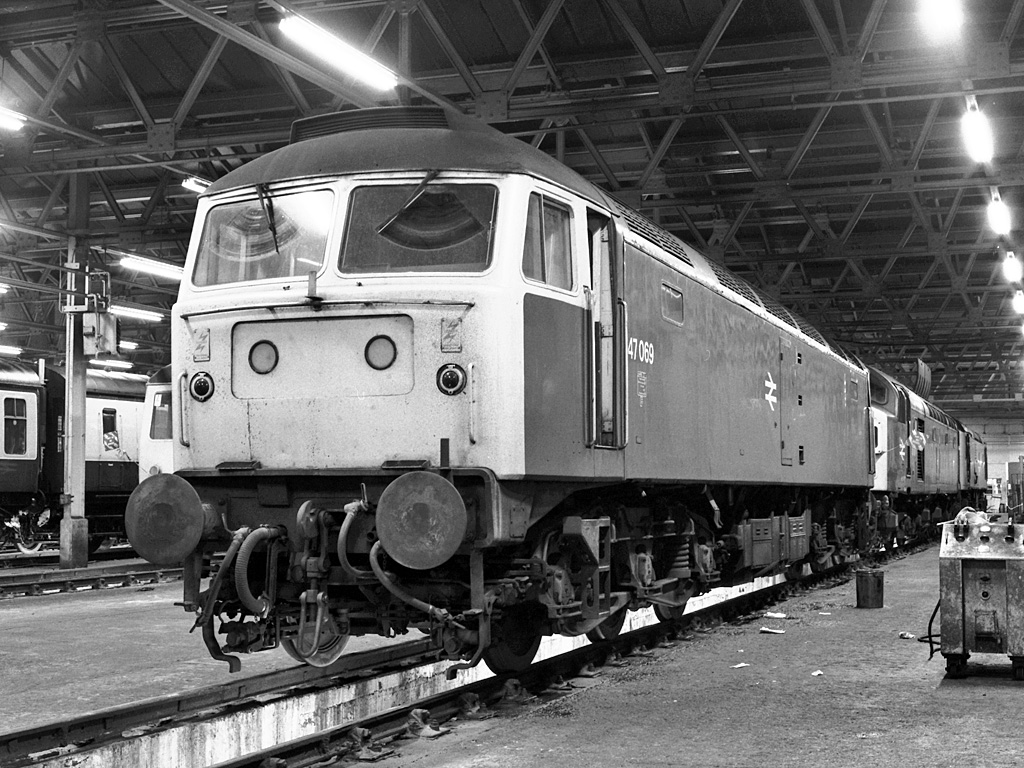
- A Class 47 locomotive inside the depot
- Interactive map of Longsight Diesel TMD

Location
- Location: Longsight, Manchester, England
- Coordinates: 53.4647°N 2.2026°W
- OS grid: SJ865964

Characteristics
- Depot code: LO (1973-present)
- Type: Diesel locomotives, diesel multiple units

History
- BR region: London Midland Region
- Former depot code: 9A (1948-73)

Longsight Diesel TMD is a railway diesel traction maintenance depot (TMD) in Longsight, south Manchester, England. It is located 1 1/2 mi (2.4 km) south of Manchester Piccadilly on the eastern side of a spur of the West Coast Main Line to Stockport.

== History ==
The Birmingham & Manchester Railway Company built the railway from Manchester to Longsight in 1836, completing the line to Birmingham by 1842. The company commissioned the construction of a number of buildings at a depot to be built at Longsight; its plan was to locate a locomotive works and an engine shed there. The original engine shed was a hexagonal roundhouse, which was later replaced by a straight shed next to the main line.

In 1905, a new shed was built at Longsight and a new 50 ft (15 m) turntable was installed. Two years later, a second was built at the north end of the yard, along with a 950 ft (290 m) carriage shed with 13 roads. By 1912, Longsight was home to more than 200 steam locomotives.

The depot passed to the London Midland and Scottish Railway in 1923; additions were made in 1934, including a coaling plant, two ash plants and a 60 ft (18 m) turntable. Steam locomotives continued to be located at Longsight until 1963, but dieselisation had already begun in the late 1950s.

== Depot allocation ==
In 1979, Longsight supplied ten shunters to several different locations:

- Locally, three air-braked locomotive covered operations as depot pilots, at Mayfield parcels depot and Trafford Park rail freight terminal
- Five were outstationed to Guide Bridge Sidings working Dewsnap Yard and Ashburys Yard
- One worked Stockport Carriage Sidings
- One operated freight trips at Buxton TMD.

At this time, Longsight had an allocation of 14 Class 08 shunters, 19 Class 25 and 40 Class 40 diesel locomotives, with diesel multiple units (DMUs) of Classes 100 and 108. By the following year, there were no passenger train duties planned for Class 25 locomotives based at Longsight, but there were a variety of diagrams for Class 40s predominantly on summer-only services from Manchester to destinations in North Wales.

By 1985, there were seven Class 31s, which had replaced the Class 25s; the Class 40 fleet had been largely withdrawn, ending its long association with Longsight. The allocation of Class 08 shunters had risen to 17, although one of these was stored in an unserviceable condition. All of the DMU allocation had also been moved away, but two Class 118s that were being converted for parcels use were provisionally shown as allocated to Longsight. No passenger trains were now diagrammed for haulage by diesel locomotives based at Longsight.

In 1986, the only locomotives allocated to Longsight depot were 14 Class 08 shunters; the other classes had been reallocated elsewhere or withdrawn. The two-car Class 118 units that had been converted for parcels use were also based here. Classes 31 and 47 could also be seen stabled at the depot.

== See also ==
- Longsight Electric TMD
