= Blackpool North Carriage Maintenance Depot =

Railway maintenance depot in Blackpool, Lancashire

Blackpool Train Maintenance Depot
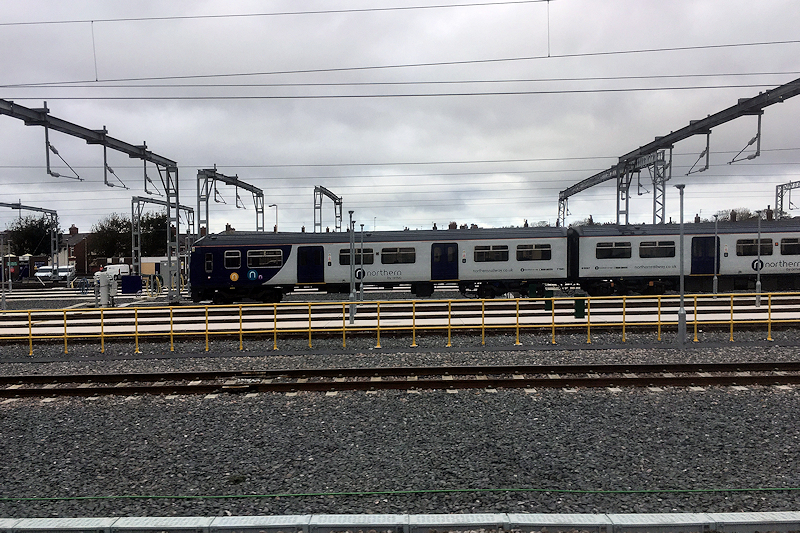
- Depot sidings after electrification (2018)
- Interactive map of Blackpool Train Maintenance Depot

Location
- Location: Blackpool, Lancashire, England
- Coordinates: 53.8276°N 3.0435°W
- OS grid: SD313373

Characteristics
- Owner: Network Rail
- Operator: Northern Trains
- Depot code: BP
- Type: DMU, EMU

Blackpool Train Maintenance Depot is a traction maintenance depot located in Blackpool, Lancashire, England. Blackpool TMD's TOPS code is BP and it is operated by Northern Trains.

== Description ==
Blackpool TMD is located north-east of Blackpool North Railway Station, and is situated on the Blackpool branch line from Preston.

The depot consists of sidings for the maintenance of electric trains, including a carriage wash machine and automatic sanding system.

Stabling and light maintenance is provided for Class 150/1, 150/2 and Class 156 Sprinters, Class 158 Express Sprinters DMUs.

== History ==
In 1987, the depot had no allocation but was used for stabling DMUs and Classes 08 and 47 locomotives.

In 2018, as part of the Great North Rail Project, the Blackpool branch line between Blackpool and Preston was electrified. The depot was completely remodelled, allowing it to cater for both electric and diesel trains. During this period the depot was relocated to a temporary site in Leyland.
