= Bedford Carriage Sidings =

Railway maintenance depot in Bedford, Bedfordshire

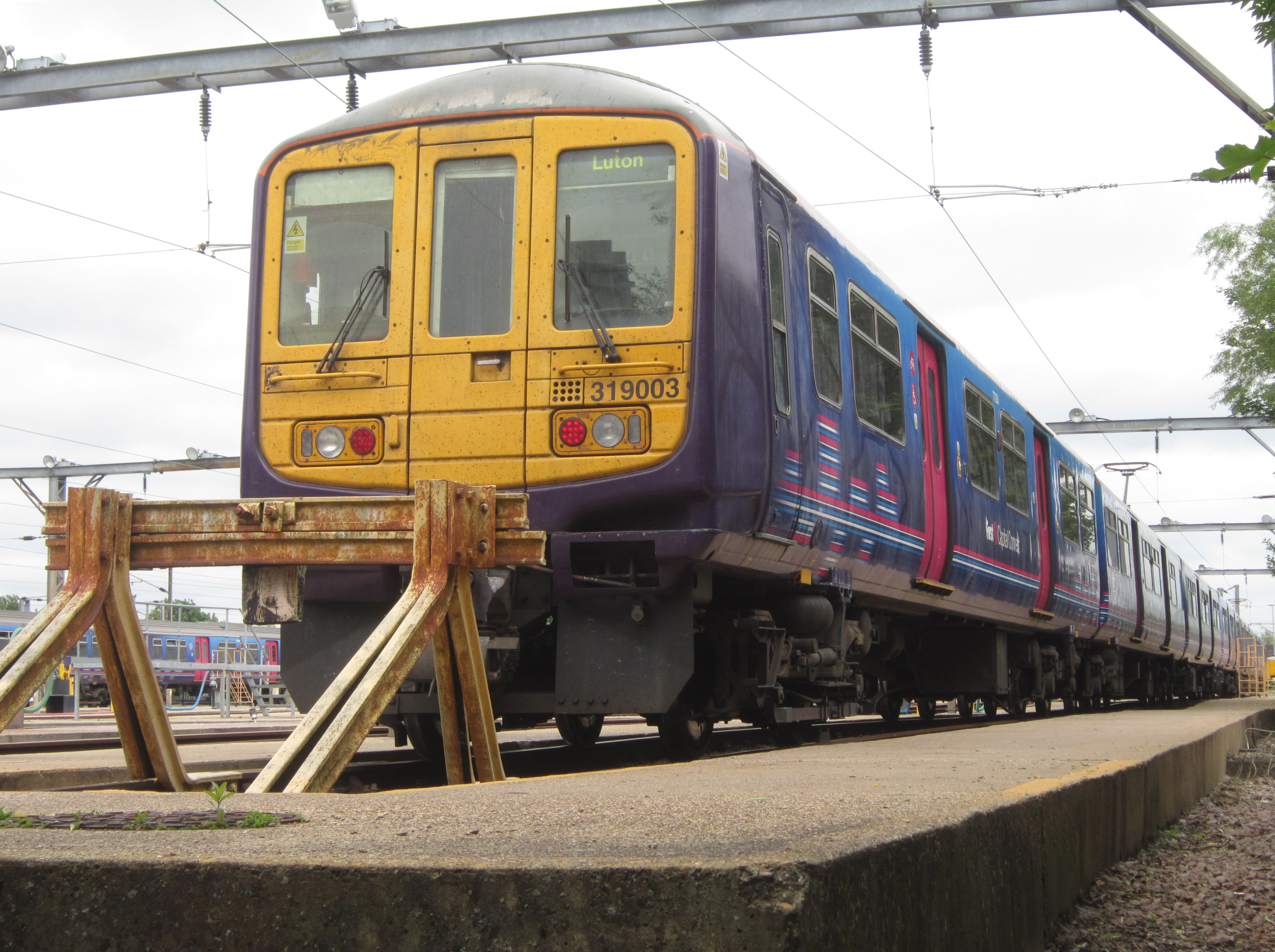

Location
- Location: Bedford, Bedfordshire
- Coordinates: 52.1235°N 0.4766°W
- OS grid: TL043493

Characteristics
- Owner: Network Rail
- Operator: Thameslink
- Type: EMU

History
- Former depot code: 15D (1 January 1948 - 31 March 1958) 14E (1 April 1958 - 31 August 1963) 14C (1 September 1963 - 5 May 1973)

Bedford Carriage Sidings are located in Bedford, Bedfordshire, England on the Midland Main Line, near Bedford station.

== History ==
The former steam engine shed was situated on the Down side of the main line. The depot code was BE.

From January to March 1964, Class 08 shunters and Class 27 locomotives could be seen.

== Present ==
The sidings on the Up side of the mainline provide stabling for Thameslink Class 377 and Class 700 EMUs.

Trains are serviced and repaired at the nearby Bedford Cauldwell Walk depot.

Driver depots for Thameslink and Freightliner drivers are located in nearby buildings.
