= Marylebone Up Tunnel Sidings =

Train stabling point in Marylebone, London

- Interactive map of Marylebone Up Tunnel Sidings

Location
- Location: Marylebone, London
- Coordinates: 51.5290°N 0.1681°W
- OS grid: TQ270829

Characteristics
- Owner: Chiltern Railways
- Depot code: ME (1973 -)
- Type: DMU

Marylebone Up Tunnel Sidings is a stabling point located in Marylebone, London, England. The depot is situated on the Chiltern Main Line and is on the east side of the line to the north of London Marylebone station.

The depot code is ME.

== Allocation ==
As of 2018, stabling is provided for Chiltern Railway Class 165 Turbos.

== Bibliography ==
- Webster, Neil; Greengrass, Robert; Greaves, Simon (1987). British Rail Depot Directory. Metro Enterprises Ltd. ISBN 9780947773076. OCLC 20420397.
