= Ranelagh Bridge Yard =

Former railway maintenance depot

Coordinates: 51°31′09″N 0°11′08″W

Characteristics
- Owner: British Rail
- Depot code: RB (1973–1980)
- Type: DMU

History
- Opened: 1907
- Closed: 1980

Ranelagh Bridge Yard was a locomotive stabling point located near London Paddington station.

== History ==
Before its closure in 1980, Class 31, 47, 50 and 52 locomotives could be seen at the depot.
