= Norwich Station Carriage Servicing Point =

Railway maintenance depot in Norwich, Norfolk

Coordinates: 52.622°N 1.317°E

Norwich Station Carriage Servicing Depot
- Interactive map of Norwich Station Carriage Servicing Depot

Location
- Location: Norwich, Norfolk

Characteristics
- Owner: Greater Anglia
- Depot code: NR (1973 -)
- Type: DMU

History
- Former depot code: 32A (1948 - May 1973)

Norwich Station Carriage Servicing Depot is a stabling point located in Norwich, Norfolk, England. The depot is situated on the Great Eastern Main Line and is near Norwich Station.

The depot code is NR.

== Present ==
As of 2016, the depot has no allocation. It is, instead, a stabling point for East Midlands Trains Class 158 Express Sprinters and Greater Anglia Class 153/156 Sprinters and Class 170 Turbostars.
