= Southall DMU Depot =

Traction maintenance depot in Southall, London, England

- Interactive map of Southall DMU Depot

Location
- Location: Southall, London
- Coordinates: 51.5068°N 0.3705°W
- OS grid: TQ131799

Characteristics
- Owner: British Rail
- Depot code: SZ (1973 – 1975)

History
- Opened: 1884
- Closed: 1975
- Former depot code: 81C (1 February 1950 – 5 May 1973)

Southall DMU Depot was a traction maintenance depot located in Southall, London, England. The depot is situated on the Great Western Main Line and is near Southall station.

The depot code is SZ.

== History ==
Before its closure in 1975, Class 08 shunters and Class 117 DMUs could be seen at the depot.

== Present ==
After British Rail closed the depot, it wasn't used for another 18 years until the electrification programme for Heathrow Express was introduced, when it was used as a base. The site is currently known as Southall Railway Centre.
