= Thornton's Field Carriage Sidings =

Former train stabling point in Stratford, London

- Interactive map of Thornton's Field Carriage Sidings

Location
- Location: Stratford, London
- Coordinates: 51.5332°N 0.0184°W
- OS grid: TQ375834

Characteristics
- Owner: Abellio Greater Anglia
- Depot code: TF (1973 - 2008)
- Type: Diesel, EMU

History
- Closed: 2008

Thornton's Field Carriage Sidings was a stabling point located in Stratford, London, England. The depot was situated on the north side of the Great Eastern Main Line, between Bethnal Green and Stratford stations.

The depot code was TF.

== History ==
Before its closure in 2008, Class 47 locomotives and Class 321 EMUs could be seen at the depot.

== Present ==
The replacement stabling point is located on the old Temple Mills yard land, and known as Orient Way Carriage Sidings. This was when Thornton Fields closed in 2008 making way for the 2012 Olympics site, where now the Arcelormittal Orbit and UCL campus are situated.
