= Tunbridge Wells West DEMU Depot =

Former railway maintenance depot in Tunbridge Wells, Kent

- Interactive map of Tunbridge Wells West DEMU Depot

Location
- Location: Tunbridge Wells, Kent
- Coordinates: 51.1233°N 0.2536°E
- OS grid: TQ577385

Characteristics
- Owner: British Rail
- Depot code: TW (1973 - 1985)
- Type: DEMU (Formally Steam)
- Roads: 4 (formally 2)
- Routes served: Polegate - Eridge (Cuckoo line) Lewes - Tunbridge Wells (Wealden line) Three Bridges - Tunbridge Wells The Oxted Line

History
- Opened: 1866
- Closed: 1985
- Original: [LBSCR]
- Post-grouping: [Southern Railways]
- BR region: [Southern Region]
- Former depot code: 75F (1 February 1950 - 5 May 1973)

Tunbridge Wells West DEMU Depot (formally known as Tunbridge Wells West Engine Shed) was a traction maintenance depot located at Tunbridge Wells, Kent, England. It was made to serve Tunbridge Wells West and its connecting lines and is now the main depot and station of the Spa Valley Railway.

== History ==
The depot originally opened in 1866 by the London, Brighton & South Coast Railway with two roads which could hold six locomotives south of the station. By 1891, the depot was replaced by a larger four road shed north of the station.

Following bomb damage on 20th November 1940 during World War 2, the original slate roof of the shed was replaced with corrugated asbestos. From 1950, The depot would get the code of 75F.

In June 1965, The depot closed for steam engines. Instead, the depot would store Class 205, Class 207s and other DEMUs as well as engineering trains until the later 1970s. In 1973 the depot would get its new code of TW.

The depot closed six weeks after the final line between Tunbridge Wells West and Eridge closed in 1985.

In the 1990s, The Tunbridge Wells & Eridge Railway Preservation Society would get ownership of the depot from Sainsburys (who were building a supermarket on the old land of the station). Half of the depot has been restored with the other half being turned into Tunbridge Wells West on the Spa Valley Railway
