= Aylesbury DMU Depot =

Railway maintenance depot in Aylesbury, Buckinghamshire

Aylesbury TMD
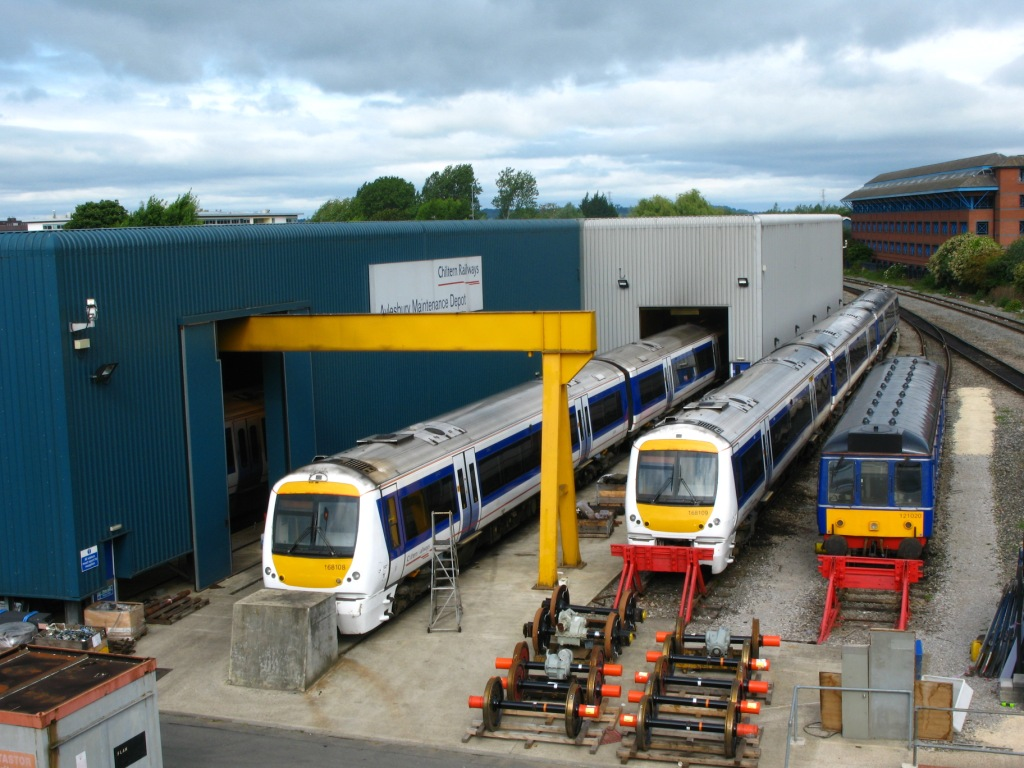
- Interactive map of Aylesbury TMD

Location
- Location: Aylesbury, Buckinghamshire
- Coordinates: 51.8143°N 0.8179°W
- OS grid: SP815135

Characteristics
- Owner: Chiltern Railways
- Depot code: AL
- Type: DMU, Diesel, Coach

Aylesbury TMD is a traction maintenance depot located in Aylesbury, Buckinghamshire, England. The depot is situated on the London to Aylesbury Line and is to the west of Aylesbury station.

== History ==
Up until 2017, the depot had an allocation of Class 121 Bubble Cars until these were withdrawn from regular passenger service.

== Allocation ==
From 2020, the depot's allocation includes Class 165 Networkers and Class 168 Clubmans.
