= Wembley (Chiltern) Light Maintenance Depot =

Light maintenance depot in Wembley, London

Wembley Light Maintenance Depot
- Interactive map of Wembley Light Maintenance Depot

Location
- Location: Wembley, London
- Coordinates: 51.5541°N 0.2783°W
- OS grid: TQ194853

Characteristics
- Owner: Chiltern Railways
- Depot code: SV
- Type: DMU

History
- Opened: 2005

Wembley Light Maintenance Depot is a traction maintenance depot located in Wembley, London, England. The depot is situated on the Chiltern Main Line and is east of Wembley Stadium station.

== Allocation ==
As of 2026, the depot's allocation consists of Class 68 locomotives, Mark 5A coaches, Class 165 Networkers, and Class 168 Clubman.
