= Coalville TMD =

Disused railway maintenance depot in Leicestershire, England

- Interactive map of Coalville TMD

Location
- Location: Coalville, Leicestershire
- Coordinates: 52.7289°N 1.3757°W
- OS grid: SK422148

Characteristics
- Owner: British Rail
- Depot code: 15E (1963-1965)
- Type: Diesel

History
- Opened: 1890
- Closed: 1965
- Former depot code: 17C (1948-1958) 15D (1958-1963)

Coalville TMD was a traction maintenance depot located in Coalville, Leicestershire, England. The depot was situated on the Leicester to Burton upon Trent Line and was near the now closed Coalville Town station.
