= Camden Carriage Servicing Depot =

Railway maintenance depot in Greater London, England

- Interactive map of Camden Carriage Servicing Depot

Location
- Location: Camden, Greater London
- Coordinates: 51.5422°N 0.154°W
- OS grid: TQ281842

Characteristics
- Owner: West Midlands Trains
- Depot code: CM (1973 -)
- Type: EMU

Camden Carriage Servicing Depot is a stabling point located in Camden, Greater London, England. The depot is near what used to be Camden Road station, but it closed down in 1916.

The depot code is CM.

== Present ==
As of 2024, there is no allocation. It is, instead, a stabling point for London Northwestern Railway Class 350 Desiros and Class 730 Aventras.
