= Peterborough TMD =

Railway maintenance depot in Peterborough, Cambridgeshire

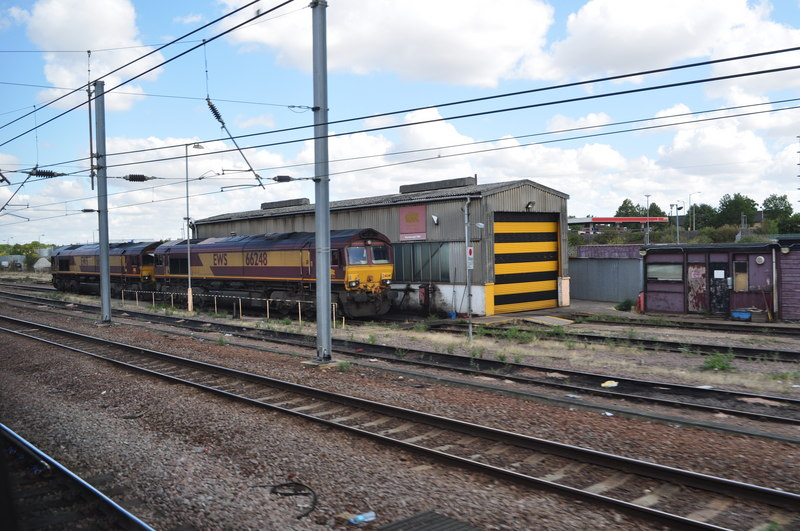
- EWS Class 66s outside the depot in 2010
- Interactive map of Peterborough TMD

Location
- Location: Peterborough, Cambridgeshire
- Coordinates: 52.5787°N 0.2526°W
- OS grid: TL184993

Characteristics
- Owner: DB Cargo UK
- Depot code: PB (1973 -)
- Type: Diesel

Peterborough TMD is a traction maintenance depot located in Peterborough, Cambridgeshire, England. The depot is situated on the East Coast Main Line, to the north of Peterborough station.

The depot code is PB.

== History ==
The depot was opened by British Rail in March 1969.

== Present ==
From 2015, the depot has no allocation. It is, instead, a stabling point for DRS Class 37 locomotives.
