= Stockport Carriage Sidings =

Train stabling point in Greater Manchester, England

- Interactive map of Stockport Carriage Sidings

Location
- Location: Stockport, Greater Manchester, England
- Coordinates: 53.4052°N 2.1641°W
- OS grid: SJ891899

Characteristics
- Owner: Network Rail
- Operator: Northern Trains
- Depot code: SQ
- Type: DMU, EMU

Stockport Carriage Sidings are located in Stockport, Greater Manchester, England. The sidings lie to the west of West Coast Main Line, adjacent to Stockport railway station.

== Rolling stock ==
Stabling is provided for the following multiple unit classes of Northern Trains:

- Class 150 Sprinter diesel multiple units
- Class 156 Super Sprinter diesel multiple units
- Class 195 diesel multiple units
- Class 323 electric multiple units
- Class 331 electric multiple units.
