= British Rail Class 25 =

Diesel-electric railway locomotive used in Great Britain

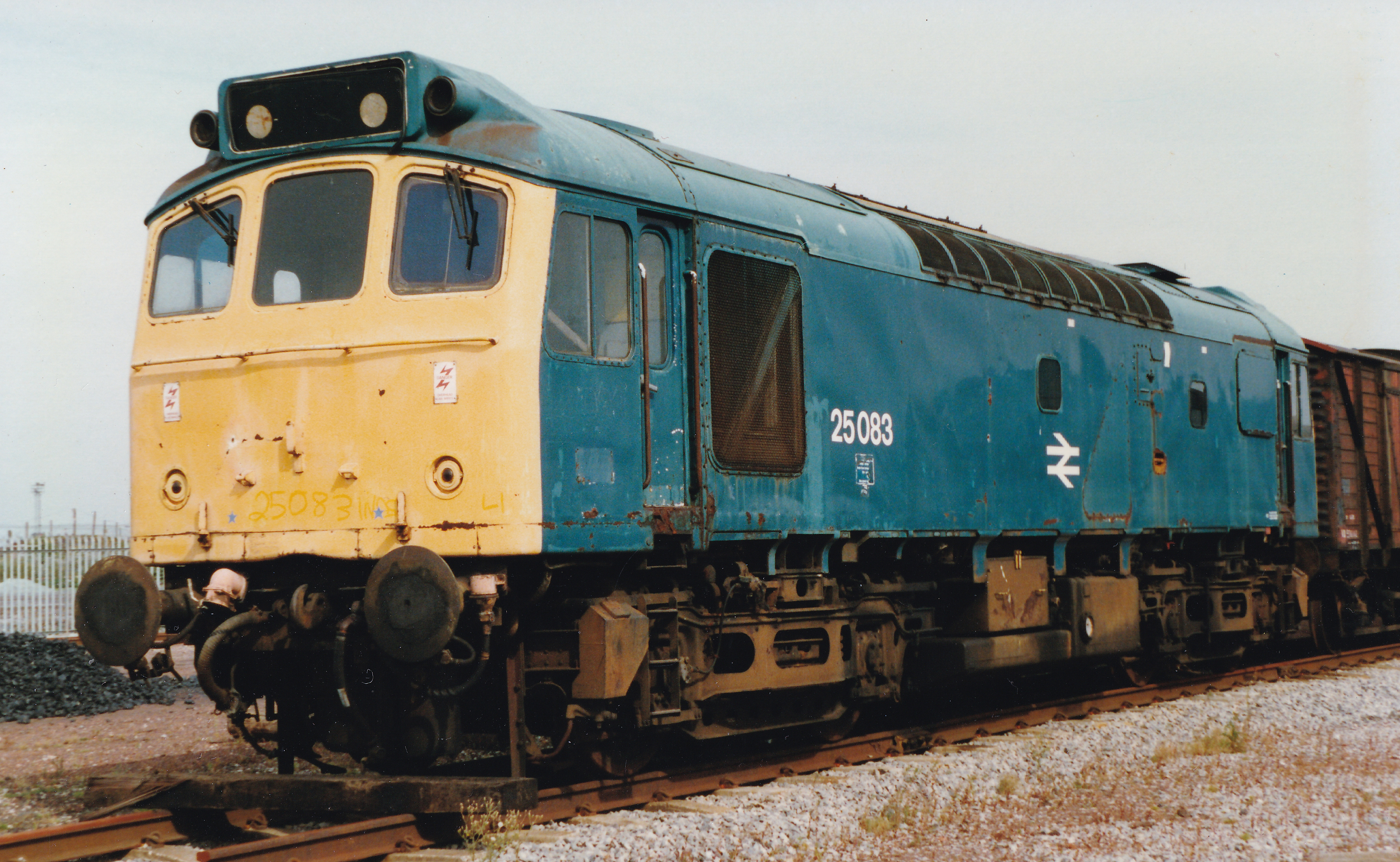
- Class 25/2 in BR blue at Crewe in 1989.
Type and origin
- Power type: Diesel-electric
- Builder: British Railways' Crewe Works, Darlington Works and Derby Works; Beyer, Peacock & Co.
- Build date: 1961–1967
- Total produced: 327
Specifications
- Configuration
  - AAR: B-B
  - UIC: Bo'Bo'
  - Commonwealth: Bo-Bo
- Gauge: 4 ft 8 1/2 in (1,435 mm) standard gauge
- Wheel diameter: 3 ft 9 in (1.143 m)
- Minimum curve: 4.5 chains (91 m)
- Wheelbase: 36 ft 6 in (11.125 m)
- Length: 50 ft 6 in (15.392 m)
- Width: 9 ft 1 in (2.769 m)
- Height: 12 ft 8 in (3.861 m)
- Loco weight: 73 long tons (74.2 t; 81.8 short tons)
- Fuel capacity: 500 imp gal (2,300 L; 600 US gal)
- Prime mover: Sulzer 6LDA28-B
- Generator: BTH generator, type RTB 15656
- Traction motors: D5151–D5175, four BTH traction motors others: four AEI 253 AY traction motors DC
- Transmission: Diesel electric
- MU working: ★ Blue Star
- Train heating: Steam (when present)
- Train brakes: 25001 – 25082: Vacuum 25083 – 25247: Air and Vacuum (Dual Braked)
Performance figures
- Maximum speed: 90 mph (145 km/h)
- Power output: Engine: 1,250 hp (932 kW) @750 rpm
- Tractive effort: Maximum: 39,000 lbf (170 kN) to 45,000 lbf (200 kN)
- Brakeforce: 38 long tons-force (380 kN)
Career
- Operators: British Railways
- Numbers: D5151–D5299, D7500–D7677; later 25001–25327
- Nicknames: Rats
- Axle load class: Route availability 4
- Retired: 1984–1987
- Disposition: 20 preserved, 307 scrapped

The British Rail Class 25, also known as the Sulzer Type 2, is a class of 327 diesel locomotives built between 1961 and 1967 for British Rail. They were numbered in two series, D5151–D5299 and D7500–D7677.

The first 25 locos became known as Class 25/0 and were built at BR Darlington Works. The Class 25/1 locomotives were built at Darlington and BR Derby Works. The Class 25/2 locomotives were built at Derby with some built at Darlington. The final batch of locomotives were designated Class 25/3 and built by Derby Works and Beyer, Peacock and Company of Manchester.

== Background ==
The Class 24 locomotives were the precursor of the Class 25 design but after the delivery of their first few units it became apparent that the speed ceiling of 75 mph (121 km/h) was unduly restrictive and the provision of additional power would be advantageous. In the course of normal development the power output of the Sulzer six-cylinder engine had been increased by 90 hp (67 kW) to give a continuous traction output of 1,250 bhp (930 kW) at 750 rpm by the introduction of charge air cooling and the first locomotives to use this became known as Class 25 locomotives.

The Class 25s were primarily designed for freight work, but a significant number were fitted with boilers for heating passenger trains. Throughout the 1970s they could be found at work across the whole of the British Rail network although the Eastern and Southern Regions never had a long-term allocation. Though regular performers into the early 1980s on Crewe–Cardiff passenger trains, they are best known in that respect for their use on the summer Saturday trains to Aberystwyth, a task they relinquished in 1984. The final Class 25 locomotive was withdrawn from operational service in March 1987 although it continued to be used on enthusiast specials until March 1991.

== Production and classification ==
Distribution of locomotives, March 1974
British Rail Class 25 is located in England
British Rail Class 25 is located in Greater London
Code	Name	Quantity
BR	Bristol Bath Road	6
BS	Bescot	34
CF	Cardiff Canton	12
CW	Cricklewood	14
ED	Eastfield	11
EJ	Ebbw Junction	12
HA	Haymarket	14
KM	Kingmoor	19
LA	Laira	11
LO	Longsight Diesel	30
SP	Springs Branch	49
TI	Tinsley	31
TO	Toton	51
WN	Willesden	31
Withdrawn (1971–72)		2
Total built:		327

=== Class 25/0 ===
Number sequence (original) D5151–D5175, (TOPS) 25 001–25 025

The first 25 locos became known as Class 25/0 and were built at the BR Darlington works using the newer 1,250 hp (930 kW) "B" engine, modified generator assembly and traction motors. This increase in power was obtained from an air/water free flow intercooler fitted between a higher capacity pressure charger and inlet manifold, included within the normal cooling circuit to maintain simplicity. The cylinder head was also modified and strengthened.

The BTH generator, type RTB 15656, was rated as 817.5 kW (1,096.3 hp), 750/545 V, 1090/1500 A at 750 rpm, only slightly different from that used in the earlier Class 24s (Note that all Class 25 locomotives used a generator designated as BTH RTB 15656, but its rating and characteristics changed over time). The generator supplied four BTH 137BX traction motors connected in parallel and rated 245 hp (183 kW), 545 V, 375 A at 560 rpm with a gear ratio of 18:79 (to give a 90 mph (140 km/h) maximum speed). Maximum tractive effort was 39,000 lbf (170 kN) and continuous tractive effort was 20,800 lbf (93,000 N) at 17.1 mph (27.5 km/h), the latter standard for all Class 25s. Power at rail was 949 hp (708 kW), now available between 9.3 and 77.6 mph (124.9 km/h). For the first fifteen locomotives fuel capacity was 520 imp gal (2,400 L; 620 US gal) (design type 25 AV) and the final ten had larger 620-imperial-gallon (2,800 L; 740 US gal) fuel tanks installed (design type 25 BV).

=== Class 25/1 ===
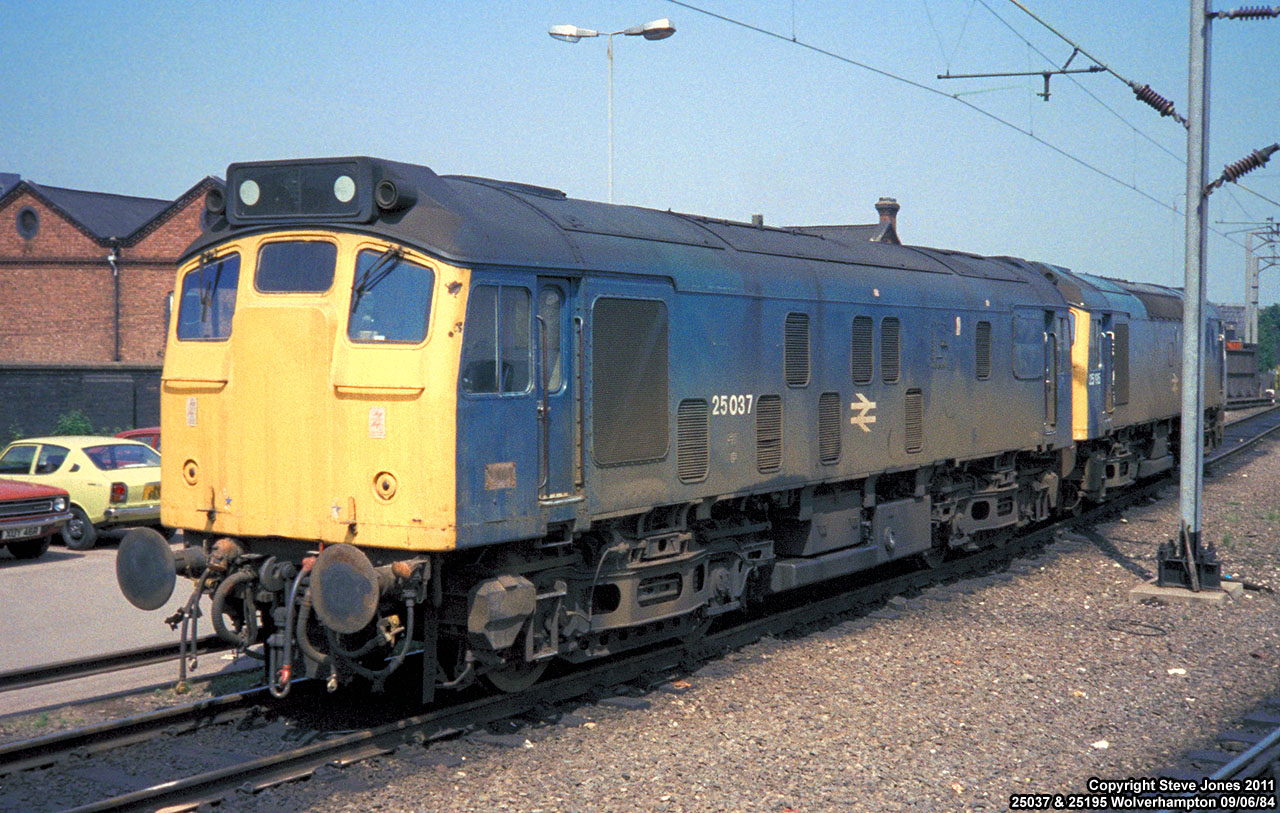
25037 of the 25/1 subclass outside Wolverhampton in 1984

Number sequence (original) D5176–D5232, (TOPS) 25 026–25 082

The Class 25/1 locomotives were built at BR Darlington and Derby locomotive works. They featured the new AEI 253AY traction motor, a result of the collaboration between BTH, MV and American builder Alco. This smaller, lighter motor was an attempt to market a traction motor to a worldwide audience, especially to the 1,000 mm (3 ft 3 3/8 in) metre gauge lines. For Class 25 locomotives these lighter motors meant the discontinuance of other weight saving measures being built into the design. They were highly rated in an attempt to overcome the loss of tractive effort normally found on starting. The field divert system was also modified to allow increased capability throughout all the speed ranges.

The main generator was a 12-pole machine with the rating changed to 819 kW (1,098 hp), 780/545V, 1050/1500A at 750 rpm. (The continuous rating has also been quoted as 819 kW (1,098 hp), 630V, 1300A). The four traction motors were now connected as series parallel pairs being rated at 234 hp (174 kW), 315V, 650A at 460 rpm, with a gear ratio 18:67. Pairs of motors connected in series provided a higher maximum tractive effort (usually quoted as 45,000 lbf (200 kN) although 47,000 lbf (210 kN) could be achieved) but the downside being that a series pair connected machine was more prone to slipping than one with an all parallel grouping. Full power was available between 7 and 77.5 mph (124.7 km/h), an improvement over Class 25/0 locomotives with all other ratings unchanged from the earlier series. The traction motor's continuous rating of 650 amps was not far removed from its one-hour short term or 'emergency' rating of 680 amps, and this could only be monitored manually. On heavy trains close monitoring of the ammeters was necessary to avoid motor damage. Though the body shell remained similar to D5151 there were a number of refinements. The air horns were relocated to either side of the headcode panel. The cab skirt and body fairing were discontinued, though the support lugs remained. A new driving control panel was fitted. The fuel and water tanks were also redesigned with a fuel capacity of 510 imp gal (2,300 L; 610 US gal) (also quoted in sources as being 500 or 560 imp gal (2,300 or 2,500 L; 600 or 670 US gal)).

There were initially two variants of this sub-class. The vast majority were boilered and designated 251 AV. The four without train heating were designated 251 BV. In due course, when it was decided to fit dual braking to a number of locomotives, those previously 251 AV became 251 CX and one of the 251 BV (25032) became 251 DX.

=== Class 25/2 ===
Number sequence (original) D5233–D5299, D7500–D7597 (TOPS) 25 083–25 247

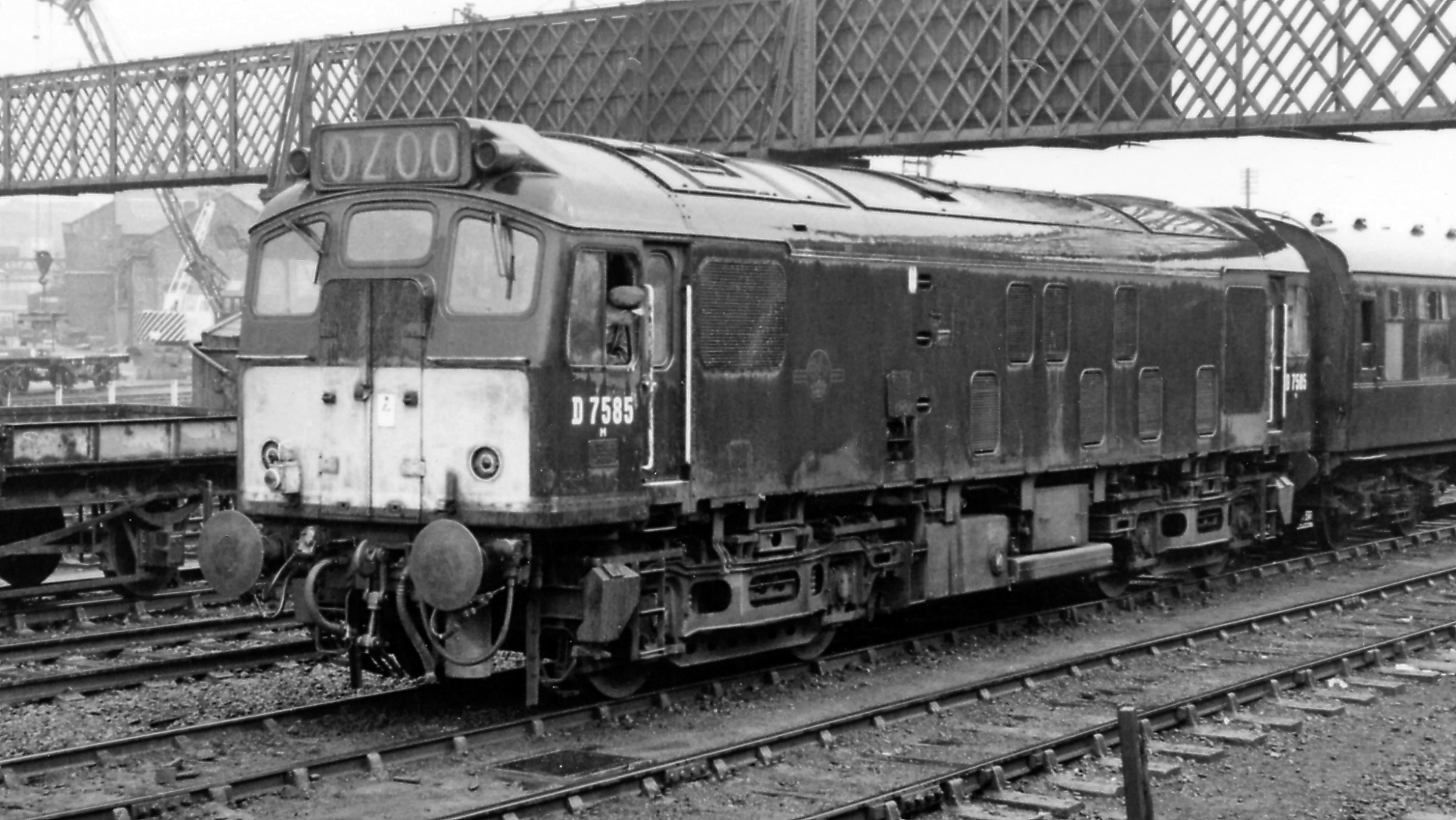
D7585 working as Derby station pilot in May 1965. The livery is BR green with small yellow warning panels.

The Class 25/2 locomotives featured restyled bodywork and two-tone green livery similar to that carried by the Brush Type 4 (Class 47). The majority were built at BR Derby. The redesign principally affected two areas, the cab and the location of the air intakes. The gangway doors fitted to the earlier examples were rarely used, their presence adding to the complaints of noise and draughts in the cabs and the removal of these allowed the centre windscreen to be enlarged, so that its lower edge lined up with the windscreens on either side giving a noticeably different front end look. The removal of the air filters from the side air louvers to the cantrail was the result of a comparison carried out at Inverness between a batch of Derby built Type 2s and a batch of BRCW Type 2s (Class 26 and Class 27), the tests targeting the air quality within the engine room. These tests revealed the location of the grilles on the Derby build allowed for much more debris to reach the filters (especially the lower ones), clogging them quicker, leading to poorer air quality within the engine compartment, and so potentially affecting performance and engine wear. With such a large order to be completed it was felt that a redesign of these areas would have cost savings in the long run, in addition to a better working environment within the cabs, and with a general less cluttered look about the locomotive's exterior.

Some class 25/2s were built at Darlington works, including D7597 (later 25247) which was the last locomotive to be built at Darlington. The 25/2s built at Darlington had the original bodywork, not the restyled design.

There were six variants of this sub-class, reflecting that locos were boilered and/or vacuum braked and/or dual braked. Boiler fitted locomotives included the first five (252 AV) and final thirty Class 25/2 (252 DV). Only members of the latter batch were modified for dual brake operation becoming 252 CX with the exception of 25242 that had had its boiler removed and was designated 252 FX. The non-boilered vacuum braked locos were 252 BV and when dual braked became 252 EX.

=== Class 25/3 ===
Number sequence (original) D7598–D7677 (TOPS) 25 248–25 327

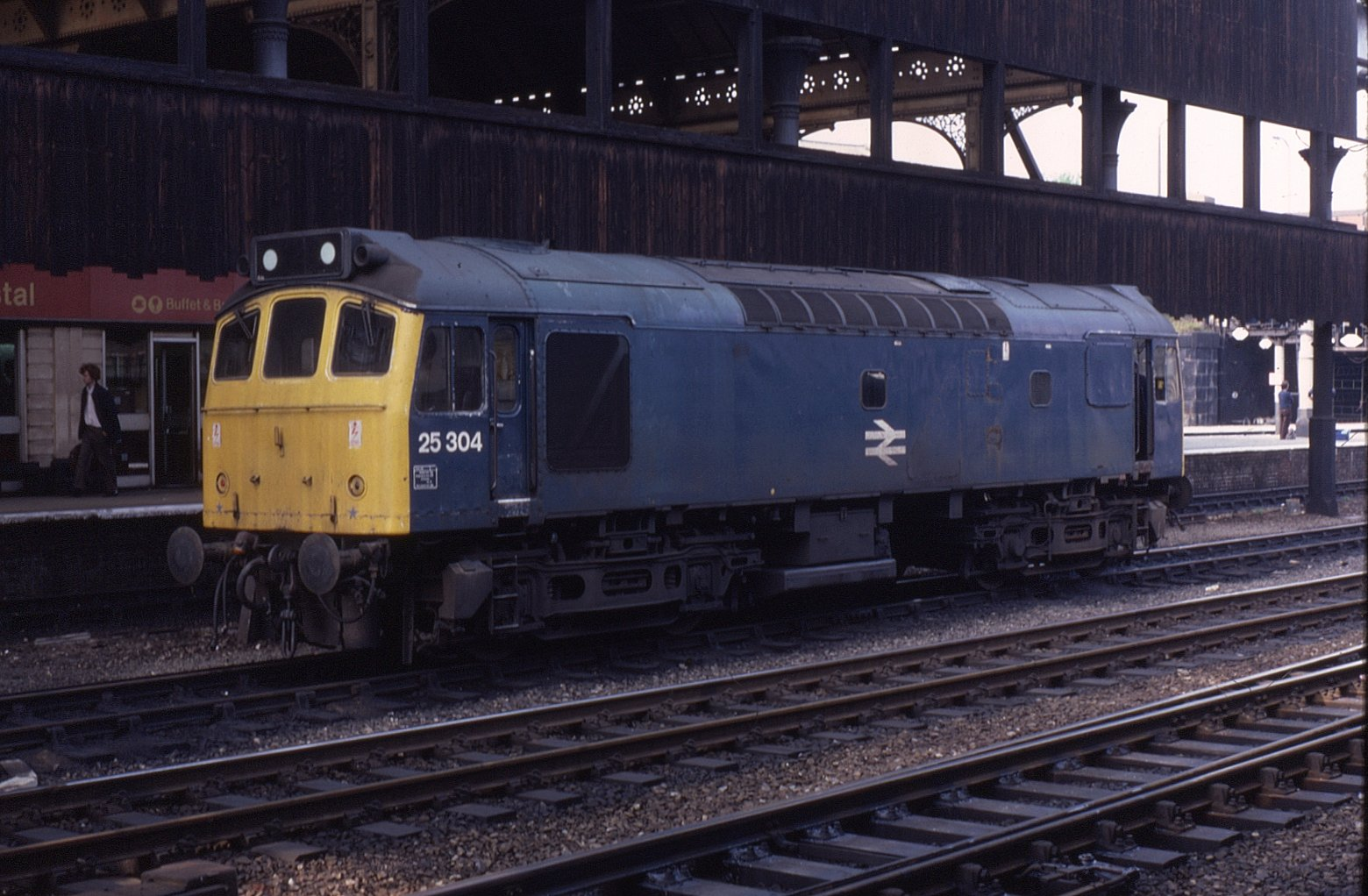
25304 of the 25/3 subclass at Manchester Victoria in 1982.

The final batch of locomotives were designated Class 25/3 and was to be built by BR's Derby Works and Beyer, Peacock and Company of Manchester. However, because of financial problems Beyer, Peacock was unable to complete the final 18 locomotives and these were transferred to BR Derby for construction.

Though these locomotives still carried a RTB 15656 generator, this variant was a ten pole machine with a modified assembly incompatible with earlier equipment. The regulated (full hp) part of its characteristic was substantially the same as before but the unloading point, that is the point at which full power could no longer be utilised, was altered to 900 A, 910 V (819 kW) from 1,050 A, 780 V (819 kW). Only two stages of field weakening were employed, previous machines had six, and this provided ‘full power' at speeds between 7 and 80 mph (130 km/h), and maximum tractive effort was reduced to 41,500 lbf (185,000 N).

The latter half of the 1960s had seen the widespread introduction of solid state electronics and these locomotives incorporated a control system where speed was detected electronically rather than mechanically. A signal from a tachogenerator was used to close contactors in sequence at given speeds to activate the motor's field weakening process, rather than through contacts and relays as in earlier types. The control system ensured the traction motors and main generator were all operated within the continuous rating of the machines except in full field conditions when the driver was able to judge how long to remain in the short-term rating condition. There were two variants of the Class 25/3 sub-class. Early 25/3 AV locomotives were fitted with vacuum brakes and in due course many of these were dual braked and redesignated 25/3 BX. By the time the last few locomotives were under construction dual braking had become the norm and ten of the last batch from Derby were built new as 25/3 BX locomotives for work out of Willesden on the recently upgraded West Coast Main Line.

=== Class 25/9 ===
At the end of 1985 twelve of the remaining Class 25/3 locomotives were designated as 25/9, the intention being that they would operate on traffic won for the Industrial Minerals Division of Railfreight that included salt for road gritting from the ICI mine at Winsford. The locos were selected from the available pool of Class 25 locomotives in March 1985 with the expectation of three more years of service before 10,000 running hours since last Works attention would be reached and their maintenance would be concentrated at Carlisle Kingmoor TMD. At that point the expected cascade of motive power on BR as a whole would see them replaced by Class 31 locomotives. However, the traffic they were designated for was not captured and in due course the sub-class were withdrawn along with the other members.

=== Train Heating Units ===
Three Class 25/3 locomotives were converted in 1983 at Aberdeen Ferryhill Depot for use as mobile generators to provide electric heating on trains where the hauling locomotive could not supply this. As part of the modifications the traction motors were removed and ETH sockets fitted. The engine was set to run at 640 rpm when providing heat, compared with the idle speed of 325 rpm, and the full engine speed on a non-modified Class 25 of 750 rpm.

They were given departmental numbers 97250 / 97251 / 97252 (formerly 25310 / 25305 / 25314). They were referred to as ETHEL units (Electric Train Heating Ex-Locomotives), and unofficially named Ethel 1, Ethel 2 and Ethel 3. They were painted in a blue/grey livery in an effort to match the coaching stock livery of the day. After use in Scotland, two of the units (Ethel 2 and Ethel 3) moved to London for heating stock hauled by main line steam locomotives, and two were painted in the then current InterCity Executive livery (nicknamed 'raspberry ripple') to match BR's Special Trains Unit's Mk1 coaches. Ethel 1 was withdrawn in 1987, the other two in 1990. All three were scrapped in 1994.

=== Prototype ===
In 1962 Sulzer designed and began development of a prototype diesel engine for higher outputs based on the LDA range. Rated initially at 1,700 hp (1,300 kW) at 850 rpm (with a development potential to 2,000 bhp (1,500 kW) at 850 rpm) it was approximately the same overall size as the 6LDA28 and designated LDA28-R. BR was approached with the idea that one of the Derby Type 2s should be fitted with this engine but development work proceeded slowly and problems with the 12LDA28-C (used on the Class 47 locomotive) diverted resources. In the end development was terminated and the locomotive set aside for its use, D5299, was completed as a standard Class 25/2.

== Operation ==
The Class 25 locomotives were initially delivered to London Midland and Scottish regions while the Western Region had Class 22s to operate in the type 2 power classification. With the withdrawal of all diesel-hydraulic locomotives planned, there was a perceived gap in this power range, and locomotive 7657 worked trial trips between Exeter and Barnstaple in August 1971 resulting in the WR Chief Civil Engineer approving the use of the class as a direct replacement in the West of England.

The last operational Class 25 was 25322 which was withdrawn on 23 March 1987. It was then restored by apprentices at Leeds Holbeck shed including repainting in BR two-tone green and having its original number of D7672 applied. In this form it worked railtours over the Settle–Carlisle line between 1989 and 1991.

== Preservation ==
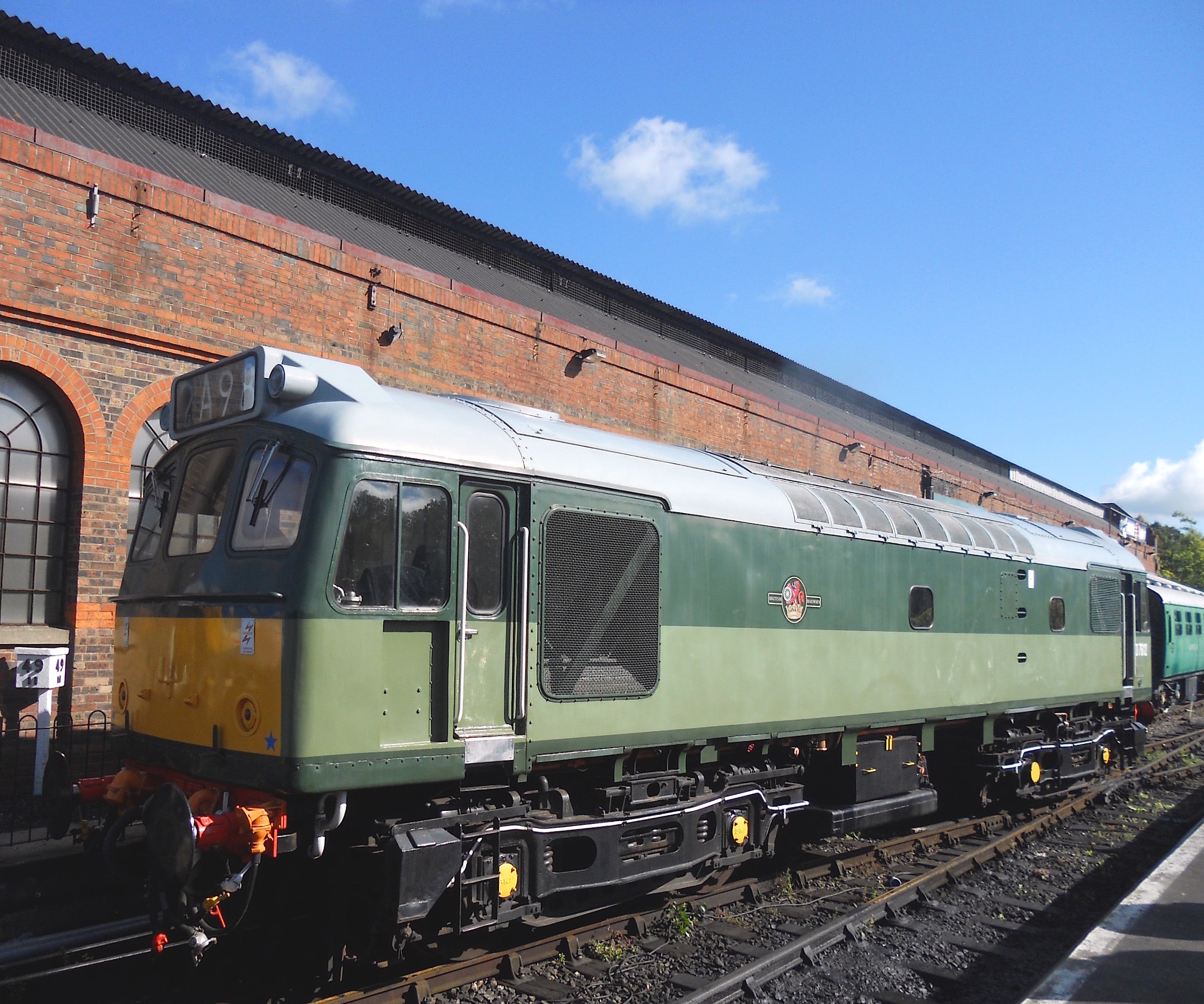
D7612 at Tunbridge Wells West on the Spa Valley Railway

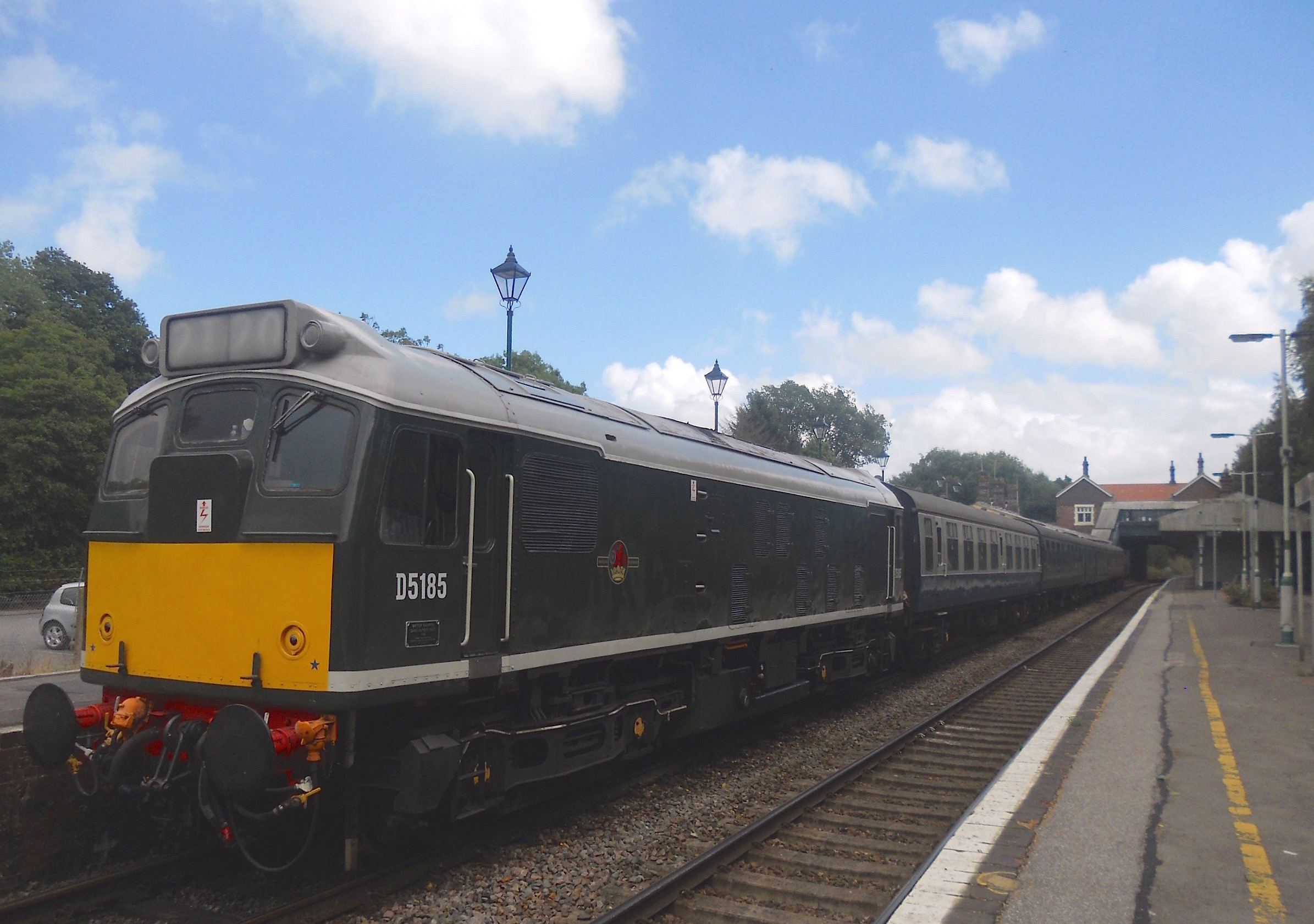
D5185 at Eridge on the Spa Valley Railway

Twenty Class 25s have survived in preservation, of all sub-types except Class 25/0. Twelve members of this class were rescued from Vic Berry's Scrapyard during the late 1980s. They include D5185 aka 25035 Castell Dinas Brân, D5207 aka 25057, D5209 aka 25059, D5222 aka 25072, D7523 aka 25173 John F Kennedy, D7541 aka 25191, D7594 aka 25244, D7615 aka 25265 Harlech Castle, D7628 aka 25278 Sybilla, D7659 aka 25309, D7629 aka 25279, D7663 aka 25313 and D7633 aka 25904(25283). D7612 was sent to MC Metals before entering preservation.

Numbers carried (Current in bold)		Name	Image	Location	Current Status	Livery
**D5185**	25035	Castell Dinas Brân		Great Central Railway	Operational	BR Green (Yellow Warning Panels)
D5207	**25057**	–		Worksop	Stored	BR Blue
D5209	**25059**	–		Keighley and Worth Valley Railway	Stored Awaiting Repairs	BR Blue
**D5217**	25067	–		Nemesis Rail	Undergoing restoration	BR Green (Yellow Warning Panels)
D5222	25072	–		Caledonian Railway	Stored	BR Green (Full Yellow Ends)
D5233	**25083**	–		Caledonian Railway	Stored	BR Blue
**D7523**	25173	John F Kennedy		Battlefield Line Railway	Undergoing Repairs	BR Two-Tone Green (Yellow Warning Panels)
D7535	**25185**			South Devon Railway	Operational	BR Blue (Full Yellow Ends)
D7541	**25191**			South Devon Railway	Undergoing Overhaul	BR Green (Yellow Warning Panels)
D7585	**25235**	–		Bo'ness and Kinneil Railway	Undergoing Overhaul	BR Blue
D7594	25244	–		Kent and East Sussex Railway	Stored	N/A
**D7612**	25262	–		South Devon Railway	Operational	BR Two-Tone Green (Yellow Warning Panels)
D7615	**25265**	Harlech Castle		Burton-On-Trent, Nemesis Depot	Stored	BR Blue
**D7628**	25278	Sybilla		North Yorkshire Moors Railway	Operational	BR Two-Tone Green (Yellow Warning Panels)
D7629	**25279**	–		East Lancashire Railway	Operational	BR Blue
**D7633**	25283	–		Stoke-on-Trent	Stored	BR Two-Tone Green (Yellow Warning Panels)
**D7659**	25309	–		Peak Rail	Operational	BR Two-Tone Green (Yellow Warning Panels)
D7663	**25313**	–		Worksop	Stored	BR Blue
D7671	**25321**	–		Midland Railway - Butterley	Stored	BR Green
D7672	**25322**	Tamworth Castle		Churnet Valley Railway	Awaiting Restoration	BR Blue Variant

The class returned to the main line in October 2007 when D7628 (25278) worked from the North Yorkshire Moors Railway to and from Whitby station.

== Liveries ==
Name	Image	Notes
BR Green		All class 25/0s as delivered
BR Green (Small Warning Panels)		All 25/1s as delivered plus 25/2s built at Darlington Works
BR Two-Tone Green (Small Warning Panels)		The lower body panel painted in a shade referred to as "Sherwood Green". Applied to Class 25/2s built at Derby Works and by Beyer Peacock, and all 25/3s up to D7659 as delivered.
BR Green (Full Warning Panels)		No record
BR Two-Tone Green (Full Warning Panels)		A small number of locomotives were repainted in this livery between 1971 and 1973 with at least 3 locos recorded.
BR Blue (Small Warning Panels)		Two Class 25/3 locomotives were delivered in this livery by Derby Works in 1967. In addition a further 3 Class 25/1s were outshopped with small yellow warning panels
BR Blue		The final 16 locomotives were delivered in this livery and the last locos were repainted into Rail Blue in 1976
BR Blue ‘Ice Cream Van'		Only ever carried on Class 25 25322 'Tamworth Castle'
BR blue and grey 'ETHEL'		Carried on ADB97250-2 (previously 25310, 25305, 25314). Carried namplates "ETHEL 1", "ETHEL 2" and "ETHEL 3"
Intercity 'ETHEL'		97250-2 with the ADB prefix removed from the number and repainted. Nameplates removed and the ETHEL names applied in the same manner as the locomotive number, but at the opposite end.

== Nicknames ==
Railfans nicknamed the class Rats, as it was alleged they could be seen everywhere in Britain, and hence were "as common as rats". They were also known, mostly by their drivers, as Spluts, owing to their habit of spluttering when they broke down, which they often did.

== Model railways ==
In 1977 Hornby Railways launched its first version of the BR Class 25 in OO gauge. This was followed by Bachmann (OO), Heljan (O and OO) and Sutton's Locomotive Workshops (OO, EM, P4)
