= British Rail Class 08 =

Diesel–electric shunting locomotives

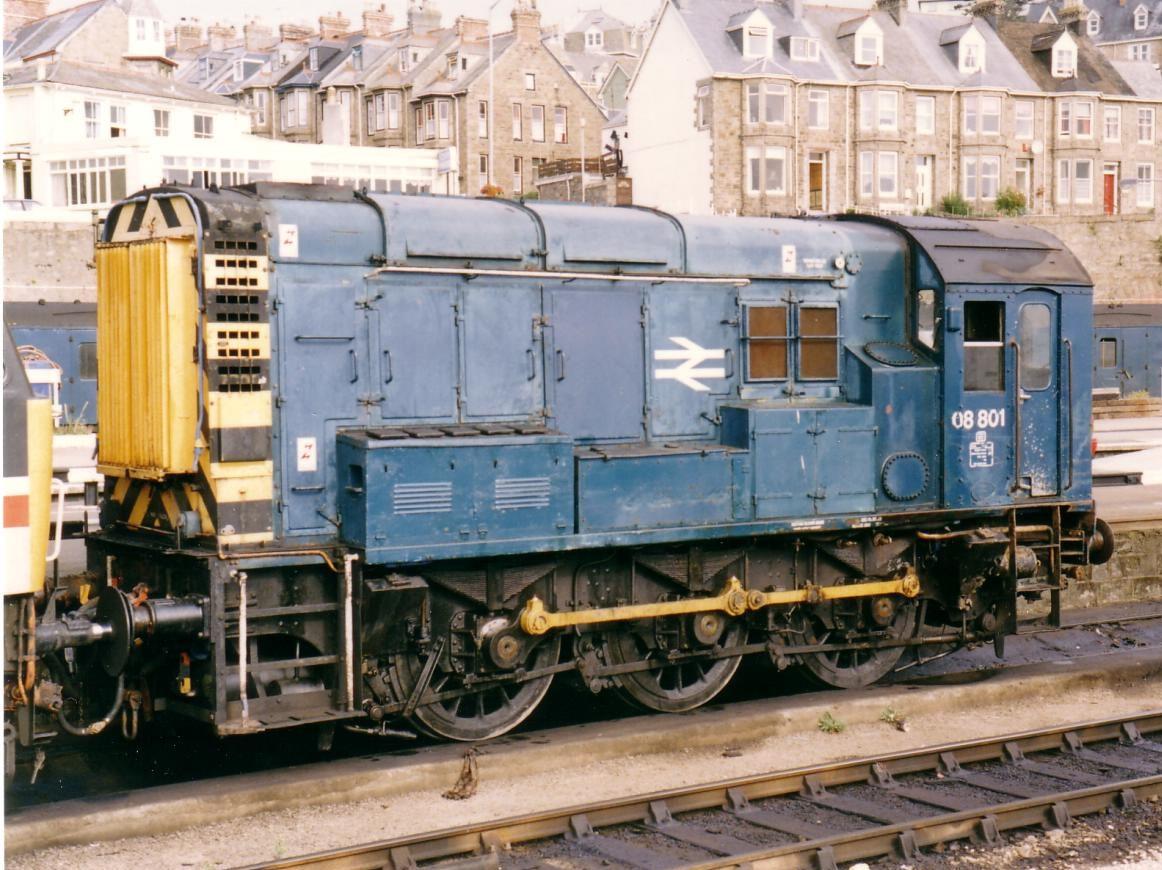
- 08801 at Penzance station in 1990
Type and origin
- Power type: Diesel–electric
- Builder: British Railways: Crewe Works; Darlington Works; Derby Works; Doncaster Works; Horwich Works
- Build date: 1952–1962
- Total produced: 996
Specifications
- Configuration
  - Whyte: 0-6-0DE
  - UIC: C
- Wheel diameter: 4 ft 6 in (1.372 m)
- Wheelbase: 11 ft 6 in (3.505 m)
- Length: 29 ft 3 in (8.92 m)
- Width: 8 ft 6 in (2.591 m)
- Height: 12 ft 8 5/8 in (3.877 m); 11 ft 9 5/8 in (3.597 m) (08/9)
- Loco weight: 49 long tons (49.8 t; 54.9 short tons) to 51 long tons (51.8 t; 57.1 short tons)
- Fuel capacity: 668 imp gal (3,040 L; 802 US gal)
- Prime mover: English Electric 6KT
- RPM range: 300–680 rpm (D3503–D4192)
- Engine type: Four-stroke inline-six diesel
- Aspiration: Naturally aspirated
- Displacement: 5,655 cu in (92.67 L)
- Generator: DC
- Traction motors: DC English Electric 506, 2 off
- Cylinders: 6
- Cylinder size: 10 in (254 mm) × 12 in (305 mm) (bore × stroke)
- Transmission: Diesel–electric transmission, double reduction gearing
- MU working: Not originally fitted, some retrofitted with type ★ Blue Star
- Train heating: None
- Train brakes: Vacuum, later Air & Vacuum or Air only
Performance figures
- Maximum speed: 15 mph (24 km/h) or 20 mph (32 km/h)
- Power output: Engine: 350 or 400 hp (261 or 298 kW)
- Tractive effort: Maximum: 35,000 lbf (160 kN)
- Brakeforce: 19 long tons-force (190 kN)
Career
- Operators: British Railways; InterCity; Network SouthEast; Rail Express Systems; Freightliner; Eurostar; DB Cargo UK; GNER; National Express East Coast; East Coast; Virgin Trains East Coast; LNER; Midland Mainline; East Midlands Trains; East Midlands Railway; Arriva Rail North; Northern Trains; Harry Needle Railroad Company; Foster Yeoman; Mendip Rail
- Numbers: 13000–13116, 13127–13136, 13167–13365; later: D3000–D3116, D3127–D3136, D3167-D3365 (renumbered from above), D3366–D3438, D3454–D3472, D3503–D3611, D3652–D3664, D3672–D3718, D3722–D4048, D4095–D4098, D4115–D4192; later 08 001–08 958
- Axle load class: Route availability 5 or 6 (see text)
- Withdrawn: 1967 (1), 1972–present
- Disposition: 82 preserved, 10 converted to Class 09s, 6 converted to Class 13s, 5 exported to Liberia, 100 in service, remainder scrapped

The British Rail Class 08 is a class of diesel–electric shunting locomotives built by British Railways (BR). As the standard BR general-purpose diesel shunter, the class became a familiar sight at major stations and freight yards. Since their introduction in 1952, however, the nature of rail traffic in Britain has changed considerably. Freight trains are now mostly fixed rakes of wagons, and passenger trains are mostly multiple units or have driving van trailers, neither requiring the attention of a shunting locomotive. Consequently, a large proportion of the class has been withdrawn from mainline use and stored, scrapped, exported or sold to industrial or heritage railways.

As of 2020, around 100 locomotives remained working on industrial sidings and on the main British railway network. On heritage railways, they have become particularly common, appearing on many of the preserved standard-gauge lines in Britain, with over 80 preserved, including the first one built.

== History ==
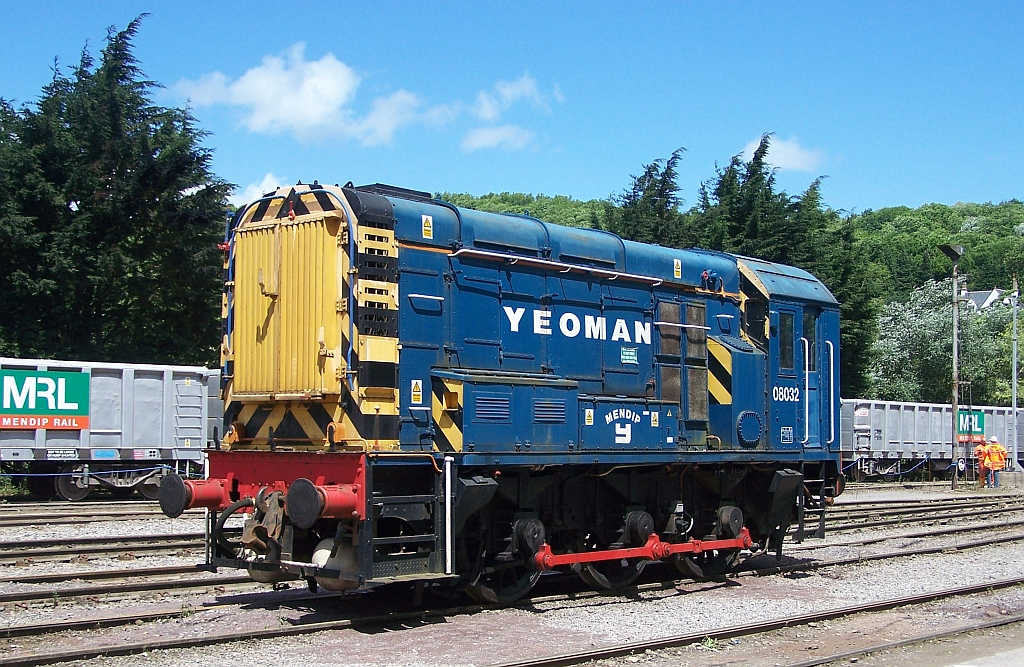
08 032 at Foster Yeoman's Torr Works, 2008

The Class 08 design was based on the LMS 12033 series (later TOPS Class 11) design. There were also 26 of the near-identical but higher-geared Class 09, and 171 similar locomotives fitted with different engines and transmissions (some of which became Class 10), which together brought the total number of outwardly-similar machines to 1,193.

The pioneer locomotive, number 13000, was built in 1952 although it did not enter service until 1953. Production continued until 1962 with 996 locomotives produced, making it the most numerous of any British shunting locomotive class, and indeed, the most numerous of any British locomotive class overall. (Note: Since the most numerous British main-line (non-shunting) class, the Class 47, numbers 512 examples.)

The locomotives were built at the BR's Crewe, Darlington, Derby, Doncaster and Horwich works.

In 1985, three locomotives were reduced in height for use on the Burry Port and Gwendraeth Valley Railway in southwest Wales, and became Class 08/9. The remainder of the class were reclassified as sub-class 08/0. A further two were converted to 08/9s in 1987.

The first locomotive to be withdrawn was D3193 in 1967. 31 other 08s were withdrawn before TOPS renumbering in 1973, with a further 12 having a TOPS number allotted but withdrawn before it could applied. Withdrawals continued in subsequent decades until by the beginning of the 1990s most of the class had been withdrawn. As part of the privatisation of British Rail in the mid-1990s most of the survivors passed to EWS with some going to passenger operators for use as depot shunters. At the same time as the withdrawals, many were purchased by heritage railways.

In mid-2008, EWS had over 40 class 08s in operation, with a greater number stored. Freightliner also had about five in operation, as did the locomotive company Wabtec. FirstGroup operated fewer than five; additionally, some work at industrial sidings – two for Foster Yeoman, one for Mendip Rail, one for Corus, one at ICI Wilton, two for English China Clays, amongst others. A few other businesses in the rail industry operated single examples.

=== Exported locomotives ===
Sixteen English Electric 0-6-0DE 350 hp locomotives, based on the Class 11/Class 08 design but modified for 1,600 mm (5 ft 3 in) gauge, were built new and exported 1951–53 to Australia, entering service on the Victorian Railways as the F class.

Five Class 08s were exported to Liberia, numbers 3047, 3092, 3094, 3098 and 3100. All five locos remain in Liberia and have been considerably robbed of parts in the intervening years.

In 2007, 08 738 and 08 939 were equipped for multiple operation at Toton TMD and repainted in Euro Cargo Rail livery before being sent to France in April 2009.

== Operations ==
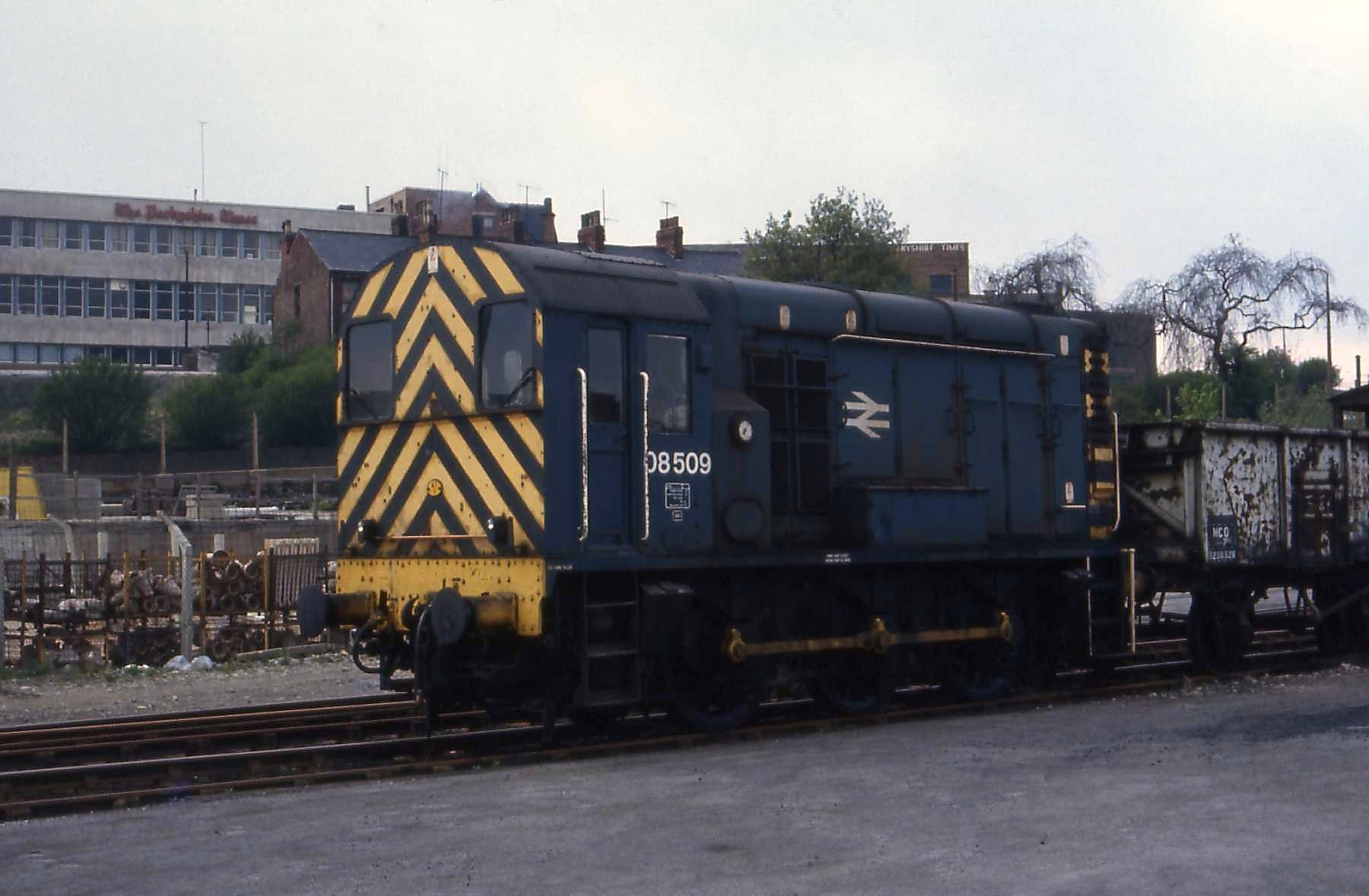
08 509 in Rail Blue livery at Chesterfield Goods Yard

As the standard general-purpose diesel shunter on the British rail network, almost any duty requiring shunting would involve a Class 08. The class was a familiar sight at many major stations, yards and industrial sidings where they would assemble trains and assist in many other duties such as hauling work trains.

== Technical description ==
The Class 08 design was based on the LMS 12033 series (later TOPS Class 11) design.

The engine is an English Electric (EE) 6 cylinder, 4-stroke, 6KT. Traction motors are two EE 506 motors with double reduction gear drive. The main generator is an EE 801.

In 1955, locomotives D3117 to D3122 entered traffic fitted with Crossley 6-cyl ESNT6 engines and two Crompton Parkinson traction motors. The same year, D3137 to D3151 entered service with Blackstone 6-cyl ER6T engines and GEC traction motors, as did D3439 to D3543, D3473 to D3502, DD3612 to D3651 and D4049 to D4094. Another batch, D3152 to D3166 had Blackstone engines but BTH traction motors.

== Design variations ==
There were variations on the basic design, which were given the following TOPS design codes:

TOPS design code	Electrical system	Max speed	Weight	Brakes	Route availability	Notes
08-0AV	90 V	20 mph (32 km/h)	49.8 long tons (50.6 t; 55.8 short tons)	Vacuum	5	
08-0BX	110 V	20 mph (32 km/h)	50.4 long tons (51.2 t; 56.4 short tons)	Dual	5	
08-0CA	90 V	20 mph (32 km/h)	49.6 long tons (50.4 t; 55.6 short tons)	Air	5	
08-0DV	90 V	15 mph (24 km/h)	49.8 long tons (50.6 t; 55.8 short tons)	Vacuum	5	
08-0BX	90 V	15 mph (24 km/h)	50.4 long tons (51.2 t; 56.4 short tons)	Dual	5	
08-0FA	90 V	15 mph (24 km/h)	49.6 long tons (50.4 t; 55.6 short tons)	Air	5	
08-0KX	110 V	15 mph (24 km/h)	50.4 long tons (51.2 t; 56.4 short tons)	Dual	5	
08-0LX	110 V	15 mph (24 km/h)	50.4 long tons (51.2 t; 56.4 short tons)	Dual	5	Scharfenberg coupler Adapter fitted
08-0MA	110 V	15 mph (24 km/h)	49.8 long tons (50.6 t; 55.8 short tons)	Air	5	
08-0NA	90 V	15 mph (24 km/h)	49.8 long tons (50.6 t; 55.8 short tons)	Air	5	Fitted with Buckeye couplings
08-0PA	90 V	15 mph (24 km/h)	51.0 long tons (51.8 t; 57.1 short tons)	Air	6	Fitted with Buckeye couplings
08-0QA	90 V	15 mph (24 km/h)	51.0 long tons (51.8 t; 57.1 short tons)	Air	6	Fitted with Buckeye couplings
08-0RA	110 V	15 mph (24 km/h)	51.0 long tons (51.8 t; 57.1 short tons)	Air	6	Fitted with Buckeye couplings
08-0SA	110 V	15 mph (24 km/h)	49.0 long tons (49.8 t; 54.9 short tons)	Air	6	

=== Class 08/9 ===
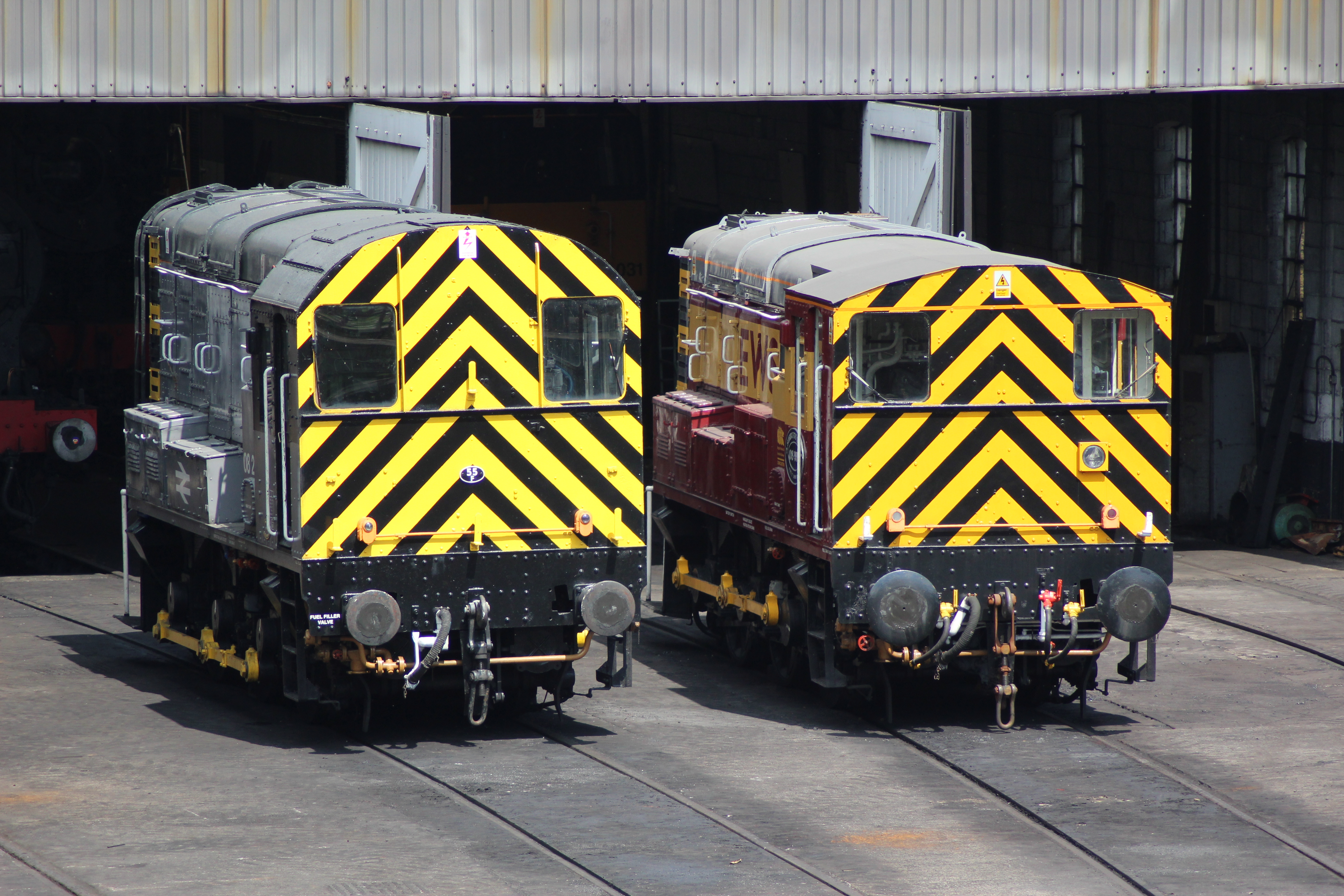
08 266 (left) alongside cut-down 08 993 (right) at the Keighley & Worth Valley Railway in 2017, showing the lower height of the 08/9 subclass.

Class 08/9 locomotives were modified from the standard class by having headlights and lowered bodywork, with the overall height reduced to 11 ft 10 in (3.61 m), for use on the Burry Port and Gwendraeth Valley Railway up to Cwmmawr. In 2007, three were used on infrastructure trains on the Manchester Metrolink.

TOPS design code	Electrical system	Max speed	Weight	Brakes	Notes
08-9AV	90 V	15 mph (24 km/h)	49.8 long tons (50.6 t; 55.8 short tons)	Vacuum	08 991 converted from 08 203; 08 992 converted from 08 259
08-9CX	90 V	15 mph (24 km/h)	50.4 long tons (51.2 t; 56.4 short tons)	Dual	08 993 converted from 08 592
08-9DA	90 V	15 mph (24 km/h)	49.6 long tons (50.4 t; 55.6 short tons)	Air	08 994 converted from 08 462; 08 995 converted from 08 687

=== BR Class 13 ===
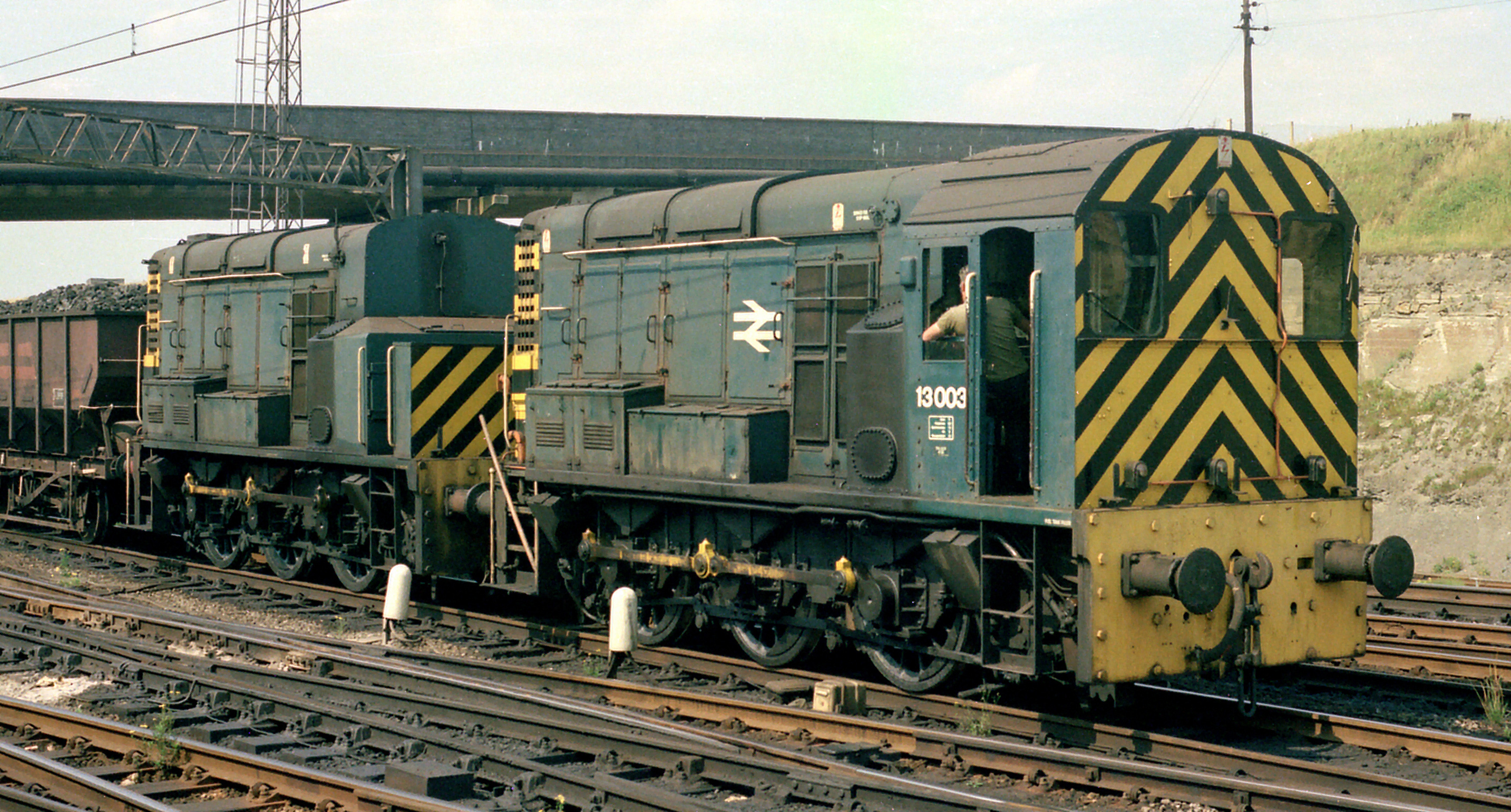
Class 13 no. 13003, Tinsley Marshalling Yard, 1974

Six Class 08 units were adapted for a specialist role at Tinsley Marshalling Yard, where there was a requirement for more powerful shunters. These locomotives were permanently coupled together in pairs as a 'master and slave' (the slave unit with its cab removed) and reclassified as Class 13. All were withdrawn by 1985.

=== Class 08e ===
The Class 08e is a conversion of the Class 08 to battery power by company Positive Traction. The first in regular service was sold to Heidelberg Materials for their Whatley quarry.

== Fleet ==
A full list of Class 08s operating on the National Rail network
Numbers	Owners	Location	Comments
08220	English Electric Preservation	Nottingham Transport Heritage Centre, Ruddington	
08308, 08523, 08573, 08613, 08885, 08936	RMS Locotec	Weardale Railway, Wolsingham, County Durham	08308 carries the number "23". In 2023 it became a battery powered prototype for Positive Traction of Chesterfield.; 08613 carries the symbol "H064"; 08885 carries the symbol "H042" and the number "18"
08375	RMS Locotec	Port of Boston, Lincolnshire	
08423, 08788, 08847, 08874	RMS Locotec	PD Ports, Grangetown, Middlesbrough	08423 carries the name LOCO 2 and the number "14"; 08847 carries the name LOCO 1
08588, 08700	RMS Locotec	Ilford Depot, London	08588 carries the symbol "H047"
08622, 08809	RMS Locotec	Ketton Cement Works, Rutland	08622 carries the symbol "H028" and the number "19"; 08809 carries the number "24"
08648	RMS Locotec	Inverness Depot, Highlands	
08754	RMS Locotec	Wolverton Works, Milton Keynes, Buckinghamshire	Carries the symbol "H054"
08756, 08871	RMS Locotec	Derby RTC, Derbyshire	08871 carries the symbol "H074"
08762	RMS Locotec	Attero Recycling, Rossington, Doncaster, South Yorkshire	Carries the symbol "H067"
08331	Class 20	Midland Railway, Butterley	
08389, 08877, 08924	Harry Needle Railroad Company	Tremorfa Steelworks, Cardiff	08924 carries the name CELSA 2
08417, 08428, 08742, 08765, 08782, 08786, 08798, 08799, 08824, 08943	Harry Needle Railroad Company	Barrow Hill Roundhouse, Chesterfield, Derbyshire	08824 carries the name IEMD 01
08500, 08578, 08602, 08802, 08818, 08892, 08904	Harry Needle Railroad Company	Worksop Depot, Nottinghamshire	08602 carries the number "004"; 08818 carries the name Molly and the number "4"
08502, 08676, 08685, 08804	Harry Needle Railroad Company	East Kent Railway, Shepherdswell	
08527, 08630, 08711, 08918, 08994	Harry Needle Railroad Company	Nemesis Rail, Burton-on-Trent, Staffordshire	08630 carries the name CELSA 3
08623, 08682, 08714, 08879, 08905	Harry Needle Railroad Company	Hope Cement Works, Derbyshire	08682 carries the name Lionheart
08653, 08701, 08706	Harry Needle Railroad Company	Battlefield Line Railway, Leicestershire	
08834	Harry Needle Railroad Company	Allerton Depot, Liverpool	
08865	Harry Needle Railroad Company	Central Rivers Depot, Barton-under-Needwood, Staffordshire	Carries the name GILLY
08868	Harry Needle Railroad Company	Arriva Train Care, Crewe, Cheshire	
08872	Harry Needle Railroad Company	European Metal Recycling, Attercliffe, South Yorkshire	
08401, 08571	Ed Murray & Sons	Hunslet Engine Company, Barton-under-Needwood, Staffordshire	
08445	Ed Murray & Sons	Daventry International Railfreight Terminal, Northamptonshire	
08472, 08596	Ed Murray & Sons	Craigentinny Depot, Edinburgh	
08615, 08823	Ed Murray & Sons	Shotton Works, Deesside	08615 carries the name UNCLE DAI; 08823 carries the name KEVLA
08643	Ed Murray & Sons	Merehead Rail Terminal, Somerset	
08669, 08724, 08853	Ed Murray & Sons	Doncaster Works, South Yorkshire	
08405	Railway Support Services	Neville Hill Depot, Leeds	
08411, 08460, 08536, 08568, 08593, 08632, 08652, 08663, 08709, 08730, 08752, 08921, 08927	Railway Support Services	Rye Farm, Wishaw, Sutton Coldfield, West Midlands	08460 carries the name SPIRIT OF THE OAK; 08568 carries the name St. Rollox; 08927 carries the number "D4157"
08441, 08484	Railway Support Services	Crown Point Depot, Norwich	08484 carries the name CAPTAIN NATHANIEL DARELL
08480, 08511	Railway Support Services	Felixstowe Terminal, Suffolk	
08507	Railway Support Services	Cholsey & Wallingford Railway, Oxfordshire	
08516	Railway Support Services	Arriva Train Care, Bristol Barton Hill	
08580	Railway Support Services	Garston Car Terminal, Liverpool	
08670	Railway Support Services	Bescot Yard, West Midlands	
08683	Railway Support Services	Eastleigh East Yard, Hampshire	
08703	Railway Support Services	Willesden Euroterminal Stone Terminal, Greater London	Carries the name Jermaine
08738	Railway Support Services	Chasewater Railway, Staffordshire	
08846	Railway Support Services	Tyseley Depot, Birmingham	Carries the number "003"
08899	Railway Support Services	Whitemoor Yard, March, Cambridgeshire	Carries the name Midland Counties Railway/175 1839-2014
08939	Railway Support Services	Springs Branch Depot, Wigan, Greater Manchester	
08410, 08598, 08600, 08774, 08912	AV Dawson	Ayrton Rail Terminal, Middlesbrough	08774 carries the name ARTHUR VERNON DAWSON
08418, 08485, 08678	West Coast Railways	Carnforth Depot, Lancashire	08678 carries the number "555"
08442, 08735, 08810	Arriva UK Trains	Arriva Train Care, Eastleigh, Hampshire	08442 carries the number "0042"; 08735 carries the name Geoff Hobbs 42; 08810 carries the name RICHARD J. WENHAM/EASTLEIGH DEPOT/DECEMBER 1989 - JULY 1999
08447	Russell Logistics	Assentra Rail, Hamilton, Glasgow	
08451	Alstom	Arlington Fleet Services, Eastleigh, Hampshire	
08454, 08721	Alstom	Widnes Technology Centre, Cheshire	08721 Carries the name Ken Davies
08611, 08696	Alstom	Wembley Depot, Greater London	
08617	Alstom	Oxley Depot, Wolverhampton	Carries the name Steve Purser
08764, 08887, 08954	Alstom	Polmadie Depot, Glasgow	
08790	Alstom	Longsight Depot, Greater Manchester	Carries the name LONGSIGHT TMD
08483, 08780	Locomotive Services Limited	Crewe Diesel Depot, Cheshire	08483 carries the name Bungle; 08780 carries the name Zippy and the number "D3948"
08631	Locomotive Services Limited	Weardale Railway, Wolsingham, County Durham	
08737	Locomotive Services Limited	Southall Depot, Greater London	Carries the number "D3905"
08499	Transport for Wales	Canton Depot, Cardiff	Carries the name REDLIGHT
08525, 08690, 08908, 08950	Northern Trains	Neville Hill Depot, Leeds	08525 carries the name DUNCAN BEDFORD; 08690 carries the name DAVID THIRKILL; 08950 carries the name DAVID LIGHTFOOT
08530	Freightliner	Hunslet Engine Company, Barton-under-Needwood, Staffordshire	
08531	Freightliner	Felixstowe Terminal, Suffolk	
08575, 08785	Freightliner	Nemesis Rail, Burton-on-Trent, Staffordshire	
08585	Freightliner	Southampton Maritime, Hampshire	Carries the name Vicky
08624	Freightliner	Trafford Park Terminal, Greater Manchester	Carries the name Rambo PAUL RAMSEY
08691, 08891	Freightliner	Ipswich Yard, Suffolk	08691 carries the name Terri
08567	Arlington Fleet Services	Arlington Fleet Services, Eastleigh, Hampshire	
08605, 08704	Riviera Trains	Knottingley Depot, West Yorkshire	08605 carries the name WIGAN 2
08616	West Midlands Trains	Tyseley Depot, Birmingham	Carries the names TYSELEY 100/Bam Bam and the number "3783"
08805	West Midlands Trains	Soho Depot, Birmingham	Carries the name Hunslet
08629	Europhoenix	Eastleigh East Yard, Hampshire	
08641, 08644, 08836	Great Western Railway	Laira Depot, Plymouth	08641 carries the name Pride of Laira; 08644 carries the name Laira Diesel Depot/50 years 1962-2012
08645	Great Western Railway	Long Rock Depot, Penzance, Cornwall	Carries the name St. Piran
08822	Great Western Railway	St Philips Marsh Depot, Bristol	Carries the name Dave Mills
08649	Meteor Power	Wolverton Works, Milton Keynes, Buckinghamshire	Carries the name Bradwell
08650, 08933	Mendip Rail	Whatley Quarry, Somerset	
08787, 08947	Mendip Rail	Hunslet Engine Company, Barton-under-Needwood, Staffordshire	08787 carried the number "08296"; 08787 converted to battery power by Positive Traction and carries the name Battery Bill. Currently in service at Whatley Quarry
08743, 08903	SembCorp Utilities	Wilton, Middlesbrough	08743 carries the name Bryan Turner; 08903 carries the name John W Antill
08783, 08913	European Metal Recycling	Kingsbury Recycling Plant, Warwickshire	
08850	North Yorkshire Moors Railway		
08925	GB Railfreight	HNRC, Worksop Depot, Nottinghamshire	
08934	GB Railfreight	Whitemoor Yard, March, Cambridgeshire	Carries the number "D4164"
08937	Bardon Aggregates	Meldon Quarry, Devon	Carries the number "D4167"
08948	Eurostar	Temple Mills Depot, Greater London	
08956	LORAM	Barrow Hill Roundhouse, Chesterfield, Derbyshire	
08757, 08922	Unknown	Rye Farm, Wishaw, Sutton Coldfield, West Midlands	08757 carries the name EAGLE C.U.R.C.
08784	Unknown	Nottingham Transport Heritage Centre, Ruddington	
08795	Unknown	Landore Depot, Swansea	
08825	Unknown	Bescot Yard, West Midlands	
08870	Unknown	Great Yarmouth, Norfolk	

== Preservation ==
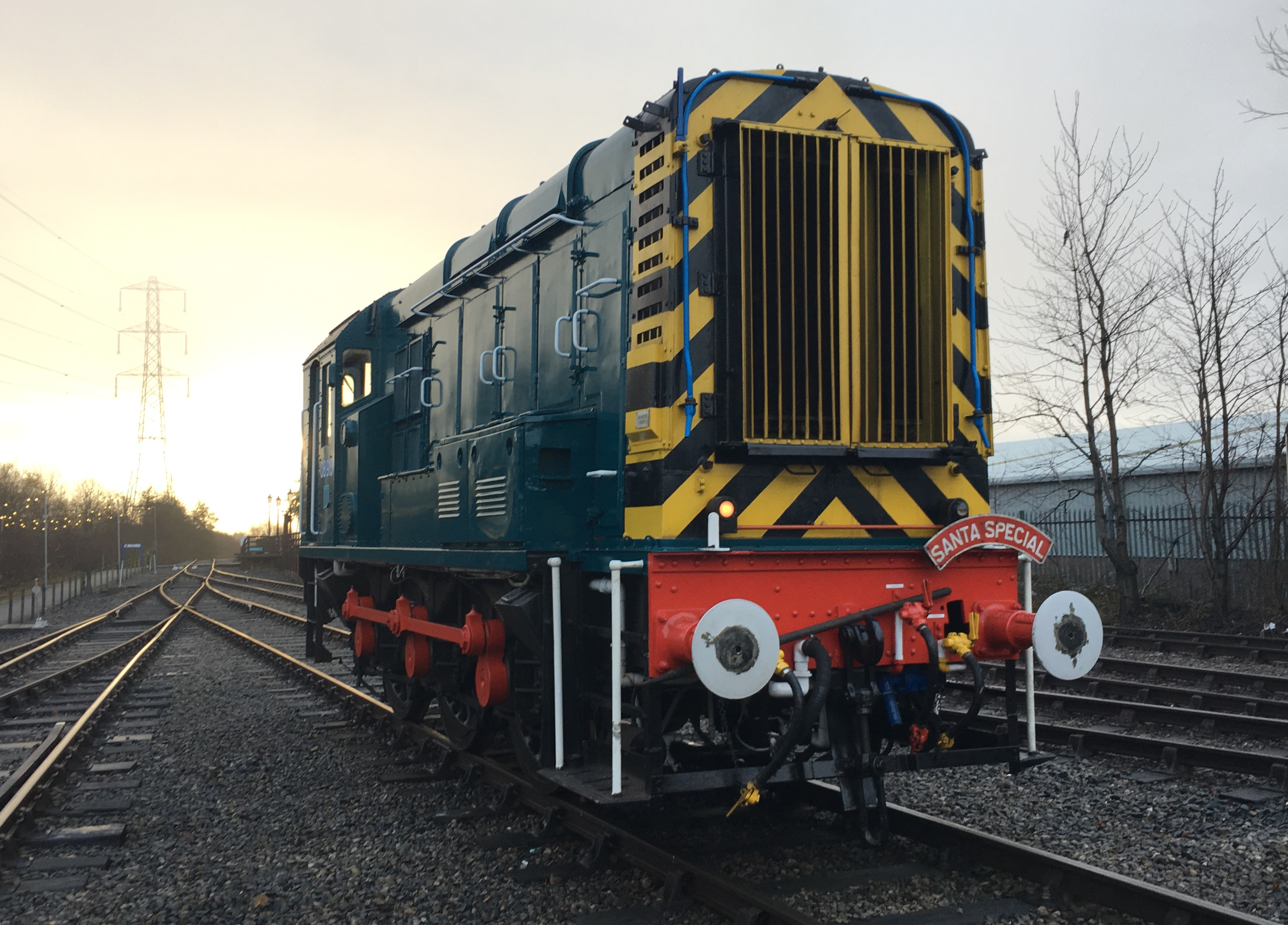
08 915 at the North Tyneside Steam Railway

Continuing in its designed-for role as a shunter, the Class 08 has been found useful by numerous heritage railways in the UK. With over 70 examples preserved, they are the second most numerous class of preserved locomotive in the UK.

== Models ==
Several manufacturers have produced models of Class 08 shunters. In OO scale, Wrenn, Tri-ang, Hornby Railways and Bachmann Branchline all produced models. Lima also produced a model in several different liveries, but it was of the near-identical Class 09.

Since 2000, both Bachmann Branchline and Hornby have released much more detailed models, in a variety of liveries and with a variety of appropriate detail variations. Accurascale have announced plans to produce models of both the class 08 and 08/9 in OO gauge scale.

In British N gauge, Graham Farish produced a relatively crude all-metal version, made in England, lacking outside frames and with a too-wide bonnet that was discontinued in 2007. A more detailed version with outside frames and a scale-width diecast bonnet was unveiled 2008 under the brand Graham Farish by Bachmann following the sale of the company.
