= List of British Railways shed codes =

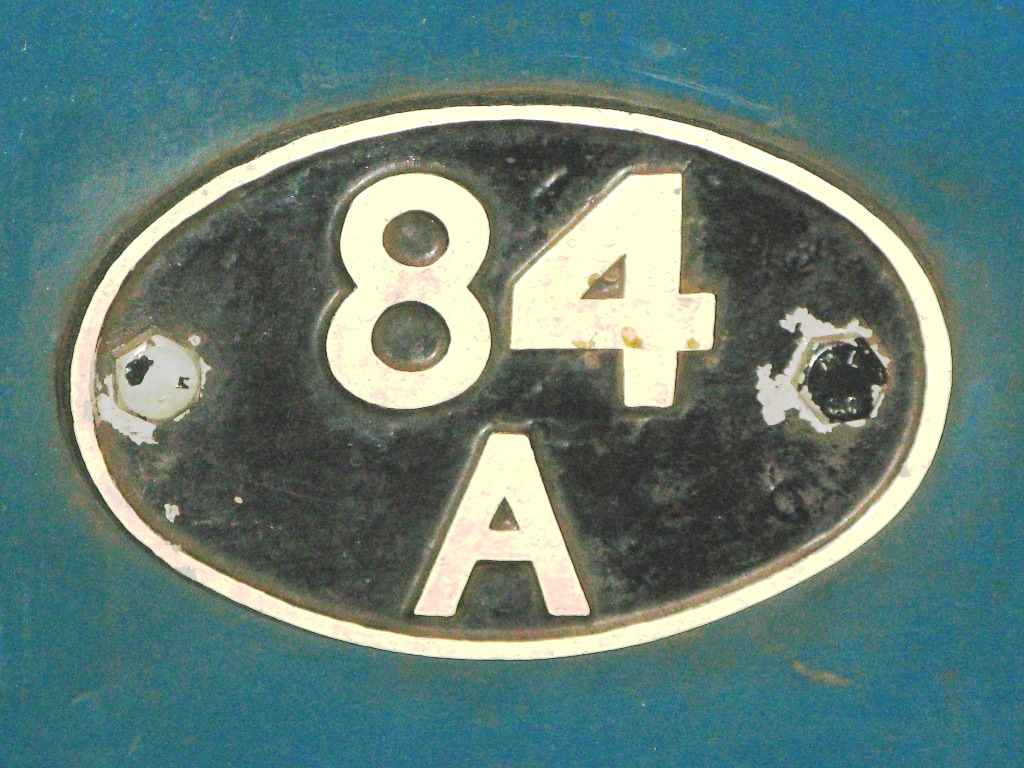
A "shed plate" for depot 84A (Laira)

British Railways shed codes were used to identify the engine sheds that its locomotives and multiple units were allocated to for maintenance purposes. The former London, Midland and Scottish Railway (LMS) alpha-numeric system was extended to cover all regions and used until replaced by alphabetic codes in 1973.

== System of codes ==
The coding system had its origins in a reorganisation of locomotive operation and maintenance on the LMS in the 1933-35 period. It grouped all sheds into districts with a main shed, given the district number followed by the letter A as its code, and subsidiary sheds with the same number followed by B, C, or D etc. Many sheds were also responsible for sub-sheds where day-to-day servicing could be carried out but which lacked the facilities for intermediate or heavy overhauls. The extension of the system to all regions was brought into use in 1950, each region being given a block of district numbers:

- 1 – 28 London Midland Region
- 30 – 41 Eastern Region
- 50 – 56 North Eastern Region
- 60 – 68 Scottish Region
- 70 – 75 Southern Region
- 81 – 89 Western Region

Many codes changed as districts were re-organised and as regional boundaries changed over the years. For example, the former LMS shed at Goole was initially 25C as part of the Wakefield District. In September 1956 the district was transferred to the North Eastern Region and split between districts 53, 55 and 56; Goole became 53E in the Hull District. This district was itself merged with the York District in January 1960 and so Goole was re-coded again to become 50D. The changes accelerated with the contraction of the railway network and modernisation, both of which reduced the number of locomotives in use. For example, the Inverness district had five sheds and seven sub-sheds in 1950 but these had been reduced to a single shed by 1967.

On 6 May 1973 all the remaining depot codes were replaced by new two-letter codes. These no longer included any kind of district hierarchy, but were more suitable for use with the TOPS operating management computers.

== Locomotive allocations ==
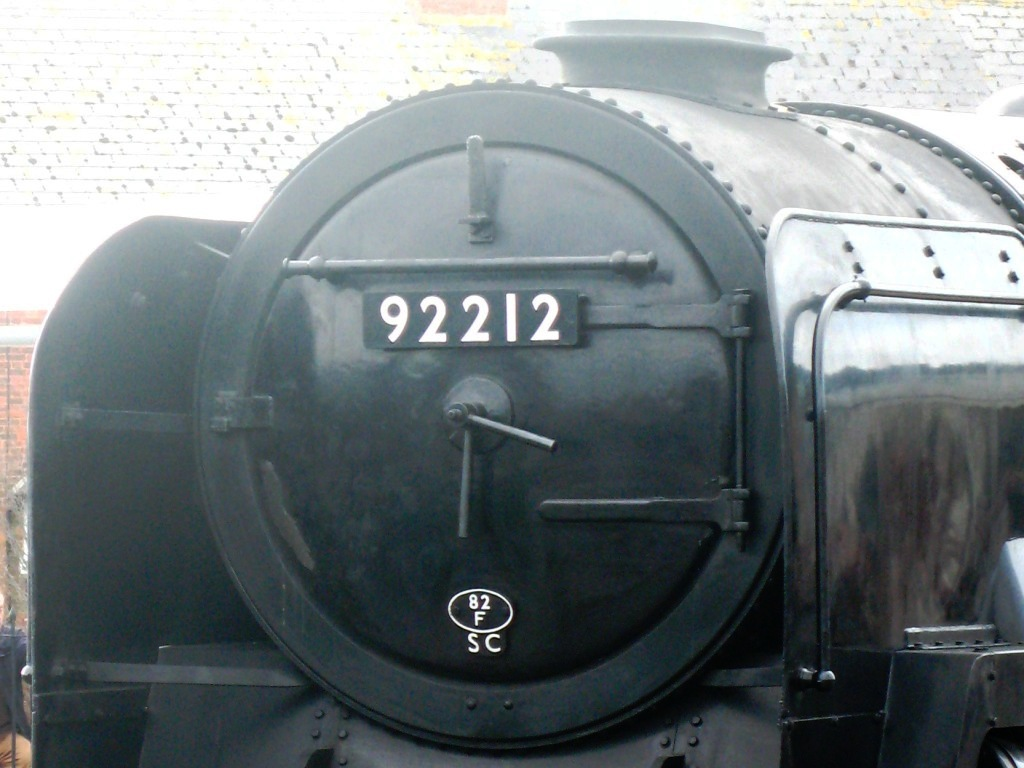
An 82F (Bath S&D) plate on the smokebox of 9F 92212

Each steam locomotive was allocated to a particular shed and an oval, cast metal plate (usually 4 5/8 in × 7 1/2 in (120 mm × 190 mm)) with the depot code was bolted to the smokebox on the front of the locomotive. When a locomotive was reallocated to a different shed the plate was taken off and replaced with one from the new shed. Locomotives moved between a parent depot and its sub-sheds did not need this change as they shared the same code.

With the introduction of diesel and electric motive power the system of allocation became changed. Main line locomotives were capable of operating greater distances between servicing and, very often, depots only held the equipment and spare parts for servicing a limited range of locomotive classes. This resulted in them being allocated to a smaller number of depots and reallocations became less common. For instance, the 74 Western Region Class 52 diesel-hydraulics were only ever allocated to six depots and were eventually all based to just one (Laira) rather than spread around more than 60 depots on the region, although they could often be found at many of these others. This meant that many depots only had allocations of shunting locomotives, and some locomotives did not carry allocation plates. Those that did had them in a variety of positions: Class 42s on the underframe below the cab but near-identical Class 43s on the front next to the left buffer; after 1967 the code was generally painted on the bodywork near the cab door. On the London Midland Region, from June 1968 until 1973 main line diesel locomotives were given a divisional allocation in which locomotives were allocated to a nominal district, although in practice the locomotives received major attention at the principal depot in the Division. For example, locomotives in the D01 London (Western) Division were effectively based at principal depot Willesden. Other divisions were D02 Birmingham Division (Tyseley), D05 Stoke-on-Trent Division (Crewe), D08 Liverpool Division (Allerton), D09 Manchester Division (Longsight), D10 Preston Division (Lostock Hall), D14 London (Midland) Division (Cricklewood Depot), D16 Nottingham Division (Toton).

== List of codes ==
=== London Midland Region ===
Code	Dates	Shed	Comments
1 Willesden
1A	1950–1973	Willesden	Became WN
1B	1950–1966	Camden	
1C	1950–1965	Watford	
1D	1950–1963	Devons Road, Bow	Became 1J
1D	1963–1973	Marylebone station	Previously 14F, became ME
1E	1952–1973	Bletchley; Sub-sheds Aylesbury (to 1962), Cambridge (to ?), Leighton Buzzard (to 1962), Newport Pagnell (to 1955)	Became BY
1F	1963–1968	Rugby	Previously 2A
1G	1963–1965	Woodford Halse	Previously 2F
1H	1963–1965	Northampton	Previously 2E
1J	1963–1964	Devons Road, Bow	Previously 1D
2 Rugby
2A	1950–1963	Rugby; Sub-sheds Market Harborough (to 1955), Seaton (to 1960)	Became 1F
2A	1963–1973	Tyseley	Was 84E until 1963. Closed to steam 1967. Later TOPS code TS.
2B	1950–1950	Bletchley	Became 4A
2B	1950–1963	Nuneaton	Previously 2D, became 5E
2B	1963–1968	Wolverhampton Oxley	
2C	1950–1950	Northampton	Became 4B
2C	1950–1958	Warwick (Milverton)	Previously 2E
2C	1963–1967	Stourbridge Junction	Was 84F until 1963. Closed to steam 1966
2D	1950–1950	Nuneaton	Became 2B
2D	1950–1958	Coventry	Previously 2F
2D	1963–1966	Banbury	Was 84C until 1963. Closed to steam 1966
2E	1950–1950	Warwick (Milverton)	Became 2C
2E	1952–1963	Northampton; Sub-shed Blisworth	Previously 4B, became 1H
2E	1963–1973	Saltley	Became SY
2F	1950–1950	Coventry	Previously 2F
2F	1955–1958	Market Harborough	Became 15F
2F	1958–1963	Woodford Halse	Previously 2G, became 1G
2F	1963–1973	Bescot	Previously 21B, became BS
2G	1958–1958	Woodford Halse	Previously 38E, became 2F
2G	1963–1967	Rycroft, Walsall	Previously 21F
2H	1963–1967	Monument Lane	Previously 21E
2J	1963–1965	Aston	Previously 21D
2K	1963–1965	Wolverhampton Bushbury	Previously 21C
2L	1963–1965	Leamington Spa	Was 84D until 1963. Closed to steam 1965
2M	1963–1964	Wellington (Salop)	Was 84H until 1963. Closed to steam 1964
2P	1963–1964	Kidderminster	Was 84G until 1963. Closed to steam 1964
3 Bescot
3A	1950–1960	Bescot	Became 21B
3B	1950–1960	Bushbury	Became 21C
3C	1950–1960	Rycroft	Became 21F
3D	1950–1960	Aston	Became 21D
3E	1950–1960	Monument Lane; Sub-sheds Albion (to ?), Tipton (to ?)	Became 21E
4 Bletchley (until 1952)
4A	1950–1952	Bletchley; Sub-sheds Aylesbury, Cambridge, Leighton Buzzard, Newport Pagnell, Oxford (1950)	Previously 2B, became 1E
4B	1950–1952	Northampton; Sub-shed Blisworth	Previously 2C, became 2E
5 Stoke Division (D05)
5A	1950–1965	Crewe North	
5A	1965–1973	Crewe Diesel Depot	Became CE, then CD
5B	1950–1967	Crewe South	
5C	1950–1965	Stafford	
5D	1950–1967	Stoke	
5E	1950–1962	Alsager	
5E	1963–1966	Nuneaton	Previously 2B
5F	1950–1966	Uttoxeter	
5H	1963–1965	WCML electric locomotive fleet	Code ACL used 1960–1963 and from 1966
6 Chester
6A	1950–1973	Chester (Midland)	
6B	1950–1966	Mold Junction	
6C	1950–1963	Birkenhead Mollington Street	Became 8H
6C	1963–1967	Croes Newydd; Sub-sheds Bala (to 1965), Penmaenpool (to 1965)	Was 89B until 1963. Closed to steam 1967
6D	1950–1960	Chester (Northgate)	
6D	1963–1967	Shrewsbury	Was 89A until 1963. Closed to steam 1967
6E	1950–1958	Wrexham Rhosddu	Became 84K
6E	1958–1960	Chester (WR)	Was 84K until 1958. Closed to steam 1960
6E	1963–1965	Oswestry	Was 89D until 1963. Closed to steam 1965
6F	1950–1963	Bidston	
6F	1963–1966	Machynlleth; Sub-sheds Aberystwyth (to 1965), Pwllhelli (to 1966)	Was 89C until 1963. Closed to steam 1966
6F	1967–1973	Aberystwyth VoR	Became VR
6G	1952–1966	Llandudno Junction	Previously 7A
6H	1952–1965	Bangor	Previously 7B
6J	1952–1967	Holyhead	Previously 7C
6K	1952–1963	Rhyl; Sub-shed Denbigh (to 1955)	Previously 7D
7 Llandudno Junction (until 1952)
7A	1950–1952	Llandudno Junction	Became 6G
7B	1950–1952	Bangor	Became 6H
7C	1950–1952	Holyhead	Became 6J
7D	1950–1952	Rhyl; Sub-shed Denbigh	Became 6K
8 Liverpool Edge Hill
8A	1950–1968	Edge Hill (Liverpool)	Became sub-shed of 8J
8B	1950–1967	Warrington (Dallam); Sub-shed Warrington (Arpley) (to 1963)	
8C	1950–1968	Speke Junction	
8D	1950–1964	Widnes	Previously sub-shed of 13E
8E	1950–1958	Brunswick (Liverpool)	Previously 13E, became 27F
8E	1958–1968	Northwich	Previously 9G
8F	1958–1973	Springs Branch (Wigan); Sub-shed Sutton Oak (1967–1969)	Previously 10A, became SP
8G	1950–1967	Sutton Oak	Became sub-shed of 8F
8H	1960–1963	Allerton	Became 8J
8H	1963–1967	Birkenhead Mollington Street	Previously 6C, became BC
8J	1963–1973	Allerton	Previously 8H, became AN
8K	1963–1966	Bank Hall	Previously 27A
8L	1963–1967	Aintree	Previously 27B
8M	1963–1967	Southport	Previously 27C
8P	1963–1964	Wigan Central	Previously 27D
8R	1963–1963	Walton	Previously 27E
9 Manchester Longsight
9A	1950–1973	Longsight (Manchester)	Became LG (electric) and LO (diesel)
9B	1950–1968	Stockport (Edgeley)	
9C	1958–1961	Macclesfield; Sub-shed Reddish (1958–1963)	Previously sub-shed of 39A
9C	1963–1973	Reddish; Sub-shed Dinting	Previously sub-shed of 39A, became RS
9D	1950–1963	Buxton	Became 9L
9D	1963–1973	Newton Heath	Previously 26A, became NH
9E	1950–1968	Trafford Park (Manchester)	Previously 13A, coded 17F 1957–58
9F	1950–1968	Heaton Mersey	Previously 13C, coded 17E 1957–58
9G	1950–1958	Northwich	Previously 13D, became 8E
9G	1958–1965	Gorton; Sub-shed Reddish (1958–1963)	Previously 9H
9H	1958–1958	Gorton; Sub-shed Dinting (1958)	Previously 39A, became 9G
9J	1963–1966	Agecroft	Previously 26B
9K	1963–1968	Bolton	Previously 26C
9L	1963–1968	Buxton; Sub-sheds Cromford (1963–1967), Middleton Top (1963–1967), Sheep Pasture (1963–1967)	Previously 9D
9M	1963–1965	Bury	Previously 26D
9P	1963–1964	Lees (Oldham)	Previously 26E
10 Wigan (until 1958) Carnforth (from 1963)
10A	1950–1958	Springs Branch (Wigan)	Became 8F
10A	1963–1968	Carnforth	Previously 24L
10B	1950–1958	Preston	Became 24K
10B	1963–1964	Blackpool Central; Sub-shed Blackpool North	Previously 28A, became sub-shed of 10C
10C	1950–1958	Patricroft	Became 26F
10C	1963–1968	Fleetwood	Previously 28B
10D	1950–1954	Plodder Lane	
10D	1955–1958	Sutton Oak	Previously 10E, became 8G
10D	1963–1972	Lostock Hall (Preston)	Previously 24C
10E	1950–1955	Sutton Oak	Became 10D
10F	1950–1952	Lower Ince, Wigan	Previously 13G
10F	1963–1968	Rose Grove	Previously 24B
10G	1963–1967	Skipton	Previously 23A
10H	1963–1967	Lower Darwen	Previously 24D
10J	1963–1966	Lancaster (Green Ayre)	Previously 24J
11 Carnforth / Barrow
11A	1950–1958	Carnforth	Became 24L
11A	1958–1960	Barrow-in-Furness	Previously 11B, became 12E
11B	1950–1958	Barrow-in-Furness	Became 11A
11B	1958–1969	Workington	Previously 12C, became 12F
11C	1950–1960	Oxenholme	Became 12G
11D	1950–1960	Tebay	Became 12H
11E	1951–1957	Lancaster (Green Ayre)	Previously 23C, became 24J
12 Carlisle
12A	1950–1958	Carlisle (Upperby)	Code 12B until 10 June 1950 and again from 1 February 1958
12A	1958–1973	Carlisle (Kingmoor); Sub-shed Durran Hill (to 1959)	Previously 68A
12B	1950–1950	Carlisle (Upperby)	Became 12A 10 June 1950
12B	1950–1951	Carlisle (Canal)	Became 68E
12B	1955–1955	Penrith	Previously 12C, reopened as sub-shed 1958
12B	1958–1968	Carlisle (Upperby); Sub-shed Penrith (1958–1962)	Previously 12A
12C	1950–1955	Penrith; Sub-shed Silloth (to 1953)	Became 12B
12C	1955–1958	Workington	Previously 12D, became 11B
12C	1958–1963	Carlisle (Canal)	Previously 12D, became 12C
12C	1963–1977	Barrow-in-Furness	Previously 12E
12D	1950–1955	Workington	Became 12C
12D	1958–1958	Carlisle (Canal)	Previously 68E, became 12C
12D	1958–1961	Kirkby Stephen	Previously 12E
12D	1963–1968	Workington	Previously 12F
12E	1950–1954	Moor Row	
12E	1958–1958	Kirkby Stephen	Previously 51H, became 12D
12E	1960–1963	Barrow-in-Furness	Previously 11, became 12C
12E	1963–1968	Tebay	Previously 12H
13 Manchester Trafford Park (until 22 May 1950)
13A	1950–1950	Trafford Park	Became 9E
13B	1950–1950	Belle Vue; Sub-shed Gowhole	Became 26G
13C	1950–1950	Heaton Mersey	Became 9F
13D	1950–1950	Northwich	Became 9G
13E	1950–1950	Brunswick (Liverpool); Sub-shed Widnes	Became 8E
13F	1950–1950	Walton	Became 27E
13G	1950–1950	Lower Ince, Wigan	Became 10F
14 Cricklewood
14A	1950–1963	Cricklewood	Became Cricklewood West (14B)
14A	1963–1973	Cricklewood East	Became CD, later CW
14B	1950–1963	Kentish Town	
14B	1963–1967	Cricklewood West	Previously Cricklewood (14A)
14C	1950–1960	St Albans	
14C	1963–1971	Bedford	Previously 14E
14D	1950–1962	Neasden; Sub-shed Marylebone station (to 1961)	
14E	1958–1963	Bedford	Previously 15D, became 14C
14F	1961–1963	Marylebone	Previously sub-shed of 14D, became 1D
15 Wellingborough
15A	1950–1963	Wellingborough; Sub-shed Market Harborough (1963–1965)	Became 15B
15A	1963–1973	Leicester (Midland)	Previously 15C, became LR
15B	1950–1963	Kettering	Became 15C
15B	1963–1973	Wellingborough	Previously 15A, became WO
15C	1950–1963	Leicester (Midland); Sub-shed Market Harborough (from 1960)	Became 15A
15C	1963–1965	Kettering	Previously 15B
15D	1950–1958	Bedford	Became 14E
15D	1950–1963	Coalville	Previously 17C, became 15E
15D	1963–1964	Leicester (Great Central)	Previously 15E
15E	1958–1963	Leicester (Great Central)	Previously 38C, became 15D
15E	1963–1965	Coalville	Previously 15D
15F	1958–1960	Market Harborough	Previously 2F, became sub-shed of 15C
16 Nottingham (until 1963) Toton (from 1963)
16A	1950–1963	Nottingham (Midland); Sub-sheds Lincoln St Marks (to 1953), Southwell (to 1955)	Became 16D
16A	1963–1973	Toton	Previously 18A, became TO
16B	1950–1950	Peterborough (Spital Bridge)	Became 35C
16B	1955–1963	Kirkby-in-Ashfield	Previously 16C, became 16E
16B	1963–1966	Annesley	Previously 16D
16B	1966–1970	Colwick	Previously 40E
16C	1950–1955	Kirkby-in-Ashfield	Became 16B
16C	1955–1960	Mansfield	Previously 16D
16C	1963–1973	Derby; Sub-shed Rowsley (1964–1967)	Previously 17A, became DY
16D	1950–1955	Mansfield	Became 16C
16D	1958–1963	Annesley	Previously 38B, became 16B
16D	1963–1967	Nottingham	Previously 16A
16E	1963–1966	Kirkby-in-Ashfield	Previously 16B
16F	1963–1973	Burton-on-Trent	Previously 17B, became BU
16G	1963–1966	Westhouses	Previously 18B
16H	1963–1964	Hasland; Sub-sheds Chesterfield (1963), Clay Cross Works (1963), Morton Colliery (1963), Williamsthorpe Colliery	Previously 18C
16J	1963–1964	Rowsley	Previously 17C, became sub-shed of 16C
17 Derby (until 9 September 1963)
17A	1950–1963	Derby	Became 16C
17B	1950–1963	Burton-on-Trent; Sub-sheds Horninglow (to 1960), Overseal (to ?)	Became 16F
17C	1950–1958	Coalville	Became 15D
17C	1958–1963	Rowsley; Sub-sheds Cromford (to 1960), Middleton Top (to ?), Sheep Pasture	Previously 17D, became 16J
17D	1950–1958	Rowsley; Sub-sheds Cromford, Middleton Top, Sheep Pasture	
17E	1957–1958	Heaton Mersey	Code 9F to January 1957 and from April 1958
17F	1957–1958	Trafford Park	Code 9E to January 1957 and from April 1958
18 Toton (until 9 September 1963)
18A	1950–1963	Toton	Became 16A
18B	1950–1963	Westhouses	Became 16G
18C	1950–1963	Hasland; Sub-sheds Chesterfield, Clay Cross Works, Morton Colliery, Williamsthorpe Colliery	Became 16H
18D	1950–1958	Barrow Hill (Staveley); Sub-sheds Sheepbridge, Staveley New Works, Staveley Old Works	Became 41E
19 Sheffield (until 1 February 1958)
19A	1950–1958	Sheffield Grimesthorpe	Became 41B
19B	1950–1958	Millhouses (Sheffield)	Became 41C
19C	1950–1958	Canklow	Became 41D
20 Leeds (until 3 February 1957)
20A	1950–1957	Leeds (Holbeck)	Became 55A
20B	1950–1957	Leeds (Stourton)	Became 55B
20C	1950–1957	Royston	Became 55D
20D	1950–1957	Normanton	Became 55E
20E	1950–1957	Bradford (Manningham); Sub-shed Ilkley	Became 55F
20F	1950–1950	Skipton; Sub-shed Keighley	Code 23A 26 June 1950 to 7 October 1951, became 24G
20G	1950–1957	Hellifield	Code 23B 26 June 1950 to 7 October 1951, became 24H
20H	1950–1950	Lancaster (Green Ayre)	Became 23C
21 Saltley (until 9 September 1963)
21A	1950–1963	Saltley (Birmingham); Sub-sheds Camp Hill, Kingsbury, Water Orton, Stratford-upon-Avon (1953–1962)	Became 2C
21B	1950–1960	Bournville; Sub-shed Redditch	
21C	1950–1958	Bromsgrove	Became 85F
21C	1960–1963	Bushbury	Previously 3B, became 2K
21D	1950–1953	Stratford-upon-Avon; Sub-shed Blisworth (to 7 July 1950)	Became sub-shed of 21A
21D	1950–1973	Aston	Previously 3D, became 2J
21E	1960–1963	Monument Lane	Previously 3E, became 2H
21F	1950–1963	Ryecroft (Walsall)	Previously 3C, became 2G
22 Bristol (until 1 February 1958)
22A	1950–1958	Bristol (Barrow Road)	Became 82E
22B	1950–1958	Gloucester (Barnwood); Sub-sheds Dursley, Tewkesbury	Became 85E
23 Liverpool Bank Hall (until 10 June 1950) Skipton (24 June 1950 to 7 October 1951)
23A	1950–1950	Liverpool (Bank Hall)	Became 27A
23A	1950–1951	Skipton	Code 20F until 24 June 1950 and from 7 October 1951
23B	1950–1950	Aintree	Became 27B
23B	1950–1951	Hellifield	Code 20G until 24 June 1950 and from 7 October 1951
23C	1950–1950	Southport	Became 27C
23C	1950–1951	Lancaster (Ayre Green)	Code 20H until 24 June 1950 and from 7 October 1951
23D	1950–1950	Wigan (L&Y)	Became 27D
24 Accrington (until 9 September 1963)
24A	1950–1963	Accrington	Became 10E
24B	1950–1963	Rose Grove	Became 10F
24C	1950–1963	Lostock Hall	Became 10D
24D	1950–1963	Lower Darwen	Became 10H
24E	1950–1963	Blackpool Central; Sub-shed Blackpool North	Code 28A 10 June 1950 to 1 April 1952, became 10B
24F	1950–1963	Fleetwood	Code 28B 10 June 1960 to 1 April 1952, became 10C
24G	1957–1963	Skipton	Previously 20F, became 10G
24H	1957–1963	Hellifield	Previously 20G
24J	1957–1963	Lancaster (Green Ayre)	Previously 11E, became 10J
24K	1958–1961	Preston	Previously 10B
24L	1958–1963	Carnforth	Previously 11A, became 10A
25 Wakefield (until September 1956)
25A	1950–1956	Wakefield	Became 56A
25B	1950–1957	Huddersfield	Became 55G
25C	1950–1956	Goole	Became 53E
25D	1950–1956	Mirfield	Became 56D
25E	1950–1956	Sowerby Bridge	Became 56E
25F	1950–1956	Low Moor	Became 56F
25G	1950–1956	Farnley Junction	Became 55C
26 Newton Heath (until 9 September 1963)
26A	1950–1963	Newton Heath	Became 9D
26B	1950–1963	Agecroft	Became 9J
26C	1950–1963	Bolton	Became 9K
26D	1950–1963	Bury	Became 9M
26E	1950–1954	Bacup	
26E	1955–1963	Lees (Oldham)	Previously 26F, became 9P
26F	1950–1955	Lees (Oldham)	Became 26E
26F	1955–1956	Belle Vue (Manchester)	Previously 13B, became 26G
26F	1958–1963	Patricroft	Previously 10C, became 9H
26G	1950–1955	Belle Vue (Manchester)	Previously 13B, became 26F
27 Liverpool Bank Hall (10 June 1950 to 9 September 1963)
27A	1950–1963	Liverpool (Bank Hall)	Previously 23A, became 8K
27B	1950–1963	Aintree	Previously 23B, became 8L
27C	1950–1963	Southport	Previously 23C, became 8M
27D	1950–1963	Wigan (L&Y)	Previously 23D, became 8P
27E	1950–1963	Walton	Previously 13F, became 8R
27F	1950–1961	Brunswick (Liverpool)	Previously 8E
28 Blackpool (10 June 1950 to 1 April 1952)
28A	1950–1952	Blackpool Central; Sub-shed Blackpool North	Code 24E until 10 June 1950 and from 1 April 1952
28B	1950–1952	Fleetwood	Code 24F until 10 June 1950 and from 1 April 1952

=== Eastern Region ===
Code	Dates	Shed	Comments
30 Stratford
30A	1950–1973	Stratford; Sub-sheds Bishops Stortford (1959–1960), Brentwood (to 1957), Canning Town (to ?), Chelmsford (to ?), Clacton (1959–1963), Colchester (1967–1968), Enfield (to 1960), Epping (to 1957), Hertford East (1960), Ilford, Palace Gates (to 1954), Spitalfields (to ?), Ware (to ?), Wood Street (to ?), Temple Mills (to 1964), Walton-on-the-Naze (1959–1963)	Became SX, later SF
30B	1950–1960	Hertford East; Sub-sheds Buntingford (to 1959)	Became sub-shed of 30A
30C	1950–1959	Bishops Stortford	Became sub-shed of 30A in 1959
30D	1950–1956	Southend (Victoria)	Became sub-shed of 30A
30E	1950–1959	Colchester; Sub-sheds Braintree (to ?), Clacton, Kelevedon (to 1951), Maldon (to ?), Walton-on-the-Naze	Reopened as sub-shed of 30A 1967
30E	1968–1973	Colchester	Became CR
30F	1950–1967	Parkeston Quay	
31 Cambridge
31A	1950–1973	Cambridge; Sub-sheds Ely (to ?), Huntingdon East (to .1961), Saffron Walden (to 1958), Thaxted (to 1952)	Became CA
31B	1950–1973	March; Sub-sheds King's Lynn (1960–1962), South Lynn (1960–c.1961), Wisbech (1952–?)	Became MC, later MR
31C	1950–1960	King's Lynn; Sub-sheds Hunstanton (to 1958), South Lynn (1959–1960), Wisbech (to 1952)	Became sub-shed of 31B
31D	1950–1959	South Lynn	Became sub-shed of 31C
31E	1950–1959	Bury St Edmunds; Sub-shed Sudbury	
31F	1958–1960	Peterborough Spital Bridge	Previously 35C
32 Norwich
32A	1950–1973	Norwich; Sub-sheds Cromer High (to 1954), Dereham (to 1955), Swaffham (to ?), Wells (to 1963), Wymondham (to ?), Yarmouth South Town (1959–1962)	Became NO, later NR
32B	1950–1968	Ipswich; Sub-sheds Aldeburgh (to 1956), Felixstowe (to 1959), Framlingham (to 1952), Laxfield (to 1952), Stowmarket (to ?)	
32C	1950–1962	Lowestoft	
32D	1950–1959	Yarmouth South Town	Became sub-shed of 32A
32E	1950–1959	Yarmouth (Vauxhall)	
32F	1950–1959	Yarmouth Beach	
32G	1950–1959	Melton Constable; Sub-sheds Cromer Beach, Norwich City	
33 Plaistow
33A	1950–1959	Plaistow; Sub-sheds Upminster (to 1956)	Became sub-shed of 33B in 1959
33B	1950–1962	Tilbury; Sub-sheds Plaistow (1959–1962)	
33C	1950–1962	Shoeburyness	
34 Kings Cross (1950–1973)
34A	1950–1963	Kings Cross	
34B	1950–1961	Hornsey	Became sub-shed of 34G
34C	1950–1961	Hatfield	
34D	1950–1973	Hitchin	Became HI
34E	1950–1958	Neasden; Sub-sheds Aylesbury, Chesham	Became 14D
34E	1958–1968	New England; Sub-shed Spalding (to 1960)	Previously 35A
34F	1958–1963	Grantham	Previously 35B
34G	1960–1973	Finsbury Park; Sub-shed Hornsey (1961–1971)	Became FP
35 Peterborough (until 1958)
35A	1950–1958	New England; Sub-sheds Bourne (to 1953), Spalding, Stamford (to 1957)	Became 34E
35B	1950–1958	Grantham	Became 34F
35C	1950–1958	Peterborough Spital Bridge (was 16B 1949–1950)	Previously 16B, Became 31F
36 Doncaster
36A	1950–1973	Doncaster	Became DR
36B	1950–1958	Mexborough; Sub-shed Wath Electric Depot (from 1952)	Became 41F
36C	1950–1973	Frodingham	Became FH
36D	1950–1958	Barnsley	Became 41G
36E	1950–1965	Retford; Sub-shed Newark (to 1959)	
37 Ardsley (until 1956)
37A	1950–1956	Ardsley	Became 56B
37B	1950–1956	Copley Hill	Became 56C
37C	1950–1956	Bradford (Hammerton Street)	Became 56G
38 Colwick (until 1958)
38A	1950–1958	Colwick; Sub-shed Derby (to 1955)	Became 40E
38B	1950–1958	Annesley	Became 16D
38C	1950–1958	Leicester (GC); Sub-shed Leicester (GN)	Became 15E
38D	1950–1958	Staveley (GC)	Became 41H
38E	1950–1958	Woodford Halse	Became 2G
39 Gorton (until 1958)
39A	1950–1958	Gorton; Sub-sheds Hayfield (to ?), Macclesfield, Dinting	Became 9H
39B	1950–1955	Darnall (Sheffield)	Became 41A
40 Lincoln
40A	1950–1973	Lincoln	Became LN
40B	1950–1973	Immingham; Sub-sheds New Holland and Grimsby to 1960s	Became IM
40C	1950–1956	Louth	
40D	1950–1958	Tuxford	Became 41K
40E	1950–1958	Langwith Junction	became 41J
40E	1958–1966	Colwick	Previously 38A, became 16B
40F	1950–1964	Boston; Sub-shed Sleaford (to ?)	
41 Darnall
41A	1950–1964	Darnall (Sheffield)	Previously 39B, became 41B
41A	1964–1973	Tinsley	Became TI
41B	1958–1964	Sheffield Grimesthorpe	Previously 19A
41B	1964–1965	Darnall (Sheffield)	Previously 41A
41C	1958–1961	Sheffield (Millhouses)	Previously 19B
41C	1963–1973	Wath	Previously sub-shed of 41F
41D	1958–1965	Canklow	Previously 19C
41E	1958–1965	Staveley (Barrow Hill); Sub-sheds Sheepbridge, Staveley New Works, Staveley Old Works	Previously 18D
41F	1958–1964	Mexborough; Sub-shed Wath Electric Depot (1958–1963)	Previously 36B
41G	1958–1963	Barnsley	Previously 36D
41H	1958–1965	Staveley (G.C.)	Previously 38D
41J	1958–1966	Langwith Junction	Previously 40E
41J	1966–1973	Shirebrook West	Became SB
41K	1958–1959	Tuxford	Previously 40D

=== North Eastern Region ===
The North Eastern became part of an enlarged Eastern Region in 1967, however the shed codes remained unchanged.

Code	Dates	Shed	Comments
50 York
50A	1950–1967	York	Became 55B
50B	1950–1960	Neville Hill; Sub-shed Ilkley (to 1959)	Became 55H
50B	1960–1970	Dairycoates (Hull); Also used for Hull (Alexandra Dock) until closed in 1963.	Previously 53A and 53B.
50C	1950–1959	Selby	
50C	1960–1973	Hull (Botanic Gardens)	Was 53B. Became BG
50D	1950–1959	Starbeck; Sub-shed Pateley Bridge (to 1951)	
50D	1960–1973	Goole	
50E	1950–1963	Scarborough	
50F	1950–1963	Malton; Sub-shed Pickering (to 1959)	
50G	1950–1959	Whitby	
51 Darlington
51A	1950–1973	Darlington; Sub-shed Middleton-in-Teesdale (to 1957)	Became DN
51B	1950–1958	Newport	
51C	1950–1967	West Hartlepool	
51D	1950–1958	Middlesbrough; Sub-shed Guisborough (to 1954)	
51E	1950–1959	Stockton	
51F	1950–1965	West Auckland; Sub-shed Wearhead (to 1954)	
51G	1950–1959	Haverton Hill	
51H	1950–1958	Kirkby Stephen	Became 12E
51J	1950–1963	Northallerton; Sub-shed Leyburn (to 1954)	
51K	1950–1958	Saltburn	
51L	1958–1973	Thornaby	Became TE
52 Gateshead
52A	1950–1973	Gateshead; Sub-sheds Bowes Bridge (to 1962), Heaton (1963–1967), North Blyth (1967)	Became GD
52B	1950–1963	Heaton	Became sub-shed of 52A
52C	1950–1965	Blaydon; Sub-sheds Alston (to 1959), Hexham (to 1959), Reedsmouth (to 1952)	
52D	1950–1969	Tweedmouth; Sub-shed Alnmouth (to 1966)	
52E	1950–1966	Percy Main	
52F	1950–1967	North Blyth; Sub-sheds Rothbury (to 1952), South Blyth (1967)	Became sub-shed of 52A
52G	1958–1967	Sunderland; Sub-shed Durham (1958)	Previously 54A
52H	1958–1967	Tyne Dock	Previously 54B
52J	1958–1959	Borough Gardens	Previously 54C
52J	1964–1973	South Gosforth	Became GF
52K	1958–1965	Consett	
53 Hull (until 1960)
53A	1950–1960	Hull (Dairycoates)	Became 50B
53B	1950–1960	Hull (Botanic Gardens)	Became 50C
53C	1950–1960	Hull (Alexandra Dock)	Included Springhead until 1958
53D	1950–1958	Bridlington	
53E	1950–1951	Cudworth	
53E	1956–1960	Goole	Previously 25C, became 50D
Sunderland (until 1958)
54A	1950–1958	Sunderland; Sub-shed Durham	Became 52G
54B	1950–1958	Tyne Dock; Sub-shed Pelton Level (to ?)	Became 52H
54C	1950–1958	Borough Gardens	Became 52J
54D	1950–1958	Consett	Became 52K
Leeds Holbeck (from 1957)
55A	1957–1973	Leeds (Holbeck); Sub-shed Stourton (1967–c.1972)	Previously 20A, became HO
55B	1957–1967	Stourton	Became sub-shed of 55A
55B	1967–1973	York	Previously 50A, became YK
55C	1956–1966	Farnley Junction	Previously 25G
55C	1967–1973	Healey Mills	Previously 56B, became HM
55D	1957–1971	Royston	Previously 20C
55E	1957–1967	Normanton	Previously 20D
55F	1957–1967	Manningham (Bradford)	Previously 20E
55F	1967–1973	Hammerton Street (Bradford)	Previously 56G, became HS
55G	1957–1967	Huddersfield	Previously 25B
55G	1967–1973	Knottingley	Previously 56A, became KY
56 Wakefield/Knottingley (from 1956)
56A	1956–1967	Wakefield	Previously 25A
56A	1967–1967	Knottingley	Became 55G
56B	1956–1965	Ardsley	Previously 37A
56B	1966–1967	Healey Mills	Became 55C
56C	1956–1964	Copley Hill	Previously 37B
56D	1956–1967	Mirfield	Previously 25D
56E	1956–1964	Sowerby Bridge	Previously 25E
56F	1956–1967	Low Moor	Previously 25F, became 55J
56G	1956–1958	Hammerton Street (Bradford)	Previously 37C, became 55F

=== Scottish Region ===
Code	Dates	Shed	Comments
60 Inverness
60A	1950–1973	Inverness; Sub-sheds Dingwall (to 1962), Fortrose (to 1951), Kyle of Lochalsh (to 1962)	Became IS
60B	1950–1966	Aviemore; Sub-shed, Boat of Garten	Now used by the Strathspey Railway
60C	1950–1964	Helmsdale; Sub-sheds, Dornoch (to 1960), Tain (to 1959)	
60D	1950–1962	Wick; Sub-shed, Thurso	
60E	1950–1964	Forres	
61 Aberdeen
61A	1950–1967	Kittybrewster (Aberdeen); Sub-sheds Alford (to ?), Ballater (to 1966), Fraserburgh (to 1965), Macduff (to 1951), Peterhead (to 1965)	
61B	1950–1966	Aberdeen (Ferryhill)	Became AB
61C	1950–1966	Keith; Sub-sheds Banff (to 1964), Elgin	
62 Thornton Junction
62A	1950–1969	Thornton Junction; Sub-sheds, Anstruther (to 1960), Burntisland (to ?), Ladybank, Methil (to ?)	
62B	1950–1967	Dundee Tay Bridge; Sub-sheds, Arbroath (to 1959), Dundee West (to 1963), Montrose (to ?), St. Andrews (to 1960), Tayport (to 1951)	
62B	1967–1973	Dundee	Former Dundee West reopened, became DE
62C	1950–1966	Dunfermline; Sub-sheds, Alloa (to 1967), Inverkeithing (to ?), Kelty (to c.1955), Loch Leven (to 1951)	Became DT
63 Perth
63A	1950–1969	Perth; Sub-sheds Aberfeldy (to 1965), Blair Atholl (to 1965), Crieff (to 1958), Forfar (1959–1964)	
63B	1950–1960	Stirling; Sub-sheds Killin, Stirling Shore Road	Became 65J
63B	1960–1970	Fort William; Sub-shed Mallaig (to 1961)	Previously 65J, became 65H
63C	1950–1959	Forfar; Sub-shed Brechin, Ballaculish	Became sub-shed of 63A
63C	1959–1963	Oban; Sub-shed Ballachulish	Previously 63D
63D	1950–1955	Fort William	Became 65J
63D	1955–1959	Oban; Sub-shed Ballachulish	Previously 63E, became 63C
63E	1950–1955	Oban; Sub-shed Ballachulish	Became 63D
64 St. Margarets/Millerhill
64A	1950–1967	St. Margarets (Edinburgh); Sub-sheds Dunbar (to 1963), Galashiels (to c.1962), Hardengreen (to ?), Leith Central (1955 to 1959), Longniddry (to ?), North Berwick (to 1958), Peebles (to 1955), Penicuik (to 1951), Polton (to 1951), Seafield (to 1962), South Leith (to 1955)	
64A	1967–1973	Millerhill	Became MH
64B	1950–1973	Haymarket	Became HA
64C	1950–1965	Dalry Road	
64D	1950–1960	Carstairs	Became 66E
64E	1950–1960	Polmont; Sub-shed Kinneil	Became 65K
64F	1950–1966	Bathgate	
64G	1950–1966	Hawick; Sub-sheds Jedburgh (1950), Kelso (to 1955), Riccarton (to 1958), St. Boswells (to 1959)	
64H	1959–1972	Leith Central	Previously sub-shed of 64A
65 Eastfield
65A	1950–1973	Eastfield (Glasgow); Sub-sheds Aberfoyle (to 1951), Helensburgh (1960–1961), Kilsyth (to 1951), Kipps (1962), Lennoxtown (to 1951), Motherwell (from 1972), Parkhead (1962) Polmadie (from 1972)	Became ED
65B	1950–1966	St. Rollox	
65C	1950–1962	Parkhead	Became sub-shed of 65A
65D	1950–1964	Dawsholm; Sub-sheds Dumbarton, Stobcross (1950)	
65E	1950–1962	Kipps	Became sub-shed of 65A
65F	1950–1973	Grangemouth	Became GM
65G	1950–1964	Yoker	
65H	1950–1960	Helensburgh; Sub-shed Arrochar (to c.1959)	Became sub-shed of 65A
65H	1970–1973	Fort William	Previously 63B, became FW
65I	1950–1961	Balloch	
65J	1950–1960	Fort William; Sub-shed Mallaig	Previously 63D, became 63B
65K	1960–1964	Polmont	Previously 64E
66 Polmadie
66A	1950–1972	Polmadie; Sub-sheds Motherwell (from 1967), Paisley (to ?)	Became sub-shed of 65A, later PO
66B	1950–1963	Motherwell; Sub-shed Morningside (to 1954)	Became sub-shed of 66A
66C	1950–1973	Hamilton	Became HN
66D	1950–1966	Greenock (Ladyburn); Sub-shed Princes Pier (to 1959)	
66E	1960–1963	Carstairs	Previously 64D, reopened 1966–1967 then became a stabling point
66F	1962–1967	Beattock	Previously 68D
67 Corkerhill
67A	1950–1973	Corkerhill	Became CK
67B	1950–1966	Hurlford; Sub-sheds Beith (to ?), Muirkirk (to 1964)	
67C	1950–1973	Ayr	Became AY
67D	1950–1973	Ardrossan	
67E	1962–1966	Dumfries	Previously 68B
67F	1962–1968	Stranraer	Previously 68C
68 Carlisle Kingmoor
68A	1950–1966	Carlisle (Kingmoor); Sub-shed Durran Hill	Became 12A
68B	1950–1962	Dumfries; Sub-shed Kirkcudbright (to 1955)	Became 67E
68C	1950–1962	Stranraer; Sub-shed Newton Stewart (to 1959)	Became 67F
68D	1950–1962	Beattock; Sub-shed Lockerbie (to 1951)	Became 66F
68E	1951–1958	Carlisle Canal	Previously 12B, became 12D

=== Southern Region ===
Code	Dates	Shed	Comments
70 Nine Elms
70A	1950–1967	Nine Elms	
70B	1950–1970	Feltham	
70C	1950–1967	Guildford; Sub-shed Reading S.R. (1962–1964)	
70D	1950–1963	Basingstoke	
70D	1963–1973	Eastleigh; Sub-sheds Fratton, Lymington (to 1967), Southampton Docks (from 1966)	Previously 71A, became EH
70E	1950–1962	Reading (SR)	Became sub-shed of 70C
70E	1962–1967	Salisbury	Previously 72B
70F	1954–1959	Fratton	Became sub-shed of 71A, later FR
70F	1963–1973	Bournemouth	Previously 71B, became BM
70G	1954–1957	Newport (I.O.W.)	Previously 71E
70G	1963–1967	Weymouth	Was 71G until 1963. Closed to steam 1967
70H	1954–1973	Ryde (I.O.W.)	Became RY
70I	1950–1966	Southampton Docks	Previously 71I, became sub-shed of 70D
71 Eastleigh (until 30 September 1963)
71A	1950–1966	Eastleigh; Sub-sheds Andover Junction (to 1957), Fratton (from 1959), Lymington (to 1967), Southampton Terminus (to 1967), Winchester (to 1969)	Became 70D
71B	1950–1963	Bournemouth; Sub-sheds Dorchester (1955–1957), Hamworthy Junction (to 1954), Swanage (to 1966)	Became 70F
71C	1950–1955	Dorchester	Became sub-shed of 71B
71D	1950–1954	Fratton; Sub-sheds Gosport (to 1953)	Became 70F
71E	1950–1954	Newport (I.O.W.)	Became 70G
71F	1950–1954	Ryde (I.O.W.)	Became 70H
71G	1950–1958	Bath (S&D); Sub-sheds Branksome, Radstock	Became 82F
71G	1958–1963	Weymouth	Was 82F until 1958, became 70G in 1963
71H	1950–1958	Templecombe (S&D); Sub-sheds Highbridge (to c.1955)	Became 82G
71H	1958–1959	Yeovil Pen Mill	Previously 82E. Closed to steam 1959
71I	1950–1963	Southampton Docks	Became 70I
71J	c.1955–1958	Highbridge	Became sub-shed of 82F
72 Exmouth Junction
72A	1950–1963	Exmouth Junction; Sub-sheds Bude, Exmouth, Launceston (to c.1958), Lyme Regis, Okehampton (to c.1961), Seaton (to 1963.	Became 83D
72B	1950–1962	Salisbury	Became 70E
72C	1950–1963	Yeovil	Became 83E
72D	1950–1958	Plymouth Friary; Sub-shed Callington	Became 83H
72E	1950–1963	Barnstaple; Sub-sheds Ilfracombe, Torrington (to 1959)	Became 83F
72F	1950–1963	Wadebridge	Became 84E
73 Stewarts Lane/Hither Green
73A	1950–1962	Stewarts Lane	Became 75D
73B	1950–1962	Bricklayers Arms; Sub-sheds New Cross Gate (to 1952)	
73C	1950–1973	Hither Green; Sub-shed Redhill (1965–?)	Became HG
73D	1950–1959	Gillingham	Became sub-shed of 73J
73D	1963–1973	St Leonards	Became SE
73E	1950–1964	Faversham	
73F	1958–1973	Ashford; Sub-shed Ramsgate (locomotives, 1959–1960), St Leonards (to 1963?), Tonbridge (1962–1965)	Became AF
73G	1958–1973	Ramsgate	Previously 74B. EMUs only from 1959, became RM
73H	1958–1961	Dover; Sub-sheds Folkestone (to 1961)	Previously 74C
73J	1958–1965	Tonbridge; Sub-sheds Gillingham(1959–1960)	Became sub-shed of 73F
74 Ashford (until 13 October 1958)
74A	1950–1958	Ashford; Sub-sheds Canterbury West (to 1955), Rolvenden (to 1954), St Leonards (1958)	Became 73F
74B	1950–1958	Ramsgate	Became 73G
74C	1950–1958	Dover; Sub-sheds Folkestone	Became 73H
74D	1950–1958	Tonbridge	Became 73J
74E	1950–1958	St Leonards	Became sub-shed of 74A
75 Brighton
75A	1950–1973	Brighton; Sub-sheds Eastbourne (1952–1965), Horsham (1959–1964), Newhaven (to 1955), Three Bridges (1964–1965), Tunbridge Wells West (1963–1965)	Became BI
75B	1950–1965	Redhill; Sub-sheds Tunbridge Wells West (1965)	Became sub-shed of 73C
75C	1950–1966	Norwood Junction	
75C	1966–1973	Selhurst	Became SU
75D	1950–1959	Horsham	Became sub-shed of 75A
75D	1962–1973	Stewarts Lane	Previously 73A, became SL
75E	1950–1964	Three Bridges	Became sub-shed of 75A
75F	1950–1963	Tunbridge Wells West	Became sub-shed of 75A, later 75B and finally shed TW under TOPS. Now used by Spa Valley Railway
75G	1950–1952	Eastbourne	Became sub-shed of 75A

=== Western Region ===
Code	Dates	Shed	TOPS code	Comments
81 London
81A	1949–1973	Old Oak Common; Sub-shed Southall (1968–1973)	OC	Closed to steam 1965
81B	1949–1964	Slough; Sub-sheds Aylesbury (1950), Marlow (to 1962), Watlington (to 1957)		Closed to steam 1964
81C	1949–1968	Southall; Sub-shed Staines (to 1952)		Closed to steam 1965
81D	1949–1973	Reading; Sub-sheds Basingstoke WR (1950), Henley-on-Thames (to 1958)	RG	Closed to steam 1965
81E	1949–1965	Didcot; Sub-sheds Newbury (to ?), Wallingford (to 1956), Winchester Chesil (to 1953)		Closed to steam 1965
81F	1949–1973	Oxford; Sub-sheds Abingdon (to 1954), Fairford (to 1962)	OX	Closed to steam 1966
82 Bristol
82A	1949–1973	Bristol, Bath Road; Sub-sheds Bath (to 1961), Taunton (from 1968), Wells (to 1963), Westbury (from 1968), Weston-super-Mare (to 1960), Yatton (to 1960)	BR	Closed to steam 1960
82B	1949–1964	St Philips Marsh	PM	Closed to steam 1964
82C	1949–1973	Swindon; Sub-sheds Andover Junction (to 1952), Chippenham (to 1964), Malmesbury (to 1951), Marlborough (to 1961), Faringdon (to 1951)	SW	Closed to steam 1965
82D	1949–1963	Westbury; Sub-sheds Frome, Salisbury WR (1950)		Became 83C in 1963.
82E	1950–1958	Yeovil Pen Mill		Became 71H in 1958
82E	1958–1965	Bristol, Barrow Road		Previously 22A
82F	1949–1958	Weymouth; Sub-shed Bridport		Became 71G in 1958
82F	1958–1966	Bath S&D; Sub-sheds Branksome (to 1963), Highbridge (1958), Radstock		Previously 71G
82G	1958–1963	Templecombe		Previously 71H, became 83G
83 Newton Abbot
83A	1949–1973	Newton Abbot; Sub –sheds Ashburton (to 1958), Kingsbridge (to 1961), Tiverton Junction (1963–1964)	NA	Closed to steam 1963
83B	1949–1968	Taunton; Sub -sheds Barnstaple Town (to 1951), Bridgwater (to 1960), Minehead (to 1956)		Closed to steam 1964
83C	1949–1963	Exeter; Sub-sheds Tiverton Junction	EX	Closed to steam 1963
83C	1963–1968	Westbury	WY	Closed to steam 1965
83D	1949–1963	Plymouth, Laira; Sub-sheds Launceston (1958–1962), Plymouth Docks (to c.1951), Princetown (to 1956)		Became 84A in 1963
83D	1963–1967	Exmouth Junction; Sub-sheds Bude (to 1964), Callington (1963), Exmouth (1963), Lyme Regis (1963), Seaton (1963)		Previously 72A
83E	1949–1963	St Blazey; Sub-sheds (to 1962), Looe (to ?), Moorswater (to 1960)		Became 84B in 1962
83E	1963–1965	Yeovil Town		Previously 72C
83F	1949–1963	Truro		Became 84C Closed to steam 1962
83F	1963–1964	Barnstaple Junction; Sub-shed Ilfracombe		Previously 72E
83G	1950–1963	Penzance; Sub-sheds Helston, St Ives (to 1961)	PZ	Became 84D. Closed to steam 1962
83G	1963–1966	Templecombe		Previously 82G
83H	1958–1963	Plymouth Friary; Sub-shed Callington		Previously 72D
84 Wolverhampton (until 1963) Plymouth (from 1963)
84A	1949–1963	Wolverhampton, Stafford Road		Closed to steam 1963
84A	1963–1973	Plymouth, Laira	LA	Was 83D until 1963. Closed to steam 1964
84B	1949–1963	Wolverhampton, Oxley		Became 2B in 1963.
84B	1963–1973	St Blazey	BZ	Was 83E until 1962. Closed to steam 1962
84C	1949–1963	Banbury		Became 2D in 1963.
84C	1963–1965	Truro		Previously 83F
84D	1949–1963	Leamington Spa		Became 2L in 1963
84D	1963–1973	Penzance; Sub-shed Helston (1963)	PZ	Previously 83G
84E	1950–1963	Tyseley	TS	Became 2A in 1963
84F	1949–1963	Stourbridge Junction		Became 2C in 1963.
84G	1949–1961	Shrewsbury; Sub-sheds Builth Road, Clee Hill (to 1960), Coalport, Craven Arms, Knighton, Ludlow (to 1951)		Was 4A until 1949. Became 89A in 1960.
84G	1961–1963	Kidderminster; Sub-shed Cleobury Mortimer (to 1962)		Was 85D until 1960, became 2P in 1963.
84H	1949–1963	Wellington (Salop); Sub-sheds Crewe Gresty Lane, Much Wenlock (to 1951)		Became 2M in 1963.
84J	1949–1960	Croes Newydd; Sub-sheds Bala, Penmaenpool, Trawsfynydd		Became 89B in 1960.
84K	1949–1958	Chester	CH	Became 6E in 1958.
84K	1958–1960	Wrexham Rhosddu		Previously 6E
85 Worcester
85A	1949–1973	Worcester; Sub-sheds Evesham (to 1963), Hartlebury (to ?), Honeybourne (to 1965), Kingham (to 1962), Ledbury (1961–1964), Moreton in Marsh (to ?)	WS	Closed to steam 1965
85B	1949–1973	Gloucester, Horton Road; Sub-sheds Brimscombe (to 1963), Chalford (to 1951), Cheltenham Malvern Road (to 1963), Cirencester (to 1964), Lydney (to 1964), Tetbury (to 1964)	GL	Closed to steam 1965
85C	1949–1960	Hereford; Sub-sheds Kington (to 1951), Ledbury, Leominster, Ross-on-Wye		Became 86C in 1960.
85C	1961–1964	Gloucester, Barnwood; Sub-sheds Dursley (to 1962), Tewkesbury (to 1962)		Previously 85E
85D	1949–1960	Kidderminster; Sub-shed Cleobury Mortimer		Became 84G in 1960.
85D	1961–1964	Bromsgrove; Sub-shed Redditch		Previously 85F
85E	1958–1961	Gloucester, Barnwood; Sub-sheds Dursley, Tewkesbury		Previously 22B, became 85C
85F	1958–1961	Bromsgrove; Sub-shed Redditch		Previously 21C, became 85D
86 Newport / Cardiff
86A	1949–1963	Newport, Ebbw Junction		Became 86B in 1963
86A	1963–1973	Cardiff Canton	CF	Previously 86C
86B	1949–1963	Newport Pill		Closed to steam 1963
86B	1963–1973	Newport, Ebbw Junction	EJ	Was 86A until 1960. Closed to steam 1965
86C	1949–1960	Cardiff, Canton		Became 88A in 1960.
86C	1960–1964	Hereford		Was 85C until 1960. Closed to steam 1964
86D	1949–1960	Llantrisant		Became 88G in 1960.
86E	1949–1968	Severn Tunnel Junction	ST	Closed to steam 1965
86F	1949–1960	Tondu; Sub-shed Bridgend (1950)		Became 88H in 1960.
86F	1960–1964	Aberbeeg		Was 86H until 1960. Closed to steam 1964
86G	1949–1967	Pontypool Road; Sub-sheds Abergavenny (1954–1958), Branches Fork (to 1952), Pontrilas (to 1953)		Closed to steam 1965
86H	1949–1961	Aberbeeg		Became 86F in 1960.
86J	1949–1961	Aberdare		Became 88J in 1960.
86K	1950–1954	Abergavenny; Sub-shed Tredegar		
86K	1954–1960	Tredegar		
87 Neath / Swansea
87A	1949–1965	Neath, Court Sart; Sub-sheds Glyn Neath (to 1964), Neath, Bridge Street (to 1964)		Closed to steam 1965
87A	1969–1973	Swansea, Landore	LE	Previously 87E
87B	1949–1964	Port Talbot, Duffryn Yard		Closed to steam 1964
87B	1964–1973	Margam	MG	
87C	1949–1964	Swansea, Danygraig		Closed to steam 1960
87D	1949–1964	Swansea, East Dock; Sub-sheds Gurnos (1959–1962), Upper Bank (1959–1962)		Closed to steam 1964
87E	1949–1969	Swansea, Landore	LE	Became 87A by 16 October 1971. Closed to steam 1961
87F	1949–1965	Llanelly; Sub-sheds Burry Port (to 1962), Llandovery (1959–1964), Pantyffynon (to 1964)		Closed to steam 1965
87G	1949–1964	Carmarthen; Sub-shed Newcastle Emlyn (to 1952)		Closed to steam 1964
87H	1949–1963	Neyland; Sub-sheds Cardigan (to 1962), Milford Haven (to 1962), Pembroke Dock, Whitland		Closed to steam 1963
87H	1963–1969	Whitland		Became 87H on closure of Neyland shed in September 1963. Closed to steam December 1963
87J	1949–1963	Fishguard Goodwick		Closed to steam 1963
87K	1950–1959	Swansea, Victoria; Sub-sheds Gurnos, Llandovery, Upper Bank (1950–1957)		
88 Cardiff
88A	1950–1957	Cardiff (Cathays); Sub-shed Radyr		
88A	1957–1960	Radyr; Sub-shed Cardiff Cathays		Became 88B in 1960.
88A	1960–1962	Cardiff Canton; Sub-shed Cardiff East Dock (1961–1962)	CF	Was 86C until 1960. Closed to steam 1965. Became 86A in 1966.
88A	1963–1965	Cardiff East Dock		Was 88L until 1963.Closed to steam 1965
88B	1949–1958	Cardiff East Dock		Was a sub-shed of 88A(Cardiff Canton) from 1958 until it became 88L in 1962.
88B	1961–1962	Cardiff Cathays; Sub-shed Radyr		Was 88A until 1960. Closed to steam 1965 Became 88M in 1963.
88B	1962–1968	Radyr		
88C	1949–1964	Barry		Closed to steam 1964
88D	1949–1964	Merthyr Tydfil; Sub-sheds Dowlais Cae Harris, Dowlais Central (to 1960), Rhymney		Closed to steam 1964
88D	1964–1965	Rhymney		Previously a sub-shed of 88D Merthyr Tydfil. Closed to steam 1965
88E	1949–1964	Abercynon		Closed to steam 1964
88F	1949–1967	Treherbert; Sub-sheds Ferndale (to 1964), Pwllyrhebog (to 1951)		Closed to steam 1965
88G	1960–1964	Llantrisant		Was 86B until 1960. Closed to steam 1964
88H	1961–1964	Tondu		Was 86F until 1960. Closed to steam 1964
88J	1961–1965	Aberdare		Was 86J until 1960. Closed to steam 1965
88K	1961–1962	Brecon		Was 89B until 1961. The shed never received any allocation of locomotives as 88K and closed to steam 1962
88L	1962–1963	Cardiff East Dock		Previously 88B and then a sub-shed of 88A. Became 88A in 1963.
88M	1962–1964	Cardiff Cathays		Previously 88B
89 Oswestry (until 1963)
89A	1949–1960	Oswestry; Sub-sheds Llanfylin (to 1952), Llanidloes (to 1962), Moat Lane (to 1962)		Became 89D in 1960.
89A	1960–1963	Shrewsbury		Was 84G until 1960, became 6D in 1963.
89B	1949–1961	Brecon; Sub-shed Builth Wells (to 1957)		Became 88K in 1961.
89B	1960–1963	Croes Newydd		Was 84J until 1960, became 6C in 1963.
89C	1949–1963	Machynlleth; Sub-sheds Aberayron (to 1962), Aberystwyth, Aberystwyth VoR (to ?), Portmadoc, Pwllheli		Became 6F in 1963.
89D	1960–1963	Oswestry		Was 89A until 1960, became 6E in 1963.

== See also ==
- List of British Rail TOPS depot codes
- Steam locomotives of British Railways
