= Healey Mills Marshalling Yard =

Disused railway yard in West Yorkshire, England

Coordinates: 53.6649°N 1.5833°W

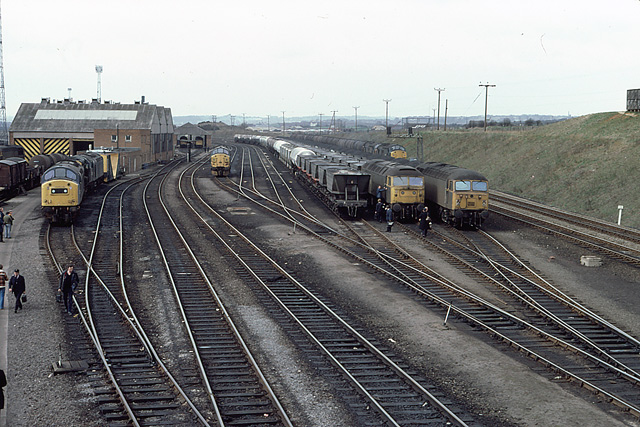
Healey Mills TMD and Yards

Healey Mills Marshalling Yard is a railway marshalling yard located in the village of Healey, south west of Ossett in West Yorkshire, England. The yard was opened in 1963 and replaced several smaller yards in the area. It was part of the British Transport Commission's Modernisation plan, and so was equipped with a hump to enable the efficient shunting and re-ordering of goods wagons. The yard lost its main reason for existence through the 1970s and 1980s when more trains on the British Rail system became block trains where their wagons required less, or more commonly, no shunting.

Facilities at the site were progressively run down until it closed completely in 2012. Six sidings were reopened in 2025.

== History ==
Construction on the yard started in 1959 and was completed four years later. Permission was sought from the National Coal Board to build the yard as it was built upon a profitable coal seam. The last coal was worked out in 1961 and stabilisation works were undertaken to enable the yard to be constructed. It was officially opened to traffic on 23 July 1963 by Lord Robens, who was chairman of the National Coal Board at the time. The yard had been conceived in the mid-1950s as part of the British Transport Commission's Modernisation Plan, which sought to rejuvenate the railways. Healey Mills was one of many hump yards being built, for whose traffic was planned in the 1950s, but by the time they were commissioned, lorries and fast motorways were eating into their ability to operate cost-effectively. Well into the 1970s, the traffic at Healey Mills was in excess of the 4,000 wagons per week that it was designed for; in one study week in 1966, over 16,500 wagons were sorted in the yard. Its location on an east–west axis meant that it was ideally positioned for the coal trains destined for either Lancashire, or the east coast ports of Hull, Immingham and Goole.

The new yard cost £3.75 million in 1963 (equivalent to £55 million in 2013), covered over 140 acres (57 ha) and stretched for 1.5 miles (2.4 km) alongside the railway and the River Calder. During construction, the site was flooded by the River Calder. In case of a re-occurrence of flooding, the control tower was built at 40 feet (12 m) above rail level. The yard was placed in the Healey Mills area near Ossett, and was located between the running lines of the existing Calder Valley railway. This involved the engineers having to widen the running lines in a bow formation and diverting the course of the River Calder. Four new bridges were built across the Calder and the relocation of the Ossett Sewage Works was necessary before the main construction could start.

The hump was installed at the west end of the yard so that traffic from the Yorkshire pits could be marshalled via a reversal over it, and then staged for delivery to either the east coast ports or Lancashire. It contained 120 sidings (covering 57 miles (92 km) of track), fourteen reception sidings over a semi-automated hump that led to 50 sorting sidings, and then a secondary yard with 25 sidings. The yard also had thirteen departure roads as well as fifteen staging sidings for block (trainload freight) trains.

Healey Mills, which was situated between Mirfield and Wakefield Kirkgate replaced several smaller yards in the Dewsbury/Wakefield area (namely Brighouse, Crofton Laden, Horbury Junction Sidings, Low Moor, Mirfield, Mytholmroyd, New Withams, Turners Lane and Wakefield Exchange). Three other yards, Copley Hill, Crofton Empty and Hillhouse, worked in a smaller capacity than before as some of their traffic was transferred to Healey Mills. When British Rail launched Speedlink (their air-braked wagonload network) in 1975, Healey Mills was one of twelve yards across the network where traffic could be swapped and interchanged. However, Speedlink was withdrawn from Healey Mills just ten years later in 1985.

A disused chord at Horbury to the east was used to stable the Royal Train on several occasions. In 1977, the Queen slept in the yard when the Royal Train was berthed overnight in the sidings.

In March 1982, a slow speed incident caused the derailment of some wagons on a freight train, one of which was a nuclear flask wagon. Questions were put to the Secretary of State for Transport, but as the derailment was at very low speed and no injuries occurred, there was no official post-accident investigation. The hump was closed in 1984 when average loads over it were 100 wagons per day, well below the 4,000 it was designed for. Much of the coal traffic that went through, or passed by the yard, was marshalled into merry-go-round (MGR) trains and so did not need shunting or marshalling. Coupled with this, the closure of Yorkshire coal mines in the 1980s meant that the traffic through the yard had dwindled.

By 1985, the yard could not be accessed directly from the west; the hump and reception sidings were closed and lifted. Traffic arriving from the Calder Valley or Standedge lines, would need to reverse in the departure sidings on the east end side of the yard. The sidings on the southern side of the yard were still important for re-staffing of locomotives, though by this time, the throughput at Healey Mills was as low as 18 trains per week due to a drastic cutback in coal operations.

Wagonload traffic still called, and was marshalled at Healey Mills, throughout the 1960s, 70s, and 80s, with it finally ceasing in 1985. However, it saw a small resurgence when the pre-privatised freight companies launched a wagonload service in the early 1990s. It lost its marshalling responsibilities again in May 1998, when Doncaster Belmont yard superseded Healey Mills as the gathering point and hub for Yorkshire. Doncaster Belmont's position on the East Coast Main Line meant that it was geographically and strategically better placed to handle the wagonload traffic (now branded as Enterprise under EWS ownership).

The signing on point for train crew was closed in February 2012 when it was transferred to some portacabins near Wakefield Kirkgate railway station. The depot buildings were demolished in 2016 and most of the track has been removed.

In February 2017, redundant carriages and track were used in a crash exercise using railway staff and the emergency services.

The site at Healey Mills was under consideration as a Rolling Stock Depot (RSD) for HS2 trains in the Yorkshire area; the proposed depot has been outlined at Gateway 45 in Leeds. As part of the TransPennine Route Upgrade (TRU), six new sidings were laid in the old yard area to act as a local distribution centre for materials needed in the upgrade of the line (sleepers, rail, ballast etc.). One of the sidings is 100 metres (330 ft) and five of them extend to 400 metres (1,300 ft). The new sidings became operational in May 2025.

== Depot ==
A depot was not built at the yard to accommodate steam trains, but in June 1966, one was built for diesel locomotives. It was the first built by the Eastern Region of British Rail that was not associated with, or had replaced, an existing steam shed, although it was coded 56B under Wakefield Shed. Steam trains had previously been supplied by Wakefield Shed (56A), which then closed in 1967. The last steam trains on British Rail were operating from Rose Grove depot in Lancashire in August 1968. This brought a daily steam locomotive hauled train from Rose Grove to Healey Mills. Diesel shunters operating in the yard before the diesel depot was built, had to run to Hammerton Street depot in Bradford for servicing.

Allocation of locomotives at Healey Mills numbered around 70 throughout the 1970s, but had risen slightly to 77 by 1982. This was composed of classes 03, 08, 37, 40, 47 and class 56, though the class 56 locomotives were only allocated to the depot for two years. Under TOPS, the depot code was HM.

Due to the loss of traffic and the closure of the hump yard, the depot was downgraded from a traction maintenance depot (TMD) into a traction servicing depot. It lost its allocation of mainline locomotives, which were shared between Gateshead, Immingham, March, Stratford, Tinsley and Thornaby, and its shunters were sent to Leeds Holbeck.

In 1993, Trainload Petroleum reopened the depot at Healey Mills, though this was short-lived, and was only used for fuelling and minor maintenance of locomotives.
