= Manningham engine shed =

- Interactive map of Manningham engine shed

Location
- Location: Manningham, Bradford, West Yorkshire
- Coordinates: 53.8096°N 1.7601°W
- OS grid: SE159349

Characteristics
- Type: Steam; Diesel; DMU

History
- Opened: 1872
- Closed: 29 April 1967
- Original: Leeds and Bradford Railway
- Pre-grouping: Midland Railway
- Post-grouping: London Midland Scottish Railway
- BR region: London Midland; North Eastern
- Former depot code: 29; 20E; 55F

Manningham Engine Shed (also known as Manningham Motive Power Depot) was a railway depot located in the Manningham suburb of Bradford in West Yorkshire, England. The depot was built to provide steam engines for services leaving Bradford Forster Square station (originally Market Street) and freight traffic from the Valley Road area of the city. It was also responsible for other sites at Keighley and Ilkley (known as sub-sheds) with Manningham itself being a sub-shed of Holbeck.

During its ownership by British Rail, diesel multiple units were based there along with diesel shunters. The shed was closed in 1967.

== History ==
The first railway to reach Bradford in 1846 extended westwards up the Aire Valley from Leeds before turning south at Shipley and running along the flat ground of Bradford Dale before terminating at what was Market Street station (now Bradford Forster Square). Whilst a depot was established next to Market Street station (being operational by September 1846), the main depot at Manningham was opened on an enlarged site in 1872 due to the previous site becoming too cramped for its increasing use.

Even though a 50-foot (15 m) turntable was installed at Manningham, a turntable was retained at Market Street (which itself was replaced by a hydraulic turntable in 1938). By 1938, a newer and longer turntable (60-foot (18 m)) had been installed at Manningham.

It was originally given the code of 29 under the Midland Railway, which was changed to 20E under the London Midland and Scottish Railway (LMS) in 1935, a code that British Railways (BR) kept in their system in 1950. Manningham had always been a sub-shed of Holbeck (which was coded either as 20A or 55A, with the A denoting that it was the main shed). Manningham moved to 55F (still as a sub-shed of Leeds Holbeck) in 1957 when the depot was transferred from the London Midland Region of British Rail to the North Eastern Region. Manningham itself had sub-sheds at Ilkley and Keighley, with Keighley being transferred away to Skipton in 1935. Keighley was returned to Manningham in 1959.

The depot at Manningham was immediately to the east of Manningham railway station and included a roundhouse with access/egress facing towards Bradford. There was also a four-road wooden shed which was demolished in the 1930s, but its lines and ash pits were retained.

In 1959, DMUs were allocated to the depot to work the local services out of Forster Square. A fuelling point for diesels was not installed immediately and the DMUs had to travel to Bradford's Hammerton Street depot on the east of the city via the Shipley and Windhill line to refuel until sufficient facilities were provided at Manningham.

== Allocations ==
In 1933, the allocation at the depot ran to 68 steam locomotives being drawn from Midland Railway types with a small selection of Lancashire and Yorkshire Railway engines (L&YR Class 5 and L&YR Class 27).

In 1950, the depot had 45 locomotives assigned to it drawn from various types including BR, LMS and Lancashire & Yorkshire. By 1955 it had 32 steam locomotives, 25 in 1959 and 21 by 1962, though this included 4 Class 08 diesel shunters. In November 1966, some 5 months before closure, the depot had three Class 03 shunters, five LMS Fairburn 2-6-4T steam locomotives and six LMS Ivatt Class 4 steam locomotives.

== Closure ==
The depot was closed at midnight on 29 April 1967, with most steam locomotives being transferred to the depot at Low Moor on the south side of Bradford. Steam was withdrawn from the Bradford area by 1 October of the same year. The DMUs had been transferred away to Bradford's Hammerton Street depot eight weeks before the closure of the depot.

The site of the depot is now covered with light industrial units.
