= Carlisle Upperby TMD =

Railway traction maintenance depot in Cumbria, UK

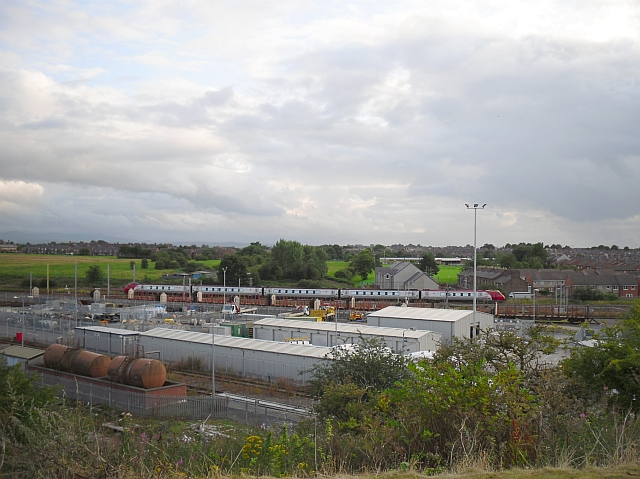
- A view across Upperby rail depot in August 2009
- Interactive map of Carlisle Upperby TMD

Location
- Location: Carlisle, United Kingdom
- Coordinates: 54.8818°N 2.9211°W
- OS grid: NY407544

Characteristics
- Owner: Locomotive Services Limited
- Depot code: 12B (1948-1950); 12A (1950-1958); 12B (1958-1968); Uncoded SP (1968-1973); CL (1973-)

Carlisle Upperby TMD is a railway traction maintenance depot situated in Carlisle, England. The depot was formerly owned by DB Cargo UK, and was reopened by Locomotive Services Limited in 2023. The depot was originally of service to steam locomotives (shed code 12A). The depot code is now CL. The old steam shed used to be known colloquially as "the Lanky", a reference to its origins as the main depot of the Lancaster and Carlisle railway.

== History ==
Constructed by the Lancaster and Carlisle Railway, the depot passed into London, Midland and Scottish Railway (LMS) ownership as part of the 1923 Grouping. The LMS rebuilt Upperby in 1948, replacing the original shed with a large concrete roundhouse. The LMS also constructed an enginemen's hostel on the hill adjacent to the depot (now the Hilltop Hotel).

In the 1960s, Upperby was allocated diesel locomotives including Sulzer Type 2 (later Class 25) and the unsuccessful Metro-Vic Co-Bo Type 2. However, once the new purpose-built diesel depot, Kingmoor TMD was completed, work was transferred there and Upperby closed as a locomotive depot on 1 January 1968. The roundhouse was demolished in 1979, but the remaining buildings continued in use as a carriage maintenance and servicing facility until closure in the early 1990s.

When British Rail was privatised in 1994–7, the disused depot became the property of EWS (now DB Cargo UK) as part of a nationwide portfolio of sites which also included the nearby Currock wagon repair depot.

== Present day ==
Upperby was closed in 1994 during the privatisation of British Rail. The carriage sheds were demolished in 2016 while the depot was under the ownership of DB Cargo UK. In September 2023, the depot was reopened by Locomotive Services Limited. It will be used as a third maintenance site for their fleet of locomotives. Part of the land formerly making up the site is now used by Network Rail for office space and storage of equipment.

The former carriage shed was demolished in December 2016.

== See also ==
- Carlisle Kingmoor TMD
