= Saltley railway station =

Disused railway station in Birmingham

Saltley
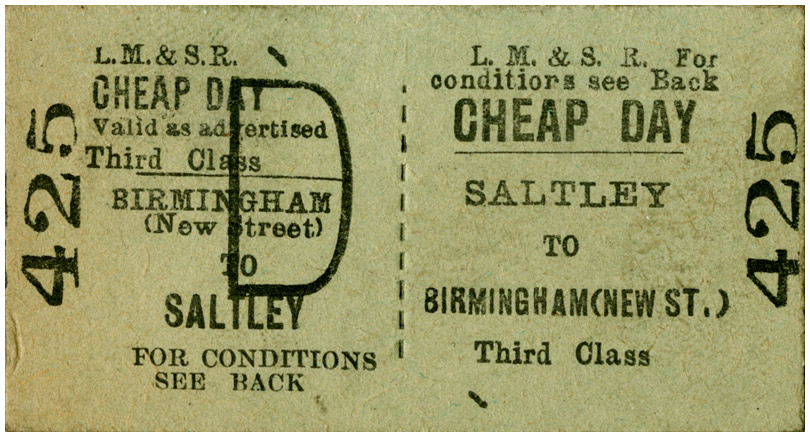
- 1930s ticket from Saltley to Birmingham New Street

General information
- Location: Saltley, Birmingham; England
- Coordinates: 52.4934°N 1.8641°W
- Grid reference: SP093883
- Platforms: 2

Other information
- Status: Disused

History
- Pre-grouping: Midland Railway
- Post-grouping: London, Midland and Scottish Railway

Key dates
- 1 October 1854: Opened
- 4 March 1968: Closed
Location

The newly built Saltley station on the 1855 New Survey of the Borough of Birmingham. Saltley Road is now Saltley Viaduct.

Saltley railway station was a railway station in Saltley, Birmingham, England, opened by the Midland Railway in 1854 and rebuilt in 1899.

Consisting of an island platform, it was on the line into Birmingham New Street from Water Orton. It closed to all traffic in 1968.

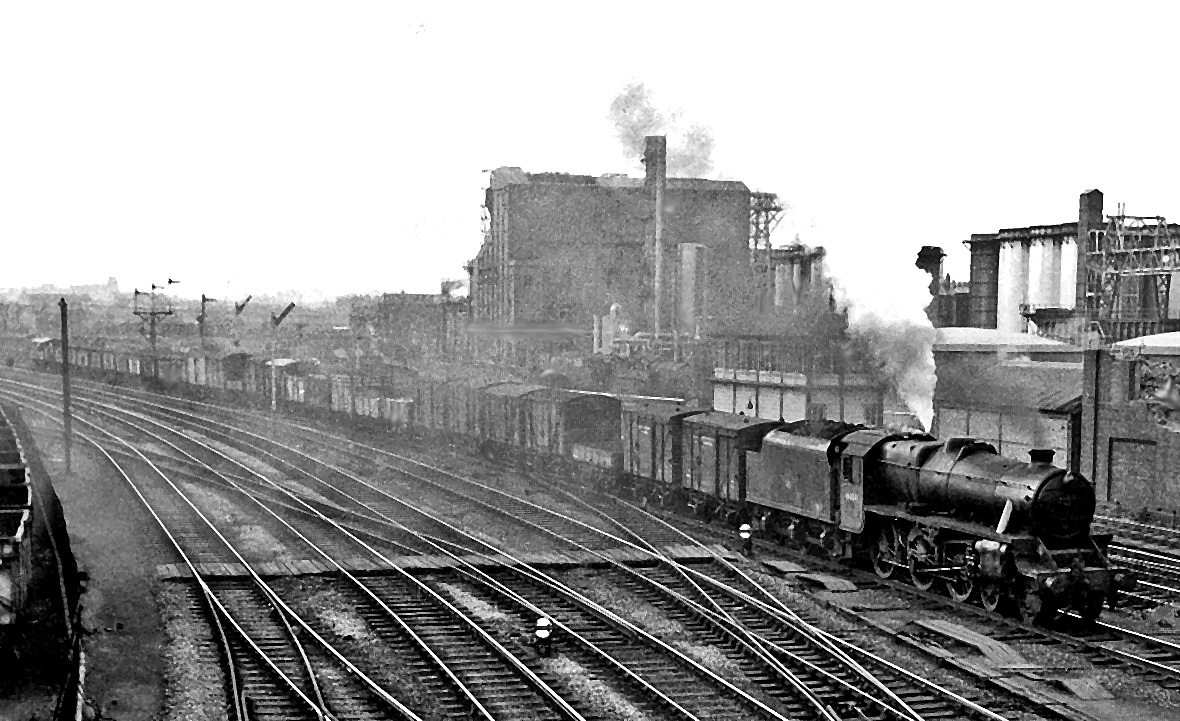
Up freight approaching Saltley in 1962

== Motive Power Depot ==
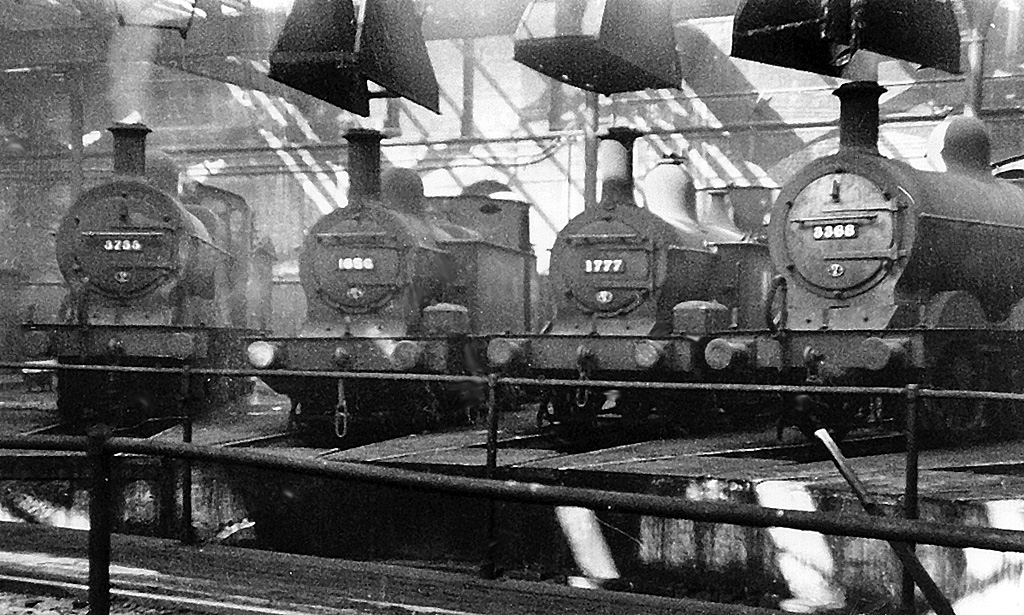
One of the roundhouses at Saltley in 1946

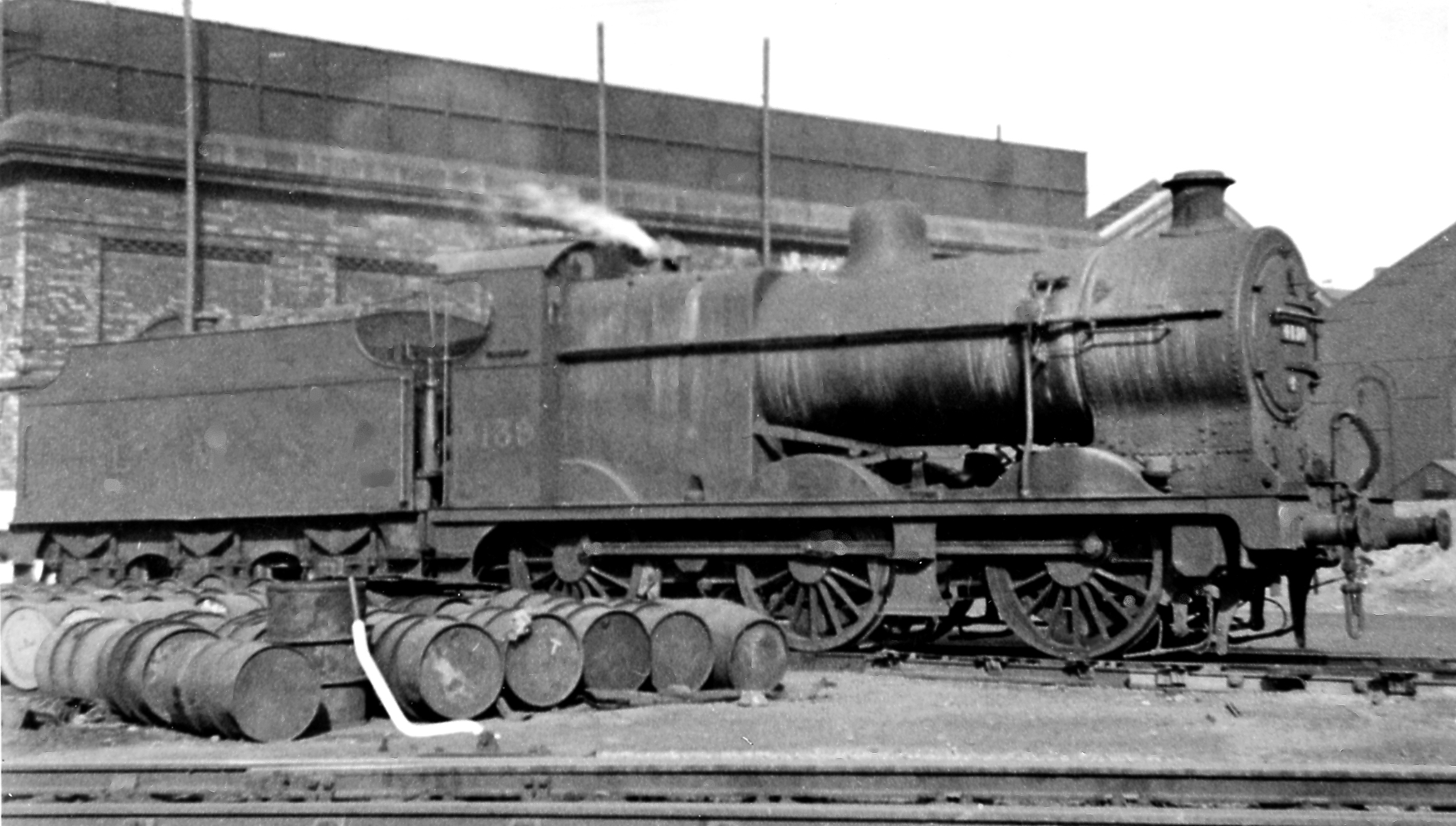
Class 4F outside one of the roundhouses at Saltley in 1946

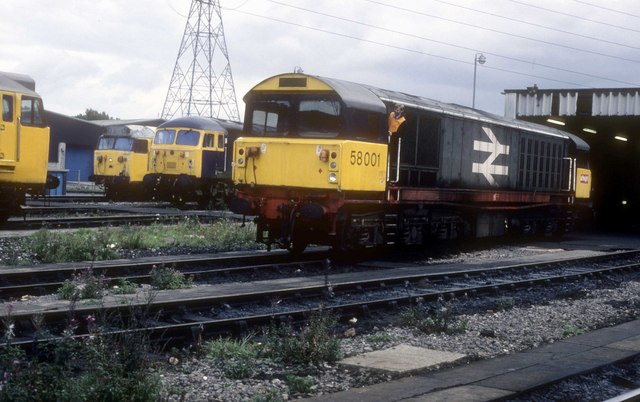
Saltley depot in 1984

Saltley station was the site of a large roundhouse motive power depot established by the Midland Railway in 1868. This was doubled in size in 1876, by the addition of a second roundhouse, and a third was added in 1900. The depot was re-roofed by British Railways in 1951, but closed on 6 March 1967 and was later demolished. The shed yard was used for stabling diesel locomotives until at least 1999. Under the London Midland and Scottish Railway and British Railways Saltley had the shed code 21A. As a diesel stabling depot it was SY.

Preceding station	Disused railways	Following station
Birmingham New Street	Midland Railway; Birmingham to Peterborough Line	Bromford Bridge
