= Canklow engine shed =

Disused railway maintenance depot in England

Canklow Engine Shed
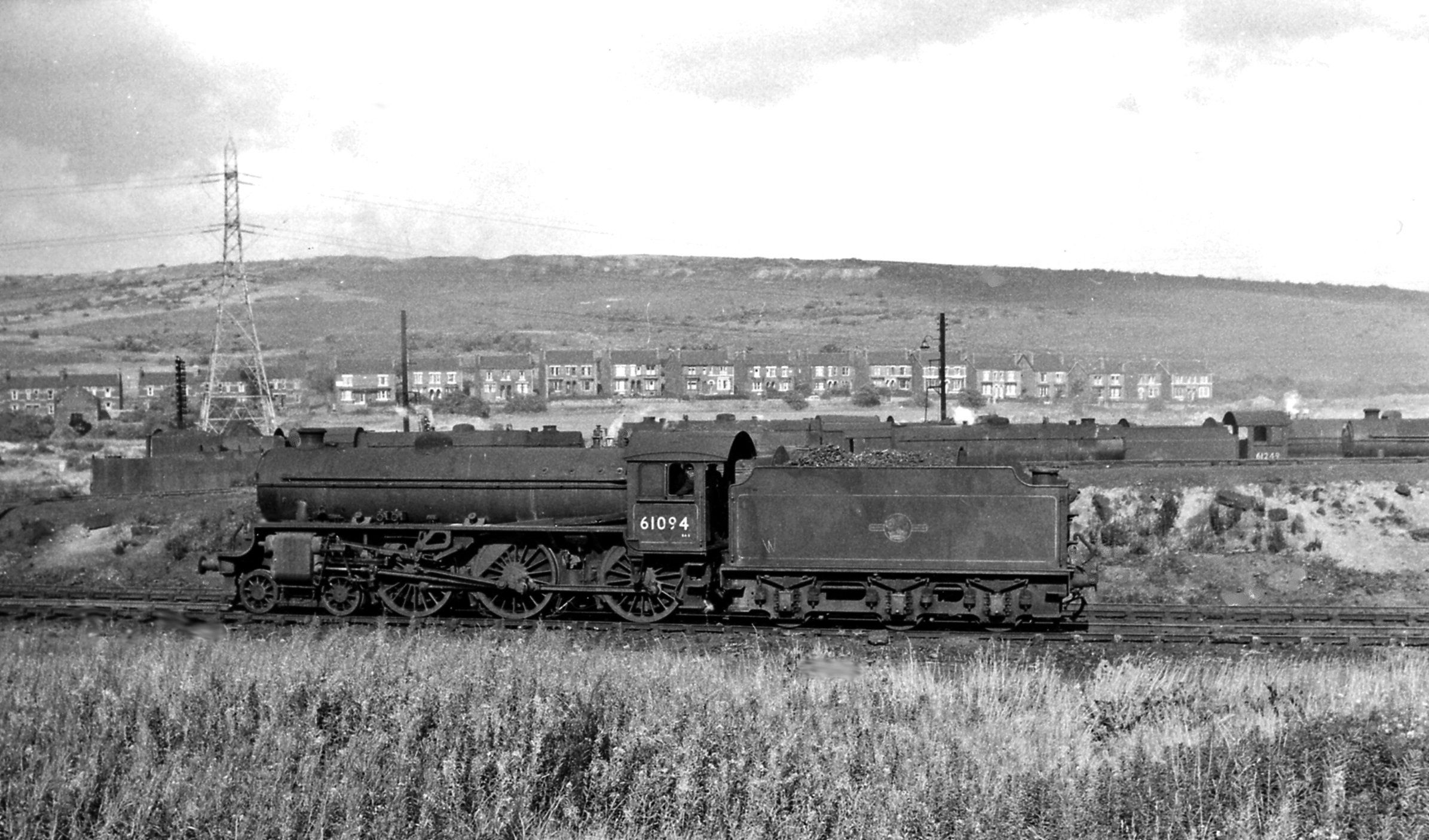
- LNER B1 4-6-0 passing Canklow Locomotive Depot
- Interactive map of Canklow Engine Shed

Location
- Location: Canklow, Rotherham
- Coordinates: 53.4038°N 1.3606°W
- OS grid: SK426898

Characteristics
- Owner: British Rail
- Type: Steam Locomotive

History
- Opened: 1900
- Closed: 11 October 1965
- Former depot code: 41D (1 February 1958 - 31 May 1965)

Canklow Engine Shed was a traction maintenance depot located in Canklow, Rotherham, England. The depot opened in 1900 and was situated on the Midland Main Line, 1.5 miles (2.4 km) south of Rotherham Masborough station. The depot area had six lines; three of these fed into just one line that went through the shed, whilst the other three were sidings, one of which had the coal stage.

The shed closed in 1965 following the opening of Tinsley Diesel Depot and was later demolished with a housing estate erected on the site in 1990.

== History ==
From 1963 to 1967, Class 25, 37 and 46 locomotives could be seen at the depot.

== See also ==
- List of British Railways shed codes
