= Camden motive power depot =

Motive power depot in London

Coordinates: 51.54185°N 0.15277°W

Camden Motive Power Depot was a railway motive power depot, close to Chalk Farm, Camden in London, England from 1837 until 1966, servicing express passenger locomotives using Euston Railway Station. It was closed following the electrification of the West Coast Main Line and largely demolished. However, part of the original facility has been preserved as The Roundhouse centre for the performing arts.

== History ==
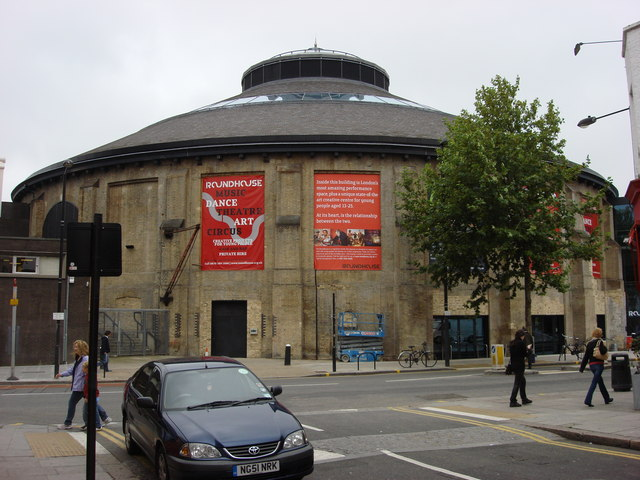
The 1847 roundhouse now used as an arts centre

The London and Birmingham Railway opened a locomotive servicing facility at Chalk Farm near to the present site in 1837, which was replaced in 1847 by two further buildings on either side of the West Coast Main Line. On the north side was a roundhouse intended for freight locomotives, and on the south side was a larger depot for passenger locomotives using Euston railway station. The roundhouse was closed in 1871 and replaced by the Willesden motive power depot. Its building was converted into a storage warehouse and in time became The Roundhouse centre for the performing arts.

The passenger depot was enlarged by the London and North Western Railway in 1920 and then rebuilt by the London Midland and Scottish Railway in 1932.

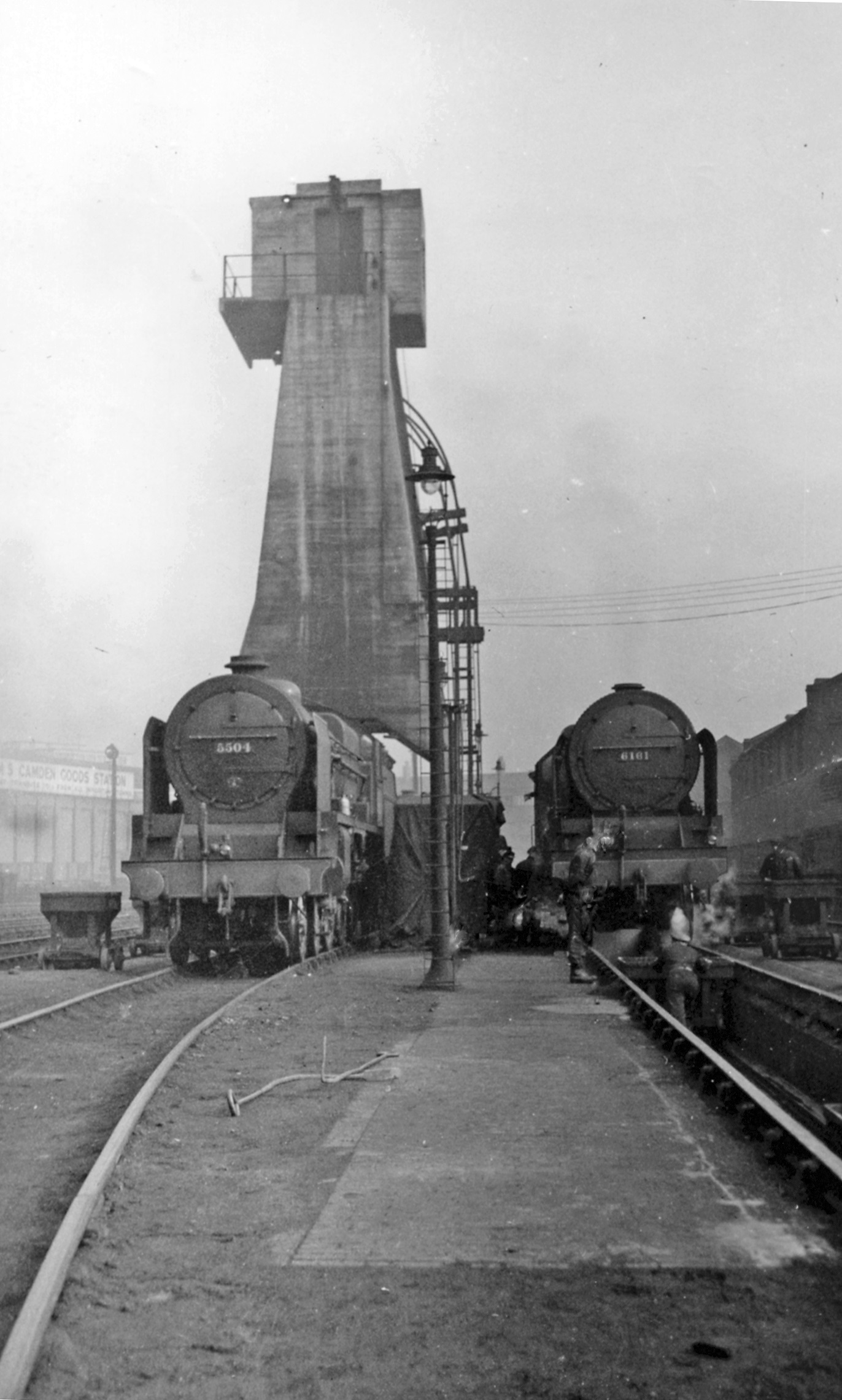
Camden motive power depot and coaling tower 1939

The Depot was closed to steam locomotives by British Railways in September 1963 and briefly used as a diesel depot until 1966, when it was demolished and replaced by sidings.

Under the LMSR and BR the depot had the shed code 1B.
