= Tinsley Motive Power Depot =

Railway depot near Sheffield, England

Tinsley TMD
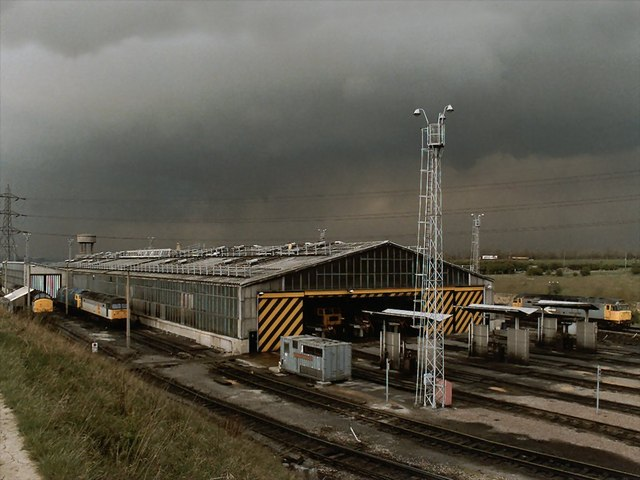
- Tinsley TMD in 1990
- Interactive map of Tinsley TMD

Location
- Location: Tinsley, South Yorkshire
- Coordinates: 53.3956°N 1.3765°W
- OS grid: SK415889

Characteristics
- Owner: British Rail
- Depot code: TI (1973 –)
- Type: Diesel

History
- Opened: April 1964
- Closed: 28 March 1998
- Former depot code: 41A (1964–1973)

Tinsley Motive Power Depot, latterly Tinsley Traction Maintenance Depot (TMD), was a railway depot in Tinsley, South Yorkshire, near Sheffield. Access by road was from Brinsworth, near Rotherham. The depot was situated on the freight line between Treeton Junction and the A631 Shepcote Lane.

== History ==
The depot was built as part of the Sheffield district rail rationalisation plan of the 1960s opening in April 1964 replacing Millhouses, Grimesthorpe, Darnall and Canklow steam sheds. It was situated adjacent to, but at a higher level than, the new Tinsley Marshalling Yard alongside the Sheffield District Railway.

Diesel locomotives had been stationed at the old steam shed at Grimesthorpe until the new facilities were completed and the locomotives were moved to their new home. The site also included a small electric locomotive servicing shed at the south end of the Secondary Yard, replacing the facilities at Darnall. Diesel railcars, which had been serviced at Darnall, were moved to a new servicing depot adjacent to the "Fish Dock" at the south end of Sheffield Midland station.

During the sectorisation period of British Rail, the depot came under the control of Railfreight Distribution (RFD). The sub-sector was responsible for non-trainload freight operations, as well as Freightliner and intermodal services.

In 1995, as a part of the reorganisation for privatisation, RFD was required to relinquish some of its Class 47s to Freightliner. The following year, EWS bought RFD, mostly for the lucrative Channel Tunnel operations.

Since the Class 47s were considered life expired by EWS management, and there were other depot facilities relatively close by (Toton, Bescot and Doncaster), and the other RFD locomotives were all electrics based at Crewe Electric TMD, the need for the Sheffield depot was deemed unnecessary.

On 28 March 1998 the shed closed and by March 1999 had been demolished.

The site of the sidings was reopened in 2021 as a terminal for intermodal freight services.

== Allocations ==
In October 1965 the allocation of motive power to Tinsley depot was as follows:

- Class 08: 74
- Class 13: 3
- Class 20: 12
- Class 25: 11
- Class 31: 57
- Class 37: 42
- Class 47: 73
- Class 44:

Around 1987, the depot's allocation included Classes 08, 20, 31, 37, 45 and 47. However, Class 56s and DMUs could also be seen stabled there.
