= Carlisle Kingmoor TMD =

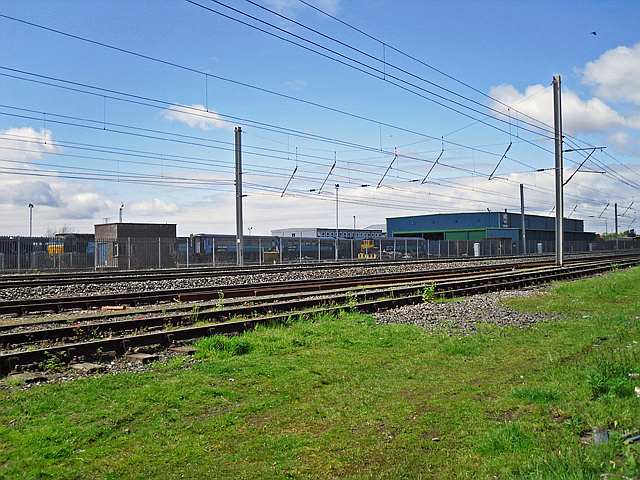
- DRS Kingmoor Depot
- Interactive map of Carlisle Kingmoor TMD

Location
- Location: Carlisle, United Kingdom
- Coordinates: 54.9086°N 2.9602°W
- OS grid: NY384575

Characteristics
- Owner: DRS
- Depot code: 68A (1948-1958); 12A (1958-1973); KM (1973-1975); KD (1975-2000); KM (2000-)
- Type: Diesel, DMU

History
- Opened: 1968; 1998
- Closed: 1987 (temporary)
- Original: British Railways

Carlisle Kingmoor TMD is a railway traction maintenance depot situated in Carlisle, England. The depot is operated by the Direct Rail Services (DRS). The depot was originally used to service diesel locomotives and diesel multiple units. The current depot code is KM. The original steam shed was called Carlisle (Kingmoor) and its shed code was originally 68A and later 12A.

The current depot is located on the opposite side of the West Coast Main Line to the original steam shed and was officially opened on 1 January 1968. Under British Rail control, the depot closed in 1987 and lay derelict until 1998 when the site was taken over by DRS. Since then a number of developments have taken place with the installation of a sand tower and increased office space.

Kingmoor marshalling yard is situated immediately to the north of the site.

== Allocations ==
DRS has a large number of its fleet at Kingmoor.

Class	Image	Type
Class 37		Diesel Locomotive
Class 57		Diesel Locomotive
Class 88		Electric Locomotive

== See also ==
- Carlisle Upperby TMD
