= Trafford Park TMD =

Engine shed in England

Coordinates: 53.4637°N 2.2973°W

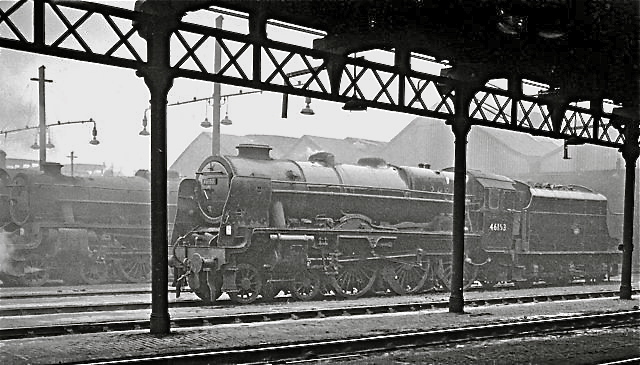
View inside the Shed, with Rebuilt 'Royal Scot' 7P 4-6-0 No. 46153 'The Royal Dragoon' waiting outside to go to Manchester Central to work an express to London St Pancras

Trafford Park engine shed was in Manchester (England), on a 3/4 x 1/4 mile site at OS Map Ref: SJ80379632 west of Manchester United football ground, set well back from the Manchester-Liverpool main line of the Cheshire Lines Committee just to the north of what is now the Trafford Park terminal of Freightliner Limited.

== History ==
It was built under the Cheshire Lines Bill 1893, was opened in March 1895 and closed on 4 March 1968. Each of the CLC constituent companies (Great Northern Railway, Manchester, Sheffield and Lincolnshire Railway and Midland Railway) had their own shed offices, though by the close one had been converted to a fitters shed and one had been bombed, as was much of Trafford Park.

It was built with 20 dead end roads, though later reduced. Hand operated points and semaphore signals, operated by Trafford Park junction signal box, remained until closure. Electric lighting replaced gas in 1958.

In 1960 the shed master said he employed about 350 staff, including 120 drivers, and used about 600 tons of coal a week from a hand-operated stage on the north side of the shed. In addition to the allocated steam fleet, he said he usually had 3 diesels stabled, plus any which had failed.

It mainly provided engines for passenger trains to London, Liverpool, Chester, Sheffield, Lymm, Fallowfield and Buxton.

Trafford Park engines had the shed code 9E (previously 13A (Note: a letter to The Railway Magazine suggests that the change in 1950 was due to superstition) coded 17F 1957–58). On 23 April 1960 it had 50 locos allocated to '9E':- LMS Stanier 2-6-2T 40009, 40018, 40088, 40141, 40208, LMS Fairburn 2-6-4T 42050, 42064, 42065, 42111, 42675, 42676, 42683, LMS Fowler 2-6-4T 42300, 42328, 42333, 42339, 42361, 42419, LMS 2-Cylindered Stanier 2-6-4T 42428, 42452, 42466, 42469, 42479, 42560, 42628, Midland Railway Johnson 0-6-0 43211, 43580, 43650, LMS Fowler Class 4F 44138, 44402, 44564-6, LMS Stanier Class 5 4-6-0 (Black 5) 44665, 44717, 44809, 45239, LMS Stanier Class 8F 48273, 48288, 48741, BR Standard Class 7 (Britannia) 70014, 15,17, 21, 32, 33, 42, BR Standard Class 4 2-6-0 76086, 88, 89. None has been preserved.

It closed with the end of steam on 4 March 1968.

== See also ==
List of British Railways shed codes
