= Neepsend engine shed =

Former British locomotive facility

Coordinates: 53°23′40″N 1°28′30″W

Neepsend engine shed was an engine shed in Neepsend, Sheffield, South Yorkshire, England. It was built by the Sheffield, Ashton-under-Lyne and Manchester Railway to provide and service locomotives for passenger trains originating or changing at Sheffield Victoria and goods trains from various outlets within the area. The shed was built around 400 yards on the Sheffield side (southeast) of Neepsend railway station. The shed was situated on the north side of the line between Bardwell Road and Rutland Road. It began as a four road stone building with a double pitched slate roof.

== Extensions ==
In 1850 the shed had the road nearest the main line extended through to give an alternative exit to the running lines, whilst the road furthest from the main lines could only be accessed from the turntable. This was also the engine repair road. By 1875 the shed had been doubled in length and the number of roads increased to 6. An extra bay was added to the north side, its design being such that it matched the original structure and a traverser to the rear give a route between the repair shop and roads 4–6.

== Turntable ==
Over the years the size of the turntable was increased from the original at around 32 feet diameter, to 43 ft 6ins in the late 1870s, ending with one of 59 ft 10ins diameter.

== Locomotives ==
The following type of engine were allocated to Neepsend:

- The Pollitt Class D5 (GCR Class 11) 4-4-0
- The Parker Class E2 (GCR 6D) 2-4-0

== Change of use ==
The shed was found to be inadequate for the work which was expected of it but nevertheless it survived until 1943 when the locomotives and staff moved to a new facility in Darnall. From this time Neepsend became a carriage and wagon repair facility. This work continued until 1963.

== Demolition ==
The building was demolished in 1965 leaving only the southernmost wall visible to window sill height, some coursing and the Bardwell Road wall with its bricked-up entrance way.
