= Radyr Motive Power Depot =

Former railway maintenance depot in Radyr, Cardiff

- Interactive map of Radyr Motive Power Depot

Location
- Location: Radyr, Cardiff
- Coordinates: 51.510589°N 3.242°W
- OS grid: ST139798

Characteristics
- Owner: British Rail
- Depot code: RR (1973 -)
- Type: Steam

History
- Opened: 1884
- Closed: 1965
- Former depot code: 88A (1 December 1957 - 9 September 1960) 88B (10 September 1960 - 5 May 1973)

Radyr Motive Power Depot was a traction maintenance depot located in Radyr, Cardiff, Wales. The depot was situated on the Merthyr Line and was near Radyr station.

The depot code is RR.

== History ==
Before its closure in 1965, the depot had an allocation of 0-4-2, 0-6-0, 0-6-2, 2-6-2, 2-8-2 and 4-6-0 steam locomotives.
