= Lincoln TMD =

Former railway maintenance depot in Lincoln, Lincolnshire

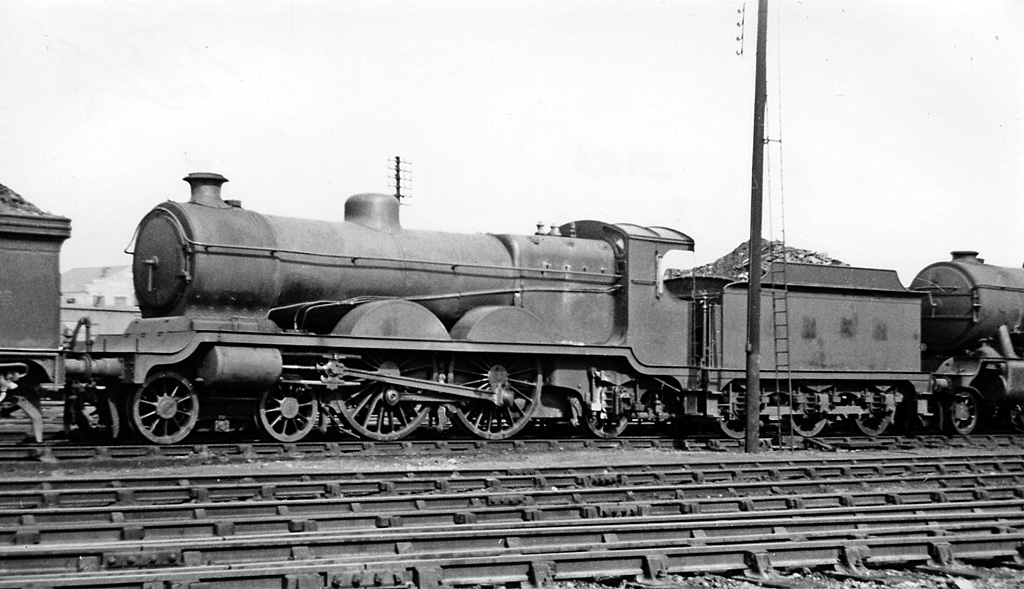
- Ex-Great Central Robinson Atlantic Class 8B or 'Jersey Lily' at Lincoln Locomotive Depot
- Interactive map of Lincoln TMD

Location
- Location: Lincoln, Lincolnshire
- Coordinates: 53.2251°N 0.5308°W
- OS grid: SK981707

Characteristics
- Owner: British Rail
- Depot code: LN (1973–198X)
- Type: DMU, Diesel

History
- Opened: 1875
- Closed: Late 1980s
- Former depot code: 40A (1 February 1950 - 5 May 1973)

Lincoln TMD was a traction maintenance depot located in Lincoln, Lincolnshire, England. The depot was situated on the south side of the Lincoln to Grimsby line and was to the east of Lincoln Central station.

The depot code is LN.

== History ==
Around 1987, the depot had an allocation of Classes 105 and 114 DMUs. During the 1980s, Classes 03, 08 and 31 locomotives could also be seen stabled at the depot. The depot was closed in the late 1980s.

== Bibliography ==
- Marsden, Colin J. (1987). BR Depots. Motive power recognition. Vol. 6. Ian Allan Ltd. ISBN 9780711017191. OCLC 18685680.
- Webster, Neil; Greengrass, Robert; Greaves, Simon (1987). British Rail Depot Directory. Metro Enterprises Ltd. ISBN 9780947773076. OCLC 20420397.
