= Cricklewood Depot =

Railway maintenance depot in Cricklewood, Greater London

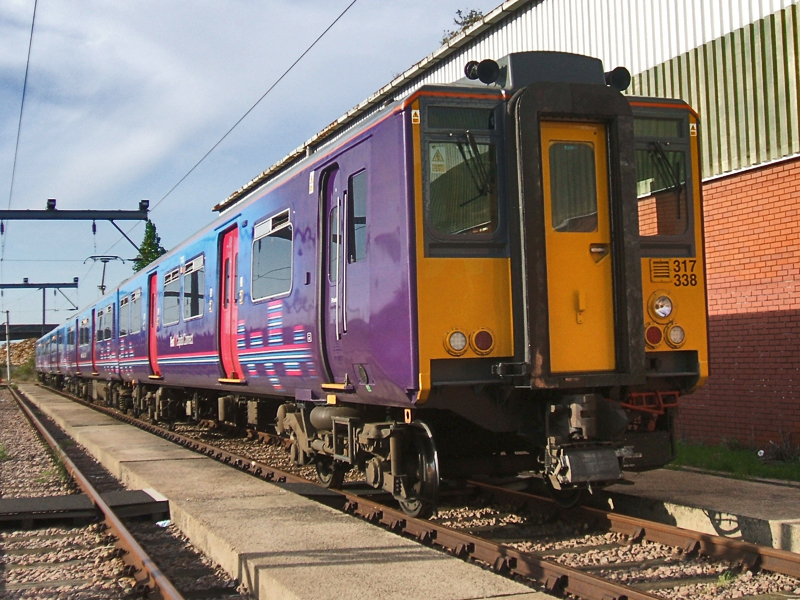
- A Class 317 in Cricklewood sidings
- Interactive map of Cricklewood Depot

Location
- Location: Cricklewood, Greater London
- Coordinates: 51.5684°N 0.2251°W
- OS grid: TQ231869

Characteristics
- Owner: Network Rail
- Depot code: CW (1973 -)
- Type: DMU, EMU

History
- Former depot code: 14A (1948 - May 1973)

Cricklewood sidings currently provides stabling for passenger trains, and is the site of a former steam shed and diesel traction maintenance depot located in Cricklewood, Greater London, England. It is situated beside the Midland Main Line, to the east of Cricklewood station.

The depot code was CW.

== Passenger train stabling ==
Trains berthing in the stabling roads between services are cleaned and have their water tanks refilled. Train types include East Midlands Railway Class 360s and Class 222 Meridians as well as Thameslink Class 700 EMUs.

== Domestic waste operations ==
The North London Waste Authority operated Hendon transfer station, which was located immediately behind the northern end of the site and accessed through the passenger sidings. Freightliner Heavy Haul hauled a waste container train, nicknamed "The Binliner" from here to a landfill site at Calvert in Buckinghamshire. The site last received binliner trains on 31 March 2021 and was handed back to Barnet Council on 13 December 2021. As of January 2025 is marked for demolition for the Brent cross town redevelopment, a new waste transfer station will be built on the other side of the midland mainline after the demolition works are complete, this new site will connect directly to the Dudding hill freight lines. Work has not started on this as of January 2025
