= Newport Ebbw Junction TMD =

Former railway maintenance depot in Ebbw Vale, Newport

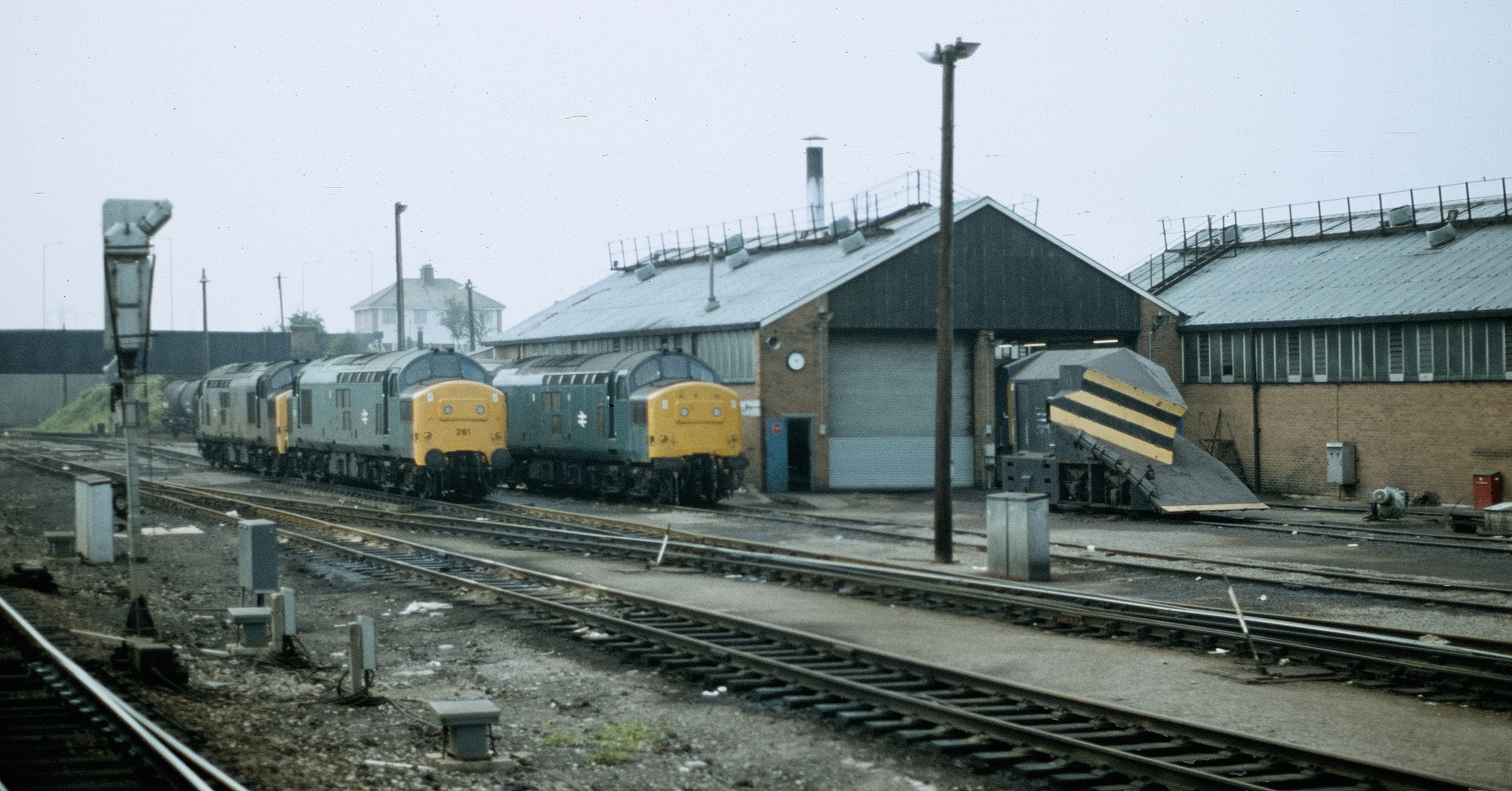
- Interactive map of Newport Ebbw Junction TMD

Location
- Location: Ebbw Vale, Newport
- Coordinates: 51.570°N 3.011°W
- OS grid: ST 30028616

Characteristics
- Owner: British Rail
- Depot code: EJ (1973 -)
- Type: Diesel

History
- Opened: July 1915
- Closed: October 1965
- Former depot code: 86A (1 February 1950 - 31 August 1963) 86B (1 September 1963 - 5 May 1973)

Newport Ebbw Junction TMD was a traction maintenance depot located in Newport, Wales. The depot was situated on the Ebbw Valley Railway and was near Newport railway station.

The depot code was EJ.

== History ==
Before its closure in 1965, Class 08 shunters and Class 25 and 53 locomotives could be seen at the depot.
