= Gloucester TMD =

Railway maintenance depot in Gloucester, Gloucestershire

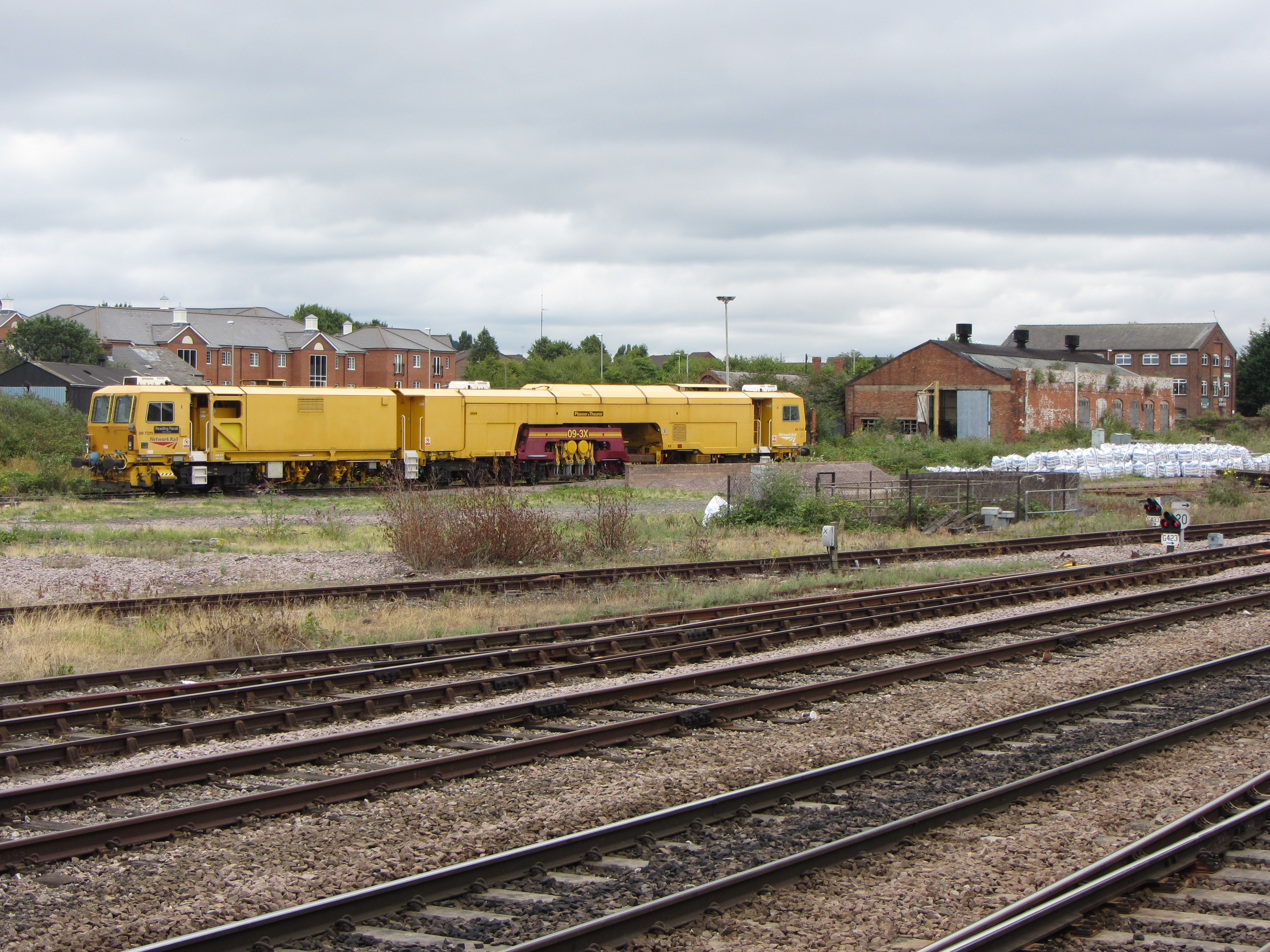
- A ballast tamper outside the depot in 2013
- Interactive map of Gloucester TMD

Location
- Location: Gloucester, Gloucestershire
- Coordinates: 51.8632°N 2.2305°W
- OS grid: SO842183

Characteristics
- Owner: Great Western Railway
- Depot code: GL (1973 -)
- Type: DMU

Gloucester TMD was a traction maintenance depot located in Gloucester, Gloucestershire, England. The depot is situated on the Great Western Main Line and is on the north side of the line to the east of Gloucester station.

The depot code is GL.

== History ==
Around 1987, the depot had an allocation of Class 08s and two Class 97 departmental shunters. The depot was also used for stabling Classes 31, 45, 47 and 50 locomotives.

== Present ==
As of 2016, the depot has no allocation. It is, instead, a stabling point for Great Western Railway Class 158 Sprinters.

== Bibliography ==
- Marsden, Colin J. (1987). BR Depots. Motive power recognition. Vol. 6. Ian Allan Ltd. ISBN 9780711017191. OCLC 18685680.
- Webster, Neil; Greengrass, Robert; Greaves, Simon (1987). British Rail Depot Directory. Metro Enterprises Ltd. ISBN 9780947773076. OCLC 20420397.
