= Colwick marshalling yard =

Railway yard in Nottinghamshire, England

Coordinates: 52°57′37″N 1°4′2″W

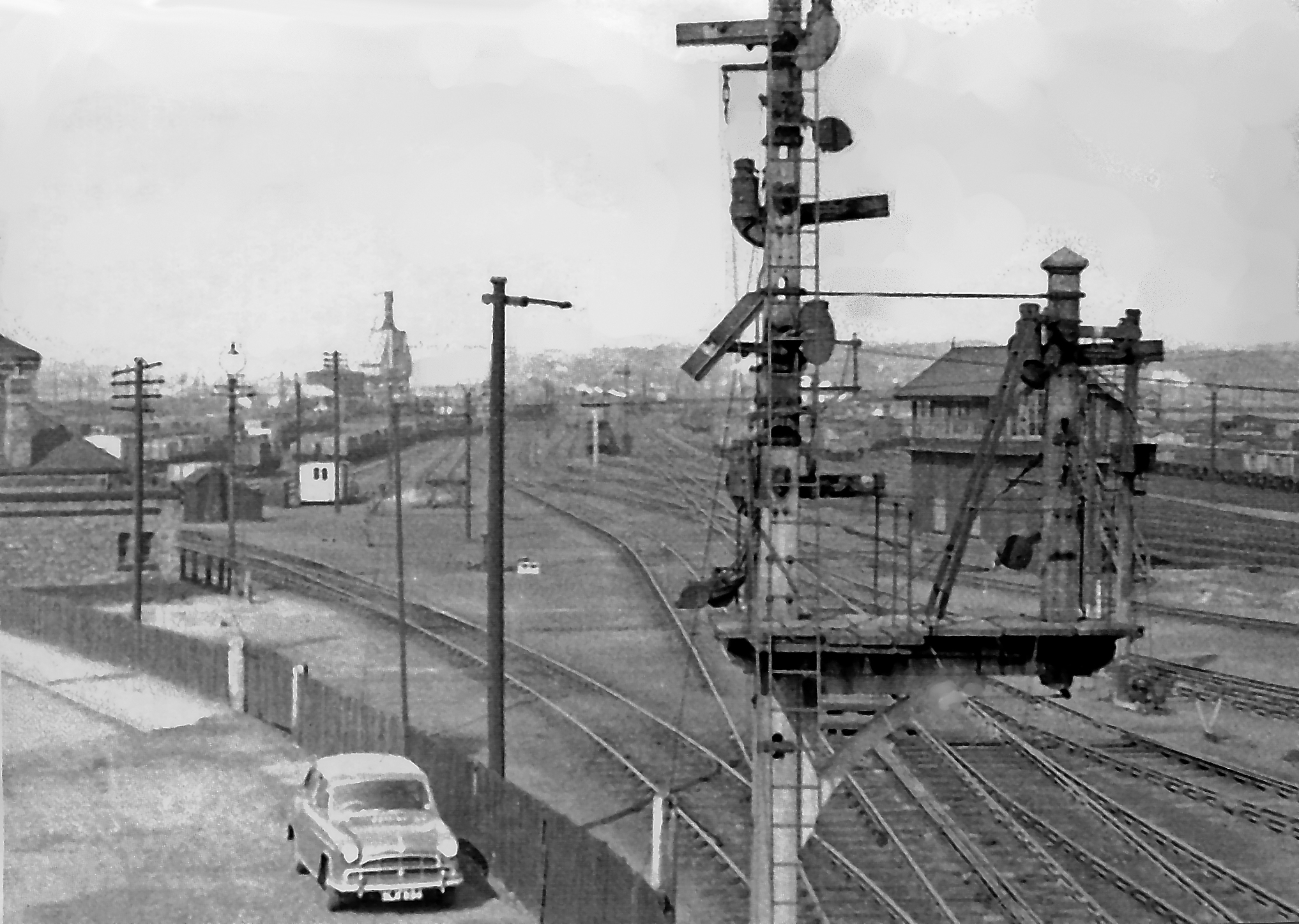
The western part of Colwick marshalling yard 1956

Colwick marshalling yard, also known as Colwick sidings, was a large railway marshalling yard in Netherfield, Nottingham designed for the concentration of coal traffic from the Nottinghamshire and Derbyshire Coalfield for transfer to other marshalling yards in London. It was built by the Great Northern Railway in the triangle formed by the Nottingham-Grantham line, and the Nottingham-Derby line, close to what would become Netherfield and Colwick station. It was built in stages from 1872 and was closed by British Railways in April 1970. The site has now been developed as the Victoria Retail Park.

== History ==
Until the 1870s the Midland Railway had a monopoly of the coal traffic from the Nottinghamshire and Derbyshire Coalfield. In 1852 the Great Northern Railway (GNR) main line had reached Grantham railway station where it met the Ambergate, Nottingham, Boston and Eastern Junction Railway. The GNR agreed with this company to operate its services thereby giving it access to Nottingham from London. Eventually in 1861 the GNR leased this line and began to develop freight its services from the coalfield in conjunction with its planned extension into Derbyshire and Staffordshire.

In 1870 the GNR purchased 150 acres (61 hectares) of land at Colwick to create a new marshalling yard, motive power depot, repair workshop and staff accommodation. By 1876 sidings for 1150 wagons were complete. The GNR line from Nottingham to Derbyshire and Staffordshire was opened in 1878 and the new marshalling yard was situated in the ensuing triangle of lines. By 1879 914,000 long tons (929,000 tonnes) of coal were being handled, and the continued growth necessitated further extension to the sidings in 1881. The completion of the GNR routes into the coalfield brought about further growth in 1890 and 1900.

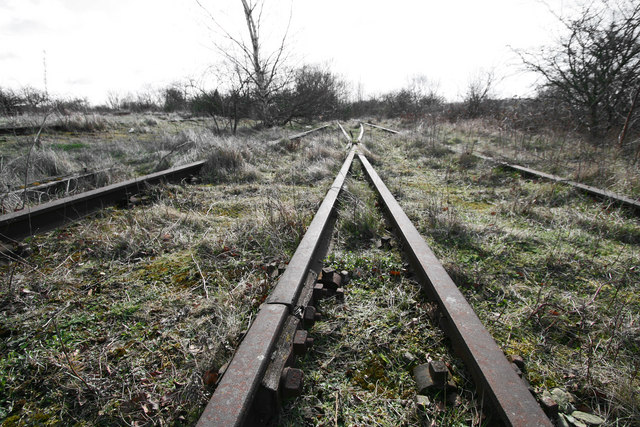
The remains of Colwick yard in 2008

Colwick was one of the largest marshalling yards of the London and North Eastern Railway (LNER) after 1923. The decline in its use of the facility began after the advent of British Railways (BR) in 1948. During the 1950s, the fortunes of the yard matched the decline in use of coal. In 1954 100,000 wagons were handled each month, but this had fallen to 90,000 by 1957 and 70,000 in 1959. The closure of Mapperley Tunnel after a rockfall in April 1960, further reduced the traffic using Colwick, so that barely 50,000 wagons were being handled by 1960. The yard was transferred to the London Midland Region of British Railways in 1966 and its remaining traffic was diverted to the nearby marshaling yards at Toton. The facility was almost entirely closed 12 April 1970 and is now the site of the Victoria Retail Park.

== Motive power depot ==
The first locomotive servicing depot at Colwick predates the marshalling yard and was opened by the Ambergate, Nottingham, Boston and Eastern Junction Railway in 1858. However, the GNR greatly extended the facility in line with the growth of the yard. Facilities included repair shops, coaling plant and a turntable. On 31 December 1922, when the GNR handed over to the LNER there were 231 locomotives allocated to Colwick (almost entirely heavy freight and suburban passenger locomotives). This number had declined to 197 by 31 December 1947 when BR took over. The depot was closed to steam in December 1966.
