= Grimesthorpe engine shed =

Coordinates: 53°24′07″N 1°26′08″W

Grimesthorpe engine shed was an engine shed in Grimesthorpe, Sheffield. It was built by the Midland Railway and opened in 1860 to serve the Midland Main Line. Up until 1935, Grimesthorpe shed code was 25, then changed to 19A by the London, Midland and Scottish Railway. Grimesthorpe gained the shed code of 41B after transfer to British Railways Eastern Region in 1958.

== Structure ==
The shed was built next to Grimesthorpe Junction, close to the site of the former Grimesthorpe Bridge railway station. The building was a brick roundhouse shed. An eight road fitting shop was added in 1898.

== Locomotives ==
Locomotive classes assigned to Grimesthorpe by the London Midland Region in 1952 included:

- LMS 4F 0-6-0
- Midland Railway 2F 0-6-0
- LMS 3F 0-6-0T
- Stanier 8F 2-8-0

== Closure ==
The shed officially closed on 11 September 1961, however it continued to be used to stable diesel locomotives for several years until Tinsley Marshalling Yard and its depot opened.
