= Darnall engine shed =

Disused railway maintenance depot in Darnall, Sheffield

Darnall DMU Depot
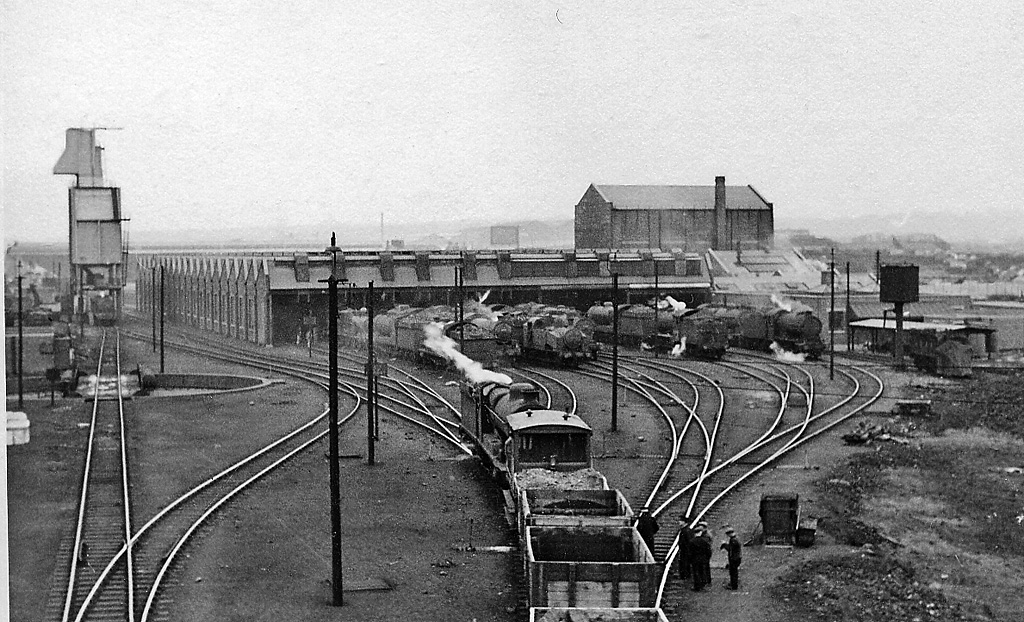
- Darnall Locomotive Depot
- Interactive map of Darnall DMU Depot

Location
- Location: Darnall, Sheffield
- Coordinates: 53°23′07″N 1°25′15″W
- OS grid: SK386877

Characteristics
- Owner: British Rail
- Depot code: DA (1973 -)
- Type: DMU

History
- Closed: 1965 (to steam); 1965 (to diesel)

Darnall DMU Depot was a traction maintenance depot in Darnall, Sheffield, England. It was built by the London and North Eastern Railway to serve the Sheffield area, passenger trains originating or changing at Sheffield Victoria and goods and pilot workings. The shed was built adjacent to the main line immediately west of Darnall station. British Railways initially allocated the shed code 39B to Darnall, and later 41A, both within the Eastern Region code sequence.

== History ==
Knowing that facilities at Neepsend were too cramped to operate efficiently the L.N.E.R. set about finding a suitable site for new facilities with easy access to their system in Sheffield. A site at Darnall was chosen and planning for the new engine shed commenced in 1936. Opening did not take place until 1943 with much machinery, due to wartime restrictions on new purchase, being brought from Neepsend. Photographs published in the "LNER Journal" showed the new facilities but, due to information restrictions at the time, it was captioned as being "somewhere in the north of England".

== Layout ==
The building was a 10 track straight through brick shed, with a large coaling plant and turntable. After the electrification of the local railways, an electric locomotive shed was also built and, in 1958, a 300-by-60-foot (91 by 18 m), 3-road, brick and glass diesel depot was added to service 60 new diesel multiple units.

== Closure ==
It closed on 4 October 1965 when Tinsley Marshalling Yard and its depot opened. The depot buildings were then used as a wagon-repair depot until the late 1980s.

== Locomotives ==
Locomotive classes allocated to Darnall in 1952 included:

- LNER Thompson Class B1
- LNER Class O4
- LNER Class J11
- LNER Class J39
- LNER Class N4 0-6-2T
