= Low Moor engine shed =

Former engine shed in Low Moor, West Yorkshire, England

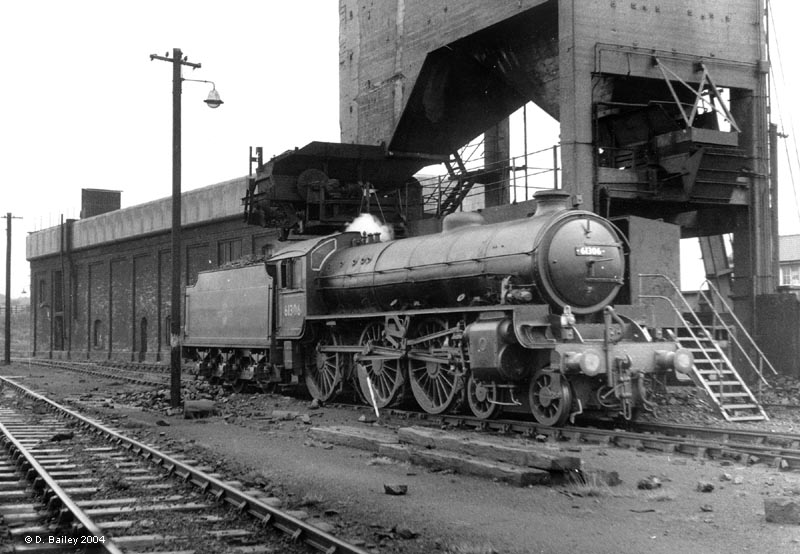
- 61306 by the coaling stage of Low Moor shed
- Interactive map of Low Moor engine shed

Location
- Location: Low Moor, West Yorkshire, England
- Coordinates: 53.7518°N 1.7499°W
- OS grid: SE165283

Characteristics
- Owner: Lancashire and Yorkshire Railway; London, Midland & Scottish Railway; British Railways
- Type: Steam locomotive

History
- Opened: 1866
- Closed: 2 October 1967
- Former depot code: 25F; 56F

Low Moor engine shed was steam locomotive shed built adjacent to Low Moor railway station, south of Bradford in West Yorkshire, England. Originally opened in 1866 by the Lancashire and Yorkshire Railway, the depot was rebuilt in 1890, 1945 and lastly in 1948 when it was under British Railways ownership. It was closed to all traffic in 1967, being one of the last steam sheds in the Leeds and Bradford area.

== History ==
The first depot to serve the needs of the Lancashire and Yorkshire Railway (LYR) in southern Bradford, was opened in 1850 near to the Drake Street (later Exchange) railway station. This was soon replaced by a new engine shed at Low Moor, which later become an important railway junction. Bradford was directly to the north, the Great Northern Railway's Bradford avoiding line via Dudley Hill (and the line to Wakefield) to the east, with Halifax to the south, and the Spen Valley Line to the south east.

The depot at Low Moor was opened by the LYR in 1866 and was located to the northern side of Low Moor railway station. This had replaced an earlier structure built in the 1860s which was nearer the tunnel mouth. (Note: Low Moor is 66 chains (4,400 ft; 1,300 m) south of Bowling Tunnel, on the direct line into Bradford Interchange railway station.) The engine shed was subject to alterations in size and structure in 1890 and 1945, by the LYR and London Midland and Scottish Railway respectively. During the First World War, many of the traditional male-orientated jobs were being undertaken by women due to most of the shed's able bodied men volunteering for war work.

In the 1940s, the shed had a turntable at the northern end, and twelve roads inside the shed, with access to the depot only from the northern end. By the 1960s, twelve roads still ran into the shed area, but the six most western lines had the overall roofing removed by then. As the drawdown of steam took place in the late 1960s, steam engines from the Leeds and Bradford area were sent to Low Moor as they were either supplanted by diesels or their steam depot closed down. Moving engines to Low Moor had been going on since the early 1960s; just before their withdrawal, the shed was allocated four Royal Scot 4-6-0s after they were no longer needed for Settle and Carlisle workings.

Originally, the depot had been designated as Shed No. 2 under the LYR. It was coded as 25F between 1948 and 1956, then 56F from 1956 until its closure. The 56X code determined that Low Moor was a sub-shed of 56A at Wakefield.

== Allocations ==
- 1933 - 65 steam engines
- 1950 - 37 steam engines
- 1955 - 31 steam engines
- 1962 - 50 steam engines
- 1966 - 14 steam engines
- 1967 - 12 steam engines

== Closure ==
Closure of the shed came in October 1967. Low Moor was the last surviving steam shed in the Bradford area. After closure, the site was earmarked for a Freightliner intermodal terminal, though this came to nothing, and all the lines were removed.
