= Bradford Hammerton Street Depot =

Disused railway maintenance depot in Bradford, West Yorkshire

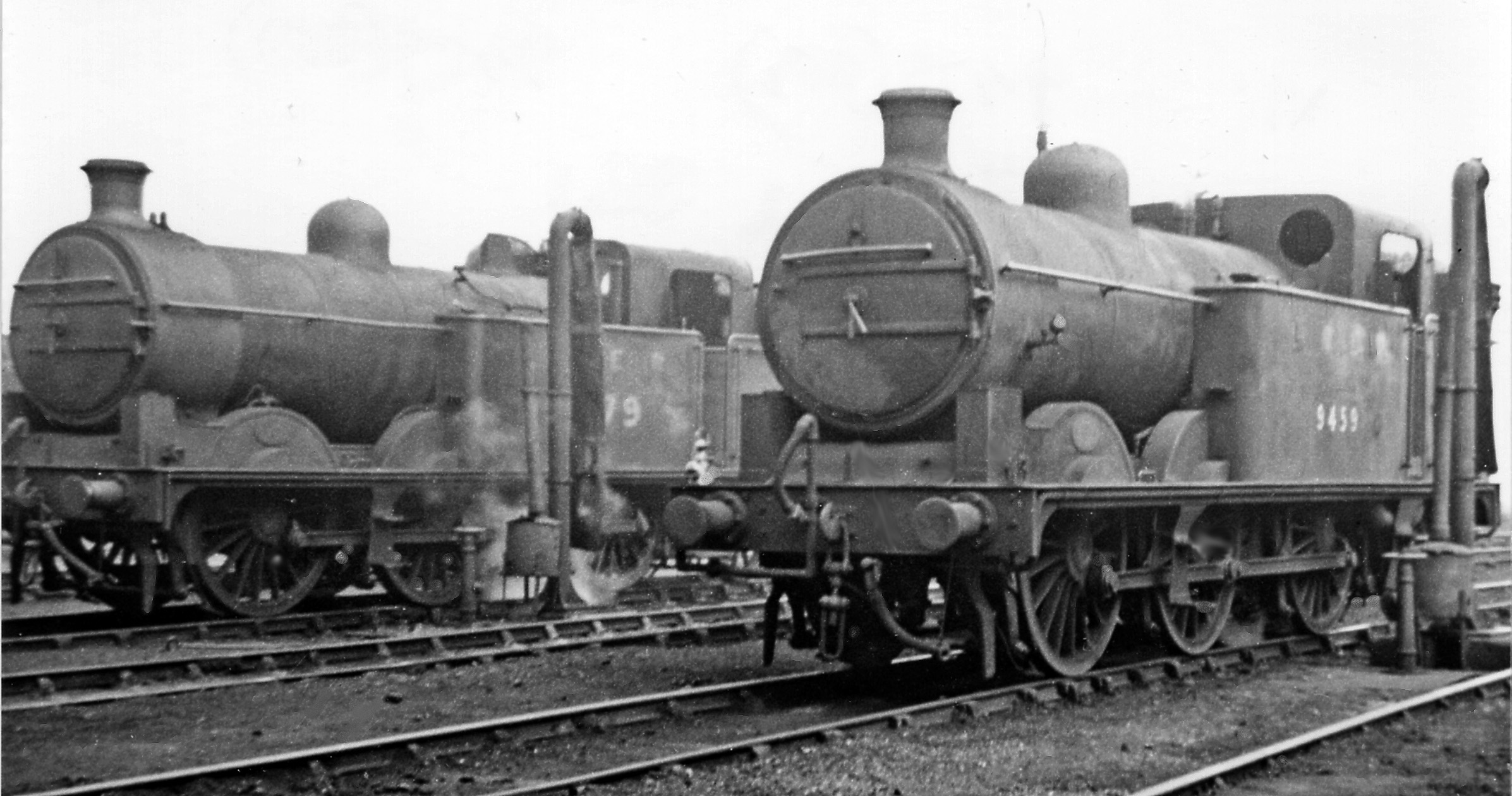
- Steam locomotives at the depot in 1947
- Interactive map of Bradford Hammerton Street Depot

Location
- Location: Bradford, West Yorkshire
- Coordinates: 53.7877°N 1.7373°W
- OS grid: SE174324

Characteristics
- Owner: British Rail
- Depot code: HS (1975–1984)
- Type: DMU, Diesel

History
- Opened: March 1883
- Closed: 1984
- Pre-grouping: GNR
- Post-grouping: LNER
- BR region: ER
- Former depot code: 37C (1 February 1950 – 30 June 1956) 56G (1 July 1956 – 30 November 1967) 55F (1 December 1967 – 5 May 1973)

Bradford Hammerton Street Depot was a traction maintenance depot located in Bradford, West Yorkshire, England. The depot was near Bradford Exchange station.

The depot code was HS.

== History ==
Before its closure in 1984, the depot had an allocation of steam engines until 1958, when it closed to steam engines so it could concentrate in diesel engines. After that, it had an allocation of Class 03, 04, 05, 08 and 20 locomotives as well as Class 104 and 110 DMUs. After its closure in 1984, these locos and DMUs were either sent to other depots or withdrawn. The site is now occupied by First Bradford as a bus depot.
