= Holbeck TMD =

Railway maintenance depot in Holbeck, Leeds

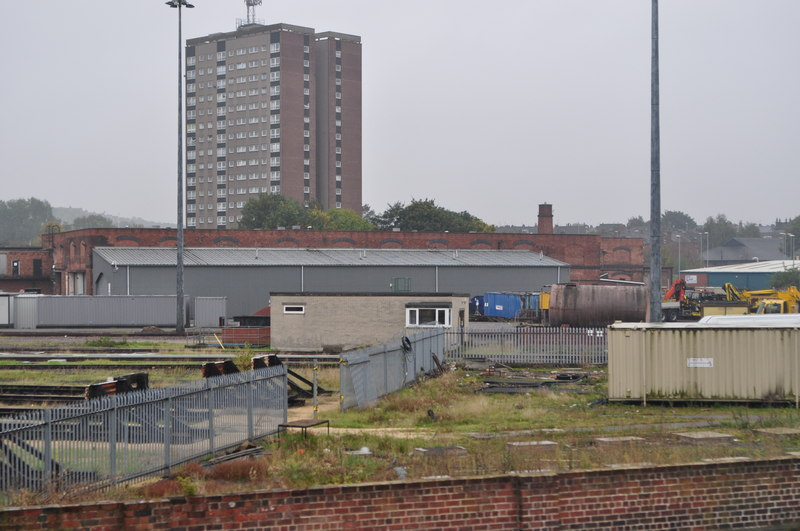
- Leeds Holbeck Engine Shed
- Interactive map of Holbeck TMD

Location
- Location: Holbeck, Leeds, England
- Coordinates: 53.7879°N 1.5563°W
- OS grid: SE292325

Characteristics
- Owner: RTS Infrastructure
- Depot code: HO (1973-)
- Type: DMU, Diesel

History
- Opened: May 1868
- Former depot code: 20A (1948-1957); 55A (1957-1973)

Holbeck TMD is a traction maintenance depot located in Holbeck, Leeds, England. The depot is located on the west side of the line from Woodlesford, and is 57 chains (1.1 km) south of Leeds railway station.

The site has been used to stable trains since the 1860s.

== History ==
Having housed steam locomotives since opening in May 1868, the introduction of diesels in the 1950s led to steam and diesel being serviced side by side. However, by 1977 a new two-road diesel maintenance facility had replaced the original brick sheds, so that in 1978 Holbeck was typically host to up to 20 diesel locomotives on weekdays, and up to 30 at weekends, and around this time locomotives allocated here were outstationed at Skipton as well as being used for duties around Leeds City station.

However, there were changes in the way that British Rail was working, so that the allocation from 1977 of 18 Class 47s, 39 Class 45s, 3 Class 31s and 11 Class 08 shunters had changed by 1985 when Holbeck had no allocated locomotives with Leeds being provided with shunters and HSTs allocated to Neville Hill located on the other side of Leeds City station.

Around 1987, Holbeck had an allocation of Class 08 shunters, and Classes 31, 45 and 47 could also usually be seen at the depot. By 1989, the depot had an allocation of ten Class 08 shunters, which, due to the downturn in freight operations in the area, were transferred away in February 1990.

The shed holds the unique distinction of being the last depot to have express locomotives on shed from the days of the Big Four, these being Ex-LMS Jubilee Class 4-6-0’s. The last of these locomotives, No. 45562 Alberta, was withdrawn on 4 November 1967.

== Present ==
The site is used by railway maintenance companies, and between 2018 and early 2020, all 16 Class 333 fleet were refurbished on site.
