= Heljan =

Danish model railway manufacturer

Coordinates: 55°28′35″N 10°15′53″E

Heljan A/S
- Type: Aktieselskab
- Industry: Model railways
- Founded: 1957; 69 years ago
- Headquarters: Søndersø, Denmark
- Key people: Niels Christian Nannestad, Founder; Jan Nannestad, Managing director
- Products: HO, 00 and O gauge Locomotives, Rolling Stock, Buildings and Accessories
- Website: www.heljan.dk

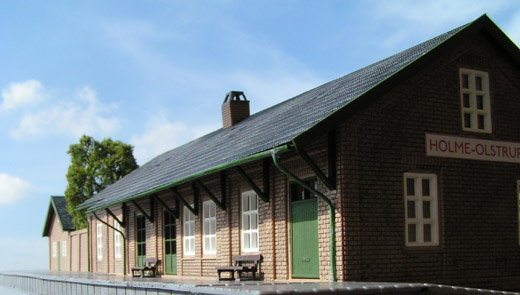
A Heljan H0 scale model of Holme Olstrup station in Denmark

Heljan A/S is a Danish model railway company based in Søndersø. Originally specialising in decorations and accessories for model railways, it has now also developed a substantial range of rolling stock. It has diversified into modelling the British scene, and since 2002 has released several OO gauge diesel locomotives, and several O gauge models. British Outline now forms the biggest part of the Heljan business and UK operations are run from Denmark through an agent. In line with other model train companies and to keep costs to a minimum models are manufactured in China. In March 2026 Heljan was acquired by fellow model railway company Accurascale.

== Range ==
Heljan's current UK OO gauge diesel loco range consists of British Rail Class 02s, 14s, 15s, 16s, 17s, 23s, 26s, 27s, 28s, 33s, 35s, 47s, 52s, Falcon, 57s, 58s, Lion and HS4000 Kestrel. The British Rail Class 86s are currently the only AC Electric outline models in the range. They have won praise for locomotive models in a wide variety of liveries. Several different models of the British Railways Waggon und Maschinenbau built Railbuses were released in February 2012. They also produce OO gauge British Rail Dogfish ballast wagons and Cargowaggon bogie freight vehicles.

Their UK O gauge range has consisted of British Rail Class 03 shunter, Class 20s, 24s, 25s, 26s, 27s, 31s, 33s, 35s, 37s, 40s, 42s, 45s, 47s, 50s, 52s, 58s, 60s, 73s, 117s, 121s, 122s, 128s 153s, and a Class 55 Deltic. The O gauge range also includes the Ruston 48DS shunter, plus British Railways Mark 1 and Mark 2 carriages in a number of liveries, and LMS inspection saloons. O gauge models are typically supplied un-numbered and with separate detailing parts, allowing the purchaser to finish the model to their own preference.

In the UK, a number of limited edition locomotives have been commissioned by model retailers. Heljan models of the British Rail Class 14 and Class 28 'Co-Bo' diesel locomotives as well as the LMS 2-6-0+0-6-2 Beyer-Garratt with twin motor design and working coal pusher are available through Hattons Model Railways. Several different models of the LNER EM1 and EM2 DC Electric locomotives constructed for use on the Woodhead Route are currently being produced for Olivia's Trains of Sheffield (terminus of the Woodhead line). A Midland Pullman is also planned. Several standard Heljan models have been produced in special, limited edition, liveries for particular retailers or UK railway modelling magazines.

Traditionally, Heljan has produced many Continental prototypes with H0 models such as the Swedish State Railways Class T21 and Danish State Railways class MY, MX, MO and P 4-4-2.

Highly acclaimed, working Turntable, Traverser and Container crane models are available in H0 scale and are also suitable for 00 operation. A number of plastic building kits are also produced in HO/OO, along with working street lighting.

In June 2022, Heljan announced plans to introduce a British Rail class 31 locomotive in TT:120 scale, with the possible production of a class 08 and a Hunslet Austerity 0-6-0ST locomotive. Previous commercial ready-to-run British outline rolling stock had, in the 1950s and 1960s, always been made to a scale of 1:100. The introduction of TT:120 scale rolling stock was coincidental with plans announced by PECO and Gaugemaster to produce products in what is a new scale for British outline models.

== Future plans ==
Planned models in OO gauge are a British Rail DP2.

In O Gauge a GWR AEC 'Razor Edge' Railcar and a Class 17 Clayton were released in 2021. It is hoped that these will mirror the huge success of the "Deltic" when it was released in 2011. Heljan had been considering the possibilities of producing a Class 14 "Teddy Bear" in O gauge but this was not thought to be viable due to lack of customer interest. (Produced by Minerva Model Railways in 2021)

== Gallery ==
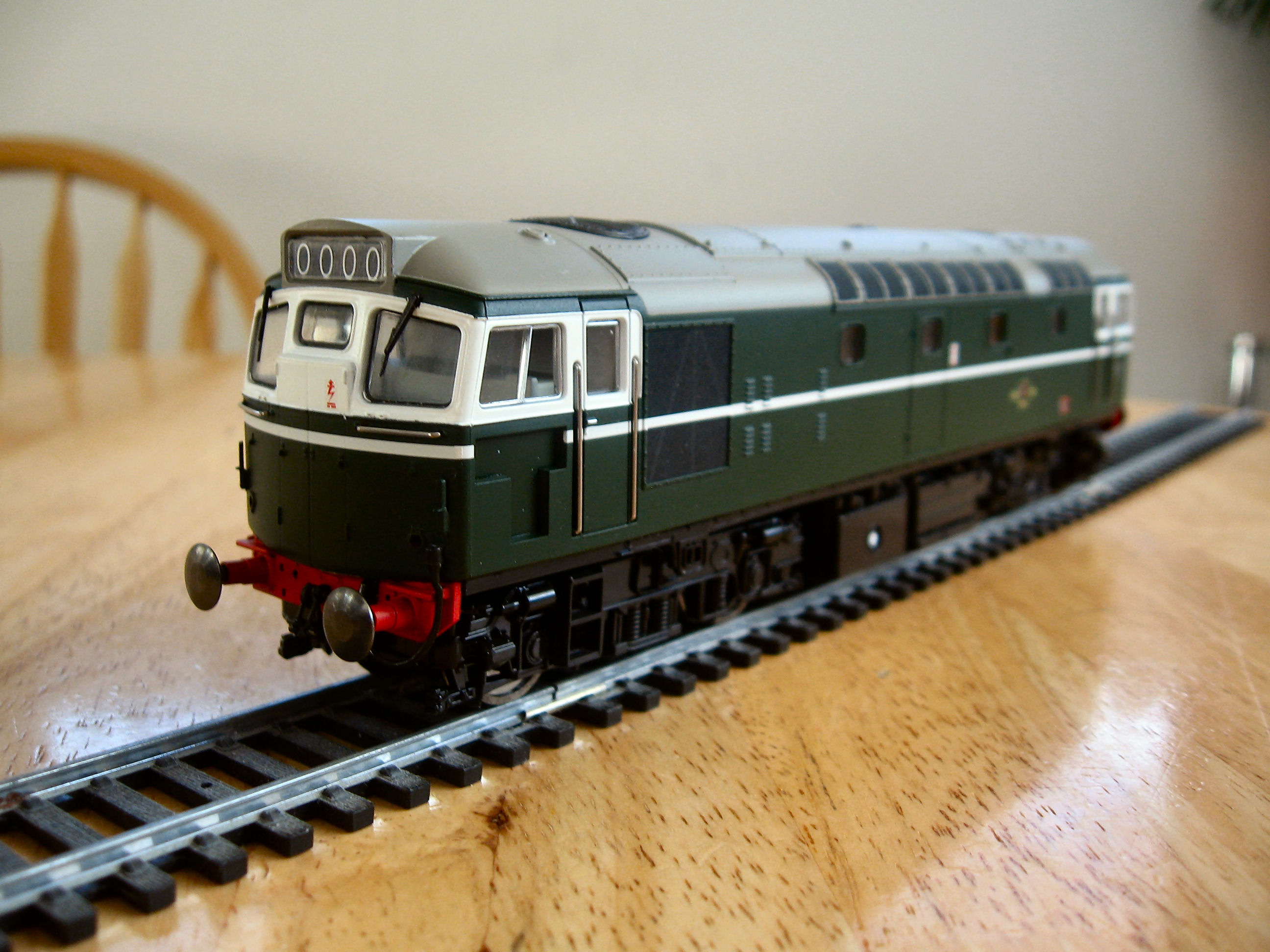
British Rail Class 27

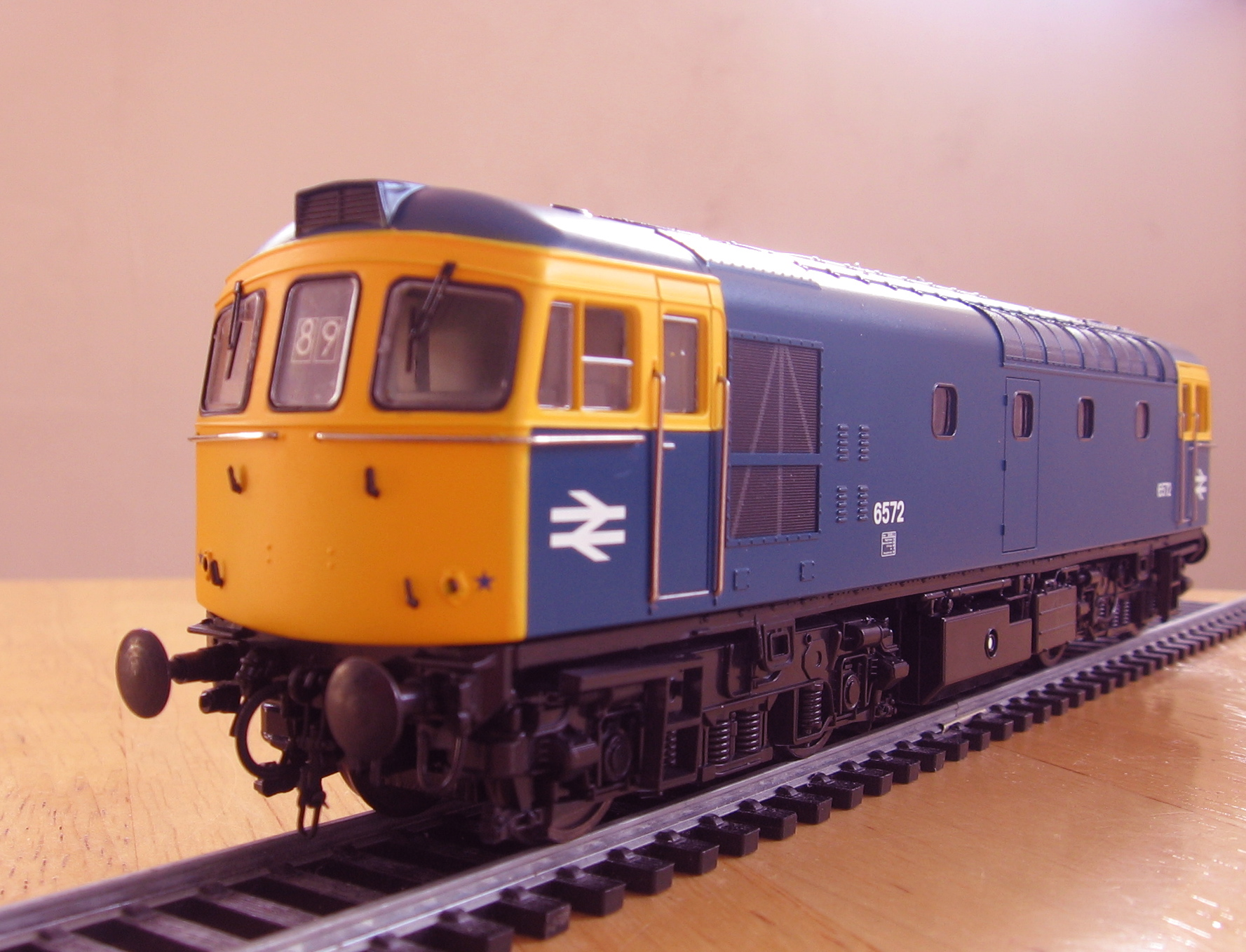
British Rail Class 33

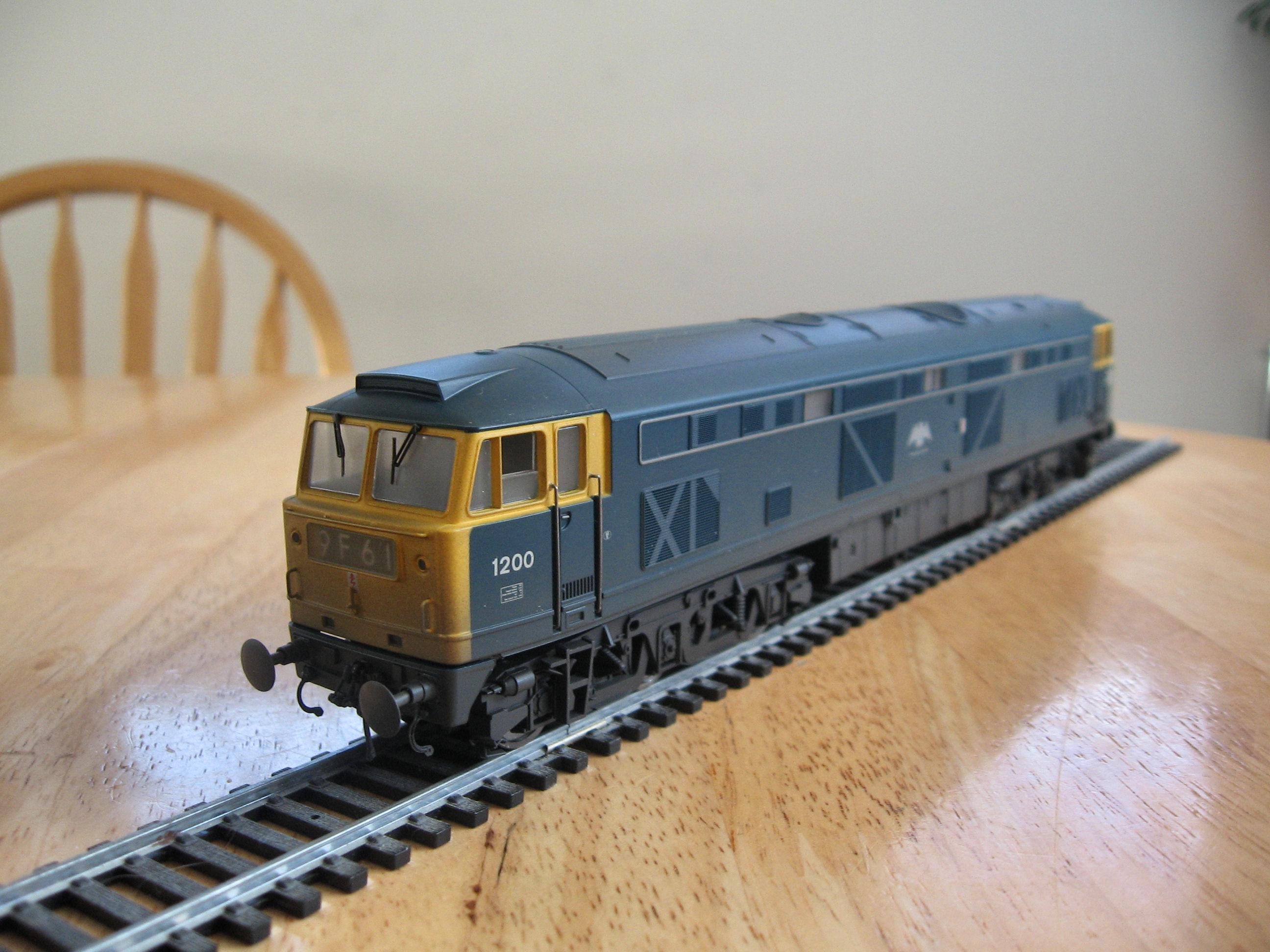
British Rail Class 53 Falcon

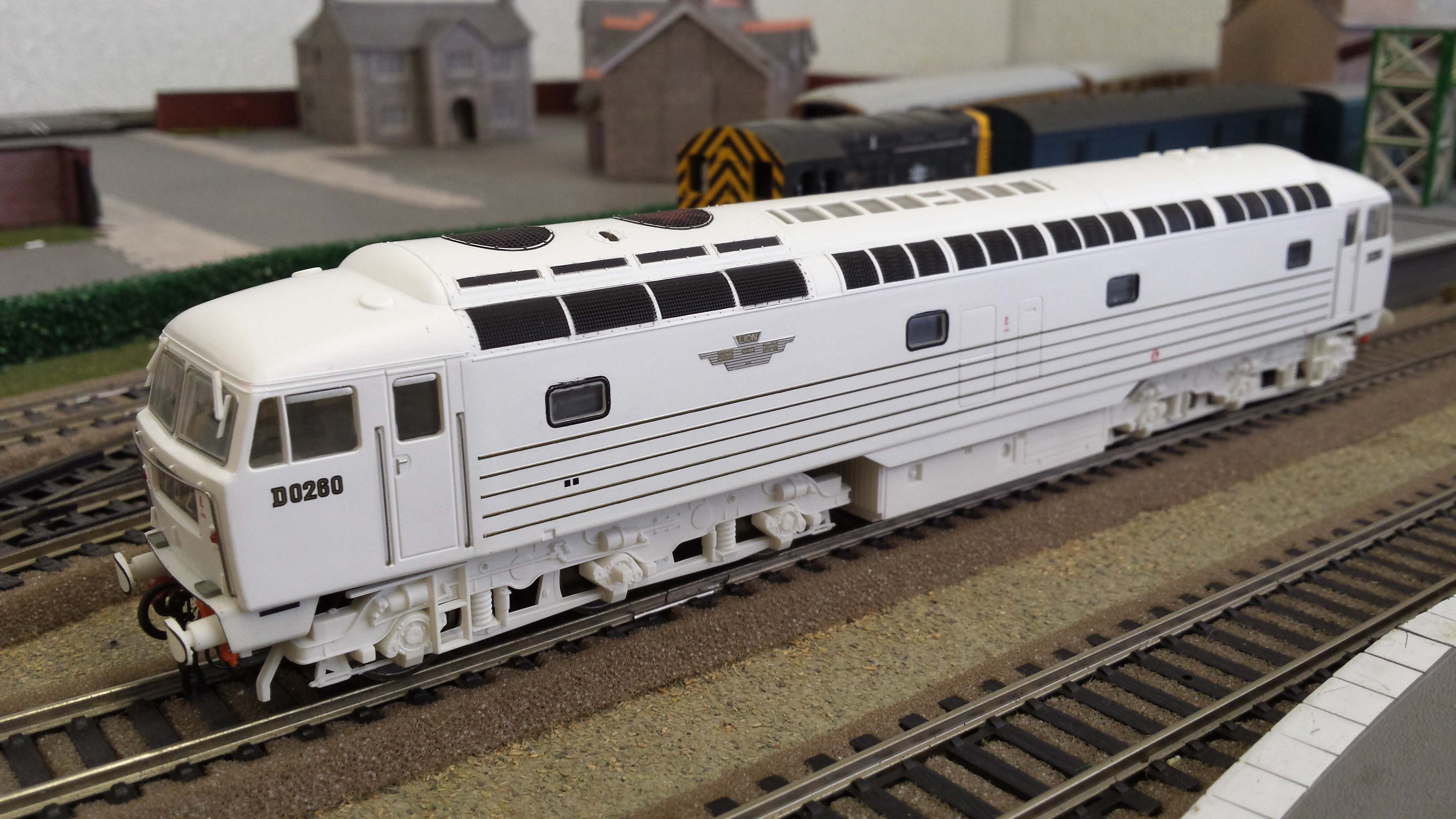
D0260 LION

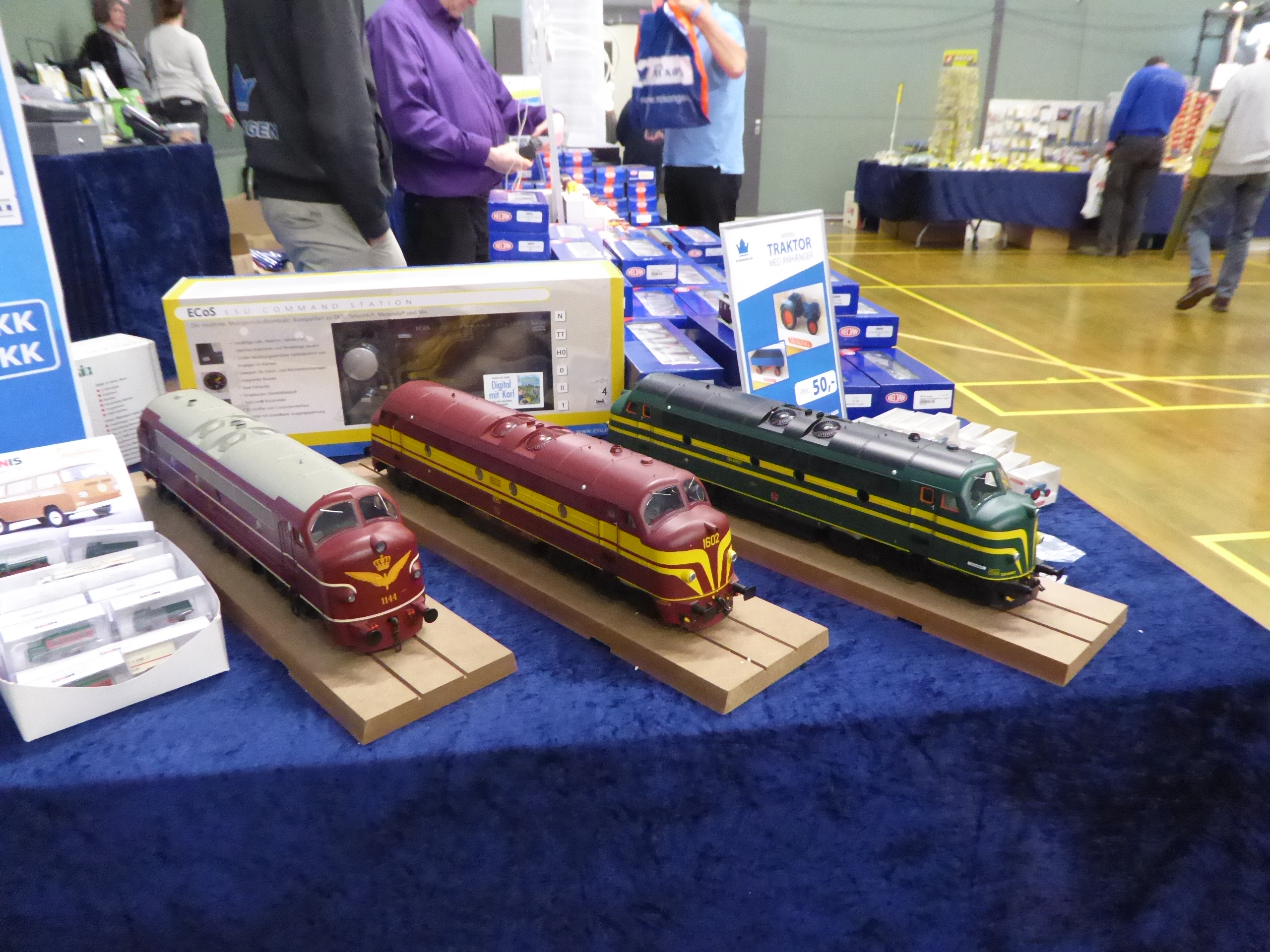
Heljan

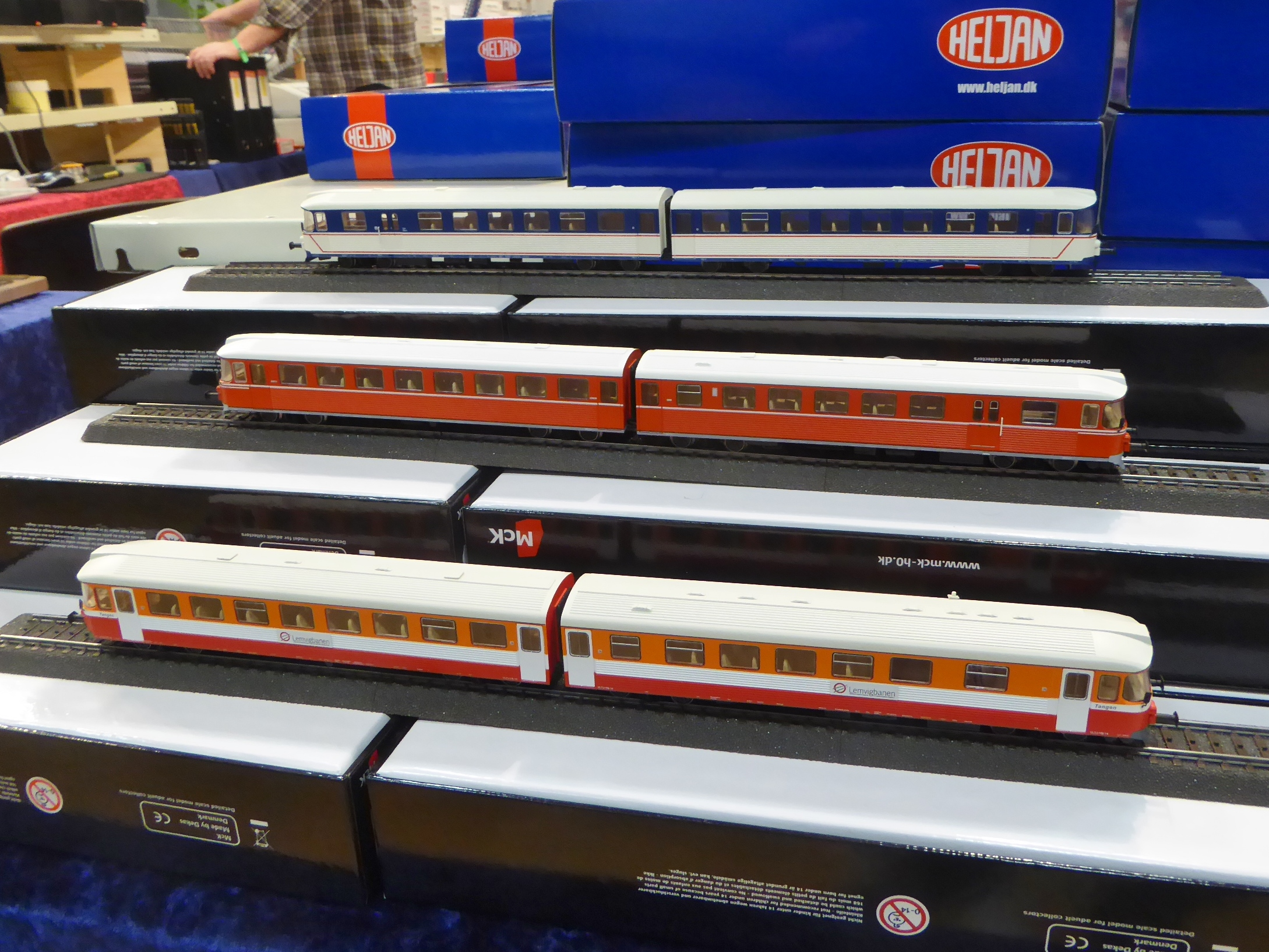
Y-tog
