= BRCW Type 2 =

BRCW Type 2 may refer to:

- British Rail Class 26
- British Rail Class 27
