= Birmingham Railway Carriage and Wagon Company =

Defunct British railway locomotive and carriage builder

Coordinates: 52°30′19″N 1°57′39″W

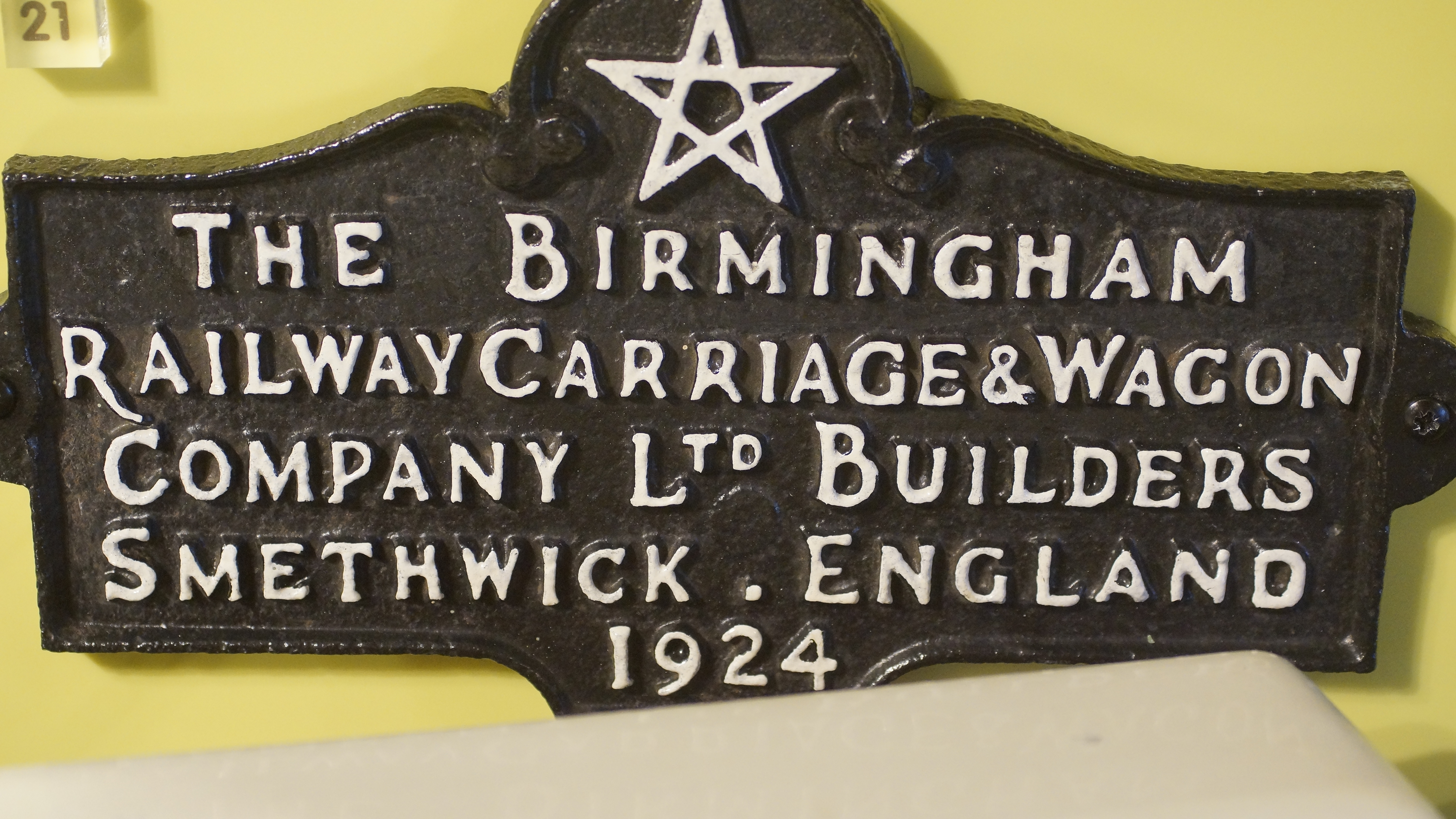
BRCW makers plate, on display in Thinktank, Birmingham Science Museum

The Birmingham Railway Carriage and Wagon Company (BRC&W) was a railway locomotive and carriage builder, founded in Birmingham, England and, for most of its existence, located at nearby Smethwick, with the factory divided by the boundary between the two places. The company was established in 1854.

== Production ==
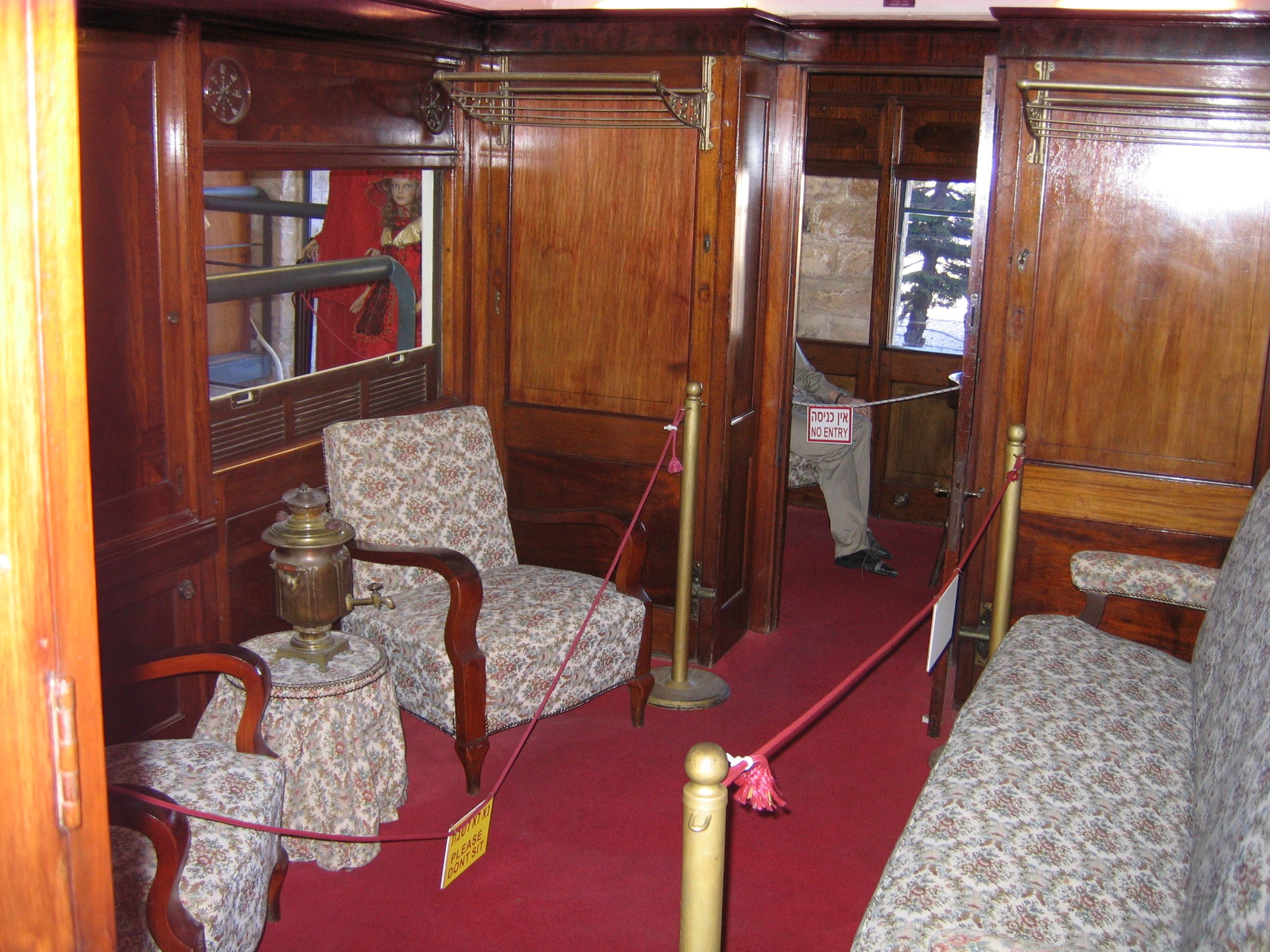
Compartment of luxury saloon coach built for Palestine Railways in 1922, now preserved at the Israel Railway Museum in Haifa

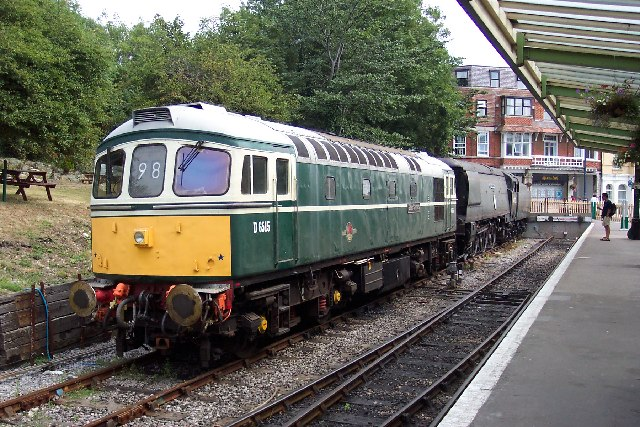
British Rail Class 33 at Swanage

BRC&W made not only carriages and wagons, but a range of vehicles, from aeroplanes and military gliders to buses, trolleybuses and tanks. Nevertheless, it is as a builder of railway rolling stock that the company is best remembered, exporting to most parts of the new and old worlds. It supplied vehicles to all four of the pre-nationalisation "big four" railway companies (LMS, SR, LNER and GWR), British Rail, Pullman (some of which are still in use) and Wagons-Lits, plus overseas railways with diverse requirement including Egypt, India, Iraq, Malaya, Mandate Palestine, South Africa and Nigeria. The company even built, in 1910, Argentina's presidential coach, which still survives, and once carried Eva Perón. Before World War II, the company had built steam-, petrol- and diesel-powered railcars for overseas customers, not to mention bus bodies for Midland Red, and afterwards developed more motive power products, including BR's Class 26, Class 33 (both diesel) and Class 81 (electric) locomotives. Examples of all three types are preserved.

=== Wartime production ===
The company built hospital trains during the Second Boer War. Handley Page Type O bombers and Airco DH.10 Amiens were built during World War I.

During World War II, the company was one of the many companies building the A10 Cruiser, Valentine, Churchill, Cromwell and Challenger tanks. They led the design and production of the Cromwell tank in liaison with Rolls-Royce and Rover on the Meteor engine.

The company also built Hamilcar gliders in 1939–1945.

== Locomotives ==
Some of the locomotives and multiple units built by the company are listed below:

=== Diesel Locomotives ===
- 14 Commonwealth Railways NSU class in 1954. Works numbers DEL1–14
- 5 similar locos for Sierra Leone Development Corporation in 1954 (works numbers DEL 15–19), plus one more in 1962 (works number DEL259)
- 12 Córas Iompair Éireann 101 class in 1956–1957 (works numbers DEL20–31)
- 13 locos for Ghana Railway And Harbours Administration (works numbers DEL32–44)
- 47 British Rail Class 26 in 1958–1959 (works numbers DEL45–91)
- 98 British Rail Class 33 in 1960–1962 (works numbers DEL92–189)
- 69 British Rail Class 27 in 1961–1962 (works numbers DEL190–258)
- 1 British Rail D0260 Lion in 1962 (works number DEL260)

=== Electric Locomotives ===
- British Rail Class 81

=== Diesel Multiple Units ===
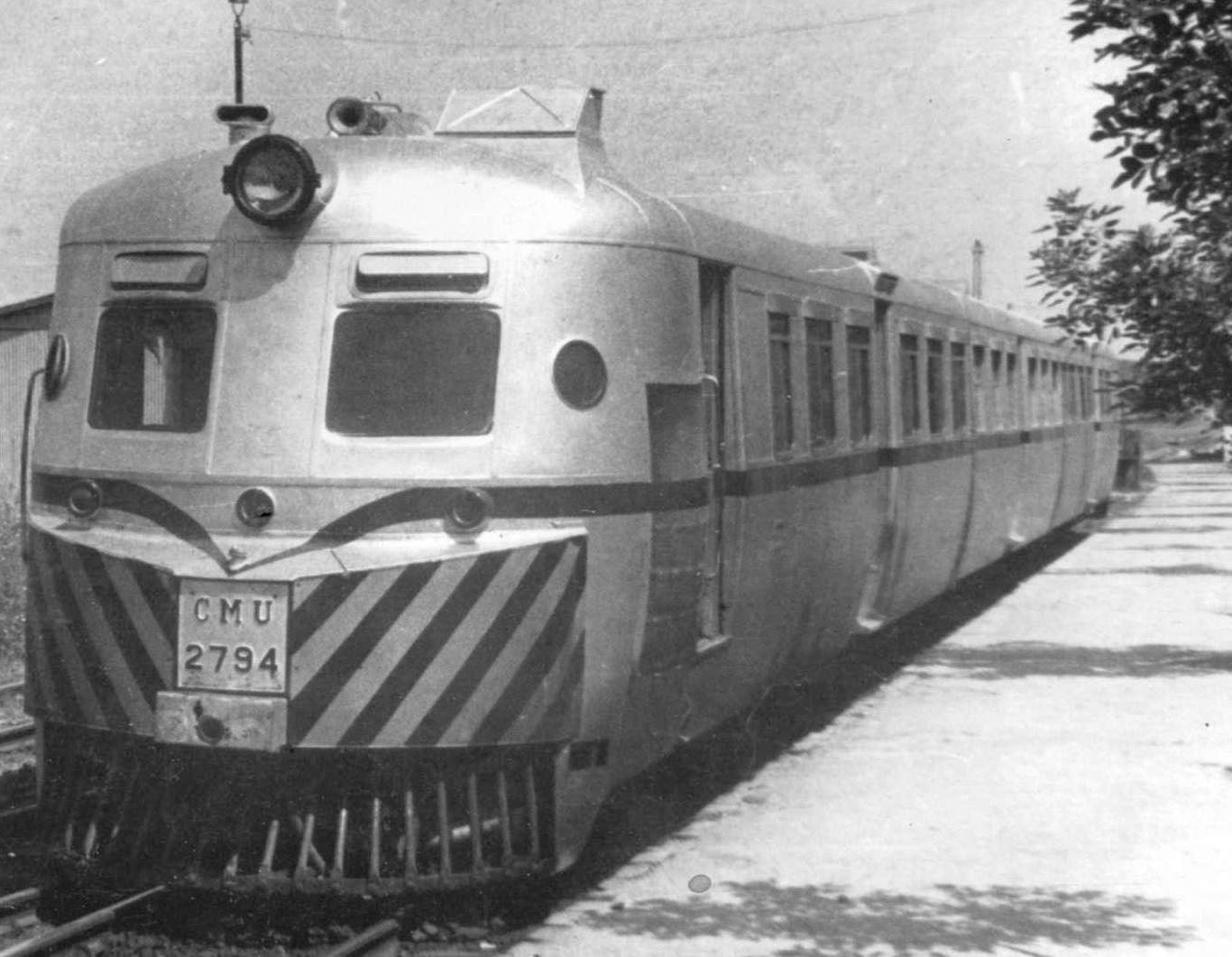
DMU on the Belgrano Sur Line in Buenos Aires, Argentina (1966)

- British Rail Class 104
- British Rail Class 110 (with Drewry Car Co.)
- British Rail Class 118
- Egypt State Railways 3 & 5 Car Railcars

=== Electric Multiple Units ===
- London Underground 1923 Tube Stock
- London Underground 1938 Tube Stock
- London Underground 1956 Tube Stock
- London Underground 1962 Tube Stock The order was transferred to Metro-Cammell owing to the financial problems at BRCW.
- London Underground CO/CP Stock
- London Underground R47 Stock
- London Underground T Stock
- LMS/BR Wirral & Mersey Class 503

== Closure ==
In the years before 1963, the company had built an extensive number of locomotives, diesel multiple unit trains, and Underground cars, but it then became apparent that fewer rolling stock orders were to be expected, and the company restructured itself as an industrial landlord and financing business. The self-funded main line locomotive prototype Lion was a particular disappointment. Powered by a Sulzer 2,750 hp (2,050 kW) diesel engine, it was pitted against another self-funded prototype, Falcon, built by Brush at Loughborough, which had twin 1,400 hp (1,000 kW) Maybach engines. After trials, British Railways preferred the BRCW approach, but ordered them to be built by Brush Traction, and they became British Rail Class 47.

== Preserved BRCW locomotive and units ==
=== Australia ===
The Commonwealth Railway used a large number of A1A-A1A NSU Class locomotives built by the Birmingham Railway Carriage and Wagon Company, several are preserved.

| Built in | Number | Now located at |
|---|---|---|
| 1954 | NSU51 | Pichi Richi Railway at Quorn, South Australia |
| 1954 | NSU52 | Pichi Richi Railway at Quorn, South Australia |
| 1954 | NSU53 | The Ghan Preservation Society at Alice Springs, Northern Territory |
| 1954 | NSU54 | Pichi Richi Railway at Quorn, South Australia |
| 1954 | NSU55 | Steamtown at Peterborough, South Australia |
| 1954 | NSU56 | at Maree, South Australia |
| 1954 | NSU57 | at Maree, South Australia |
| 1954 | NSU58 | The Ghan Preservation Society at Alice Springs, Northern Territory |
| 1954 | NSU59 | The Ghan Preservation Society at Alice Springs, Northern Territory |
| 1954 | NSU60 | at Maree, South Australia |
| 1954 | NSU61 | National Railway Museum at Port Adelaide, South Australia |
| 1954 | NSU62 | Steamtown at Peterborough, South Australia |
| 1954 | NSU63 | at Adelaide River, Northern Territory |
| 1954 | NSU64 | The Ghan Preservation Society at Alice Springs, Northern Territory |

=== Ireland ===
| Railway | Class | Wheel arrangement | Built in | Number | Now located at |
|---|---|---|---|---|---|
| Córas Iompair Éireann | 101 class | A1A-A1A | 1956 | 103 | Irish Traction Group at Carrick-on-Suir |

=== United Kingdom ===
Several ex-British Rail Bo-Bo locomotives are preserved.

| Class | Built in | Number | Now located at |
|---|---|---|---|
| Class 26 | 1958 | D5300 / 26007 | Barrow Hill Engine Shed |
| Class 26 | 1958 | D5301 / 26001 - Eastfield | Caledonian Railway (Brechin) |
| Class 26 | 1958 | D5302 / 26002 | Undisclosed location in Scotland |
| Class 26 | 1958 | D5304 / 26004 | Nemesis Rail, Burton upon Trent |
| Class 26 | 1959 | D5310 / 26010 | Llangollen Railway |
| Class 26 | 1959 | D5311 / 26011 | Nemesis Rail, Burton upon Trent |
| Class 26 | 1959 | D5314 / 26014 | Caledonian Railway (Brechin) |
| Class 26 | 1959 | D5324 / 26024 | Bo'ness and Kinneil Railway |
| Class 26 | 1959 | D5325 / 26025 | Undisclosed location in Scotland |
| Class 26 | 1959 | D5335 / 26035 | Caledonian Railway (Brechin) |
| Class 26 | 1959 | D5338 / 26038 | Bo'ness and Kinneil Railway |
| Class 26 | 1959 | D5340 / 26040 | Private site near Carlisle |
| Class 26 | 1959 | D5343 / 26043 | Gloucestershire Warwickshire Railway |
| Class 27 | 1961 | D5347 / 27001 | Bo'ness and Kinneil Railway |
| Class 27 | 1961 | D5351 / 27005 | Bo'ness and Kinneil Railway |
| Class 27 | 1961 | D5353 / 27007 | Caledonian Railway (Brechin) |
| Class 27 | 1962 | D5370 / 27024 | Caledonian Railway (Brechin) |
| Class 27 | 1962 | D5394 / 27050 | Strathspey Railway |
| Class 27 | 1962 | D5401 / 27056 | Great Central Railway |
| Class 27 | 1962 | D5410 / 27059 | UK Rail Leasing, Leicester |
| Class 27 | 1962 | D5386 / 27066 | Barrow Hill Engine Shed |
| Class 33 | 1960 | D6501 / 33002 - Sea King | South Devon Railway |
| Class 33 | 1960 | D6508 / 33008 - Eastleigh | Battlefield Line |
| Class 33 | 1960 | D6515 / 33012 | Swanage Railway |
| Class 33 | 1960 | D6518 / 33018 | Midland Railway |
| Class 33 | 1960 | D6534 / 33019 - Griffon | Battlefield Line Railway |
| Class 33 | 1960 | D6552 / 33034 | Swanage Railway |
| Class 33 | 1960 | D6553 / 33035 | Barrow Hill Engine Shed |
| Class 33 | 1960 | D6564 / 33046 - Merlin | Midland Railway |
| Class 33 | 1960 | D6566 / 33047 | West Somerset Railway |
| Class 33 | 1960 | D6570 / 33052 - Ashford | Bluebell Railway |
| Class 33 | 1960 | D6571 / 33053 | Mid-Hants Railway |
| Class 33 | 1960 | D6575 / 33057 - Seagull | West Somerset Railway |
| Class 33 | 1960 | D6583 / 33063 - RJ Mitchell | Spa Valley Railway |
| Class 33 | 1960 | D6585 / 33065 - Sealion | Spa Valley Railway |
| Class 33 | 1960 | D6513 / 33102 | Churnet Valley Railway |
| Class 33 | 1960 | D6514 / 33103 Swordfish | Swanage Railway |
| Class 33 | 1960 | D6521 / 33108 | Barrow Hill Engine Shed |
| Class 33 | 1960 | D6525 / 33109 Captain Bill Smith RNR | East Lancashire Railway |
| Class 33 | 1960 | D6527 / 33110 | Bodmin and Wenford Railway |
| Class 33 | 1960 | D6528 / 33111 | Swanage Railway |
| Class 33 | 1960 | D6535 / 33116 Hertfordshire Rail Tours | Great Central Railway |
| Class 33 | 1960 | D6536 / 33117 | East Lancashire Railway |
| Class 33 | 1960 | D6586 / 33201 | Midland Railway |
| Class 33 | 1960 | D6587 / 33202 The Burma Star | Mangapps Railway Museum |
| Class 33 | 1960 | D6593 / 33208 | Battlefield Line Railway |
| Class 81 | 1960 | E3003 / 81002 | Barrow Hill Engine Shed |
