= British Rail D0260 =

Prototype diesel-electric locomotive

BRCW / AEI Lion
- Lion in service in 1962
Type and origin
- Power type: Diesel-electric
- Builder: Birmingham Railway Carriage and Wagon Company and AEI Ltd
- Serial number: DEL260
- Build date: 1962
Specifications
- Configuration
  - UIC: Co′Co′
  - Commonwealth: Co-Co
- Gauge: 1,435 mm (4 ft 8 1/2 in) standard gauge
- Wheel diameter: 3 ft 9 in (1.143 m)
- Wheelbase: 50 ft 9 in (15.47 m)
- Length: 63 ft 6 in (19.35 m)
- Width: 8 ft 10 in (2.69 m)
- Height: 12 ft 10 in (3.91 m)
- Loco weight: 114 long tons (116 t; 128 short tons)
- Fuel capacity: 850 imp gal (3,900 L; 1,020 US gal)
- Prime mover: Sulzer 12LDA28-C
- Traction motors: AEI, 6 off
- Transmission: Diesel-electric
- Train heating: Steam generator
Performance figures
- Maximum speed: 100 mph (160 km/h)
- Power output: 2,750 hp (2,050 kW)
- Tractive effort: 55,000 lbf (244.65 kN)
Career
- Operators: British Railways
- Numbers: D0260
- Axle load class: RA 7
- Disposition: Scrapped

D0260, named Lion, was a one-off prototype Type 4 mainline diesel-electric locomotive built in 1962 by a consortium of Birmingham Railway Carriage and Wagon Company, Sulzer the engine maker and Associated Electrical Industries, at BRCW's Smethwick works near Birmingham.

The locomotive's number was derived from its works number, DEL260.

== Specification ==
Lion was a private venture to meet a requirement from British Railways for a powerful locomotive of Co-Co wheel arrangement, as a substitute for the earlier 1Co-Co1 locomotives such as the Peak classes. The specifications were revealed by the British Transport Commission (BTC) at a meeting on 15 January 1960. (Note: The same meeting also requested a centre-cab Type 1, which became the unsuccessful Class 17.) Train heating was to be by both steam and electric train heating (ETH). (Note: This evidently trivial detail had a crucial effect on the design and service success of most early British diesel locomotives. The steam heating boilers were endlessly unreliable, yet it was some years before there was enough electrically-heated coaching stock to rely on. Finally being able to abandon steam heating was a factor in locomotives such as the Class 33, where the abandonment of the steam boiler gave space and weight allowance to install a more powerful engine.) Unlike the earlier Pilot Scheme, the BTC expected that these prototypes would be funded by the makers, rather than bulk orders being placed sight-unseen. For the Type 4, that gave rise to three prototypes: Falcon, DP2 and Lion, the latter two leading to the Class 50 and Class 47.

Lion used a more powerful development of the same engine as the Class 44 Peaks, but lighter overall (Note: 114-115 tons rather than 133–138 tons) and with a more reliable bogie design. It was of Co-Co wheel arrangement and was fitted with a twin-bank Sulzer 12LDA28C engine of 2,750 hp (2,050 kW). It was a development of the 2,300 hp (1,700 kW) 12LDA28A used for the Peaks. (Note: The final Class 45 Peak, D57, was also fitted with this 2,750 hp (2,050 kW) engine.) At that time, the Sulzer engines were favoured over English Electric's V12 option, despite their greater cost of £45,000 vs. £26,000, and their weight of 22.3 tons vs 19.4 tons.

The locomotive had a design maximum speed of 100 mph (160 km/h) and weight of 114 long tons (116 t; 128 short tons). The design dimensions of both Lion and the Class 47 were the same, although the Class 47 ended up a few tons overweight.

== Construction ==
=== Body ===
Lion's overall construction was as a truss from bufferbeam to bufferbeam, using the full height of the body to cant rail level as the structure. It was built from welded thin steel sheet, as either sheet or pressings. This gave a structure which was stiff and strong, yet avoided the weight of heavy underfloor girder sections. Truss structures had been used previously for the Peaks, although with the channel underframe as well, but these had been the diagonally-braced Pratt truss, which limited access through the sides (Note: The Peaks had long ventilation grilles, but no access hatches) and made access for maintenance difficult, often requiring an overhead crane. Lion used the uncommon Vierendeel truss, which is characterised by its rectangular openings. Although an inefficient structure for bridges, owing to the restricted bracing, the openings allowed better access through the body sides and Lion had central access doors for servicing. The driver's doors were also openings in the truss, which could extend to the full length of the bodyshell and cabs. (Note: The Class 47 also used a full body-depth structure, but this only reached between the driver's doors. Coupling the buffing loads from the ends into the structure required a large triangulated structure in each cab, with members thick enough to restrict the space available for the cab windows.)

Engine cooling was performed entirely in the roof section above the cant rail, explaining the lack of large cooling grilles in the body sides. The cooling group was provided by Serck and used two radiators in a removable pack in the roof over the Nº1 end and the Spanner Swirlyflow steam heating boiler. Air was drawn in from the sides, through the panels, and exhausted upwards in the centre by two electric fans. The main roof section, above the engine, was unusual in that it was a translucent fibreglass moulding, which provided light into the engine room, despite the body's small windows. This lightweight moulding could be raised upwards by pneumatic cylinders when stationary, to act as an air vent before needing access to the engine. The roof could then be slid lengthways, allowing fairly major engine servicing such as piston replacement, without needing a large overhead crane to remove a metal roof. The oil-wetted engine air filters were also mounted in the roof section, leaving more space in the body.

The external styling, particularly the cab design and its fibreglass roof panels, resembled the Class 35 Hymeks, as they shared the same designer. The outer cladding skin was a load-bearing steel sheet. As such skins otherwise tended to show uneven ripples, Lion had this stiffened by five lengthwise fluted ribs. The livery stood out from other locomotives, although it also showed dirt, as it was painted white overall with the side ribs picked out in gold.

== Testing ==
BR tested it initially on Western Region services out of London Paddington based at Wolverhampton Stafford Road Shed. Later it moved to Finsbury Park on the Eastern Region for services London King's Cross. However, BR decided to purchase its new Type 4 fleet from Brush Traction (the Class 47) and so D0260 was withdrawn in February 1964.

== Disposal ==
Full details of Lion's final withdrawal have never been fully made public, and even the BRC&W workforce were not informed of its fate. But at some time after withdrawal, Lion was moved to AEI's works at Attercliffe where AEI became responsible for stripping the locomotive, primarily to recover their electrical components. During this process Sulzer recovered their 12LDA28C power unit and radiators (the engine was sent to be reconditioned at Vickers in Barrow-in-Furness, and was subsequently installed into an unknown production Class 47). What remained, principally the body shell and bogies, were scrapped at the Attercliffe yard of scrap merchant Thos. W. Ward. The date on which Ward finally cut up the remains is unclear. One report puts it as late as 1965.

== Models ==
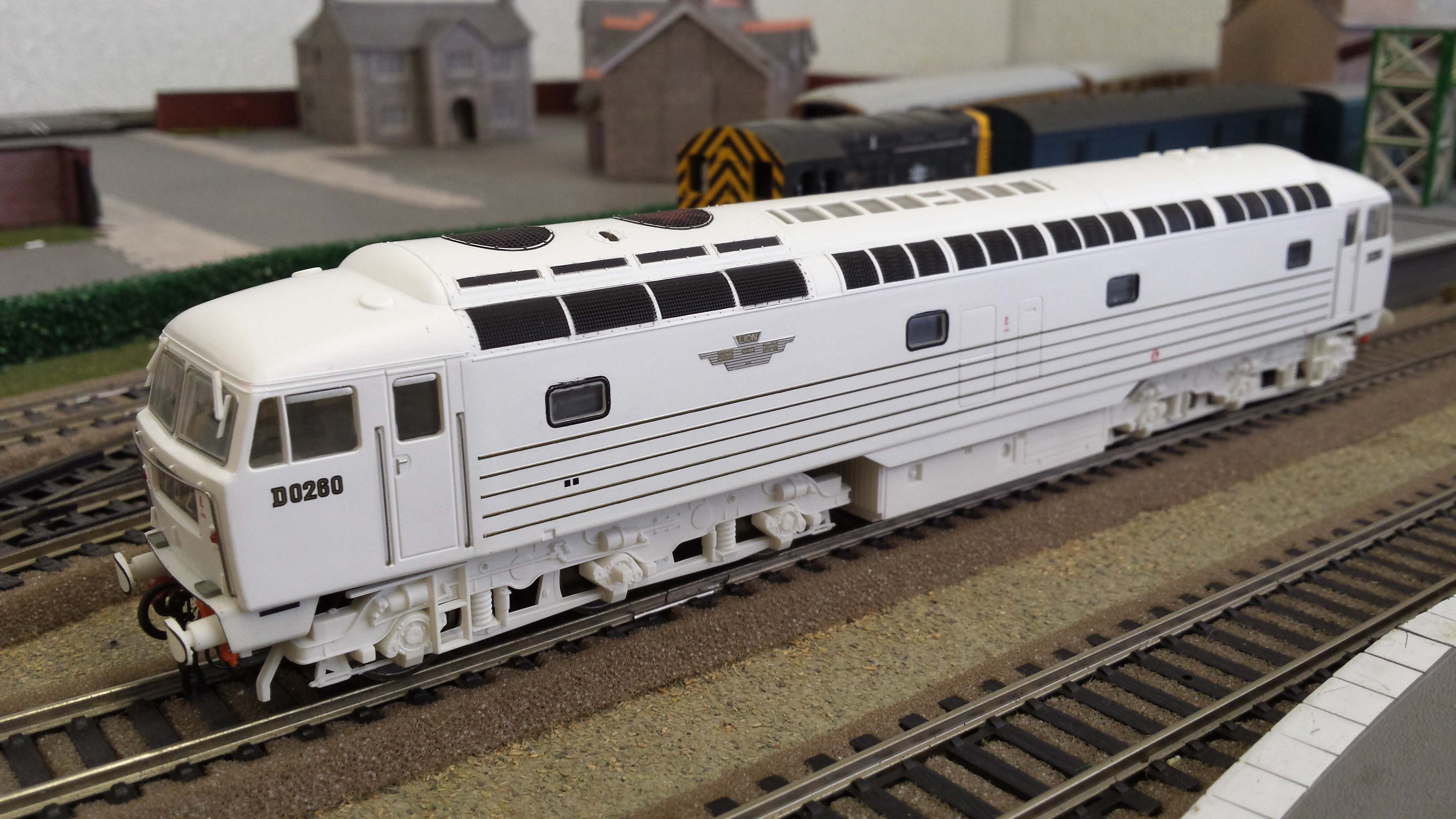
The Heljan 00 gauge model of Lion, from the Nº1 end and the roof cooling group

D0260 Lion is available as a kit and ready-to-run in 00 gauge by Silver Fox Models.

There is now a limited edition, of 4,000, 00 gauge model of Lion in its white livery produced by Heljan.
