= Thirsk rail crash =

Thirsk rail crash may refer to one of the following railway accidents in Thirsk, North Yorkshire, England:

- Thirsk rail crash on 2 November 1892, collision between two trains due to signalling error by exhausted signalman
- Thirsk rail crash on 31 July 1967, collision between a train and a derailed wagon
