= British Rail Class 53 =

Prototype for class of diesel electric locomotives

British Rail Class 53 (Falcon)
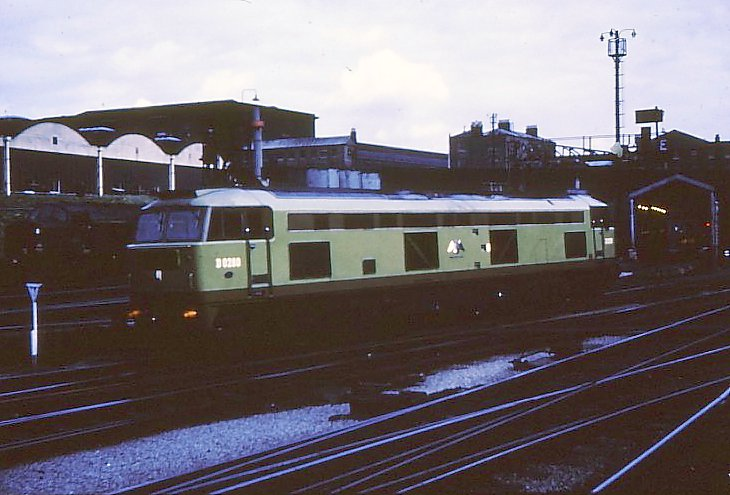
- D0280 at London King's Cross
Type and origin
- Power type: Diesel-electric
- Builder: Brush Traction
- Serial number: 280
- Build date: 1961
Specifications
- Configuration
  - UIC: Co′Co′
  - Commonwealth: Co-Co
- Gauge: 4 ft 8 1/2 in (1,435 mm)
- Wheel diameter: 3 ft 7 in (1,092 mm)
- Wheelbase: 56 ft 4 in (17.17 m)
- Length: 68 ft 10 in (20.98 m)
- Width: 8 ft 10 in (2.69 m)
- Height: 12 ft 10 in (3.91 m)
- Loco weight: 115 long tons (117 t; 129 short tons)
- Fuel capacity: 1,440 imp gal (6,500 L; 1,730 US gal)
- Prime mover: 2× Maybach MD655
- Traction motors: Brush, 6 of
- Cylinders: 12 (each engine)
- Train heating: Spanner Mk III 2,500-pound (1,100 kg) per hour steam generator
- Loco brake: Brakeforce: 59 long tons-force (588 kN)
- Train brakes: Vacuum, later: Air
Performance figures
- Maximum speed: 100 mph (161 km/h)
- Power output: 2,880 hp (2,150 kW)
- Tractive effort: 60,000 lbf (266.9 kN)
Career
- Operators: British Railways
- Numbers: D0280, later 1200
- Axle load class: Route availability: 7 (6 from 1969)
- Locale: Eastern Region; Western Region (from 1965)
- Withdrawn: October 1975
- Disposition: Scrapped May 1976

D0280 Falcon was a single one-off prototype diesel-electric locomotive, built for British Railways in 1961. It was one of a series of three prototypes: Falcon, DP2 and Lion, eventually leading to the Class 47 and Class 50. A requirement was expressed by the BTC at a meeting on 15 January 1960 for new Type 4 designs of Co-Co arrangement, which would be lighter than the earlier 1Co-Co1 locomotives such as the Peak classes, produced under the Pilot Scheme.

Brush had a licence to build the Maybach MD655 engine, as already used in the Western region diesel-hydraulics, although their licence limited them to diesel-electric locomotives. These engines were of lower weight than their competitors, which led Brush to consider using a pair of them, like the Western hydraulics. Design work began in 1959 under contract Nº 04/20600, before the BTC requirement had been issued.

British Rail later assigned Class 53 and the running number 1200. While not in any sense a failure, the design was the victim of advances in locomotive technology (specifically, the power obtainable from single medium-speed diesel engines) and was never duplicated.

== History ==
The Falcon project began in 1959 to design a new, lightweight diesel-electric Type 4 locomotive to meet a British Railways' requirement for second generation Type 4 diesel locomotives. No single lightweight diesel engine was powerful enough, so the Falcon project used twin German-designed Maybach MD655 engines like those in the Class 52 Western diesel-hydraulic locomotives of the Western Region. These drove Brush generators and traction motors, rather than the hydraulic transmission of the Westerns. The engines of the Warships and Westerns were built under licence by Bristol Siddeley, part of Hawker Siddeley, who then purchased Brush Traction in 1957, making the licensed engines available to Brush.

The prototype, wearing a livery of lime green and chestnut brown and bearing the number D0280 after its Brush project number 280, emerged from Brush's Loughborough works in September 1961. Initial testing took place on the Eastern Region, based at Finsbury Park, and the London Midland Region. Subsequently, the locomotive was transferred to the Western Region for power-unit performance testing, where it was tested up the Lickey Incline on 6 February 1962. Returning to Brush in March 1962, it received cast Falcon nameplates during an overhaul and upgrade lasting over a year.

Returning to British Railways in 1963, Falcon spent six months working out of Darnall shed, Sheffield, on passenger and freight trains, after which its testing was completed. Another year out of service followed, the locomotive returning in British Railways in two-tone green with half yellow ends and intended for active service. There was, by then, no chance of Falcon being the forerunner of a line of production locomotives. Advances in diesel engine technology made it obsolete almost from the beginning, with the development of larger and comparatively lightweight single powerplants. Brush Traction's own single-engined Type 4 design, which became the BR Class 47, was the successful contender, with 512 locomotives eventually produced. Falcon was an evolutionary dead end - it was a functional locomotive, worth keeping in service, but there were never going to be more.

From 1965 onwards the locomotive, still owned by Brush, was under contract with British Railways so that operation and repair would be handled by them, with only major repairs being handed back to the builder. Allocated to Bristol Bath Road alongside the Class 52 Western fleet, the locomotive worked Paddington-Bristol diagrams with them. In 1970, British Rail bought the locomotive from Brush at its scrap value. BREL Swindon rebuilt it; air braking replaced vacuum braking, and it was repainted in corporate Rail Blue with full yellow ends with the new number 1200. Falcon was first allocated to Bristol Bath Road again working alongside Class 52s, and by March 1974 to Ebbw Junction, for use on iron ore trains. During its time at Ebbw Junction, the steam heating boiler was isolated.

In 1975, the locomotive was deemed uneconomic to operate due to its non-standard status and, despite efforts to preserve it, Falcon was broken up in March–April 1976 at Cashmore's of Newport.

== Model railways ==
In late 2007, Heljan introduced DCC-ready OO gauge models of Falcon in lime green, BR green and BR blue liveries, with a total production run of 2,400 items.

== Sources ==
- Clough, David N. (2005). "Large Type 4 Prototypes". D0280 Falcon. Diesel Pioneers. Ian Allan. pp. 120–127. ISBN 978-0-7110-3067-1.
- Toms, George (1978). Brush Diesel Locomotives, 1940-78. Sheffield: Turntable Publications. ISBN 978-0902844483. OCLC 11213057.
- Stevens-Stratten, S.W.; Carter, R.S. (1978). British Rail Main-Line Diesels. Shepperton: Ian Allan Ltd. ISBN 978-0-7110-0617-1.
- "Falcon's final flight". Traction. No. 105. Warners Group Publications. July 2003. ISSN 1354-2680.
