= DSB class P =

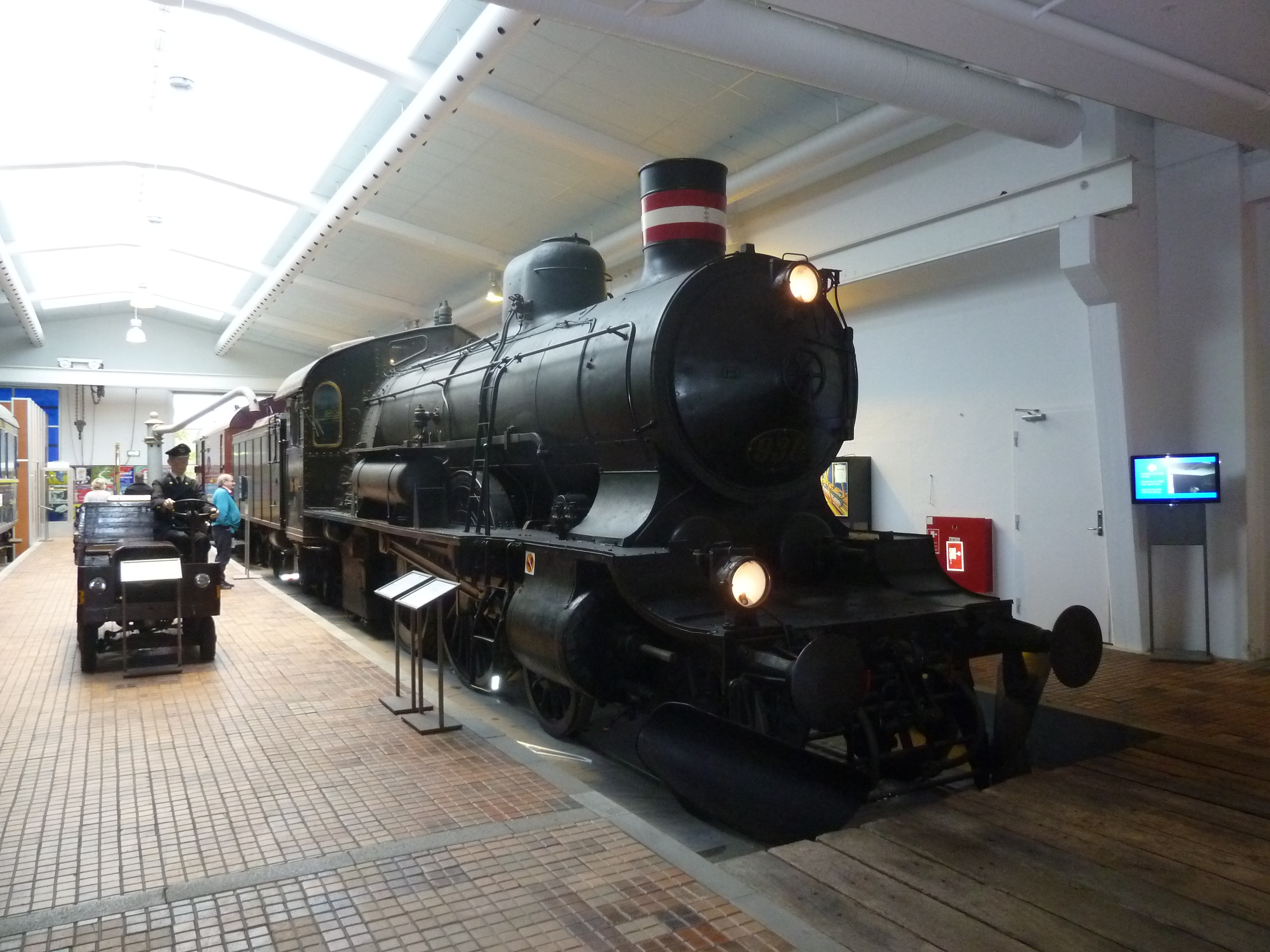
- A preserved class P locomotive at the Danish Railway Museum in Odense in 2011
Type and origin
- Power type: Steam
- Builder: Hanomag (19); Schwartzkopff (14)
- Build date: 1907–1910
- Total produced: 33
Specifications
- Configuration
  - Whyte: 4-4-2
  - UIC: 2'B1
- Gauge: 1,435 mm (4 ft 8 1/2 in)
- Driver dia.: 1,984 mm (6 ft 6.1 in)
- Length: 18.515 m (60 ft 9 in) over buffers
- Axle load: 19 tonnes (18.7 long tons; 20.9 short tons)
- Total weight: 117.4 tonnes (115.5 long tons; 129.4 short tons)
- Fuel type: Coal
- Fuel capacity: 6 tonnes (5.9 long tons; 6.6 short tons)
- Boiler pressure: 15 kg/cm^{2} (1,470 kPa; 213 psi)
Career
- Operators: DSB
- Numbers: P901–P933
- Locale: Denmark

The class P was a series of steam locomotives of the Danish State Railways, designed by chief mechanical engineer O.F.A. Busse and introduced in 1907. With a wheel arrangement of 4-4-2 (2'B1 in UIC classification), they were well suited to express trains, and were the first steam locomotives in Denmark heavier than 100 tons. They saw service on most DSB main lines, but were at their best on the relatively level Copenhagen to Korsør and Fredericia to Esbjerg services.

Due to shortages of powerful locomotives with low axle load during World War II, seven of the class P locomotives were rebuilt to a 4-6-2 arrangement and designated class PR, starting in 1943. Two of the class P locomotives have been preserved, as well as one unit of class PR.
