= 1967 Thirsk rail crash =

Train crash in Yorkshire, England on 31 July 1967

Coordinates: 54.202°N 1.343°W

Thirsk rail crash

Details
- Date: 31 July 1967; 15:17
- Location: Thirsk, Yorkshire
- Country: England, UK
- Line: East Coast Main Line
- Cause: Rolling stock failure

Statistics
- Trains: 2
- Deaths: 7
- Injured: 45
- Damage: 1 locomotive

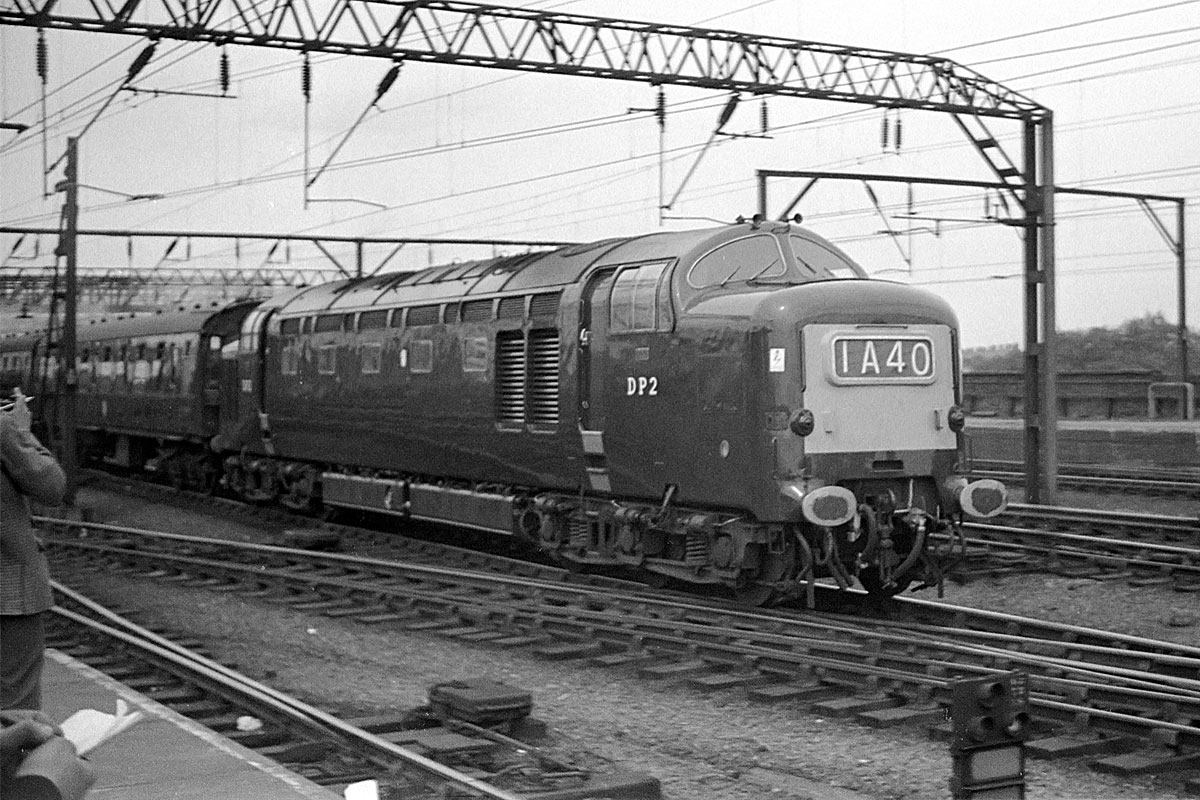
DP2, the locomotive of the express, seen around 1962

The Thirsk rail crash occurred on 31 July 1967 at Thirsk, Yorkshire, England on the British Rail East Coast Main Line.

== Events ==
The 12:00 1A26 express train from King's Cross to Edinburgh and Aberdeen (Note: Front two coaches were scheduled to go forward, attached to the 18:50 Edinburgh-Aberdeen service) collided at speed with the wreckage of a derailed freight train around 15:17 on that day. Seven people were killed and 45 injured, 15 seriously. Following the accident, three of the four lines (the Up [Southbound] and Down [Northbound] Fast lines and the Down Slow line) were blocked by the wreckage of the collision. The Up Slow line was not damaged and was used by special trains to take the dead and injured to Newcastle upon Tyne. The line was also used later that day for both Up and Down trains to clear other trains stranded in the area by the blockage but was later used only for Up trains, Down trains being diverted via Harrogate over the Harrogate-Northallerton line which, though it had been closed, was re-opened for the purpose. Special bus services were introduced between Leeds and Northallerton and between York and Thirsk to replace local train services disrupted by the accident. Breakdown cranes were ordered from York, Leeds and Gateshead (Newcastle), and the derailed vehicles were cleared from the track by 23:30 on 1 August. Repairs to the track were speedy and the three damaged lines were all open by 16:20 on 2 August, all with an initial speed limit of 20 mph (32 km/h).

An extract from The Ministry of Transport report into the accident states:

The 02:40 Cliffe to Uddingston cement train was travelling on the Down Slow line at about 45 mph (72 km/h) – the maximum speed permitted at the time for trains conveying loaded wagons of this type, when the rear axle of the 12th wagon became derailed towards the cess on plain track. As the train proceeded, the derailed wheels moved further towards the cess smashing the timber sleepers in the track until, after travelling some 170 yards (155 m); the coupling between the 11th and 12th wagons fractured and the vacuum hose pipe parted, causing the brakes to become fully applied on both portions of the train. The front portion proceeded along the line for 470 yards (430 m) and then stopped. The 13th to 20th wagons in the rear portion became derailed and went down the embankment, and came to rest mostly on their sides. The 23rd wagon, however, was slewed round more or less at right angles to the line and stopped with its leading end some 2 ft (0.61 m) foul of the Down Fast line.

The passenger train was the 12:00 express from King's Cross to Edinburgh, and it comprised 13 coaches drawn by a Type 4 diesel-electric locomotive. It was running under clear signals on the Down Fast line at about 80 m.p.h. (128 km/h) close behind the freight train. The driver saw at a distance of about 600 yd (549 m). what seemed to him to be a cloud of dust and then he saw the cement wagon foul of the line on which his train was travelling. He applied the brakes fully but he could not prevent a collision, and the left-hand side of the locomotive struck the wagon at a speed of about 50 mph (80 km/h). The locomotive and the leading seven coaches were derailed towards the Up Fast line but they remained upright and inline; the rear six coaches remained on the track. The left-hand side of the locomotive was extensively damaged and the driver and second man were fortunate to escape injury. The derailed coaches were all severely damaged but the most serious damage was to the leading coach which had its left-hand side ripped away, and to the next two coaches which were severely torn, all by contact with the wagon.

The train was well filled and I regret to report that seven passengers were killed and 45 were injured and removed to hospital where they were detained; the injuries to 15 passengers were serious. The collision was witnessed by a farm-hand working nearby who immediately went to a telephone and summoned assistance. The driver of the freight train also rang the signalman at Thirsk from the telephone on a signal near which his locomotive had stopped, and asked for the emergency services to be sent urgently. These services responded with commendable promptitude and, despite the difficult access to the site, the first ambulance arrived at 15:40; the last of the injured had been removed by 16:30.

The 45mph limit for the 26 CemFlo wagons in the freight train was lower than the designed limit of 60mph following derailments with this type of wagon, and this was the speed at the time of derailment. After the derailment and separation of his train, the freight train driver ran back to use a telephone on a signal post about 100 yards (90 m) behind his locomotive. He had no time to speak to the signalman before, to his horror, he first heard and then saw 1A26 loom into view and despite heavy braking, strike the fouling wagon. The buffer beam, draw-gear and coupling shackle of this wagon were ripped clean off by the force of the impact and thrown 71 yd (65 m) into an adjacent field.

As 1A26 had approached signal D19, the driver was not accelerating as hard as he normally would have been because he was uneasy about the view ahead—he should have been able to see the next signal but it was obscured by a cloud of smoke or dust and he had instinctively backed off the throttle. As he passed D19 he became aware of the cement wagon across his path about 400 yards (365 m) ahead. He made an emergency application of the train vacuum brake and the locomotive air brake. He operated the sanding gear to increase the grip on the rails and shut down the engine of his locomotive to reduce the risk of fire in case the derailed tank wagon contained flammable liquid as he realised he now had no chance to avoid the collision. As he approached the obstruction he became aware of the freight train guard running back towards him waving a red flag.

On impact the locomotive of 1A26 DP2 lurched to the right and the left hand side of the cab was severely damaged along with the left hand side of the first three coaches, all side-corridor BR Mark 1s. On coaches 2 and 3 this was fortunately on the corridor side, but on the leading coach this was the compartment side and this is where most of the casualties were.

The Thirsk signalman averted further disaster by throwing all his signals to danger and sending an "obstruction danger" bell code to the Northallerton and Pilmoor boxes either side, stopping a London-bound express at Thirsk station less than 5 miles (8 km) to the north. 1A26 had come to rest fouling the Up Fast line and this express would have struck the wreckage only a few minutes later. Also at the time an RAF aircraft flying over saw the crash scene and immediately called for help to be sent.

== Aftermath ==
Locomotive DP2 was damaged beyond repair and finally broken up for spares in 1970.

Locomotive D283, the English Electric type 4 diesel hauling the goods train was undamaged.

== Cause and prevention ==
The wagon derailment was blamed on excessive wear in the suspension components, (Note: The components that suffered excessive wear were only present on wagons constructed by Metro-Cammell and wagons built by other manufacturers were not affected) thought to be caused by cement dust abrasion, in combination with slight variations in both wheel-set diameter and track alignment. This resulted in a typical "waddling", lateral oscillation of "CemFlo" tank wagons. Furthermore, it was a number of other accidents involving suspected poor riding of CemFlo wagons that resulted in progressively more severe speed restrictions being placed on any trains containing this type. At the Thirsk crash, the oscillation built up to such a state that it eventually threw the rear wheel-set of one wagon off the rails, even though the train was travelling below the maximum 45 mph (72 km/h) permitted for four-wheeled wagons. Indeed, the pronounced waddling of this very train was noted by the signalman at Pilmoor in his log as he recorded its passing about 6 minutes before the derailment. Also at Pilmoor, two men were watching the trains pass. One of them had noted that the leading wheel-set of a wagon "somewhere just forward of the halfway point" had dropped heavily into the gap on a cross-over then rebounded higher than the rest. At the time, although he noted it, he thought little of it, but on hearing of the accident he felt compelled to bring this to the attention of the authorities.

Following the accident, wagon LA201 was selected for rolling-road tests at Doncaster having been judged to be in an almost identical condition to LA223 – the first vehicle to derail in the crash. As speed increased, flange-to-flange hunting (moving from side to side) was noted to set in under both laden and unladen conditions. Critical speed was noted as between 24 and 27 mph (39 and 43 km/h).

Following the accident, British Rail imposed a maximum speed of 35 mph (56 km/h) for loaded CemFlo Wagons and 50 mph (80 km/h) unloaded.

== Sources ==
- McMullen, D. (5 September 1968). Railway Accident: Report on the Derailment and subsequent Collision that occurred on 31st July, 1967, at Thirsk (Report). London: H.M.S.O. SBN 11-550036-7 – via The Railways Archive.
- Brown, Murray (August 2007). "Disaster at Thirsk – DP2 destroyed". Rail Express. 135: 20–23.
