= British Rail DP2 =

1962 British prototype diesel locomotive

English Electric DP2
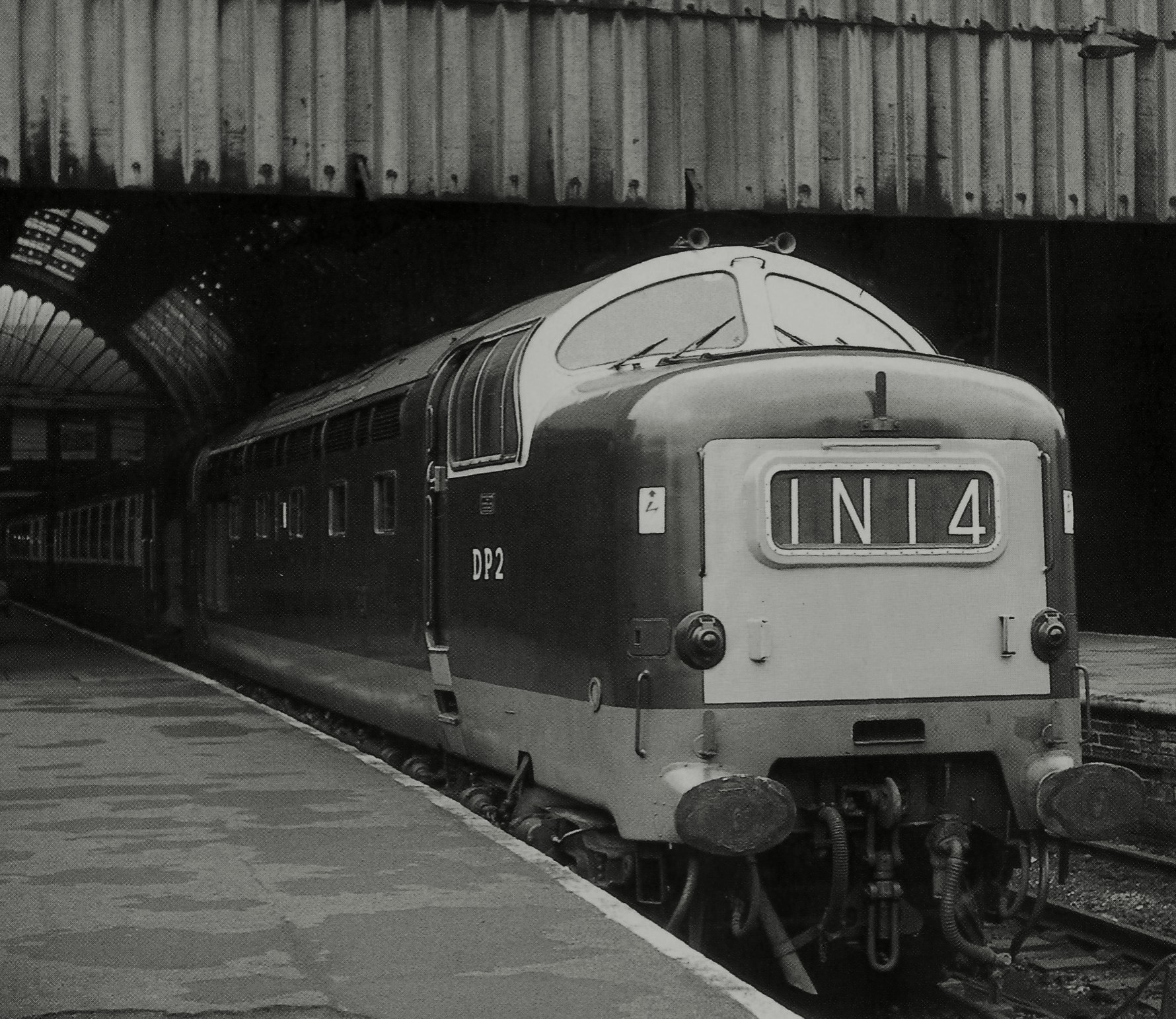
- DP2 at Bradford Exchange, 1967
Type and origin
- Power type: Diesel-electric
- Builder: English Electric at Vulcan Foundry
- Serial number: English Electric: 3205; Vulcan Foundry: D733
- Build date: 1962
Specifications
- Configuration
  - UIC: Co'Co'
- Gauge: 1,435 mm (4 ft 8 1/2 in) standard gauge
- Wheel diameter: 3 ft 7 in (1.092 m)
- Wheelbase: 58 ft 6 in (17.83 m)
- Length: 69 ft 6 in (21.18 m)
- Width: 8 ft 9 1/2 in (2.680 m)
- Height: 12 ft 10 in (3.91 m)
- Loco weight: 105 long tons (107 t; 118 short tons)
- Fuel capacity: 900 imp gal (4,100 L; 1,100 US gal)
- Prime mover: EE 16CSVT
- Traction motors: EE, 6 off
- Transmission: Diesel Electric
- Train heating: Clayton Mk.1 steam generator ETH
Performance figures
- Maximum speed: 90 mph (140 km/h)
- Power output: 2,700 hp (2,000 kW)
- Tractive effort: 50,000 lbf (222.41 kN)
Career
- Operators: British Railways
- Power class: Type 4
- Numbers: DP2
- Axle load class: Route Availability: 6
- Disposition: Wrecked July 1967, withdrawn September 1967, scrapped 1970.

DP2, meaning Development Prototype number 2, was a one-off prototype Type 4 mainline diesel locomotive, built by English Electric in 1962. DP2 was effectively the prototype for the later Class 50; it trialled the engine and electronic systems later used in that class of locomotives.

Externally DP2 was visually similar to a Class 55 "Deltic" locomotive, as it used a modified Deltic bodyshell, but internally it had a single engine of a different type to the twin-engined Deltics. DP2 was used firstly in trials, and then in ordinary service until 1967, when it was wrecked in a serious accident at Thirsk.

== History ==
=== Design ===
The locomotive was built in 1962 by English Electric at their Vulcan Foundry in Newton-le-Willows to demonstrate its wares to British Railways. As the Deltics were then in production, it was decided to produce the locomotive on the same production line; the bodyshell used for DP2 reputedly being the eighteenth made. While DP2 looked like a Deltic in outline, there were many detail differences; particularly the large bodyside radiator vents at one end, and the single roof fan as opposed to the four symmetrically placed fans on the Deltics. These differences revealed that DP2 was totally different from the twin-engined Deltics internally, having only a single prime mover and generator. The loco was later updated with electronic control systems to become the forerunner of the Class 50.

It was of Co-Co wheel arrangement and was fitted with an English Electric 16CSVT engine of 2,700 hp (2,000 kW). It had a maximum speed of 90 mph (140 km/h) and weighed 105 long tons (107 t; 118 short tons). It was initially painted in standard BR Brunswick Green livery and later (from 1965) in two-tone green livery with a light green lower bodyside band.

=== Operation ===
Its first test service was on 2 May 1962, running light from Newton-le-Willows to Chester and back. Its final test with Vulcan Foundry was a fast running test six days later, with a 15-coach train of 475 long tons (483 t; 532 short tons) between Crewe and Penrith, passing Tebay at 80 mph (130 km/h). On 11 May, the locomotive was lent to the London Midland Region for crew training where it undertook a few Crewe–Birmingham runs.

From 14 May 1962, BR tested it on regular London Midland Region services out of London Euston and later on the Eastern Region from London King's Cross. Following its first major overhaul in mid-1965 and clad in new two-tone green Deltic livery, it was used on the Sheffield Pullman workings until 1966. It was fitted with electronic tractive effort and wheel-slip control which gave it superior acceleration to a Deltic, in spite of possessing only 82% of the power. It was placed in a Deltic Diagram covering the 01.32 King's Cross - Edinburgh and the 22.50 Edinburgh - King's Cross, These duties were performed quite punctually and without complaint. In August 1966, it was derailed at Edinburgh Waverley station.

=== Accident ===
On 31 July 1967 it was involved in a serious accident at Thirsk, colliding at speed with the de-railed Cliffe (Kent) to Uddingston (Glasgow) cement train. DP2 sustained severe front and left hand side damage, and was taken to York shed where it remained sheeted over. The damage proved to be so great that it was considered uneconomical to repair. It was withdrawn from BR service in September 1967 and moved to the Vulcan Foundry where it was stored until it was dismantled in 1968, its reusable parts being provided to the Class 50 pool of spares. Its engine initially went to D417/50 017 'Royal Oak', but ended its working days in D437/50 037 'Illustrious'.

== Models ==
The DP2 "Prototype Deltic" is being made as a kit and ready-to-run in OO gauge by Silver Fox Models. In 2012, Heljan introduced ready-to-run OO gauge models of DP2 in both liveries.

== Gallery ==
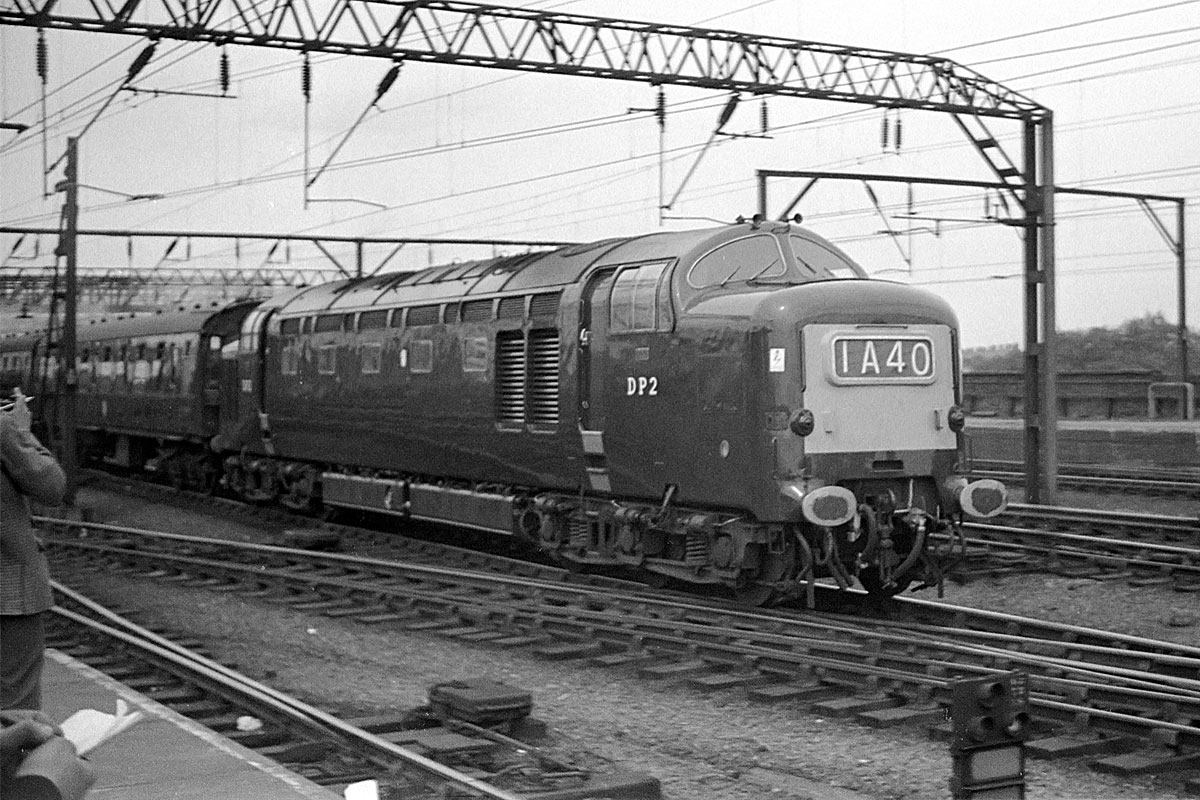
DP2 at Crewe around 1962.

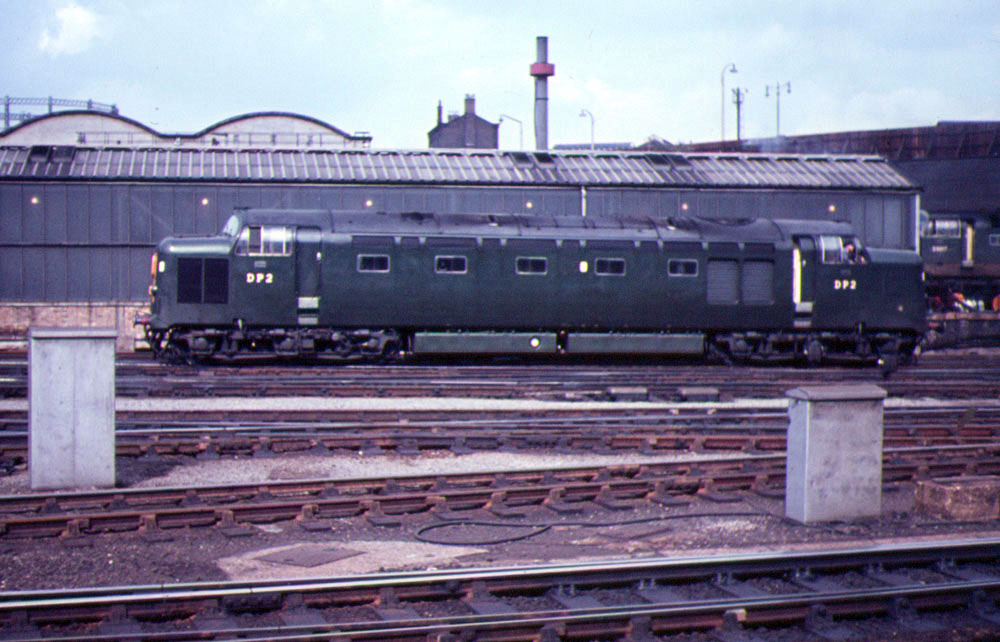
DP2 at King's Cross, 1963.

== Sources ==
- Stevens-Stratten, S.W.; Carter, R.S. (1978). British Rail Main-Line Diesels. Shepperton: Ian Allan Ltd. ISBN 0-7110-0617-2.
- Clough, David (2004). Class 50s in Operation. Shepperton: Ian Allan Ltd. ISBN 0-7110-2971-7.
- Tufnell, Robert (1985). Prototype Locomotives. David & Charles. pp. 89–94. ISBN 0-7153-8397-3.
