= British Rail Class 27 =

Class of 69 1250hp diesel-electric locomotives

BRCW Type 2 British Rail Class 27
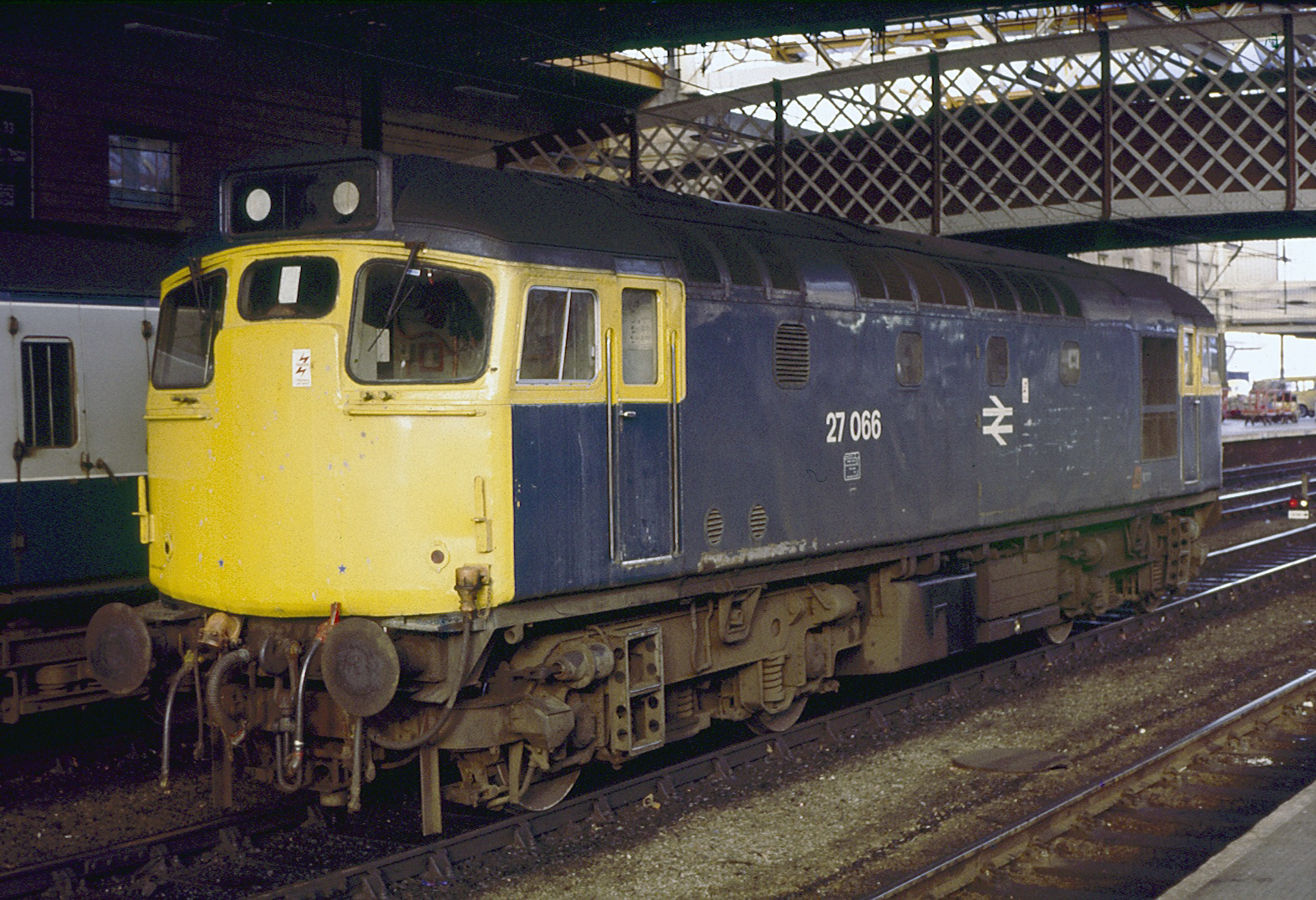
- A Class 27 at Carlisle.
Type and origin
- Power type: Diesel-electric
- Builder: Birmingham Railway Carriage and Wagon Company
- Serial number: DEL190–DEL258
- Build date: 1961–1962
- Total produced: 69
Specifications
- Configuration
  - UIC: Bo'Bo'
  - Commonwealth: Bo-Bo
- Gauge: 4 ft 8 1/2 in (1,435 mm) standard gauge
- Wheel diameter: 3 ft 7 in (1.092 m)
- Minimum curve: 5 chains (100 m)
- Wheelbase: 39 ft 0 in (11.89 m)
- Length: 50 ft 9 in (15.47 m)
- Width: 8 ft 10 in (2.69 m)
- Height: 12 ft 8 in (3.86 m)
- Loco weight: Originally: 72.50 long tons (73.7 t; 81.2 short tons); 71–76 tonnes (70–75 long tons; 78–84 short tons)
- Fuel capacity: 685 imp gal (3,110 L; 823 US gal)
- Prime mover: Sulzer 6LDA28-B
- Generator: DC
- Traction motors: four GEC WT459 DC traction motors
- Transmission: Diesel electric
- MU working: ★ Blue Star
- Train heating: As built, Steam generator subclass 27/2, Electric Train Heating, Houchin 120 kW (160 hp) alternator powered by Deutz 8-cylinder air-cooled diesel engine, type F8L413
- Train brakes: Initially 14 dual-braked, 10 fitted with additional air brakes later on. Remainder vacuum only.
Performance figures
- Maximum speed: 90 mph (145 km/h)
- Power output: Engine: 1,250 hp (932 kW) @750 rpm At rail: 933 hp (696 kW)
- Tractive effort: Maximum: 42,000 lbf (187 kN); Continuous: 25,000 lbf (111 kN)
- Brakeforce: 34 long tons-force (340 kN)
Career
- Operators: British Railways
- Numbers: D5347–D5415; later 27001–27066
- Axle load class: Route availability 6 (RA 5 from 1969)
- First run: 1961
- Retired: 1966, 1975-1987
- Disposition: 8 preserved, remainder scrapped

The British Rail Class 27 is a diesel locomotive built by the Birmingham Railway Carriage and Wagon Company (BRCW) during 1961 and 1962. They were a development of the earlier Class 26; both were originally classified as the BRCW Type 2. The Class 27s were numbered D5347-D5415.

== Working life ==
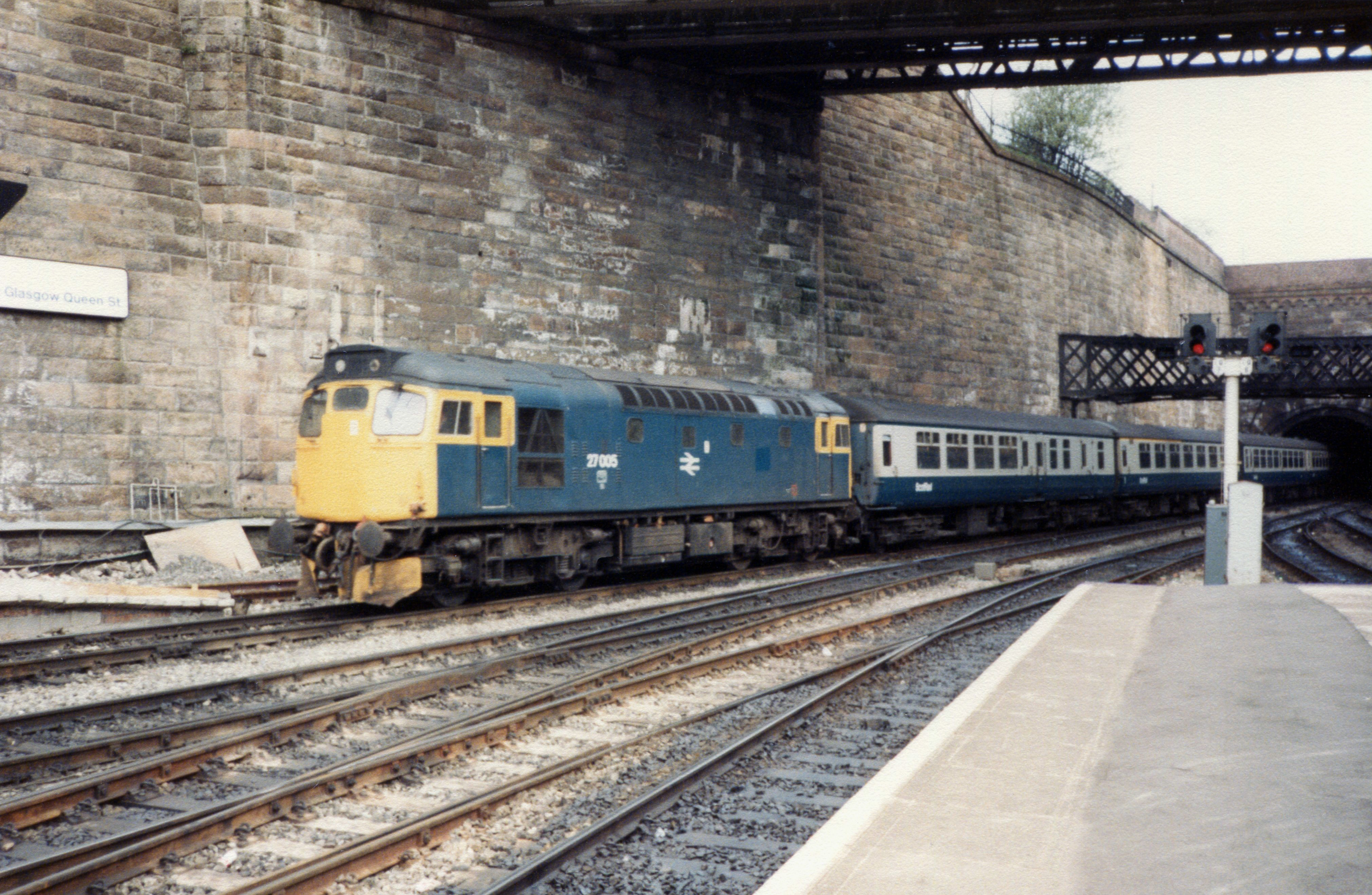
27005 at Glasgow Queen Street

Distribution of locomotives, March 1974
British Rail Class 27 is located in Scotland
Code	Name	Quantity
ED	Eastfield	57
HA	Haymarket	11
Withdrawn (1966)		1
Total built:		69

Original allocations were D5347–D5369 to Glasgow Eastfield, D5370–D5378 to Thornaby and D5379–D5415 to London Cricklewood for Tilbury Boat trains and Cross-London freight services. In the period September to December 1963, some of the Cricklewood allocation were transferred to Leicester and the Thornaby allocation was also nominally transferred to Leicester to join them in December 1965.

Traffic changes, combined with reallocation of Class 25s, led to the gradual transfer of the Leicester and Cricklewood locomotives to Scotland during 1969; this concentrated the whole class within Scotland and being part of the replacement fleet that allowed the withdrawal of the poorly performing Clayton Class 17 locomotives from traffic. For many years, they were extensively used on the West Highland Line.

By September 1986, the final vacuum brake only locomotives had been withdrawn, regular duties on passenger services had ceased and only twenty-one of the class remained, allocated entirely to Eastfield depot. A mass withdrawal in July 1987 due to the presence of blue asbestos left 27008 as the last in service. Its final working was on 13 August and the loco was officially withdrawn on 19 August 1987. The Class 27s were actually outlived by the older Class 26s, whose less powerful engines were more reliable.

== Sub-classes ==
- 27/0: Locomotives as built with steam heating (excluding 27024–27031)
- 27/1: Locomotives converted in 1971–1973 for push pull operation, renumbered back to 27/0 after conversion starting in 1982.
- 27/2: Locomotives converted in 1973–1976 with Electric Train Heat, renumbered back to 27/0 after conversion starting in 1982.

== Edinburgh-Glasgow push-pull operation ==
By the late 1960s, the Swindon-built inter-city DMUs operating the Edinburgh Waverley - Glasgow Queen Street express service were becoming unreliable. In 1970, the decision was made to replace them with locomotive-hauled carriages. So between 1971 and 1973, twenty-four Class 27s were fitted-up with dual (vacuum and air) brakes and reclassified Class 27/1, while 36 Mark 2 carriages (7 brake second opens, 22 open seconds and 7 corridor firsts) swapped their vacuum-operated shoe brakes for air-operated disc brakes and were though-wired with Blue Star control cables to enable top and tail push-pull working. It was later decided that as the Mark 2 stock was dual (steam or electric) heated, to convert half the 27/1 fleet to electric train heat, by replacing the train heating boiler with a Deutz 8-cylinder, air-cooled diesel engine and alternator. The conversions were then classified as Class 27/2 and were used on one end of the train, with a 27/1 on the other.

The very intensive 90 mph (140 km/h) push-pull service was demanding on the locomotives and reliability started to suffer. The 27/2s appeared prone to fire damage, especially from their electric train heating alternators. The push-pull sets were replaced in 1979 by single Class 47/7s at one end of a rake of Mark 2 carriages and a DBSO. The Class 27/1s and 27/2s were then renumbered to 27/0 and could often be found on Edinburgh-Dundee semi-fast passenger services, until their replacement, briefly by Class 101 and subsequently by Class 150 Sprinter diesel multiple units (DMUs) in 1987, whilst the remainder were largely used on freight.

== Accidents and incidents ==
- On 30 June 1962, locomotive D5386 was in a minor collision with a diesel multiple unit at Cricklewood carriage sidings, due to confusion over a hand signal. The engine is now preserved and stored at Barrow Hill Roundhouse.
- On 25 August 1965, locomotive D5383 was heading a freight train that collided with the rear on another freight train at East Langton; Leicestershire. It was taken to Derby Works for evaluation, but was withdrawn in January the following year.
- Locomotive 27 044 was severely damaged by fire before 5 September 1980. It was consequently withdrawn and scrapped.

== Fleet list ==
Table of locomotives
Original D-series No.	First TOPS No.	Second TOPS No.	Third TOPS No.	BRCW serial No.	Date built	Date withdrawn	Notes
D5347	27001	—	—	DEL190	Jun 1961	Jul 1987	Preserved
D5348	27002	—	—	DEL191	Jul 1961	Jan 1986	
D5349	27003	—	—	DEL192	Jul 1961	Jan 1987	
D5350	27004	—	—	DEL193	Aug 1961	May 1986	
D5351	27005	—	—	DEL194	Aug 1961	Jul 1987	Preserved
D5352	27006	—	—	DEL195	Sep 1961	Jan 1976	
D5353	27007	—	—	DEL196	Sep 1961	Jan 1985	Preserved
D5354	27008	—	—	DEL197	Sep 1961	Aug 1987	
D5355	27009	—	—	DEL198	Sep 1961	Jul 1980	Withdrawn due to fire damage
D5356	27010	—	—	DEL199	Oct 1961	Apr 1986	
D5357	27011	—	—	DEL200	Oct 1961	Mar 1981	
D5358	27012	—	—	DEL201	Oct 1961	May 1986	
D5359	27013	—	—	DEL202	Nov 1961	Jul 1976	
D5360	27014	—	—	DEL203	Nov 1961	Sep 1986	
D5361	27015	—	—	DEL204	Nov 1961	Jan 1977	Withdrawn due to accident damage
D5362	27016	—	—	DEL205	Nov 1961	Apr 1984	
D5363	27017	—	—	DEL206	Dec 1961	May 1986	
D5364	27018	—	—	DEL207	Dec 1961	May 1986	
D5365	27019	—	—	DEL208	Dec 1961	May 1984	
D5366	27020	—	—	DEL209	Jan 1962	Apr 1986	
D5367	27021	—	—	DEL210	Jan 1962	Jun 1985	
D5368	27022	—	—	DEL211	Jan 1962	Jan 1985	
D5369	27023	—	—	DEL212	Jan 1962	May 1986	
D5370	27024	ADB968028	—	DEL213	Jan 1962	Jul 1987	Preserved
D5371	27025	—	—	DEL214	Jan 1962	Jun 1987	
D5372	27026	—	—	DEL215	Jan 1962	Jul 1987	
D5373	27027	—	—	DEL216	Jan 1962	Jun 1983	
D5374	27101	27045	—	DEL217	Feb 1962	May 1986	
D5375	27028	—	—	DEL218	Feb 1962	Aug 1984	
D5376	27029	—	—	DEL219	Feb 1962	Jan 1986	
D5377	27030	—	—	DEL220	Feb 1962	Apr 1986	
D5378	27031	—	—	DEL221	Mar 1962	May 1978	Withdrawn due to fire damage
D5379	27032	—	—	DEL222	Mar 1962	May 1985	
D5380	27102	27046	—	DEL223	Apr 1962	Jul 1987	
D5381	27033	—	—	DEL224	Apr 1962	Feb 1986	
D5382	27034	—	—	DEL225	Apr 1962	Jul 1984	
D5383	—	—	—	DEL226	Apr 1962	Jan 1966	Withdrawn due to accident damage at East Langton, 20 August 1965
D5384	27035	—	—	DEL227	May 1962	Sep 1976	
D5385	27036	—	—	DEL228	May 1962	Apr 1986	
D5386	27103	27212 (Note: Webb gives DEL256 as being numbered D5413, 27 118, 27 212)	27066	DEL229	May 1962	Jul 1987	Preserved
D5387	27104	27048	—	DEL230	May 1962	May 1986	
D5388	27105	27049	—	DEL231	May 1962	Apr 1987	
D5389	27037	—	—	DEL232	May 1962	Mar 1986	
D5390	27038	—	—	DEL233	Jun 1962	Feb 1987	
D5391	27119	27201	—	DEL234	Jun 1962	Jan 1979	
D5392	27120	27202	—	DEL235	Jun 1962	Aug 1980	Withdrawn due to fire damage
D5393	27121	27203	27057	DEL236	Jun 1962	May 1985	
D5394	27106	27050	—	DEL237	Jun 1962	Jul 1987	Preserved
D5395	27107	27051	—	DEL238	Jun 1962	Jul 1987	
D5396	27108	27052	—	DEL239	Jun 1962	Jul 1987	
D5397	27109	27053	—	DEL240	Aug 1962	May 1987	
D5398	27039	—	—	DEL241	Jul 1962	Oct 1975	
D5399	27110	27054	—	DEL242	Jul 1962	Jul 1987	
D5400	27111	27055	—	DEL243	Jul 1962	Jul 1987	
D5401	27112	27056	—	DEL244	Jul 1962	Feb 1987	Preserved
D5402	27040	—	—	DEL245	Jul 1962	Jan 1986	
D5403	27122	27204	27058	DEL246	Jul 1962	May 1986	
D5404	27113	27207	27061	DEL247	Jul 1962	May 1986	
D5405	27041	—	—	DEL248	Jul 1962	May 1986	
D5406	27042	—	—	DEL249	Jul 1962	May 1987	
D5407	27114	27208	27062	DEL250	Aug 1962	Feb 1986	
D5408	27115	27209	27063	DEL251	Aug 1962	Jul 1987	
D5409	27116	27210	27064	DEL252	Aug 1962	May 1986	27116 allocated, but never carried
D5410	27123	27205	27059	DEL253	Aug 1962	Jul 1987	Preserved
D5411	27117	27211	27065	DEL254	Sep 1962	May 1986	
D5412	27124	27206	27060	DEL255	Sep 1962	Mar 1986	
D5413	27118	27103	27047	DEL256	Sep 1962	Apr 1986	
D5414	27043	—	—	DEL257	Sep 1962	Apr 1980	Withdrawn due to fire damage
D5415	27044	—	—	DEL258	Oct 1962	Jul 1980	Withdrawn due to fire damage

== Preserved locomotives ==
Eight examples of the class have been preserved at various heritage railways in Great Britain.

Two members of this class were rescued from Vic Berry's Scrapyard in the 1980s:

- D5410/27059 in September 1987
- D5401/27056 in October 1987.

Numbers (current in bold)				Livery	Location	Image	Condition
D5347	**27001**			BR Blue	Bo'ness and Kinneil Railway		Fully operational
D5351	**27005**			BR Blue	Bo'ness and Kinneil Railway		Stored, awaiting restoration
**D5353**	27007			BR Green	Caledonian Railway (Brechin)		Stored, awaiting restoration
**D5370**	27024	ADB968028		BR Green (with yellow warning panels)	Caledonian Railway (Brechin)		Serviceable
D5386	27103	27212	**27066**	BR Blue	Barrow Hill Roundhouse		Stored, Running
**D5394**	27106	27050		BR Green (no yellow warning panels)	Strathspey Railway		Serviceable
D5401	27112	**27056**		BR Blue	Great Central Railway		Under Repairs
**D5410**	27123	27205	27059	BR Green	UK Rail Leasing, Leicester		Under Restoration

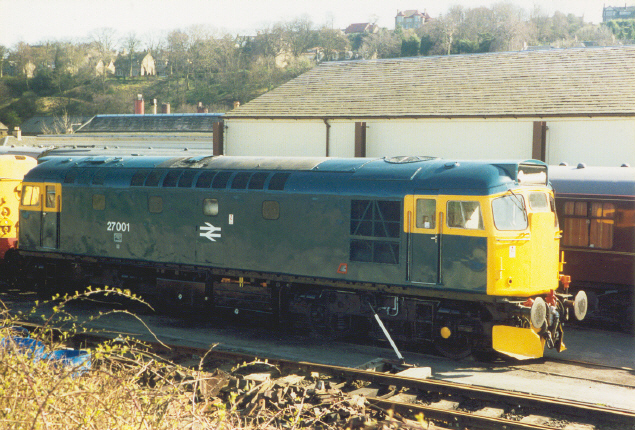
27001 at the Bo'ness and Kinneil Railway

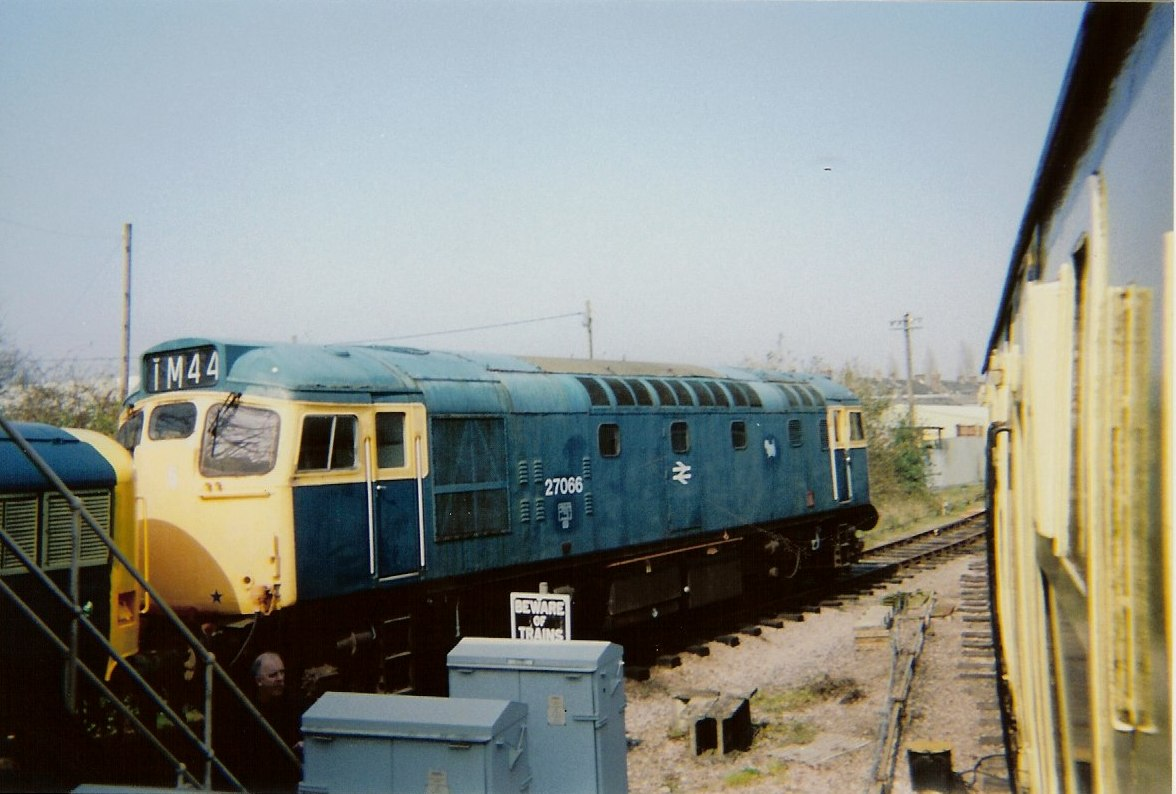
27066 on the Dean Forest Railway

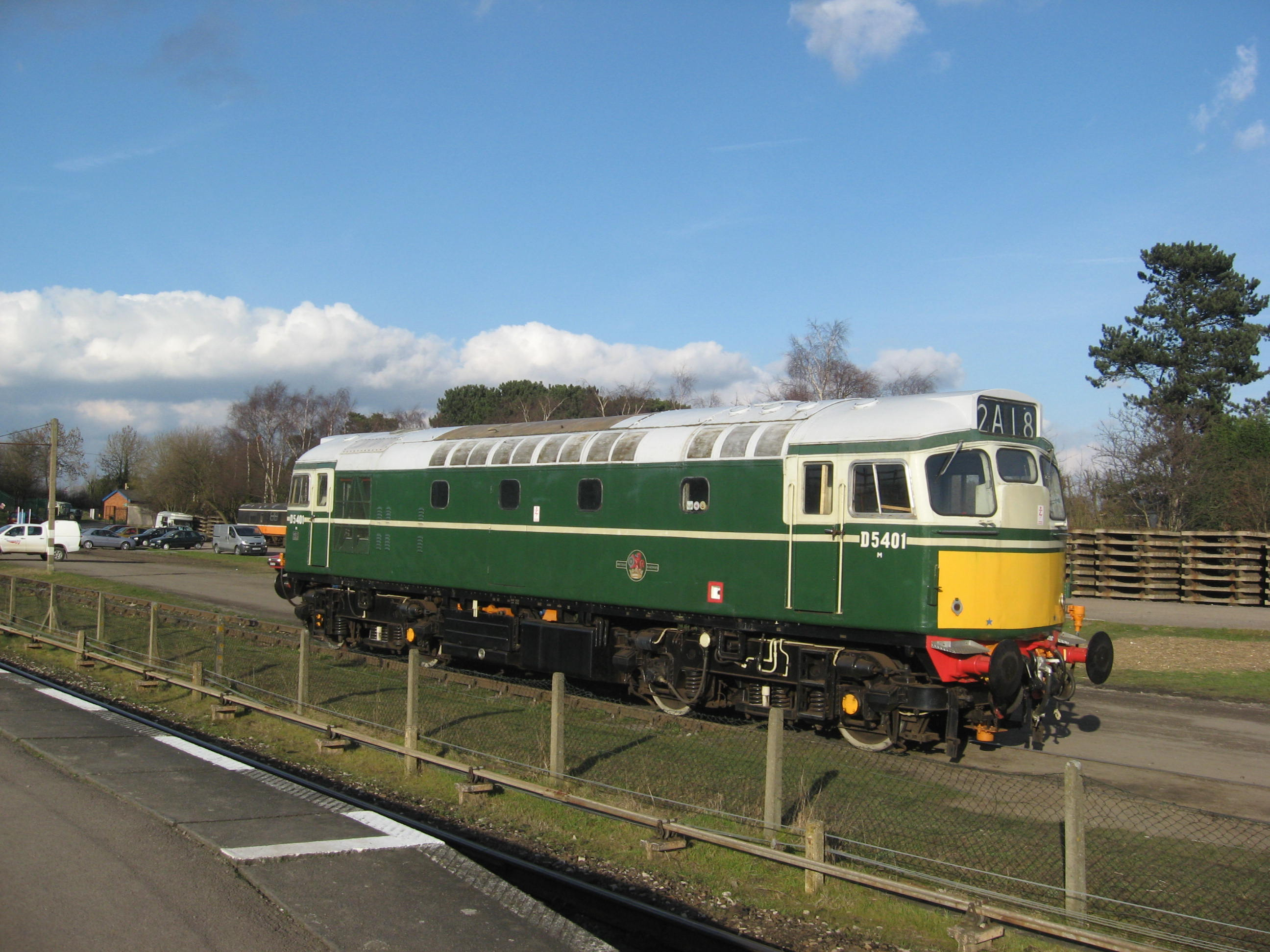
D5401 (27056) at the Great Central Railway

== Model railways ==
During the 1980s, Minitrix produced Class 27 models in British N gauge. In 2013, Dapol introduced DCC-ready models of 27032 in BR blue and D5356 in BR green, also in British N gauge.

Like the Class 26, both Lima and Heljan have produced models of the Class 27 in OO gauge.
