= British Rail Class 26 =

Class of 47 Bo′Bo′ 1160hp diesel-electric locomotives

BRCW Type 2 British Rail Class 26
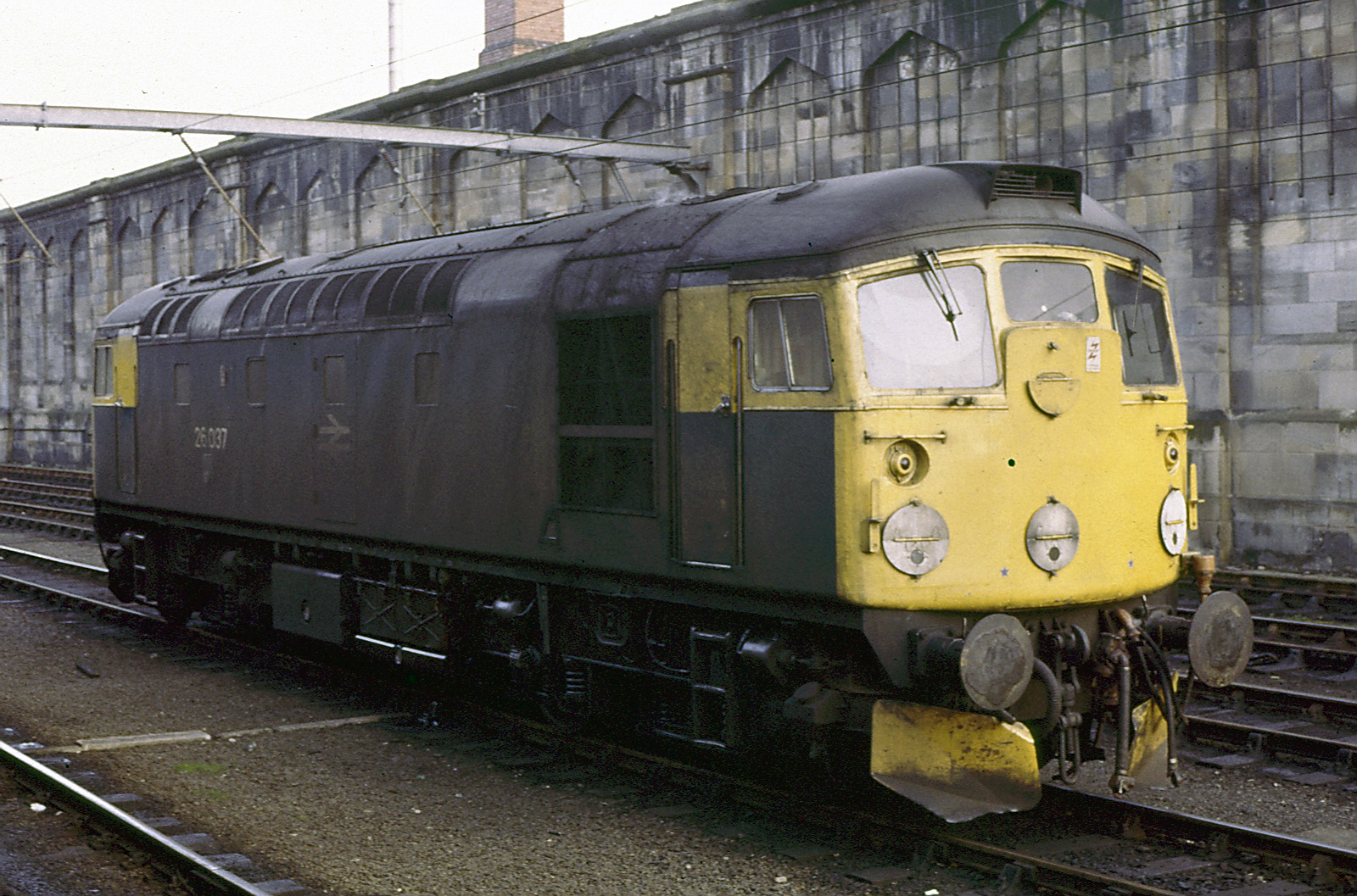
- 26037 at Carlisle in 1987
Type and origin
- Power type: Diesel-electric
- Builder: Birmingham Railway Carriage and Wagon Company
- Serial number: DEL45–DEL91
- Build date: 1958–1959
- Total produced: 47
Specifications
- Configuration
  - UIC: Bo'Bo'
  - Commonwealth: Bo-Bo
- Gauge: 4 ft 8 1/2 in (1,435 mm) standard gauge
- Wheel diameter: 3 ft 7 in (1.092 m)
- Minimum curve: 5 chains (100 m)
- Wheelbase: 39 ft 0 in (11.89 m)
- Length: 50 ft 9 in (15.47 m)
- Width: 8 ft 10 in (2.69 m)
- Height: 12 ft 8 in (3.86 m)
- Loco weight: D5300–D5319: 77.5 long tons (78.7 t; 86.8 short tons); D5320–D5346: 74 long tons (75.2 t; 82.9 short tons)
- Fuel capacity: 500 imp gal (2,300 L; 600 US gal)
- Prime mover: Sulzer 6LDA28-A
- Generator: DC
- Traction motors: four Crompton Parkinson DC traction motors
- Transmission: Diesel electric
- MU working: ★ Blue Star
- Train heating: Steam (when fitted)
- Train brakes: Originally vacuum only, all converted to air and vacuum (dual braked)
Performance figures
- Maximum speed: 80 mph (130 km/h)
- Power output: Engine: 1,160 hp (865 kW) @750 rpm At rail: 900 hp (671 kW)
- Tractive effort: Maximum: 42,000 lbf (187 kN); Continuous: 30,000 lbf (133 kN)
- Brakeforce: 35 long tons-force (350 kN)
Career
- Operators: British Railways
- Numbers: D5300–D5346; later 26001–26046
- Axle load class: D5300–D5319: Route availability 6 D5320–D5346: Route availability 5
- First run: 1958
- Withdrawn: 1972 (1), 1975–1994
- Disposition: 13 preserved, remainder scrapped

The British Rail Class 26 diesel locomotives, also known as the BRCW Type 2, were built by the Birmingham Railway Carriage and Wagon Company (BRCW) at Smethwick in 1958–59. Forty seven examples were built and the last were withdrawn from service in 1994. Like their higher-powered sisters, the BRCW Classes 27 and 33, they had all-steel bodies and cab ends with fibreglass cab roofs. They were numbered D5300-D5346.

== Origins ==
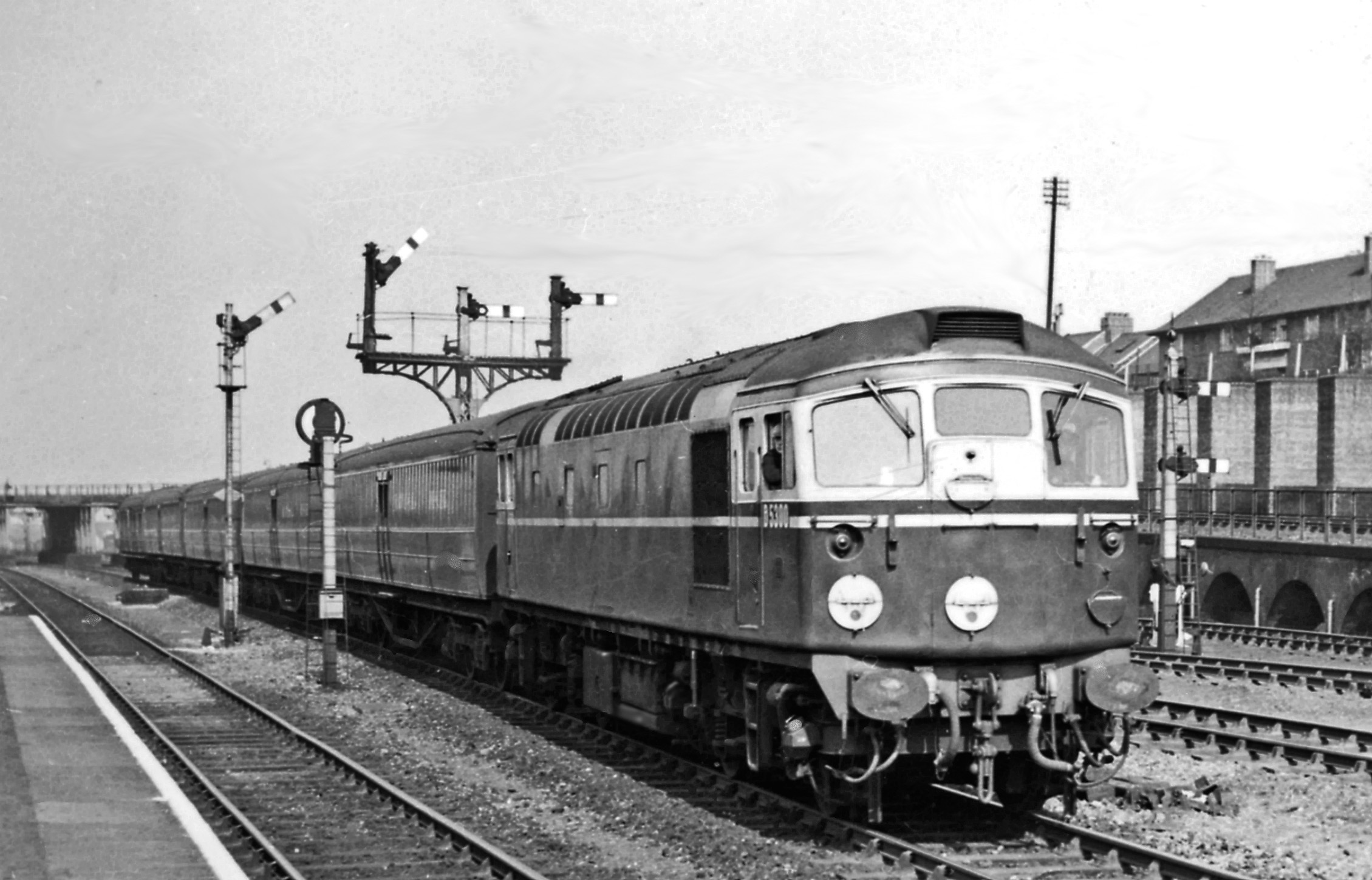
The first of the class (D5300) at Harringay in 1959, wearing original livery

The British Rail Modernisation Plan contained a large requirement for small diesel locomotives in the 800 hp (600 kW) - 1,250 hp (930 kW) range and under BR's 'Pilot Scheme', small batches of locomotives were ordered from numerous different manufacturers for evaluation. BRCW obtained an order for 20 mixed traffic diesel-electric locomotives powered by 1,160 hp (870 kW) Sulzer 6LDA28 engines.

The Birmingham Railway Carriage and Wagon Company (BRCW) was a rolling stock manufacturer, although they were building diesel multiple units for British Railways (BR). The first standalone locomotives made by the company were produced in 1956-57, 12 diesel locomotives for the Irish railways Córas Iompair Éireann (CIE 101 Class); the order went to BRCW due to capacity problems at CIÉ's own Inchicore Works. A partnership was established between BRCW and the Swiss diesel engine manufacturers Sulzer Brothers at that time.

The Sulzer LDA28 range was found to be particularly suited to BR's needs. In addition to BRCW's Class 26, the 1,160 hp 6LDA28 variant was also used in BR's own Class 24 design, while the 1,250 hp 6LDA28-B was fitted in the later BRCW Class 27 and BR Class 25.

== Work history ==
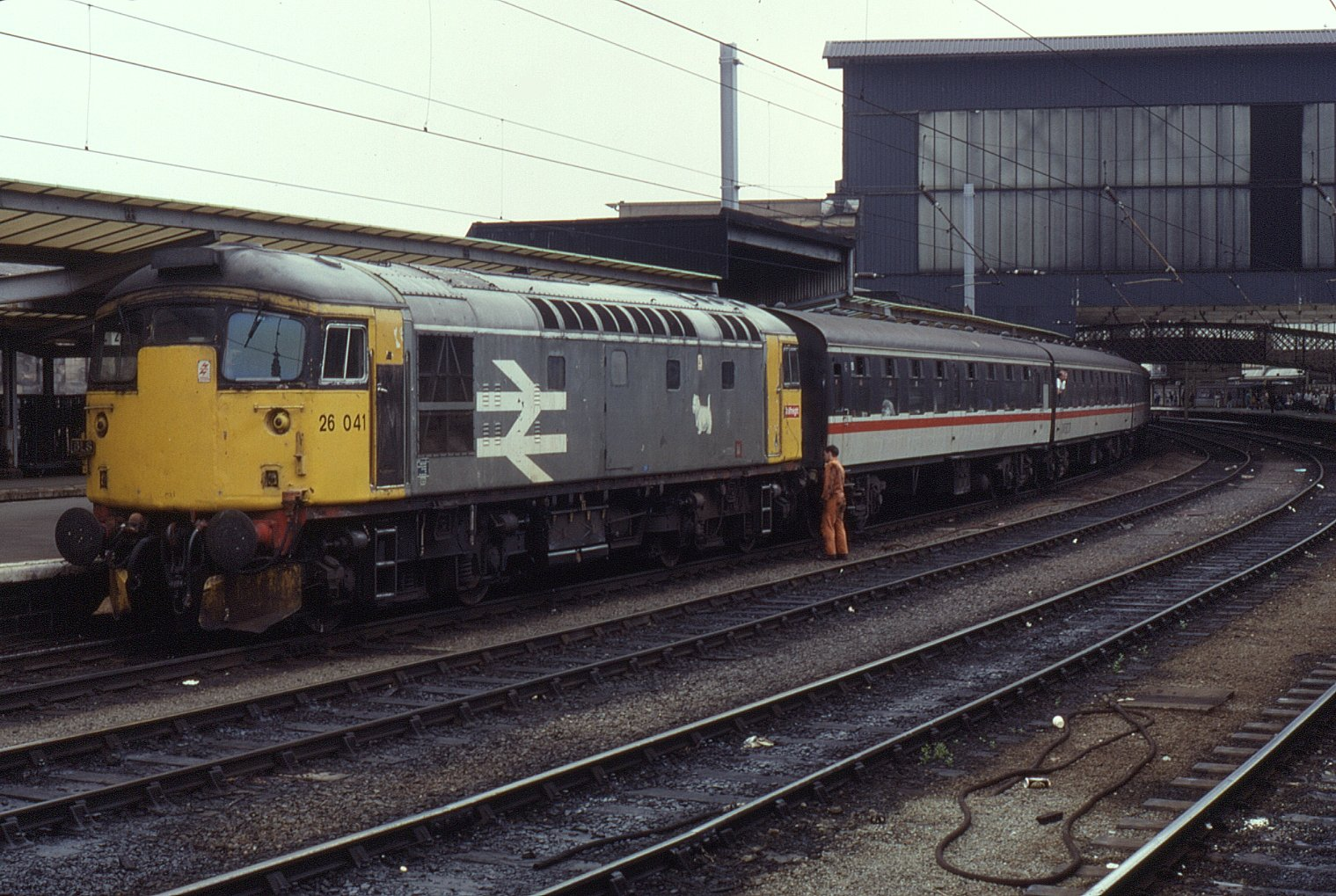
26041 at Carlisle in 1991

Distribution of locomotives, March 1974
British Rail Class 26 is located in Scotland
Code	Name	Quantity
HA	Haymarket	27
IS	Inverness	19
Withdrawn (1972)		1
Total built:		47

The Pilot Scheme batch of twenty locomotives (D5300-5319, Class 26/0) were delivered to Hornsey TMD (Traction Maintenance Depot) on the Eastern Region of British Railways between July 1958 and March 1959. They were used on a variety of duties, notably including London commuter services into King's Cross station and were evaluated against designs from the North British Locomotive Company, English Electric, Brush Traction and British Railways' own works. Their allocation was switched to the new Finsbury Park TMD when it opened in 1960.

Locomotive D5303 was on loan to the Scottish Region from 1958, being operated briefly from Inverness TMD and Eastfield TMD before moving to Leith Central TMD. This was the precursor to a further twenty seven locomotives of a slightly modified design (D5320-5346, Class 26/1) being delivered to the Scottish Region between April and October 1959. The first two of these locomotives were briefly allocated to Leith Central, but subsequently all of the Scottish batch were based at Haymarket TMD (although some went to Hornsey on loan for a time).

By the middle of 1960, evaluation of the various Type 2 designs was complete and it was decided to concentrate all of the Class 26s in Scotland. As a result, the Class 26/0s were transferred to Haymarket, displacing the Class 26/1s to Inverness. Although some transferring of individual locomotives between the two depots occurred, the type was then allocated entirely to Haymarket and Inverness until 1987, apart from the brief allocation of a few locomotives to Kittybrewster TMD and Dundee TMD during 1960.

Like other Scottish Region Type 2s, Class 26 could be found on a wide variety of duties during the 1960s and '70s. The Inverness-based examples were particularly associated with the Far North Line and Kyle of Lochalsh Line, as well as operating south of Inverness on the Highland Main Line. One notable duty, shared with locally based Class 24s, was to operate The Royal Highlander Inverness to London Euston sleeping car express as far south as Perth, a demanding turn which required three locomotives working in multiple. The Haymarket engines were latterly more associated with goods traffic, and the first seven locomotives (D5300-5306, later renumbered 26007, 26001–006) were given slow speed control apparatus in 1967 for use on Merry-go-round (MGR) coal trains to the then new Cockenzie Power Station.

Upon elimination of BR standard-gauge steam traction in 1968, the 'D' number prefix was removed and locomotives D5300-5346 became 5300–5346. In 1974, the TOPS numbering system was implemented and Class 26/0s 5300-5319 were renumbered 26007/1-6/20/08-19, while Class 26/1s 5320-7/9-46 became 26028/1-7/9-46. Number 5328 had been withdrawn in 1972 with accident damage.

The availability of surplus Classes 37 and 47 locomotives in the late 1970s and early 1980s displaced the Class 26s from passenger workings and from most goods traffic north of Inverness. However, the type continued to operate goods trains throughout the whole of Scotland, taking over duties previously carried out by Class 25 and 27 locomotives. Most of the class were refurbished in the 1980s to extend their lives, being chosen in preference to the newer Class 25 and 27 due to the better reliability of the Class 26s' lower powered engines.

In May 1987, all of the surviving Class 26s were transferred to Eastfield TMD, except the seven MGR examples which remained at Haymarket until transfer in May 1988. In August 1992, the remaining engines were reallocated to Inverness, although this was essentially a paper exercise as locomotives only returned to their home depot for major maintenance. By this time, the service life of the Class 26 locomotives was coming to an end.

=== Withdrawals ===
The first withdrawal, 5328, occurred as a result of accident damage in 1972. Although the Class 26s were a capable and reliable type, there was a surplus of small diesel locomotives, thus any unit suffering significant damage was at risk for withdrawal. A further six locomotives were removed by minor accidents or engine fires between 1975 and 1984. Apart from these, routine withdrawals commenced with three Class 26/0s in 1977, followed by two 26/0s and 26/1s each in 1985.

The surviving 33 locomotives were all refurbished examples, and it had originally been intended to keep them in service until around 2000. However, three were lost to minor accidents/fire damage in 1988–89 and the closure of Ravenscraig steelworks in 1991 resulted in a surplus of locomotives. Routine withdrawal of the refurbished locomotives began in 1990 and the last examples were taken out of service in October 1993.

=== Liveries ===
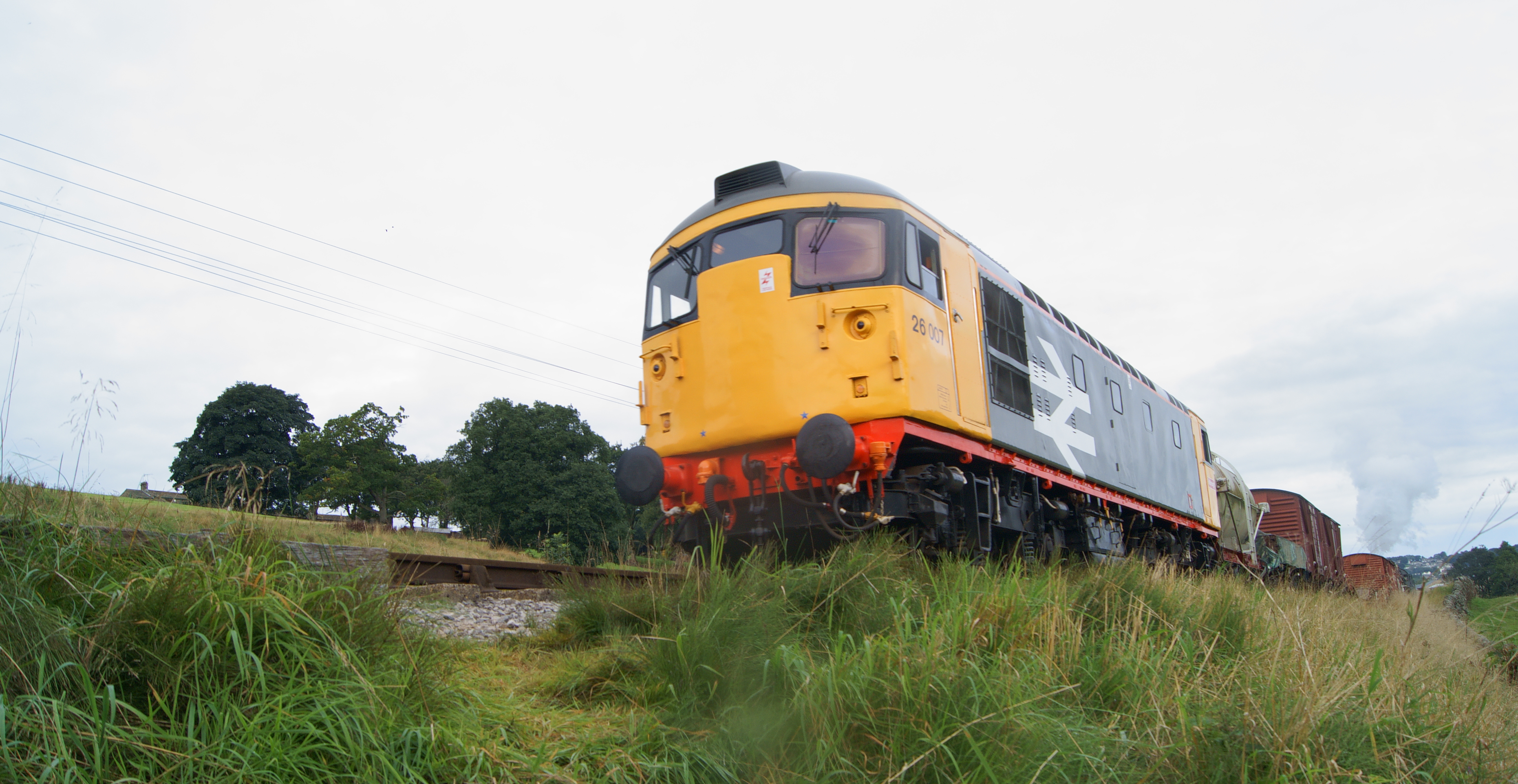
Restored 26007 on the Keighley & Worth Valley Railway, 2021

Nine main livery variants were carried by the class whilst in BR service:

- British Railways green, with grey roofs, white cab window surrounds and a thin white stripe midway up the bodysides. All locomotives were delivered in this livery;
- Within a few years, all locomotives received small yellow warning panels on the lower cabfronts;
- From the late 1960s, some locomotives received full yellow ends as an interim measure pending repainting into Rail Blue;
- From 1967, repainted locomotives received all-over Rail Blue with full yellow ends;
- This was soon modified to include yellow cabside window surrounds. All locomotives had received this livery by the mid-'70s;
- Railfreight grey with yellow cabs, black cab window surrounds and red solebars. Nineteen locomotives repainted in 1985-87 received this livery (26001-8/10/25/6/31/2/4/5/7/8/40/1);
- Railfreight three-tone grey with black cab window surrounds, yellow lower cabsides and yellow/black 'Coal sub-sector' markings. This livery was applied to eight locomotives repainted in 1988-89 (26001-8);
- Civil Link (or Dutch) grey with yellow upper bodysides and lower cabfronts, and black cab window surrounds was applied to fourteen locomotives (26001-5/7/11/25/6/35/6/8/40/3) in 1990–92;
- To mark the impending withdrawal of the class, the first two locomotives (26007 and 26001) were repainted into 1960s style BR green with small yellow warning panels in 1992. 26001 became the first and only member of the class to be named (Eastfield, to commemorate the closure of that depot).

== Preservation ==
Thirteen locomotives have been preserved: eight in Scotland, four in England and one in Wales.

Numbers (current in bold)		Name	Image	Livery	Location	Notes
D5300	**26007**	-		Railfreight Coal	Barrow Hill Engine Shed	First-built locomotive. One of the final locomotives in traffic. fully operational
**D5301**	26001	-		BR Green	Caledonian Railway	One of the final locomotives in traffic. Stored.
**D5302**	26002	-		BR Green	Undisclosed location in Scotland	Moved from a private site near the Caledonian Railway in Brechin in 2025 to a nearby undisclosed location.
D5304	**26004**	-		Railfreight Coal	Nemesis Rail, Burton upon Trent	Stored
**D5310**	26010	-		Plain BR Green with full yellow ends	Llangollen Railway	Operational following traction motor overhaul
D5311	**26011**	-		BR Blue	Nemesis Rail, Burton upon Trent	Stored
**D5314**	26014	-		BR Green	Caledonian Railway	Operational
D5324	**26024**	-		BR Blue	Bo'ness and Kinneil Railway	Stored
**D5325**	26025	-		BR Green	Undisclosed location in Scotland	Moved from a private site near the Caledonian Railway in Brechin in 2025 to a nearby undisclosed location.
D5335	**26035**	-		BR Blue	Caledonian Railway	Stored
D5338	**26038**	Tom Clift 1954 - 2012		BR Blue	Bo'ness and Kinneil Railway	Undergoing generator repairs.
D5340	**26040**	-		BR Blue	Private site near Carlisle	Moved from the Whitrope Heritage Centre in 2025.
D5343	**26043**	-		BR Blue	Gloucestershire Warwickshire Railway	Operational

== Models ==
Both Lima and Heljan have produced models of the Class 26 in a number of different liveries.
