= North British Type 2 =

North British Type 2 may refer to:

- British Rail Class 21, a type of diesel-electric locomotive built between 1958 and 1960
- British Rail Class 22, a type of diesel-hydraulic locomotive built between 1959 and 1962
- British Rail Class 29, a type of re-engined Class 21 locomotive built between 1963 and 1967
