= Class 41 =

Class 41 or 41 class may refer to:

- DRG Class 41, a Deutsche Reichsbahn German steam locomotive type
- British Rail Class 41 (Warship Class), prototype diesel locomotives
- British Rail Class 41 (HST) - prototype High Speed Train power cars
- Belgian Railways Class 41, diesel multiple units
- New South Wales 41 class locomotive, electric locomotives
