= USS Cyclone =

1992 Cyclone-class patrol ship

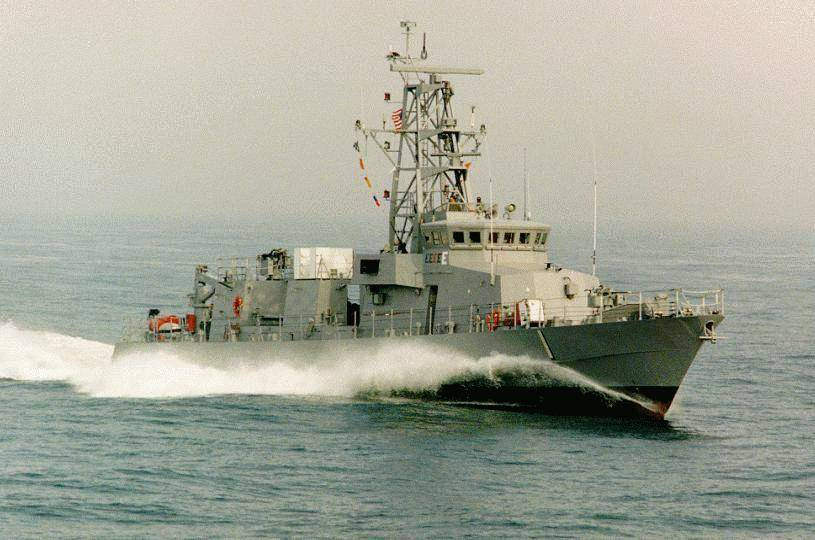
- USS Cyclone underway.

History

United States
- Name: Cyclone
- Namesake: Cyclone
- Ordered: 1 August 1990
- Builder: Bollinger Shipyards, Lockport, Louisiana
- Cost: $25.69 million
- Laid down: 22 June 1991
- Launched: 1 February 1992
- Sponsored by: Betty LeMoyne
- Commissioned: 7 August 1993
- Decommissioned: 28 February 2000
- Stricken: 28 February 2000
- Identification: Hull symbol: PC-1; Call sign: NYOE
- Fate: Transferred to the United States Coast Guard, 29 February 2000
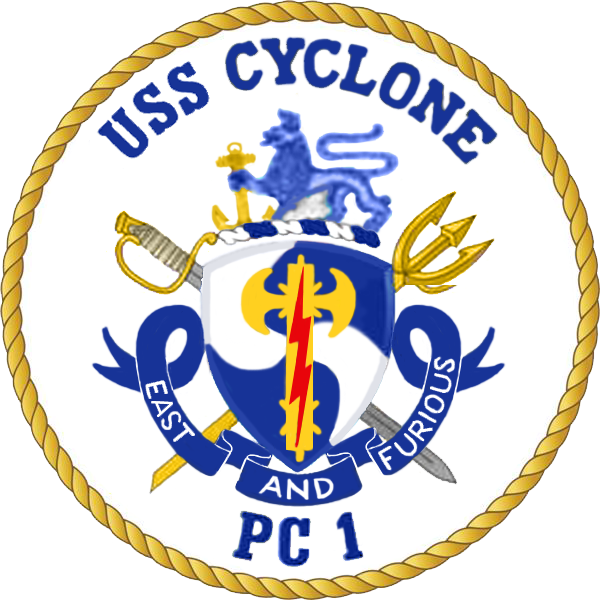
- Badge

United States
- Name: Cyclone
- Acquired: 29 February 2000
- Commissioned: 29 February 2000
- Decommissioned: 2004
- Identification: Hull symbol: WPC-1
- Fate: Transferred to the Philippine Navy, 8 March 2004

Philippines
- Name: General Mariano Alvarez
- Namesake: Mariano Álvarez
- Acquired: 8 March 2004
- Identification: Hull symbol: PS-38, later PS-176
- Status: in active service

General characteristics
- Class & type: Cyclone-class patrol ship
- Displacement: 328.5 long tons (333.8 t) (light load); 331 long tons (336 t) (full load)
- Length: 170 ft (52 m); 179 ft (55 m) (refit)
- Beam: 25 ft (7.6 m)
- Draft: 7.5 ft (2.3 m)
- Installed power: 13,400 shp (10,000 kW)
- Propulsion: 4 × Paxman marine Diesel engines; 4 × shafts
- Speed: 35 kn (65 km/h; 40 mph)
- Complement: 4 officers; 24 enlisted; 8 special forces
- Sensors & processing systems: Sperry Vision 2100M integrated navigation/combat system
- Electronic warfare & decoys: 1 × MK 52 chaff launcher
- Armament: 2 × 25 mm (0.98 in) MK 38 "Bushmaster" chain gun (Aft mount removed in refit); 2 × 40 mm (1.6 in) MK 19 grenade launchers; 2 × .50 in (12.7 mm) caliber machine guns; 6 × FIM-92 Stinger SAMs; 1 × Mk96 25 mm cannon/40mm grenade launcher (Refit)

USS Cyclone (PC-1) was the first of the Navy's Cyclone-class coastal patrol ships. As the lead ship of her class, Cyclone served as the test bed for this series of 14 vessels.

== Construction ==
Cyclone was laid down at Bollinger Shipyards, in Lockport, Louisiana, on 22 June 1991; and sponsored by Ms. Betty LeMoyne, wife of Deputy Commander-in-Chief and Chief of Staff, U.S. Special Operations Command, Rear Admiral Irve C. LeMoyne.

Originally scheduled to be commissioned on 1 May 1993, Cyclone incurred damage in collision with the steamship Robert E. Lee on 12 March, that required a ten-week yard period and delayed the ship's commissioning into the summer. Consequently, Cyclone was commissioned at the U.S. Naval Academy in Annapolis, Maryland, on 7 August 1993, Lieutenant Commander Randall L. Johnson in command.

== History ==
The primary mission of Cyclone was to serve as a platform for maritime special operations, including interdiction, escort, non-combatant evacuation, reconnaissance, operational deception, intelligence collection, and tactical swimmer operations. Her small size, stealthy construction, and high speed were tailored to performing long-range Special Operations Forces (SOF) insertion and extraction and other SOF support duties.

The ship's operational capabilities were designed to meet the unique requirements of its Special Warfare missions. Cyclone was capable of accelerating from stop to 35 knots (65 km/h) in under three minutes, then move from full ahead to 15 knots (28 km/h) astern in 60 seconds. In high-speed, hard-over turns, the ship barely heeled as the automatic stabilizers engaged.

Cyclone was originally armed with two Mk38 25mm chain guns fore and aft, several pintle mounts for attaching .50 caliber machine guns or Mk 19 grenade launchers, and a position for launching Stinger shoulder-fired SAMs. She and others of her class were upgraded by replacing the after Mk38 mount with the new Mk96 platform which combines a 25 mm chain gun and a 40 mm grenade launcher on a single stabilized platform.

Commanding Officers under the U.S
7 Aug 1993	Lt. Comdr. Randall L. Johnson
7 Jul 1994	Lt. Mark S. Young
3 Jul 1996	Lt. Curtis J. Gilbert
29 Jun 1998	Lt. Calvin Slocumb

== Decommissioning and transfer ==
Cyclone had barely gone into service in the mid-1990s when the Special Operations Command rejected them as too big for commando missions, and the regular surface Navy dismissed them as too small for any of its missions. The Navy began looking for ways to phase out Cyclone and her sister ships, so on 28 February 2000, Cyclone was decommissioned and stricken from the Navy list.

She was then transferred to the United States Coast Guard the next day, being re-commissioned as the USCGC Cyclone (WPC 1). The Coast Guard lacked an effective vessel sized between its 110' patrol cutter and the 210' Medium Endurance Cutter, so there was considerable interest in Cyclone at first. However, her high operating costs were prohibitive and thus she sat largely inactive.

== Transferred ==
Cyclone was eventually sold under the Foreign Military Sales Program to the Philippine Navy on 8 March 2004, as part of a US military aid package to the Philippines, in an effort to bolster interdiction and counterterrorism capabilities. She was rechristened BRP Mariano Alvarez (PS-38), later BRP General Mariano Alvarez (PS-176), in honor of a revolutionary general in the Philippine war of independence against Spain.

== Bibliography ==
- Jones, Daniel A. (7 July 2015). "Cyclone (PC-1)". Dictionary of American Naval Fighting Ships. Naval History and Heritage Command. This article incorporates text from this source, which is in the public domain.
- "USCGC Cyclone (WPC 1) ex-USS Cyclone (PC 1)". NavSource.
