= Aberdeen Ferryhill TMD =

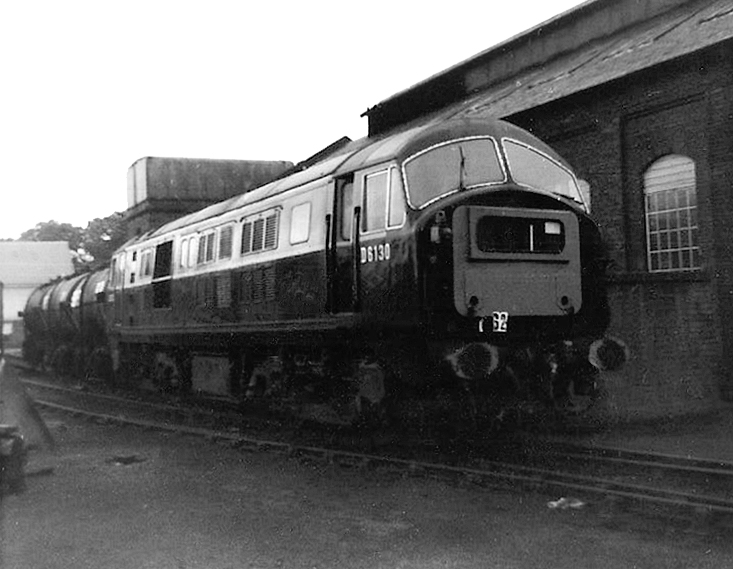
- A Class 29 outside Aberdeen Ferryhill Shed in 1966
- Interactive map of Aberdeen Ferryhill TMD

Location
- Location: Aberdeen, Scotland
- Coordinates: 57.1322°N 2.0988°W
- OS grid: NJ941045

Characteristics
- Depot code: AB (1973-)
- Type: Diesel

History
- BR region: Scottish Region
- Former depot code: 61B (1948-1973)

Aberdeen Ferryhill TMD was a railway traction maintenance depot in Aberdeen, Scotland. The depot was approximately 1 mi (1.6 km) south of Aberdeen railway station. The depot code originally assigned by British Railways was 61B, but it was given the code AB latterly. Ferryhill Depot closed on 6 December 1987. The adjacent turntable and associated former engine shed form part of the Ferryhill Railway Heritage Centre now preserving the site's heritage.

== History ==
In 1987 the depot had an allocation of Class 08 shunters. The depot also had two snowploughs. Other locomotives usually stabled at the depot included Classes 26, 27, 37 and 47.
