= Paxman Ventura =

Railway and maritime transport engine

Overview
- Manufacturer: Davey, Paxman & Co
- Designer: Geoffrey Bone
- Also called: YJ
- Production: 1960–1992

Layout
- Configuration: 60° vee: V6, V8, V12 or V16
- Displacement: V6: 39.42 litres (2,410 cu in); V8: 52.56 litres (3,210 cu in); V12: 78.84 litres (4,810 cu in); V16: 105.12 litres (6,410 cu in)
- Cylinder bore: 7.75 inches (197 mm)
- Piston stroke: 8.50 inches (216 mm)
- Cylinder block material: Cast iron
- Cylinder head material: Aluminium alloy
- Valvetrain: OHV, 4 per cylinder
- Compression ratio: 13:1

Combustion
- Operating principle: four-stroke turbo-charged high-speed diesel
- Fuel system: 2x CAV monobloc fuel injection pump (4x on V16), 11,500 psi (790 bar) (total) direct injection
- Fuel type: diesel

Output
- Power output: V12: 1,200–1,500 brake horsepower (890–1,120 kW; 1,200–1,500 PS) at 1,500 rpm V16: 1,600–1,870 brake horsepower (1,190–1,390 kW; 1,620–1,900 PS) at 1,500 rpm

Chronology
- Predecessor: Paxman YH, direct injection medium-speed diesel
- Successor: Paxman Valenta

The Paxman Ventura is an internal combustion diesel engine for railway locomotives, built by Davey, Paxman & Co.

The type YJ or Ventura was developed in the mid-1950s as Davey, Paxman's first high-speed diesel engine. With a view to the forthcoming modernisation and dieselisation of British Railways (BR), it was intended as a successor to Paxman's existing medium-speed engine, the direct injection YH. High-speed engines offered higher power-to-weight ratios, which in turn allowed locomotives to have a lower axle loading and greater route availability. The YJ was to have a weight of less than four tons for a 1,200 horsepower (890 kilowatts; 1,200 metric horsepower) V12, with versions of V6, V8, V12, and V16 configurations. Their construction and reliable use though required more sophisticated manufacture than previously, with better metallurgy and balancing of the moving parts for faster running and a stiffer crankcase to avoid vibration.

A total of 1098 engines were built by Paxman in Colchester, England (147 V6, 190 V8, 426 V12, and 335 V16); a further 37 were built under licence in Italy by Motori Breda of Milan for the D.343 Class locomotives of the Italian State Railways.

== Description ==
Like its medium-speed predecessor the Paxman YH, the Ventura is a 60° V engine with 6, 8, 12 or 16 cylinders. The engines are similar in many details, and broadly similar in capacity and power; their main differences are in their operating speed, the improvements necessary to achieve this, and the Ventura's resulting lighter weight.

The crankcase / cylinder block for MOD vessels were fabricated from steel by welding a mixture of steel castings and plate-work. This gives a more rigid structure than the YH's cast light alloy cylinder block. The aluminium alloy bed-frame of the YH and ZH engines had previously given trouble with cracking, and had to be replaced in the Class 17 with a cast iron frame, at Paxman's expense. Both engines have individual aluminium alloy cylinder heads for each cylinder. All other applications had cast iron crankcase / cylinder block. Centrifugally cast iron wet cylinder liners are used with aluminium alloy pistons in both. These pistons have three compression rings and two oil-control rings. The top ring is carried in a cast-iron insert. The combustion chamber of this direct injection engine is a toroidal recess in the piston crown.

The YJ engines were primarily developed for diesel electric locomotives (however Paxmans main design philosophy was maximum power for a given size and weight) and so their crankshafts have the unusual feature of an additional main bearing at the drive end, to help support the weight of the generator armature, where a single-bearing generator can be otherwise unsupported at one end. Fork and blade connecting rods are used, with the inner rod running on the outside of a shared bearing sleeve. There are four valves per cylinder, driven by pushrods and rockers from a single camshaft between the cylinder banks. The fuel injector is centrally mounted between the valves, and is supplied by a pair of inline CAV monobloc fuel injection pumps, one per bank (four injector pumps on V16). The single turbocharger is carried above the engine, with its axis longitudinal.

Smaller, single bank six- and eight-cylinder engines, the 6YJ and 8YJ, were derived from the V engine.

More than twenty V16 engines (16YJC) were supplied to the Air Ministry, used to power 11 kilovolt (kV) generating sets for the Linesman early warning radar system used by the Royal Air Force. The first batch were installed at locations including RAF Neatishead, RAF Staxton Wold, and RAF Boot Hill. A second batch was installed at RAF West Drayton; this controlled not only the entire RAF radar system, but also controlled the civilian radar as used by Heathrow Airport air traffic control.

Paxman licensed the Ventura design to ALCO, with a reciprocal agreement also permitting Paxman to build the popular ALCO 251. As an indication of the high power / weight ratio of the Ventura, this was around three times that of the 251.

== Use ==
V6 engine – 6YJ

- British Rail Class 14, 63 engines rated 650 brake horsepower (480 kilowatts) at 1,500 rpm.
- British Rail Class 74
- HM Customs and Excise, four engines supplied for HMRC Vigilant and HMRC Valiant twin-screw Revenue Cutters, rated at 590 shaft horsepower (440 kilowatts) at 1,300 rpm continuous, 755 shaft horsepower (563 kilowatts) at 1,500 rpm two hours.

V8 engine – 8YJ

- Royal Navy, 38 engines for Royal Navy frigates.
- Ceylon Government Railways, four engines.

V12 engine – 12YJ

- British Rail Class 29, re-engining of the licence-built MAN engines in the NBL Type 2 (Class 21) diesel-electrics.
- British Rail Class 42, two units fitted from new to D830 Majestic for comparison trials; units rated at 1,200 brake horsepower (890 kilowatts; 1,200 metric horsepower) and allied to normal Class 42 spec Mekydro transmissions.
- Royal Navy, HMS Hecate, HMS Hydra and HMS Hecla Hydrographic survey vessels (3 engines each for main propulsion, plus 2 each of 6YJ for power generation).
- Royal Navy, Type 22 frigate Batch 3, as a set of four generator sets.
- Ceylon Government Railways, 63 engines.

V16 engine – 16YJ

- Air Ministry, 21 engines for 11 kV generator sets for the Linesman early warning radar system used by the Royal Air Force.
- Royal Navy, Type 42 destroyer, as a set of four generator sets, each rated at 1 megawatt (1,400 metric horsepower; 1,300 brake horsepower).
- Royal Navy, Type 22 frigate Batch 1 and 2, as a set of four generator sets, each rated at 1 megawatt (1,400 metric horsepower; 1,300 brake horsepower).
- Royal Australian Navy, 51 engines for its Attack Class patrol boats.
- Ceylon Government Railways, 15 supplied (14 locos, +1 spare) 1,580 horsepower (1,180 kilowatts; 1,600 metric horsepower).
- Hungarian State Railways, single engine supplied for trials 1,870 horsepower (1,390 kilowatts; 1,900 metric horsepower)
