= BRP General Mariano Alvarez =

Philippine Navy coastal patrol ship

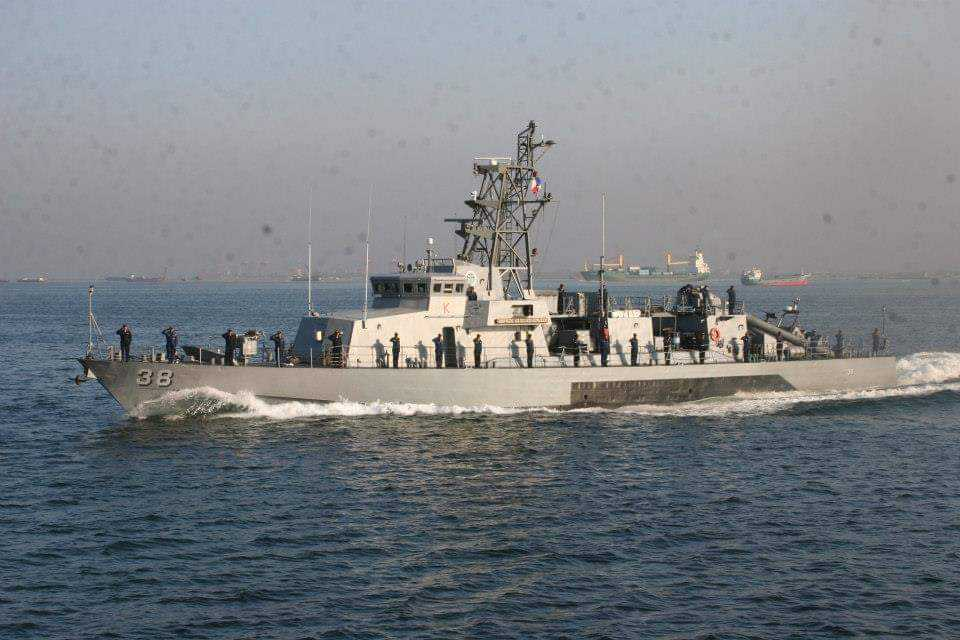
- BRP General Mariano Alvarez (PS-38) — January, 2013

History

United States
- Name: Cyclone
- Namesake: Cyclone
- Awarded: 1 August 1990
- Builder: Bollinger Shipyards, Lockport, Louisiana, U.S.
- Cost: US$25.69 million
- Laid down: 22 June 1991
- Launched: 1 February 1992
- Commissioned: 7 August 1993
- Decommissioned: 28 February 2000
- Stricken: 28 February 2000
- Identification: PC-1
- Motto: Fast and Furious
- Fate: Transferred to the U.S. Coast Guard on 29 February 2000. Transferred to Philippine Navy in 2004.
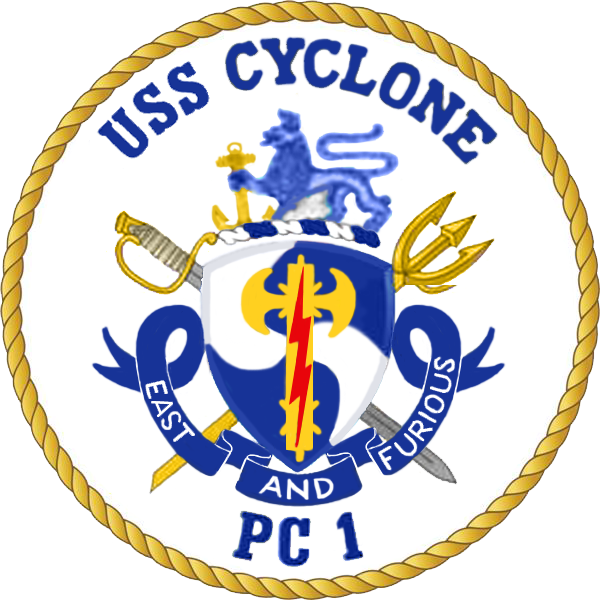
- Badge

Philippines
- Name: General Mariano Alvarez
- Namesake: Mariano Álvarez
- Operator: Philippine Navy
- Acquired: January 2004
- Commissioned: 8 March 2004
- Identification: PS-38 (March 2004–April 2024); PS-176 (April 2024–present )
- Status: In service
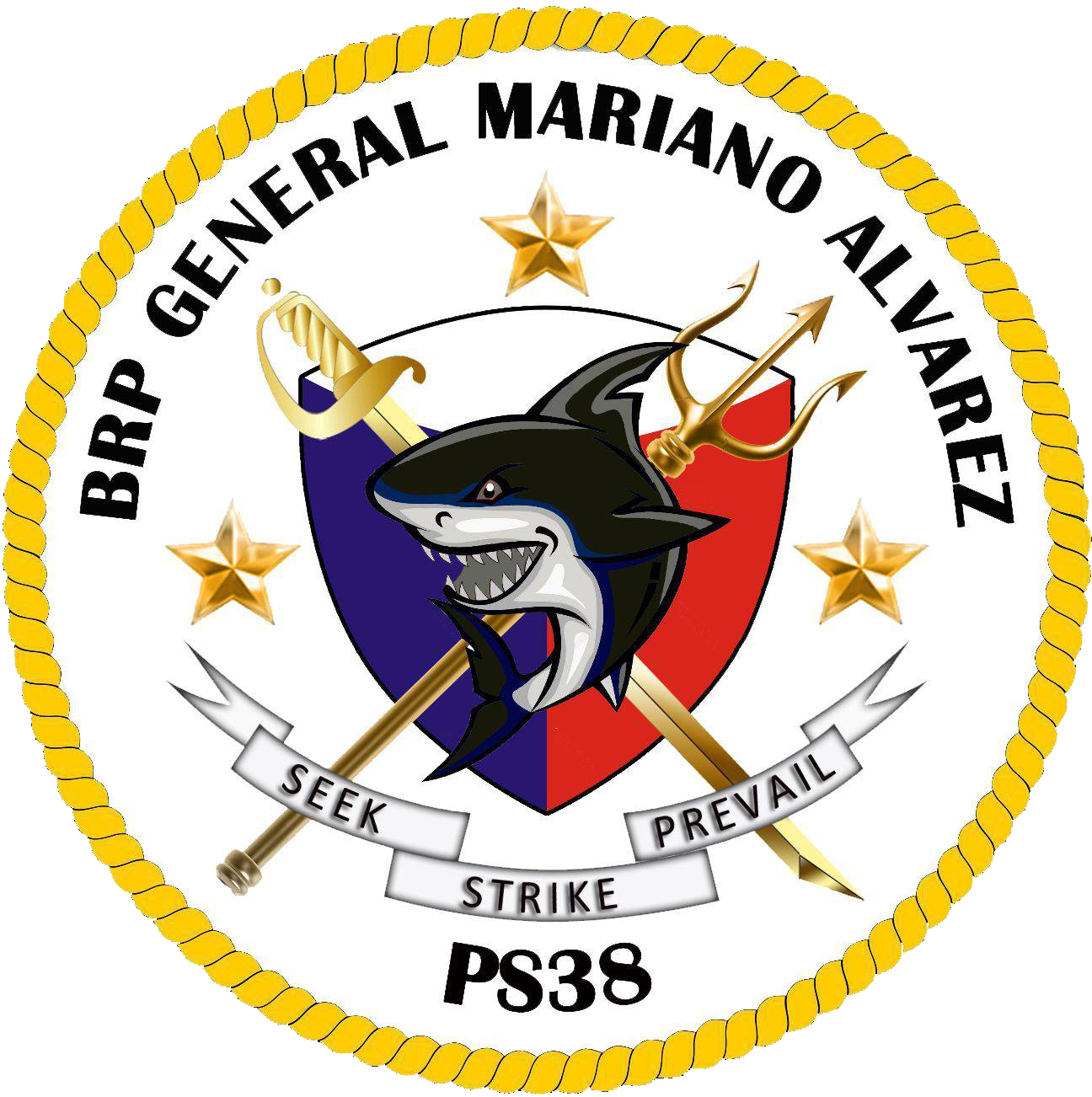
- Badge

General characteristics
- Class & type: Mariano Alvarez class
- Type: Coastal Patrol Vessel
- Displacement: 357 tons full load
- Length: 170.3 ft (51.9 m)
- Beam: 25.9 ft (7.9 m)
- Draft: 7.9 ft (2.4 m)
- Installed power: 13,400 hp (10,000 kW)
- Propulsion: 4 × Paxman Valenta 16V RP-200CM Diesel Engines, 4 propellers
- Speed: 35 knots (65 km/h; 40 mph) (maximum)
- Range: 2,900 mi (2,500 nmi; 4,700 km)at 12 knots (22 km/h; 14 mph)
- Endurance: 10 days
- Boats & landing craft carried: 1 × 20-foot RHIB
- Complement: 28 + 8
- Sensors & processing systems: AN/SPS-64(V)9 I-band Surface Search Radar; Sperry Vision RASCAR 2100M Combat System; Sperry Vision RASCAR 3400C X-band Navigation/Surface Search Radar; Sperry Vision RASCAR 3400C S-band Navigation/Surface Search Radar; Wesmar side-scanning hull-mounted Sonar; Marconi VISTAR IM 405 FLIR System
- Electronic warfare & decoys: Privateer AN/APR-39(V)1 ESM radar warning; 1 × Mk.52 Mod.0 sextuple Chaff Launchers
- Armament: 1 × Mk.38 Bushmaster 25 mm cannon; 1 × Mk.96 stabilized Bushmaster 25 mm cannon with Mk.19 Mod.3 40 mm Automatic Grenade Launcher; 4 × M2HG Browning 12.7 mm 50 caliber machine guns; 2 × M60 7.62 mm machine gun

BRP General Mariano Alvarez (PS-38/176) is the lead ship of its class of three coastal patrol ships currently in service with the Philippine Navy. She was originally the lead ship USS Cyclone (PC-1) of the US Navy's Cyclone-class patrol ship and then USCGC Cyclone (WPC-1) of the US Coast Guard prior to being transferred to the Philippine Navy.

== History ==
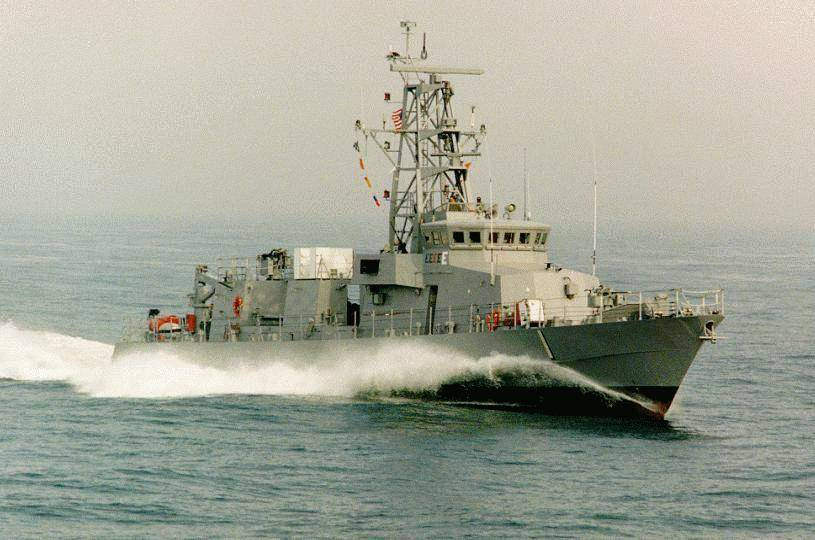
As USS Cyclone (PC-1)

Launched as the first of fourteen ships of the Cyclone-class patrol ship, the primary mission of USS Cyclone (PC-1) was to serve as a platform for conducting maritime special operations, including interdiction, escort, noncombatant evacuation, reconnaissance, operational deception, intelligence collection, and tactical swimmer operations. Her small size, stealthy construction and high speed were tailored to performing long-range Special Operations Forces (SOF) insertion and extraction as well as other SOF support duties as needed.

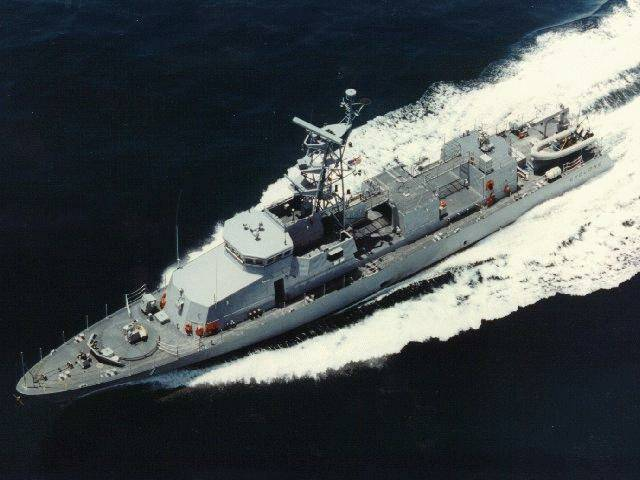
Another photo of USS Cyclone (PC-1)

As good a design as it was, Cyclone had barely gone into service in the mid-1990s when the Special Operations Command rejected them as too big for commando missions, and the regular surface Navy dismissed them as too small for any of its missions. The Navy began looking for ways to phase out Cyclone and her sister ships, so on 28 February 2000, Cyclone was decommissioned and stricken from the Navy list.

She was then transferred to the United States Coast Guard the next day, being re-commissioned as USCGC Cyclone (WPC-1). The Coast Guard lacked an effective vessel sized between its Island-class patrol boat and the Reliance-class Medium Endurance Cutter, so there was considerable interest in Cyclone at first. However, her high operating costs were prohibitive and thus she sat largely inactive.

Cyclone was eventually sold under FMS (Foreign Military Sales Program) to the Philippine Navy in January 2004, as part of a US military aid package to the Philippines, in an effort to bolster interdiction and counterterrorism capabilities. She was rechristened BRP General Mariano Alvarez (PS-38) on 8 March 2004, in honor of a revolutionary general in the Philippine war of independence against Spain. She is currently assigned to the Patrol Force of the Philippine Fleet.

On 13 March 2013, while she was conducting maritime patrol together with Jose Andrada along the seawater off Omapoy Island and Bulo-Bulo Island, all of Sitangkai, Tawi-Tawi, they intercepted 2 watercraft loaded with 35 evacuees.

She was also one of the naval vessels that was deployed to Zamboanga City during the Zamboanga City crisis.

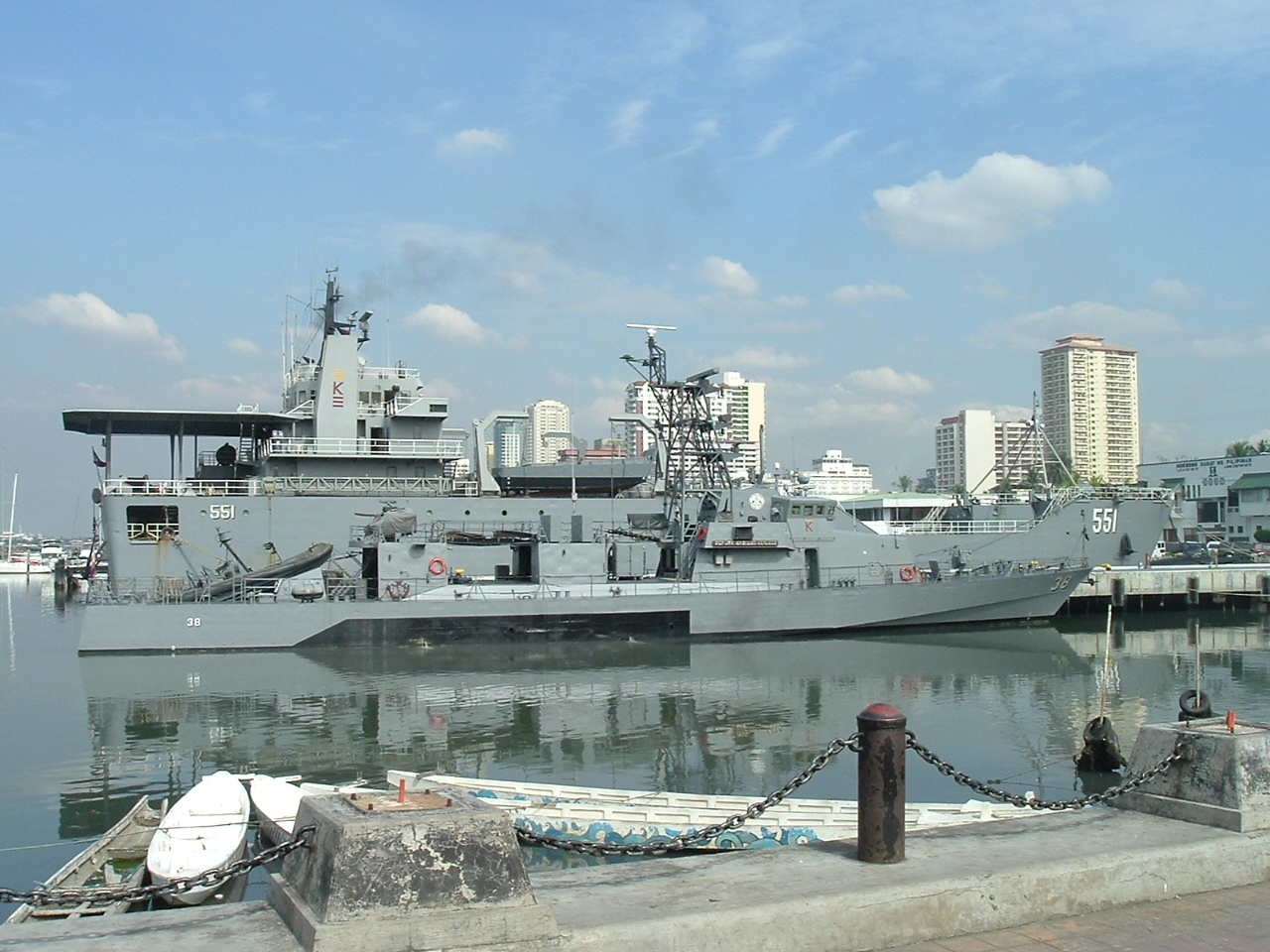
BRP General Mariano Alvarez moored together with BRP Dagupan City (LC-551).

== Technical details ==
=== Performance ===
The ship's operational capabilities were designed to meet the unique requirements of its Special Warfare missions. Operationally, the ship is capable of accelerating from stop to 35 knots (65 km/h) in under three minutes, then move from full ahead to 15 knots (28 km/h) astern in 60 seconds. In high-speed, hard-over turns, the ship barely heeled as the automatic stabilizers engaged.

=== Weapons ===
Originally armed with two Mk38 25 mm chain guns fore and aft, several pintle mounts for attaching .50 caliber machine guns or Mk 19 grenade launchers, and a position for launching Stinger shoulder-fired SAMs (although this was removed when the ship was transferred to the Philippine Navy and is currently unavailable), the ship, along with others of her class still in the US Navy, were upgraded early on by replacing the after Mk.38 mount with the new Mk.96 platform. The Mk.96 combines both a M242 Bushmaster 25 mm chain gun and a 40 mm automatic grenade launcher on a single stabilized platform. The Mk.96 features an electro-optical fire control system with 27x zoom, infrared and low-light modes, a laser rangefinder, and an array of environmental sensors, which feed data into the ballistics computer to produce an accurate firing solution even while maneuvering at high speed. The computer can also interface with Stinger SAMs (which are currently unavailable). The US Navy was positive about the performance of the Mk.96 and briefly considered up-gunning the 25 mm Bushmaster cannon to a 30 mm or even 35 mm cannon, but due to the high price this never came to pass.

=== Sensors ===
The Sperry Vision 2100M combat system employs the navigational radars and the Sperry Voyage Management System integrated navigation and control system as a combat data suite. The radar intercept equipment was developed for use on helicopters. Has a Sperry Marine automated Integrated Bridge System (IBS).Each Mk 52 decoy rocket launcher carries 12 ready-service rounds, and 15 more rockets per launcher are carried in adjacent lockers. Ammunition supply includes 2,000 rounds 25-mm, 2,000 rounds .50 cal, 2,000 rounds 7.62-mm, and 1,000 40-mm grenades.

Navigation systems include Global Positioning System and Loran receivers. Radio gear includes LST-5C SATCOM/line-of-sight UHF transceiver, A5 Spectra VHF radio, ICM120 Marine Band radio, and RF 5000 HF, VRC-92A VHF, and VRC-83(V)2 VHF/UHF transceivers. AN/SAT-2A infrared signaling systems are fitted, and the Marconi Vistar stabilized FLIR sensor with integral low-light-level television camera is mounted on the mast. Have IFF transponder but no interrogation capability, although it may be added later. The sonar transducer is retracted within the hull at speeds above 14 kn.

=== Structure ===
The hull was constructed using BS-4360 Grade 43A steel, the superstructure was constructed using 5086 aluminum alloy. Main propulsion is generated by four Paxman Valenta 16CM-16RP200M diesels, developing 3,350 bhp, driving 12.8 cm six-blade highly skewed, variable pitch and rake, NI-AL bronze MIL-B24480A, alloy 1 amendment 3 (nickel-aluminum-bronze alloy) propellers, with pitch ratio of 1.465 at 0.7 radius and designed by USN NSWCCD (Code 544 drawing number P-5237B). Four Reintjes WVS-2232 reduction gearbox, with a reduction ratio: 2.025:1. Fuel capacity is 47,772 liters (12,620 gallons). Oil capacity is 568 liters (150 gallons). Total air conditioning plants production, 83.33 kW. They can refuel at sea, using astern fueling rigs. Fully operational at Sea State 3 with cruising speed of 25 knots (46 km/h; 29 mph), with 50% fuel capacity. Ship can survive up to Sea State 5. Maximum ship endurance at 10 days. Electricity supplied by two Caterpillar Model 3306 DIT Series B, rating 150 kW @ 1,800 rpm. Reverse osmosis desalinators, having a 1,514 liters (400 gallons) capacity per day. Fresh water capacity is 4,701 liters (1,242 gallons). Equipped with Vosper fin stabilization system and a stern wedge to improve trim at high speeds. Kevlar armor is fitted to the command space.

=== Upgrades ===
Refitted by Bollinger Machine Shop and Shipyard prior to delivery and received a stern ramp modification upgrade known as the Combat Craft Retrieval System (CCRS) which had the ship's stern extended by nine feet to accommodate a deck ramp - which extends down to below the water line, for a 20 feet Rigid Hull Inflatable Boat (RHIB).

== Operational history ==
In April 2018, the BRP General Mariano Alvarez intercepted the Mongolian-registered M/V Diamond 8 after seeing some suspicious movement by the foreign vessel skippered by a Chinese national named Lin Yang Yin. Upon further investigation, approximately 27,180 sacks of Vietnam rice weighing 1,359 metric tons with an estimated market value of P67,950,000 was found on board the ship, along with 34 undocumented Filipinos, one of whom was a minor. General Mariano Alvarez subsequently escorted Diamond 8 to the Ensign Majini Pier in Zamboanga City. The crew of General Mariano Alvarez were eventually given the Bronze Cross Medal for this accomplishment on 12 May 2018.

In May 2018, the ship participated in the Third Combined Maritime Security Activity with the Royal Australian Navy (RAN) along with Cebu, Anastacio Cacayorin, Dioscoro Papa and Filipino Flojo. General Mariano Alvarez conducted a meeting procedure off the coast of Zamboanga City, for entering the harbor with the RAN vessels HMAS Albany (ACPB 86) and HMAS Glenelg (ACPB 96) as part of the activity.

In September 2018, General Mariano Alvarez participated in the Fifth Combined Maritime Security Activity in Zamboanga City, with the RAN which sent HMAS Launceston (ACPB 94). The activity benefited both navies in terms of inter-operability training while complementing the maritime security operations of Western Mindanao Command by enhancing Naval presence and deterrence of movement of lawless elements at sea.

In November 2018, the ship participated in the four-day 4th INDOMALPHI Trilateral Port Visit and Maritime Training Activity in Zamboanga City, along with the Albatros-class fast attack craft Sura of the Indonesian Navy and Jerung-class gunboat Pari of the Royal Malaysian Navy. The activities of the exercise include a Capability Demonstration, Day Tours and Sports aimed at strengthening relations, enhancing mutual cooperation and interoperability of the three navies.

In early October 2021, the BRP General Mariano Alvarez took the place of the BRP Emilio Jacinto (PS-35) in the Island Province of Tawi-Tawi as the latter was set to undergo Repairs and Upgrade.
