= British Rail Class D2/1 =

Class of diesel-hydraulic locomotives

Type and origin
- Power type: Diesel-hydraulic
- Builder: North British Locomotive Company
- Serial number: 27100–27102, 27431–27435
- Build date: 1953–1956
- Total produced: 8
Specifications
- Configuration
  - Whyte: 0-4-0DH
  - UIC: B
- Gauge: 4 ft 8 1/2 in (1,435 mm) standard gauge
- Wheel diameter: 3 ft 6 in (1.067 m)
- Loco weight: 32.00 long tons (32.51 t; 35.84 short tons)
- Prime mover: Paxman 6RPH
- Transmission: Hydraulic, Voith
- MU working: Not fitted
- Train heating: None
- Train brakes: None
Performance figures
- Maximum speed: 14.5 mph (23.3 km/h)
- Power output: 200 bhp (149 kW)
- Tractive effort: 21,500 lbf (95.6 kN)
Career
- Operators: British Railways
- Class: DY11; later D2/1; later 2/4A
- Numbers: 11700-11707; D2700–D2707 from 1958 to 1960
- Axle load class: Route availability 3
- Withdrawn: 1963–1968
- Disposition: All scrapped

British Rail Class D2/1 was a locomotive commissioned by British Rail in England. It was a diesel powered locomotive in the pre-TOPS period built by the North British Locomotive Company with a Paxman engine. Eight locomotives were built and they were numbered D2700-D2707.

River Eden the shunter at RAF Leuchars was built to the same specification as the D2/1 and is preserved at Fife Heritage Railway.

== See also ==
- List of British Rail classes

== Sources ==
- Ian Allan ABC of British Railways Locomotives (Winter 1962/3 ed.). p. 201.
