= British Rail Class 21 (NBL) =

Diesel-electric locomotives (1958–1968)

North British Type 2 diesel-electric British Railways Class 21
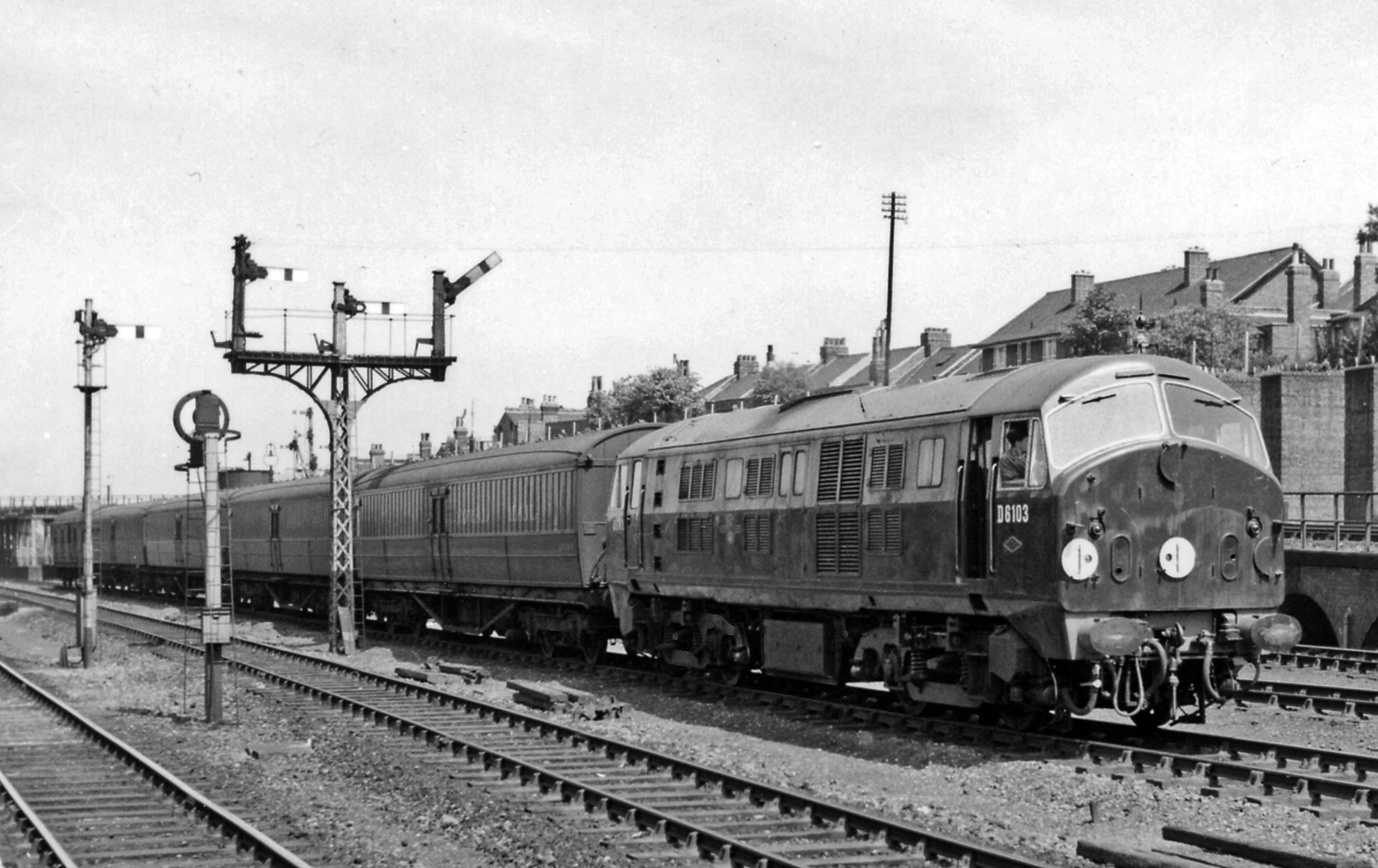
- D6103 at Harringay West in 1959.
Type and origin
- Power type: Diesel-electric
- Builder: North British Locomotive Co.
- Build date: 1958–1960
- Total produced: 58
Specifications
- Configuration
  - UIC: Bo'Bo'
  - Commonwealth: Bo-Bo
- Gauge: 4 ft 8 1/2 in (1,435 mm) standard gauge
- Wheel diameter: 3 ft 7 in (1,092 mm)
- Minimum curve: 3.5 chains (231 ft; 70.4 m)
- Wheelbase
  - Engine: 37 ft 0 in (11,278 mm)
  - Bogie: 8 ft 6 in (2,591 mm)
- Pivot centres: 28 ft 6 in (8,687 mm)
- Length
  - Over buffers: 51 ft 6 in (15,697 mm)
- Width: 8 ft 8 in (2,642 mm)
- Height: 12 ft 8 in (3,861 mm)
- Loco weight: 72.5 long tons (73.7 t; 81.2 short tons)
- Fuel capacity: 460 imp gal (2,100 L; 550 US gal)
- Prime mover: MAN L12V18/21S
- Generator: DC
- Traction motors: 4 × GEC WT440
- Transmission: Diesel electric
- MU working: D6100–D6137: ● Red circle D6138–D6157: ★ Blue star
- Train heating: Spanner 1,500 pounds (680 kg) per hour Steam generator
- Train brakes: Vacuum
Performance figures
- Maximum speed: 75 mph (121 km/h)
- Power output: Engine: 1,000 hp (746 kW) or 1,100 hp (820 kW)
- Tractive effort: Maximum: 45,000 lbf (200.2 kN)
- Brakeforce: 50 long tons-force (500 kN)
Career
- Operators: British Rail
- Numbers: D6100–D6157
- Axle load class: Route availability 6 (5 from 1969)
- Retired: 1967–1968
- Disposition: 20 rebuilt to Class 29, remainder scrapped

The British Rail Class 21 was a type of Type 2 diesel-electric locomotive built by the North British Locomotive Company in Glasgow for British Rail in 1958–1960. They were numbered D6100-D6157. Thirty-eight of the locomotives were withdrawn by August 1968; the rest were rebuilt with bigger engines to become Class 29, although those locos only lasted until 1971.

== Description ==
Under the British Railways Modernisation Plan, a batch of ten 1,000 hp (746 kW) diesel-electric locomotives were ordered from the North British Locomotive Co. for evaluation under BR's dieselisation pilot scheme. At the same time, six externally similar locomotives with hydraulic transmission were ordered for comparison, these becoming Class 22. Repeat orders resulted in a total of 58 of the diesel-electric locomotives being built (numbered D6100–6157). They were delivered between December 1958 and November 1960.

== Operation ==
=== Eastern Region ===
The first 38 locomotives entered service in 1958-59 from the Eastern Region depots at Stratford, Hornsey and Ipswich engine shed on commuter services into London, where they were evaluated against rival designs from English Electric, British Railways, Birmingham RC&W and Brush. The type proved chronically unreliable in Eastern Region service - by March 1960 the Hornsey allocation had moved to New England Yard, Peterborough for storage. This came to the attention of the newspapers and the Daily Telegraph reported that brand new diesel locomotives were being hidden and dumped, which caused questions to be asked in Parliament. The D6100s moved north to the Scottish Region in mid-April 1960, ostensibly to be nearer to the NBL works for repairs but allegedly to move them away from the eyes of the national press.

=== Scottish Region ===
The final 20 locomotives had uprated 1,100 hp (820 kW) engines and were delivered to Kittybrewster depot on the Scottish Region. They were joined on the Scottish Region by the first 38 locos, which were allocated to Glasgow Eastfield depot, close to the North British factory at Springburn where they had been built. They were used widely across the Scottish Region on a range of work, freight, local passenger and express passenger, the latter sometimes in pairs. Common double headers included Oban & Callander workings, Glasgow-Dundee/Aberdeen expresses, and many freights, and the Ballater Royal train was entrusted to two locos with a standby. They were common on the West Highland lines, Great North of Scotland lines and in the works. Just one original locomotive, D6109, was repainted in BR Blue with headcodes.

=== Problems ===
Distribution of locomotives, August 1967
British Rail Class 21 (NBL) is located in Scotland
Code	Name	Quantity
61B	Aberdeen (Ferryhill)	18
65A	Eastfield	19
65B	St Rollox	1
Rebuilt to class 29 (1963–67)		20
Total built:		58

They proved to be unreliable in service, and during 1960 the Eastern Region fleet was transferred to Eastfield depot on the Scottish Region for convenience of return to their manufacturer when warranty work was required. However, the North British Locomotive Works closed in 1962, by which time the type's principal shortcomings had become plain. D6100s suffered problems with the coupling between the power unit and the generator. The engines themselves were a MAN design, but which were built under licence by NBL and of inferior quality to the German originals. Engine cooling systems proved to be inadequate, diesel engines leaked and were not constructed to the appropriate tolerances, cylinder heads fractured and lubricating oil escaped into the battery compartments located below the power unit. These flaws were mostly rectified on a rebuilding programme in 1961–62.

The positioning of minor components within the locomotive bodyshell meant that small faults could only be rectified on depot or by return to a railway workshop, which resulted in poor daily availability for traffic figures for the type. Engine room fires were common and wrote off several locomotives. However the later batch, with the B series engine, proved more reliable but still suffered problems. Problems with the NBL/MAN engines are detailed in a report prepared at Swindon in September 1962. This related to the Class 22 but similar problems were experienced with the Class 21.

== Rebuilding ==
In an attempt to improve reliability, 20 locomotives (D6100–03, D6106-D6108, D6112–D6114, D6116, D6119, D6121, D6123, D6124, D6129, D6130, D6133, D6134 and D6137) were re-engined between 1963 and 1967 with 1,350 hp (1,010 kW) Paxman Ventura engines to form Class 29.

== Withdrawal ==
The remaining 38 locomotives retained their original NBL/MAN engines until they were withdrawn from service between December 1967 and August 1968 and sold for scrap. Most were cut up by Scottish scrap dealers McWilliams of Shettleston or Barnes and Bell of Coatbridge, but locomotive D6122 was sold to Woodham Brothers scrapyard in Barry, Vale of Glamorgan, South Wales, after a re-railing demonstration at Hither Green, Southern Region on 2 November 1967 where it languished until 1980 before being broken up. None have survived.

== Models ==
Dapol have produced a Class 21 in OO gauge in a variety of liveries.

== Sources ==
- Ian Allan ABC of British Railways Locomotives, summer 1966 edition
- Clough, David N. (2005). "Pilot Scheme Type B/Type 2: NBL D6100 and 6300 series". Diesel Pioneers. Ian Allan. pp. 58–67. ISBN 978-0-7110-3067-1.
- Grindlay, Jim (2006). British Railways Locomotive Allocations 1948-1968 (Part 6 - Diesel & Electric Locomotives). Troon: Modelmaster Publications. ISBN 978-0-9544264-6-0.
- Haresnape, Brian (February 1983). 4: Production Diesel-Electrics Types 1-3. British Rail Fleet Survey. Shepperton: Ian Allan. ISBN 0-7110-1275-X. GE/0283.
- Stevens-Stratten, S.W.; Carter, R.S. (1978). British Rail Main-Line Diesels. Shepperton: Ian Allan Ltd. ISBN 0-7110-0617-2.
- Sugden, S.A. (April 1994). Diesel & Electric Loco Register (3rd edn). Sheffield: Platform 5. ISBN 1-872524-55-9.
