= Broadmeadow Locomotive Depot =

Former locomotive depot

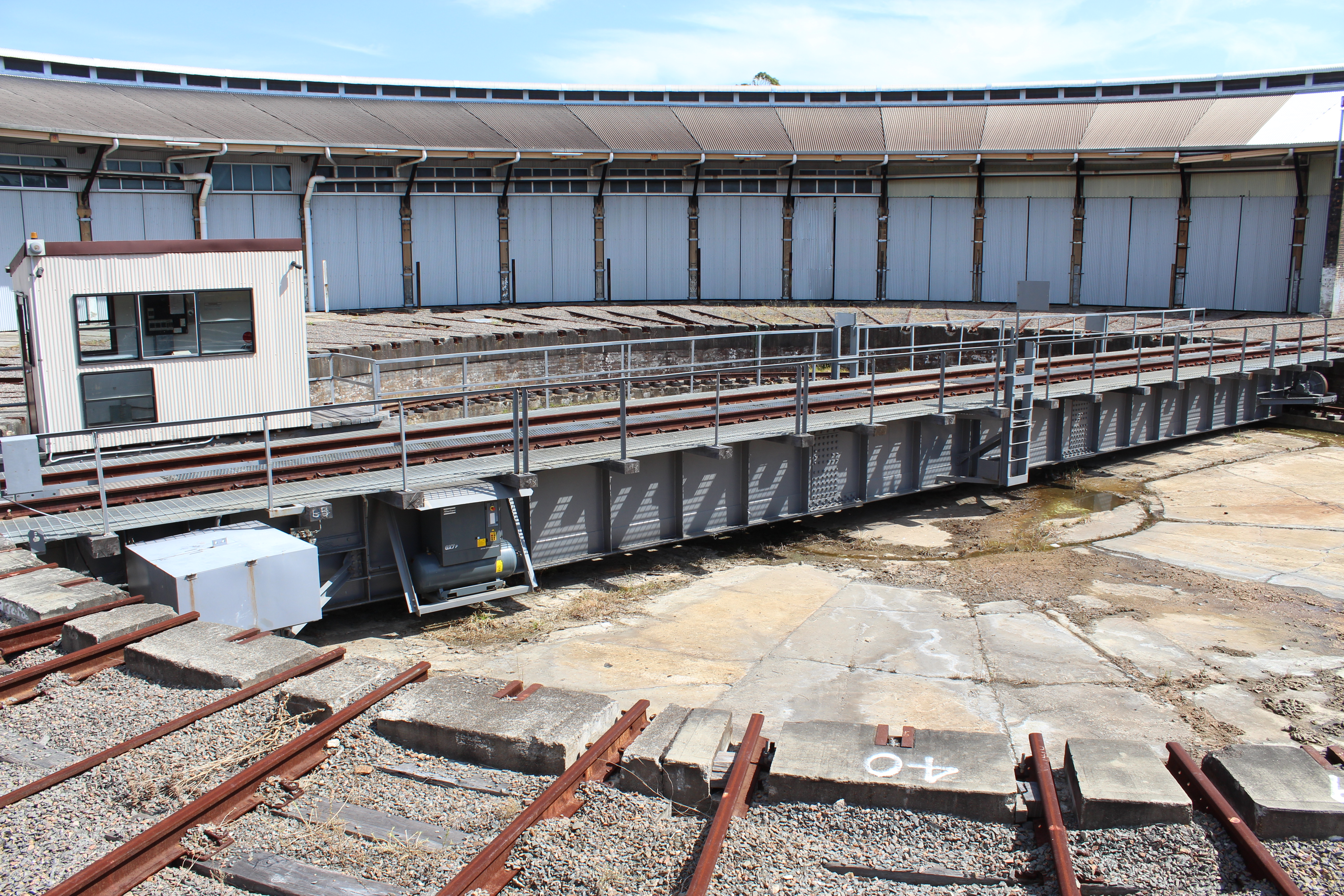
- Electrically powered 32 m (105 ft) diameter turntable serving No. 2 Roundhouse
- Interactive map of Broadmeadow Locomotive Depot

Location
- Location: Broadmeadow, New South Wales
- Coordinates: 32°55′35.6″S 151°43′35.60″E

Characteristics
- Owner: Transport Asset Manager of New South Wales
- Operator: FreightCorp
- Depot code: 2
- Type: Twin roundhouse
- Roads: 2 x 21 undercover
- Routes served: Main Northern

History
- Opened: 1924
- Closed: 24 December 1994

Broadmeadow Locomotive Depot (NSW depot number 2) was a large locomotive depot consisting of two roundhouse buildings and associated facilities constructed by the New South Wales Government Railways adjacent to the marshalling yard on the Main Northern line at Broadmeadow. Construction of the locomotive depot at Broadmeadow commenced in 1923 to replace the existing crowded loco sheds at Woodville Junction at Hamilton, with the depot opening in March 1924. It was added to the New South Wales State Heritage Register on 2 April 1999.

== History ==
=== Original facilities ===
NSWR drawing of the concrete drop panel construction Chargeman's office at Broadmeadow Loco Depot 1923

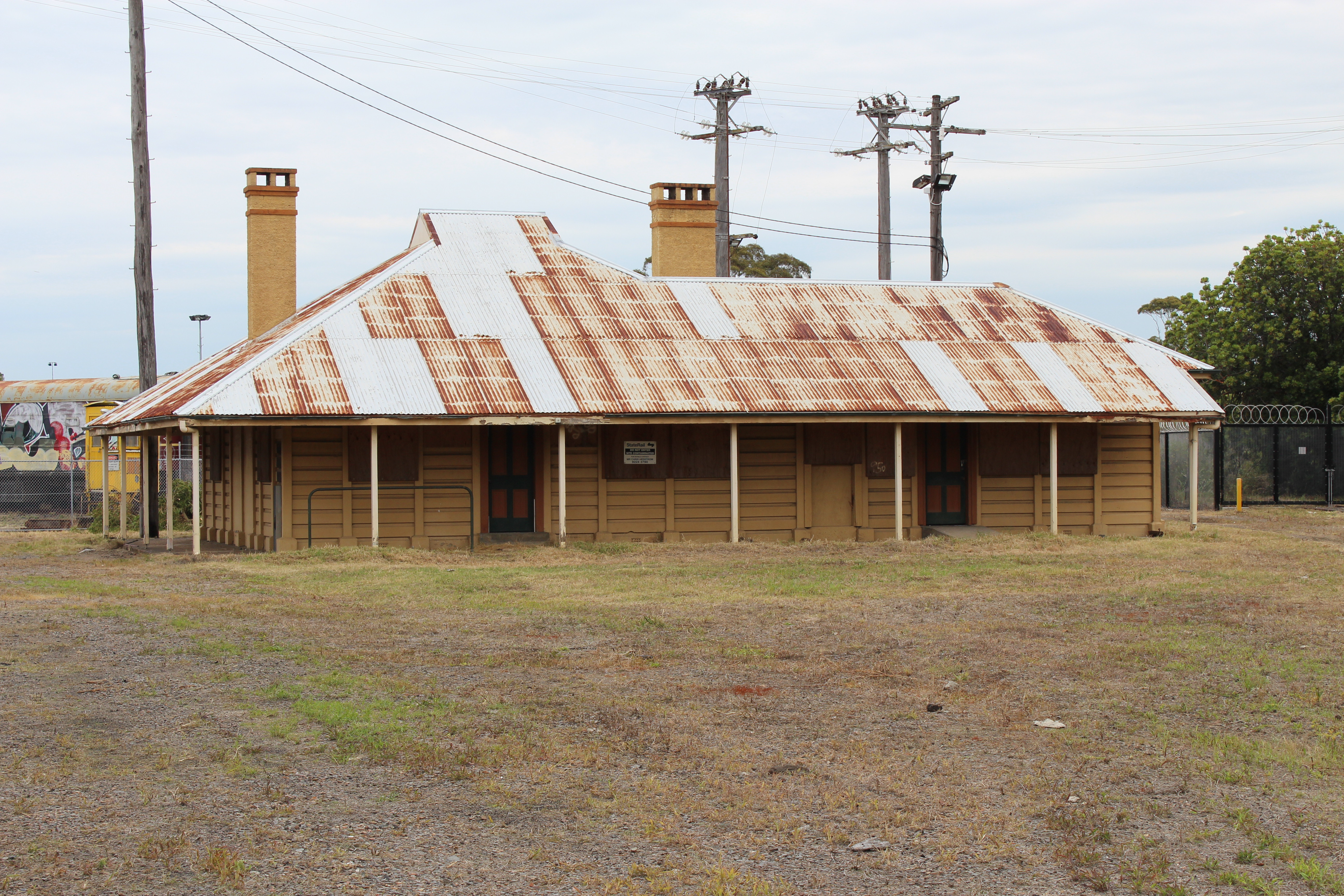
The concrete drop panel construction District Locomotive Engineer's Office

Original facilities provided include a single manually operated 23 m (75 ft) diameter turntable with 42 radiating roads. Twenty one of these roads were covered by a wooden framed roundhouse building clad in corrugated sheeting. All 21 roads in the roundhouse had 18 m (60 ft) long pits, radial drop pits were fitted to all 21 roads. Two elevated 227,300 L (50,000 imp gal) tanks fed three 229 mm (9 in) diameter water columns. An office for the District Locomotive Engineer (referred to as the DLE) was constructed using concrete drop panels. An office building for the Superintendent, Steam Shed Inspector, Timkeepers & Clerks was built near the water tanks along with a rest barracks for crews from other depots that was located near the depot, with both of these buildings also using the concrete drop panel method of construction.

Coaling was provided by a 1,000-tonne (1,000-long-ton) capacity wooden elevated coal bunker capable of loading coal to locos on both sides. The coaling stage was 76 m (250 ft) long by 11 m (37 ft) high and was served by a 1:30 grade approach ramp. The coal bunker was also provided with storage and drying facilities for sand, with two wet sand bunkers of 51 tonnes (50 long tons) capacity and two dry sand bunkers of 51 tonnes (50 long tons) capacity being provided. A timber framed machine shop clad in corrugated iron served from one of the radial roads from No. 1 turntable was also provided. This building housed the wheel lathe as well as general lathes and other machine tools for use in maintaining the locomotives based at the depot. Also housed in this building was a blacksmiths section and the air compressors for supplying compressed air to the depot, along with the pumps for the boiler washing out plant. A timber framed corrugated iron clad meal room for running staff capable of housing 140 men was also built near the workshop.

Adjacent to the arrival road inspection pits and a timber framed stores building clad in corrugated iron was also provided. Two elevated de-ashing roads were constructed to the south of the site near the coal stage. These de-ashing pits consisted of a set of pits between the rails and side pits that were used for the disposal of the ashes from the smokebox and ashpan produced by the burning of coal in the firebox of the steam locomotives. Running underneath these pits at an angle was a sunken rail line where wagons were placed to collect the deposited ashes. In 1925, these deashing pits had a steel and timber frame corrugated iron clad shed constructed over them.

=== No. 2 turntable constructed ===
In July 1926, construction of the manually operated 23 m (75 ft) diameter No. 2 turntable at its associated 42 radial roads was completed. Unlike the roads surrounding No. 1 turntable, initially none of the radial roads on No. 2 turntable were covered. Over the following years, several plans were proposed for the construction of a roundhouse building on the radial roads surrounding No. 2 turntable. A plan dated 30 January 1922 for a proposed Car and Wagon Works on land adjoining the loco depot site even shows a proposed third turntable, with all 3 turntables having full roundhouses.

=== Further additions and construction of No. 2 roundhouse ===
In July 1927, a third 227,300 L (50,000 imp gal) water tank was constructed. No major additions were carried out at the depot until 1945 when a third elevated de-ashing pit similar in construction to the original two de-ashing pits was constructed beside the original two pits, however the shelter covering the original pits was not extended to cover this new pit. The DLE's office was also extended in 1945. A further improvement carried out in 1945 was the fitting of electric drive to the manually operated 23 m (75 ft) diameter No. 1 turntable. Improved facilities were provided for the employees at the depot in 1947 with a new meal, locker and shower room being built. This building could accommodate 144 persons in the meal room, and had lockers for 300 persons.

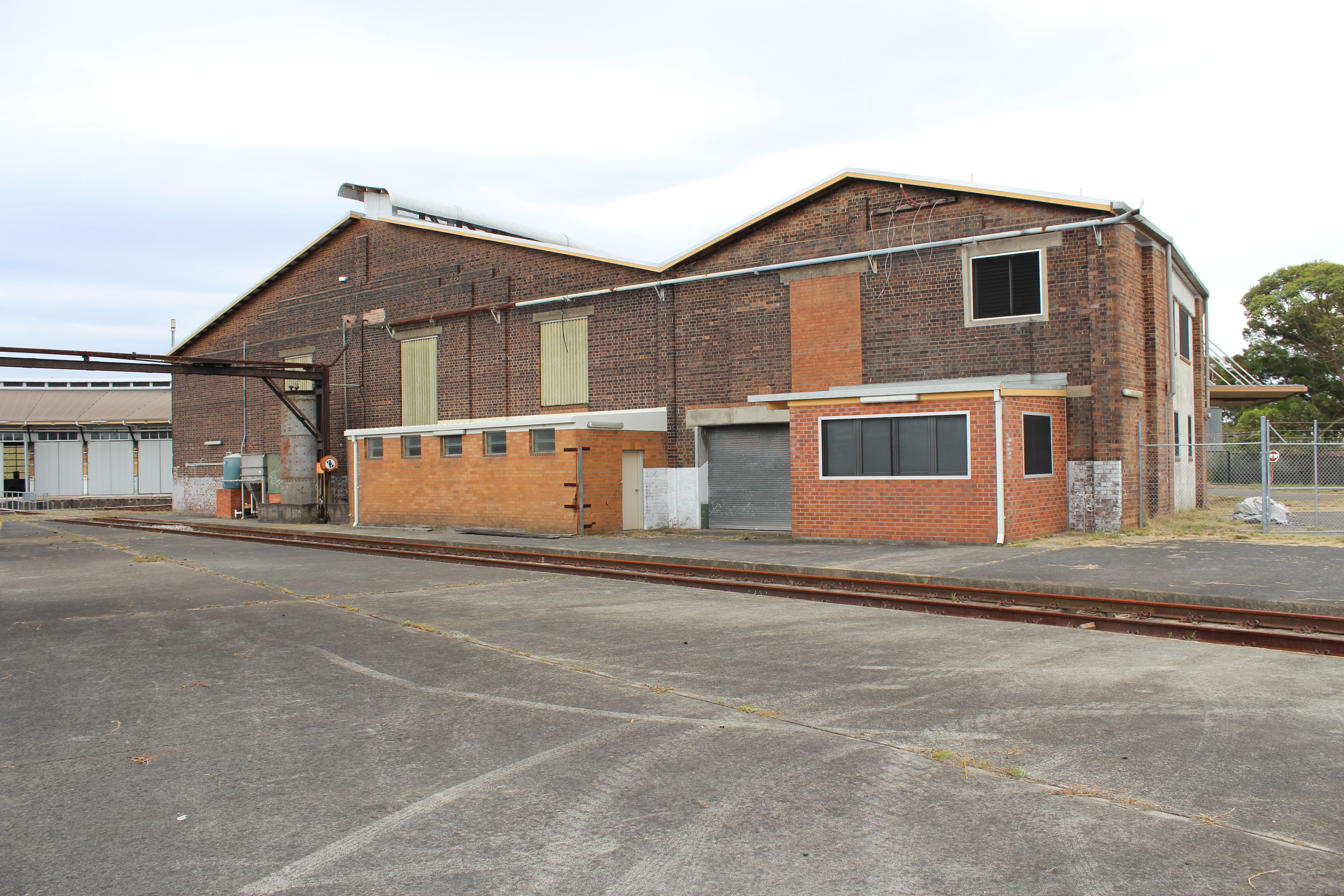
The end wall of the surviving No. 2 Roundhouse showing the extension for the Garratt locos

In 1948, planning started for a 21 road roundhouse building serving No. 2 turntable, however construction was not completed until 1951–52. All 21 undercover roads were in this building were fitted with 21 m (70 ft) long service pits. This building is of similar construction to the East shed section of the roundhouse completed in 1947 at Junee Locomotive Depot and has brick side and end walls with intermediate concrete columns and wooden roof trusses clad with corrugated sheeting. At the same time, the manually operated 23 m (75 ft) turntable was replaced with a 30 m (100 ft) diameter electrically operated turntable which was also similar to that provided at Junee. These works were for the proposed running of the D58 class locos from Broadmeadow. In 1948–49 a new office for the District Locomotive Engineer was constructed.

In 1952, drop pits were fitted to the service pits on roads 2–9 in No. 2 shed, with the jacks on 2–4 roads being 30 tonnes (30 long tons) capacity, the remanning jacks were of 20 tonnes (15 long tons) capacity. A 1 tonne (1 long ton) radial hoist was fitted in the roof covering all 21 roads running above the drop pits. A second 10 tonnes (7 long tons) capacity radial hoist was fitted over the drop pit roads. At the same time 11 of the existing service pits in No. 2 shed were lengthened to 25 m (83 ft) in length.

=== Alterations to suit the AD60 class steam locomotives ===
In 1954, work was completed on extending roads 18 to 21 and the covering building on No. 2 roundhouse to accommodate the new AD60 class Garratt locomotives at a cost of £87,662. This extension was of similar construction to the existing roundhouse. These roads were fitted with service pits 40 m (131 ft) long, with roads 20 and 21 being fitted with 20 tonnes (15 long tons) capacity drop pits. Four outdoor roads were also lengthened and fitted with pits 34 m (112 ft) long. To accommodate the length of the AD60 class locos, the turntable was lengthened to 32 m (105 ft) in diameter. The two Northern bays of the coaling stage had a dividing wall installed as well as having the bottom of the two bins raised to accommodate coaling of the Garratt locos. In 1954, one of the radial roads on No. 2 turntable was altered into an additional departure road from the depot, this road was provided with a de-ashing pit and was adjacent to the 45,500 L (10,000 imp gal) water tank and de-ashing pit on the existing departure road from No. 2 shed. Unlike the elevated de-ashing pits near the coaling stage these two pits were conventional style pits in between the rails that required to be manually emptied. These two pits were used for the disposal of any ashes that had built up during preparation of the steam locos prior to departing the loco depot to haul a train.

=== Alterations to suit diesel locomotives ===
With the introduction of diesel locomotives, fuel storage and refuelling facilities were initially provided. An additional 54,600 L (12,000 imp gal) fuel oil tank was provided in 1961. In 1962, Nos. 12 to 17 roads in No. 2 shed were upgraded to suit servicing diesel locomotives at a cost of £98,534. The steam servicing pits on these 6 roads were removed and replaced by elevated rail service pits. These new pits were fitted with service platforms at footplate level on both sides of the pits. This new section was partitioned off from the rest of the steam shed to keep out the grime associated with steam locomotives using the rest of the shed, improved lighting and ventilation was also fitted to this section of the shed. Additional rooms for the maintenance of diesel loco components along with oil storage tanks were constructed at the rear of this new section.

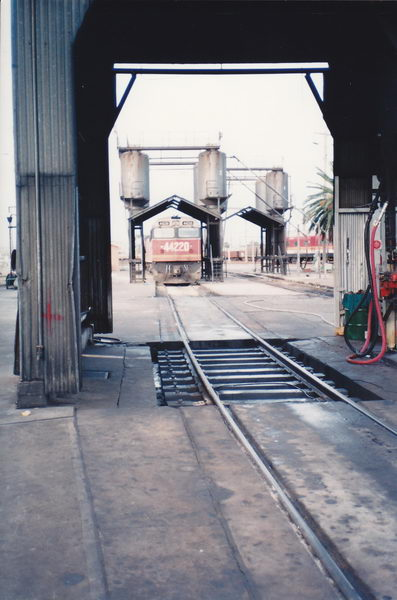
44220 in the loco sanding plant looking through the refuelling shed in 1990

In 1965, a Hegenscheidt pit wheel lathe was purchased for use at the depot for turning diesel loco wheels. This lathe was housed in a new shed constructed on land to the West of No. 1 Roundhouse at a cost of £90,962. This building was also fitted with a 3.0-tonne (3-long-ton) overhead crane.

As part of the upgrades to suit diesel locomotives, 2 of the outdoor radial roads from No. 2 turntable were connected to Broadmeadow yards and converted to arrival roads. A new 10 tonnes (7.5 long tons) capacity sanding plant for the diesel locos was constructed on one of these roads using steelwork transferred from Enfield Loco Depot. In 1966, a new diesel fuel storage facility was installed consisting of four 81,800 L (18,000 imp gal) tanks and pump house, additional fuelling points were provided on the new arrival roads. A load box building was constructed on one of the outdoor roads of No. 2 turntable to allow the stationary load testing of diesel electric locos after repairs. A new air compressor house was also constructed in 1965 adjacent to No. 2 Roundhouse.

=== End of steam and removal of steam facilities ===
In March 1970, construction of a new Administrative and amenities building to the West of the original 1924 DLE's office was completed. This building replaced both the existing meal, locker and shower building dating from 1947 along with the DLE's office dating from 1948 and the weatherboard general office building near the workshop, these buildings were demolished soon after the completion of the new building. The original 1924 DLE's office remained. In December 1970, two D59 class steam locomotives were transferred for use as stationary boilers.

In October 1971, a 2 road shed over the diesel loco refueling area on the two arrival roads was completed.

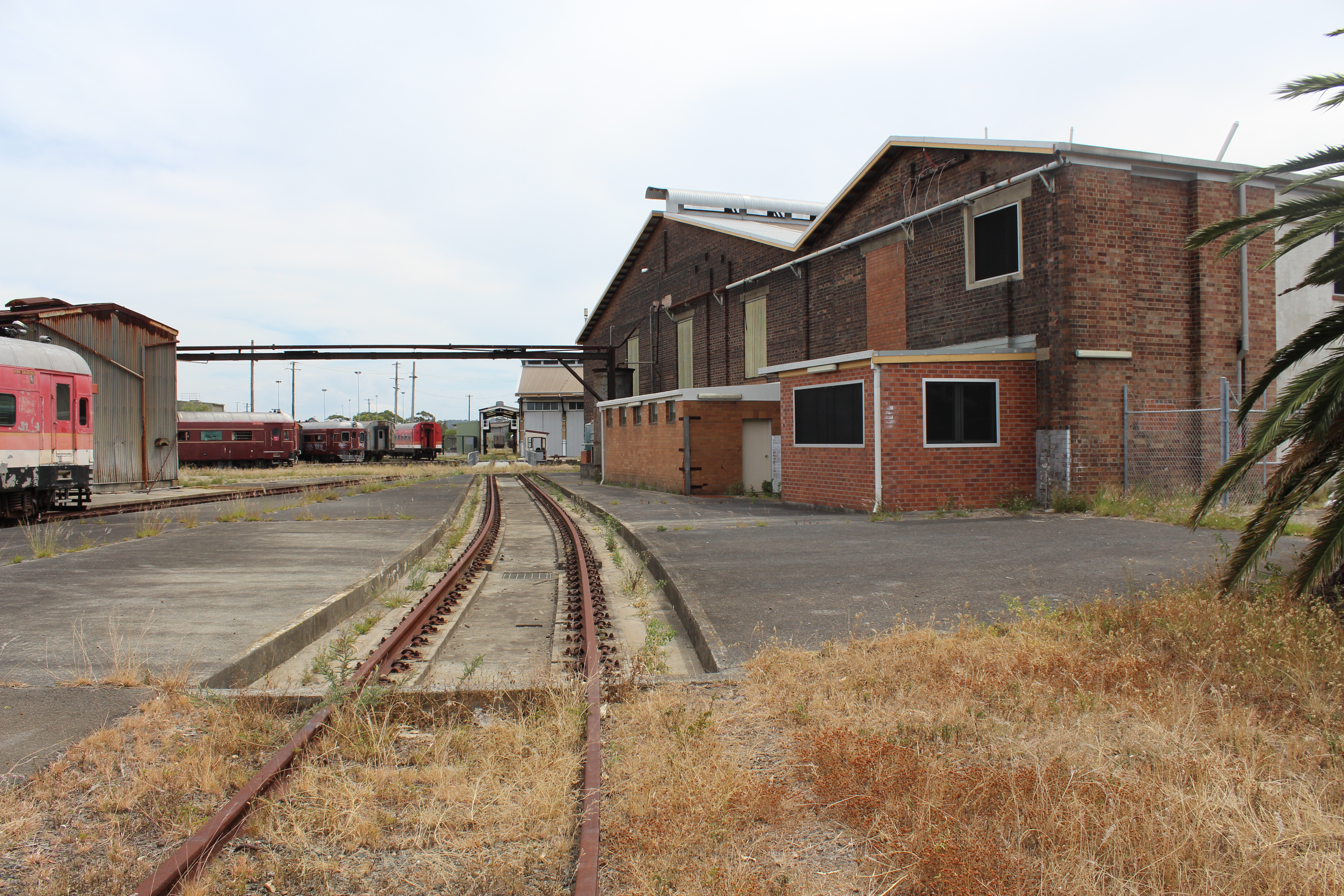
The Departure road from No. 2 Roundhouse with the roundhouse on the right & the refuelling shed on the left

Further improved facilities for diesel locos were in July 1972 with the upgrading of the sanding facilities with 2 49 tonnes (48 long tons) capacity sanding sheds being constructed. These 2 sheds were constructed on the arrival roads to No. 2 Roundhouse, and had 4 bins with each bin having a capacity of 12 tonnes (12 long tons).

Broadmeadow Loco Depot was the last stronghold of regular mainline steam haulage on the New South Wales system with 3246 hauling the last scheduled steam hauled passenger train between Singleton and Newcastle on 24 July 1971. The last mainline steam locomotive hauled train was also worked from the depot with 6042 working the last train on 24 February 1973, it then worked a special run from Newcastle to Broadmeadow on 2 March 1973 to mark the end of steam. The locomotive then worked to Sydney on 4 March 1973 ending the steam allocation at Broadmeadow Loco Depot.

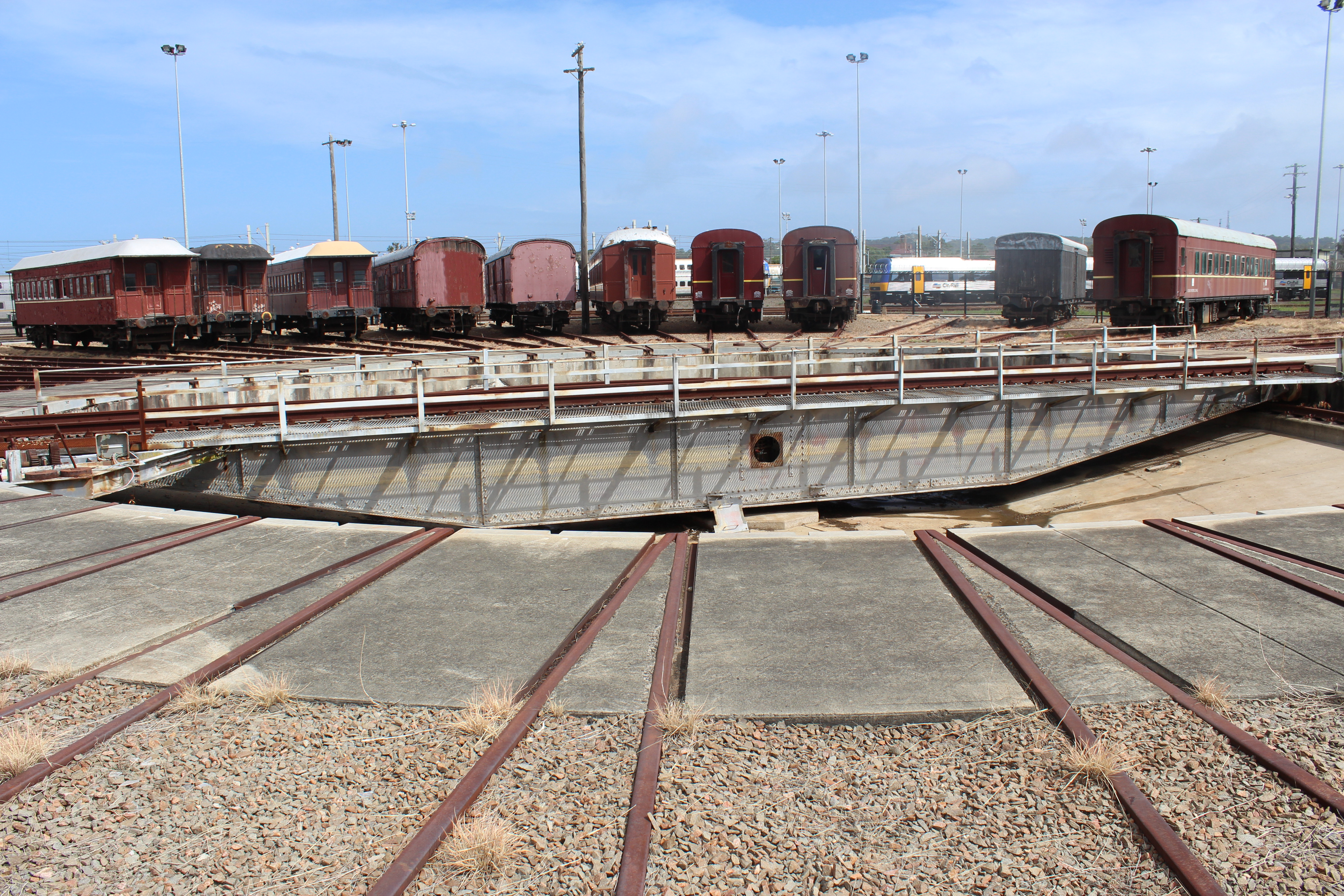
No. 1 Turntable with some of the preserved heritage rolling stock currently stored

During 1974, the water tanks and columns at the depot were demolished. Also in 1974 a steam cleaning shed was built on the straight transfer road between the two roundhouses adjacent to the original workshop building. In 1977 the coal stage was demolished. By the late 1970s, No. 1 roundhouse had ceased being used as a locomotive servicing facility and was being used a covered store and for wagon repairs.

=== Further alterations ===
In late 1977, tenders were called for the rebuilding of the Garratt Shed roads of No. 2 shed (roads 18–21). The 4 roads were shortened to a length similar to the adjoining roads and were fitted with elevated rail pits fitted with service platforms on both sides similar to that fitted to roads 12–17 in 1962. The area above the 4 roads was fitted with a false ceiling and was fitted with exhaust extraction fans. 1 Tonne cranes were also fitted over each of these 4 roads. The shed extension was fitted with a wall separating it from the main shed along with an elevated floor, with this floor and the ground floor of the divided off area being turned into office & stores accommodation. In 1979, the 2 de-ashing pits on Nos. 2 and 3 departure roads adjoining No. 2 shed were filled up and the surrounding area cement paved.

With the electrification of the Main Northern line from Wyong in June 1984, a siding was electrified adjacent to the depot for the servicing of electric locomotives.

In 1984, a new combined ambulance room & female staff amenities building of brick construction was built near the 1970s main administration & amenities building. In August 1985, tenders were called for a new waste water treatment plant. This plant was constructed to the West of No. 2 Roundhouse and was used to treat the dirty water from the shed pits etc. In 1987, a 3 road railcar maintenance centre was built on the site of the depot's arrival road inspection pits, coal stage embankment and stores building. This railcar centre was managed separately from the locomotive depot. Also in 1987, a new brick rest barracks building for crews from other depots was constructed to replace the original 1924 barracks building, with the original 1924 building being then leased to a community group.

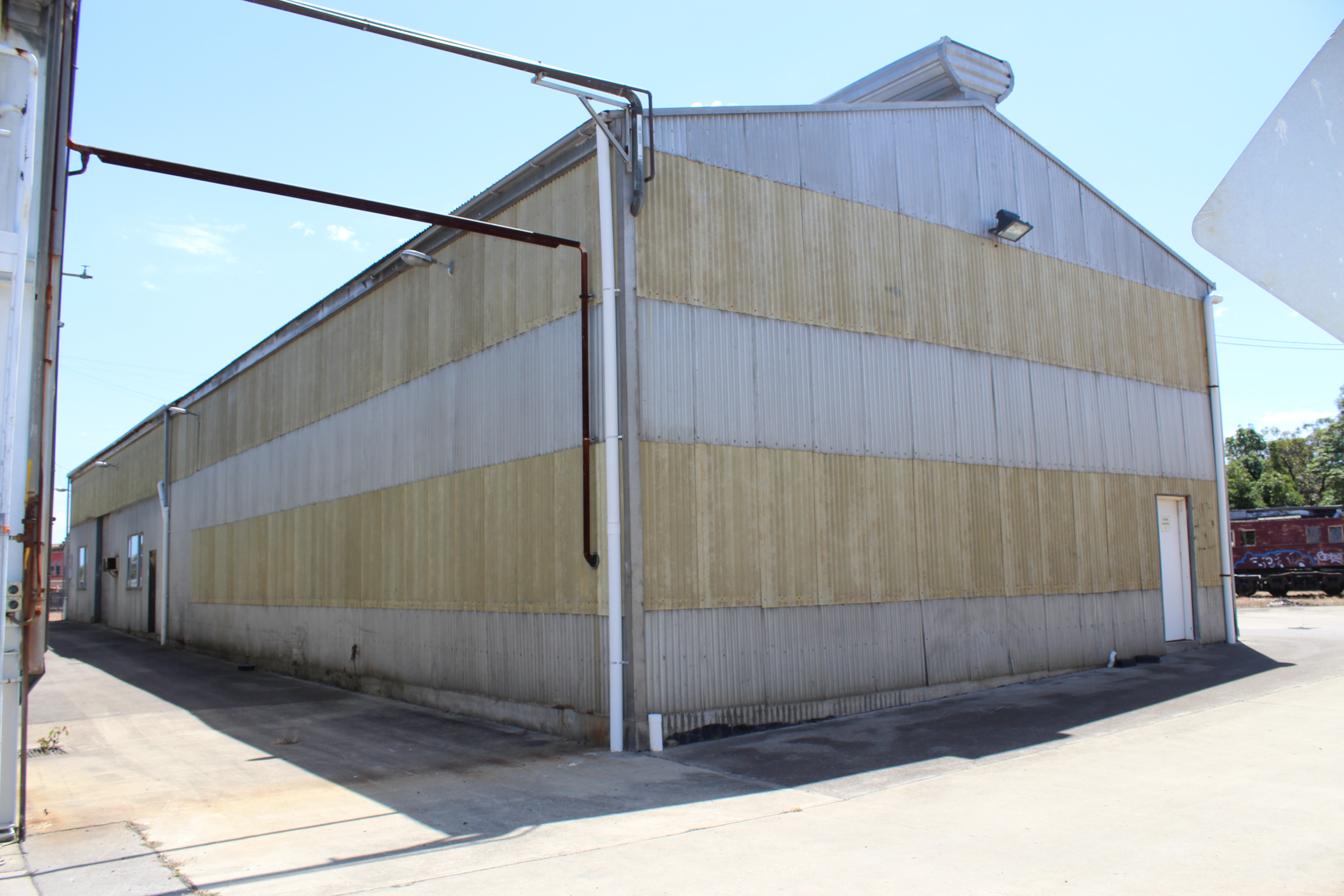
Workshop and stores building

In 1988, the Carpenters' shop was demolished along with the original 1924 machine shop. The machine shop was however was replaced with a more modern steel framed building transferred from the closed depot at Valley Heights this building was doubled in length and was also used as a store.

In March 1988, tenders were called for the design, manufacture, installation and commissioning of a drop table. This drop table was fitted to No. 4 road in No. 2 shed, as part of this work No. 3 road was removed along with the original drop pits on roads 2 to 5 along with the original inspection pits on roads 1 to 5. The pit on road 5 was replaced by a raised rail with depressed floor type.

In 1990, demolition was completed of the original No. 1 roundhouse building along with the mess room adjacent to No. 2 shed. After the demolition of No. 1 shed, the turntable pit and surrounding radial roads were nominally raised by 470 mm to lessen the effect of groundwater. As part of this raising, all of the servicing pits surrounding No. 1 turntable were in filled. In 1991, further modifications took place to the pits surrounding No. 2 turntable, with the outdoor section of the pits on roads 6 & 7 being infilled so that the pits only ran inside of the shed. The pits on 8 to 10 roads along with the drop pits on roads 8 & 9 were also filled in. The 2 surviving outdoor 'Garratt' inspection pits on roads 25 & 26 were also filled in.

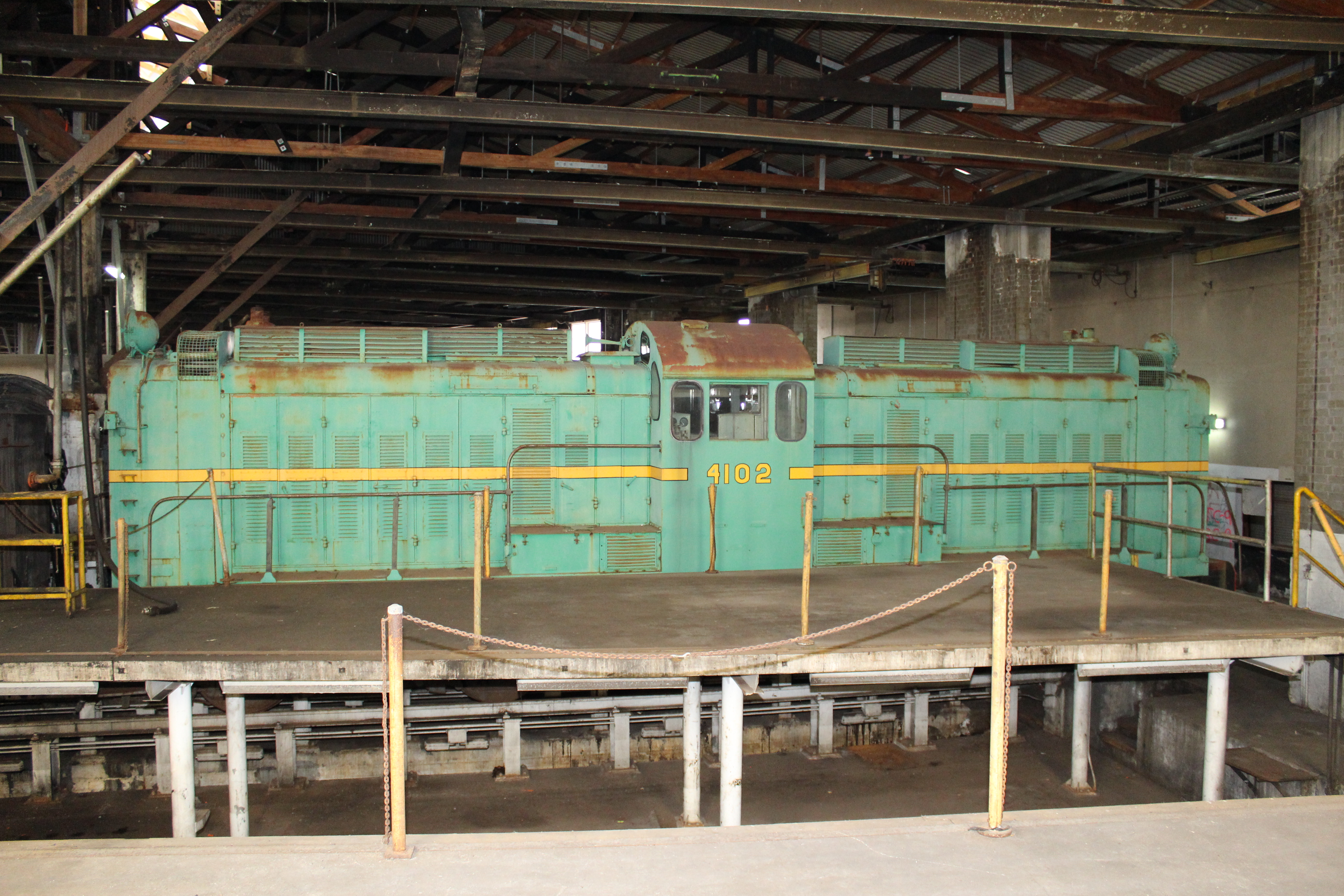
Preserved 4102 stored on No. 20 road of No. 2 shed

=== Closure ===
The introduction in 1994 of the 82 class and 90 class locomotives that were maintained by Clyde Engineering at Kooragang Island and the resulting withdrawal of most of the 44, 45 and 442 class locomotives together with the move to through working by National Rail saw the depot's use further decline with the depot closing on 24 December 1994.

=== The depot since closure ===
In the mid to late 1990s, the State Rail Authority auctioned most of the removable plant at the depot, the pit wheel lathe and crane from the wheel lathe shed, along with the drop table in No. 2 shed, both sanding sheds and the four 81,800 L (18,000 imp gal) diesel fuel tanks were also auctioned off. The machinery in the workshop/store building was also disposed of and the entire building was then used as a store for the neighbouring railcar maintenance centre, this building being the only one at the depot remaining in active railway use.

In 2004, the railcar maintenance centre was extended which required the shortening of some of the No. 2 shed outdoor radial roads, along with the removal of the load box and associated building. The Sydney end arrival road for No. 2 shed was disconnected from the main line and shortened to a normal radial road. The Newcastle end arrival roads for No. 2 shed were disconnected from the main line as well.

The surviving section of the loco depot is heritage listed and is on the New South Wales Section 170 heritage register. In 2009, to make room for redevelopment of the NSW Rail Museum Museum's Thirlmere site, several items of the RailCorp heritage collection that were at Thirlmere along with items that had been previously stored at various locations in Sydney were relocated to Broadmeadow and initially stored around No. 1 turntable. Later in 2009, work commenced in repairing the No. 2 roundhouse and associated turntable to allow the undercover storage of some of the items which had been relocated to Broadmeadow for storage.

In early 2011, due to extensive vandal damage and being outside of the main heritage area the original 1924 concrete drop panel barracks was demolished.

It has been proposed that the site be redeveloped by Transport Heritage NSW as a rail heritage centre. In February 2013, a Hunter Division of Transport Heritage NSW was formed by local members of THNSW with the purpose of looking after the site & items stored there. Other operators such as the Lachlan Valley Railway are also interested in the site.

In May 2017, all volunteer activities on the site by Transport Heritage NSW volunteers was suspended due a number of factors. On 30 November 2018, Transport for New South Wales announced the creation of a new heritage hub at the former Chullora Railway Workshops site. Once the Chullora site is ready, all of items currently stored at Broadmeadow will be moved to Chullora and the Broadmeadow site "will be adapted for new uses" and Transport Heritage NSW will no longer be involved with the Broadmeadow site.

== Description ==
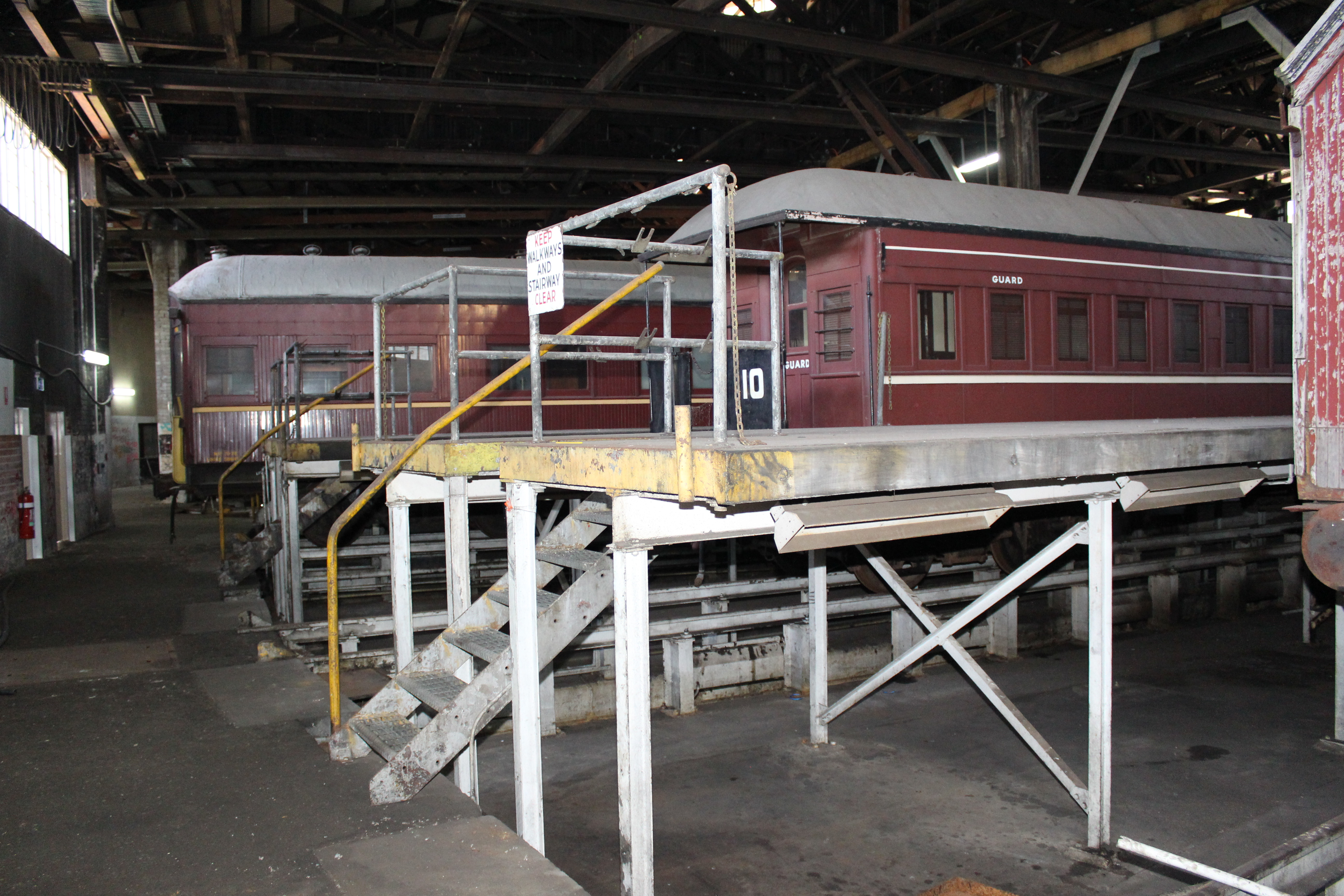
Suburban carriages at the Depot in December 2012

The Broadmeadow Locomotive Depot is a large site on the western (Down) side of the Short North line, south of Broadmeadow Station. The main, western part of the depot contains the former locomotive servicing facilities including two turntables and associated roundhouses (roundhouse #1 has been removed), washing facilities, the former District Engineer's office.

'Inward' and "Departure" roads are arranged to allow for the arrival and departure of locomotives from the complex from south to north past former roundhouse no 1# (Turntable #1 is still extant), past roundhouse #2 and then exiting the site to rejoin the main line. The configuration of the roads have changed over time as the yard layout has evolved. The large 1980s Endeavour servicing centre sits between the roundhouses and the main rail lines and the car parking area for the centre has encroached on the radial roads of roundhouse #2 as well as some of the departure roads.

Surviving buildings at the depot include Roundhouse No 2 (1951–52) and 105' Turntable # 2, (1951–52), the Former District Engineer's Office (1924), 75' Turntable # 1 (1924), the Diesel Refuelling Facility (1971) and additional modern sheds (1990s)

Roundhouse No 2 (1951–52) and 105' Turntable # 2, (1951–52)

The remaining roundhouse and turntable arrangement at Broadmeadow (No. 2 roundhouse) consists of 42 locomotive storage roads laid out in a fan-shape arrangement, radiating from a central turntable, which is a typical track arrangement for roundhouses. The roundhouse building is semi-circular in plan, providing cover over 21 radiating roads with the remaining roads plus the access/egress roads being uncovered. Principal dimensions: Length of side wall (i.e. from front doorway to rear wall of roundhouse): 90 feet. Approx. outside diameter of semi-circle scribed by roundhouse: 400 feet This building covered roads that were formerly open air roads and the electrically driven 105 ft turntable replaced the original manually operated 75 ft turntable.

The roundhouse has a symmetrically peaked roof, centrally placed, with smoke chutes above each shed road on the outer roof section and a skylight at the ridge. The end walls are constructed in brick in English bond. The roof is supported on reinforced concrete columns with steel and metal roof framing. The outer walls of the building and the end walls have large glass windows. There are some extant metal doors between columns facing the turntable.

Internally, the flooring is generally concrete, with inspection pits and access steps provided to allow inspection beneath locomotives. The access pits were modified with the introduction of diesel engines. There are also raised work platforms for access to upper levels of the locomotives for maintenance and repairs. Within this building, there were offices and stores at the northern end of the structure and there is also a compressor shed at the southern end with some remnant equipment inside.

Other equipment associated with the locomotive depot includes a 105-foot diameter electrically powered turntable and a number of small workshop and administrative buildings. The turntable pre-dates the roundhouse but the equipment was upgraded when the shed was built. A conservation project for the roundhouse and turntable commenced in mid 2009.

Former District Engineers Office (1924)

Located in the centre of the western portion of the site is the Former District Engineers office, also referred to as the District Manager's building and the Divisional Locomotive Engineers office. This building is an interesting single storey drop-concrete-slab building with corrugated metal hipped roof which extends to form a timber-framed deep veranda on three sides with concrete floors. The rear of the building has a double hipped roof with a north–south valley gutter. On one verandah is a lower window, apparently used for the collection of wages by staff.

This form of construction is based around the use of prefabricated concrete slabs dropped between prefabricated slotted concrete studs to form external walls, with gaps provided between studs for window and door openings. This form of construction was commonly used in railway sites during the early 20th century.

Along the northern elevation is a group of tall cypress trees, possibly originally planted as a hedge.

The interior of this building is very simple with the external walls lined between the concrete studs and internal lightweight walls clad in plasterboard. All ceilings are fibre-cement with battens and plaster ceiling roses. Floors are timber, some covered with linoleum. All windows are timber-framed double-hung sash windows with timber architraves and sills. This building is in very poor condition, with much evidence of termite infestation, all windows boarded up (many broken).

Turntable #1 (1924)

Dating from 1924, turntable # 1 is located almost directly west of turntable # 2. It is an electric turntable, still functioning. The turntable was raised when the roundhouse was demolished in the 1990. The electrical drive equipment was removed after the depot was closed, but a replacement drive cabin & motor (currently non operational) was fitted to the turntable in 2016.

Refuelling Facility (1971)

Located east of and adjacent to Turntable # 2, is a metal framed structure, clad in corrugated iron, comprising two bays for refuelling.

Additional modern sheds (1990s)

Located between the two turn turntables are a cluster of modern structures, all constructed in metal with gabled metal roofs. These buildings are generally used as storage sheds. One structure is long and thing in plan, open at both ends with high level mezzanines and a central pit for cleaning of rolling stock. Other demountable buildings are also located within the vicinity of the Endeavour Centre. These structures have little/nil heritage significance.

Landscape features

South west of Turntable # 2 is a row of Canary Island date palms, following the line of the tracks.

Potential archaeological features

There are likely to be numerous pits, services and sections of former roads across the site. A number of features have been removed from the site including the large coal stage, locomotive watering facilities including tanks and water spouts, the Arnott's siding and roundhouse #1, although some archaeological evidence of these may remain. The Chargemen's office, boilerhouse for the steam cleaning station and the machine shop were in the area now occupied by the Endeavour Workshop and little evidence of these is likely to survive.

The Broadmeadow Locomotive Depot retains a moderate degree of integrity.

Although the aesthetic and technical significance of the site as a whole is diminished by the loss of the original 1924 roundhouse, the majority of the principal elements of the site are extant.

== Heritage listing ==
The Broadmeadow Locomotive Depot has state heritage significance. Broadmeadow Depot was the main servicing hub for steam locomotives in the northern part of NSW during this time, having replaced Hamilton Depot in this function, and was the last depot in NSW to run regular steam train services.

The extensive site contains a range of buildings and works that demonstrate the operation of the site and the changing technology from steam to diesel over a period of 80 years. In particular the roundhouses demonstrate the shift after 1890 from the English model of using through-houses for locomotive maintenance, to the American practice of using roundhouses. Although a number of elements of the depot have been removed, the site is still able to demonstrate its significance through the grouping of the turntables, 1951-52 roundhouse, in and out roads and District Engineer's office. The site physically demonstrates a former age of locomotive servicing that no longer occurs.

The Broadmeadow number 2 roundhouse is relatively rare in NSW. Although a number of roundhouses were built throughout the state, only seven roundhouses (or part roundhouses) are extant, and the Broadmeadow number 2 roundhouse and turntable are one of the largest remaining in NSW. The rarity value of the Broadmeadow complex is increased by the fact there were two roundhouses on the same site and that both turntables survive. It is still able to demonstrate this intensive use despite the loss of the superstructure of the 1924 roundhouse and the encroachment of the Endeavour Centre on the radial roads of the 1951-52 roundhouse. It is the only railway complex in NSW to retain two side by side turntables and both are in working order.

Broadmeadow Railway Locomotive Depot was listed on the New South Wales State Heritage Register on 2 April 1999, based on satisfying the criteria of historical significance and of rarity, being one of the few surviving examples of such a facility out of over a hundred built.
