= Paxman (engines) =

Diesel engine brand in Britain

- Industry: Diesel engines brand
- Founded: 1865
- Founders: James Noah Paxman; Henry Davey; Charles Davey
- Defunct: 2021
- Headquarters: Colchester, England
- Parent: MAN Energy Solutions
- Website: MAN-ES-Paxman

Paxman was a major British brand of diesel engines. Ownership has changed on a number of occasions from the company's formation in 1865, and the brand is now part of MAN Energy Solutions. At its peak, the Paxman works covered 23 acres (9.3 ha) and employed over 2,000 people. Early Paxman diesel engines (with "Comet" indirect injection cylinder heads, designed by Sir Harry Ricardo) carried the name Paxman Ricardo.

== History ==
=== Davey Paxman ===
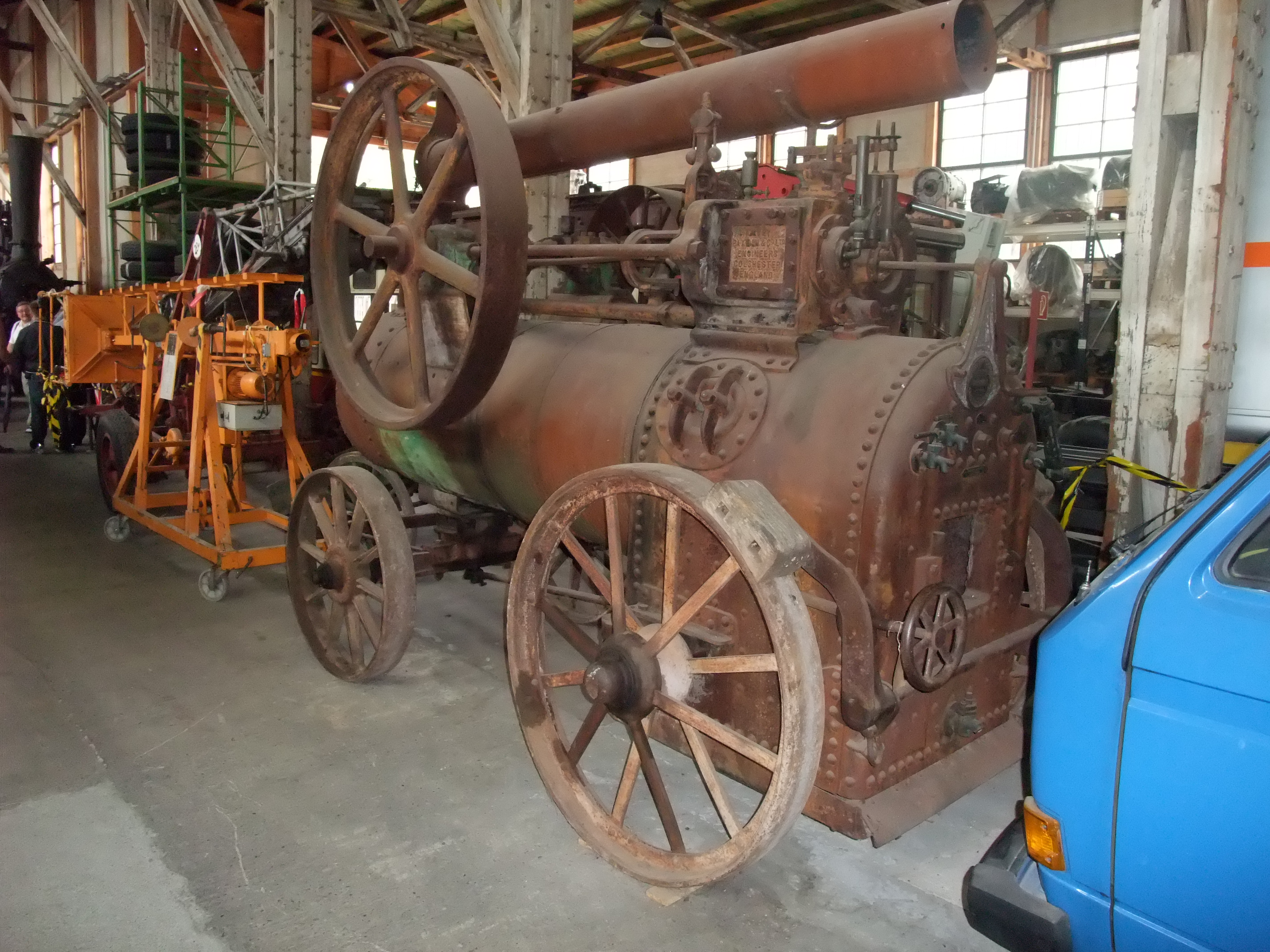
Davey Paxman & Co portable steam engine at Depot Monumentenhalle of Deutsches Technikmuseum Berlin

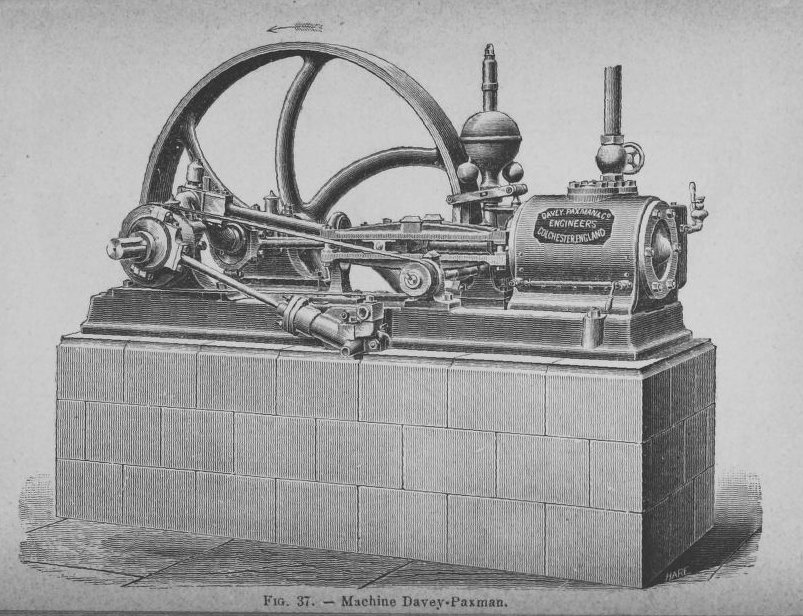
Stationary Davey-Paxman engine from the 1890s.

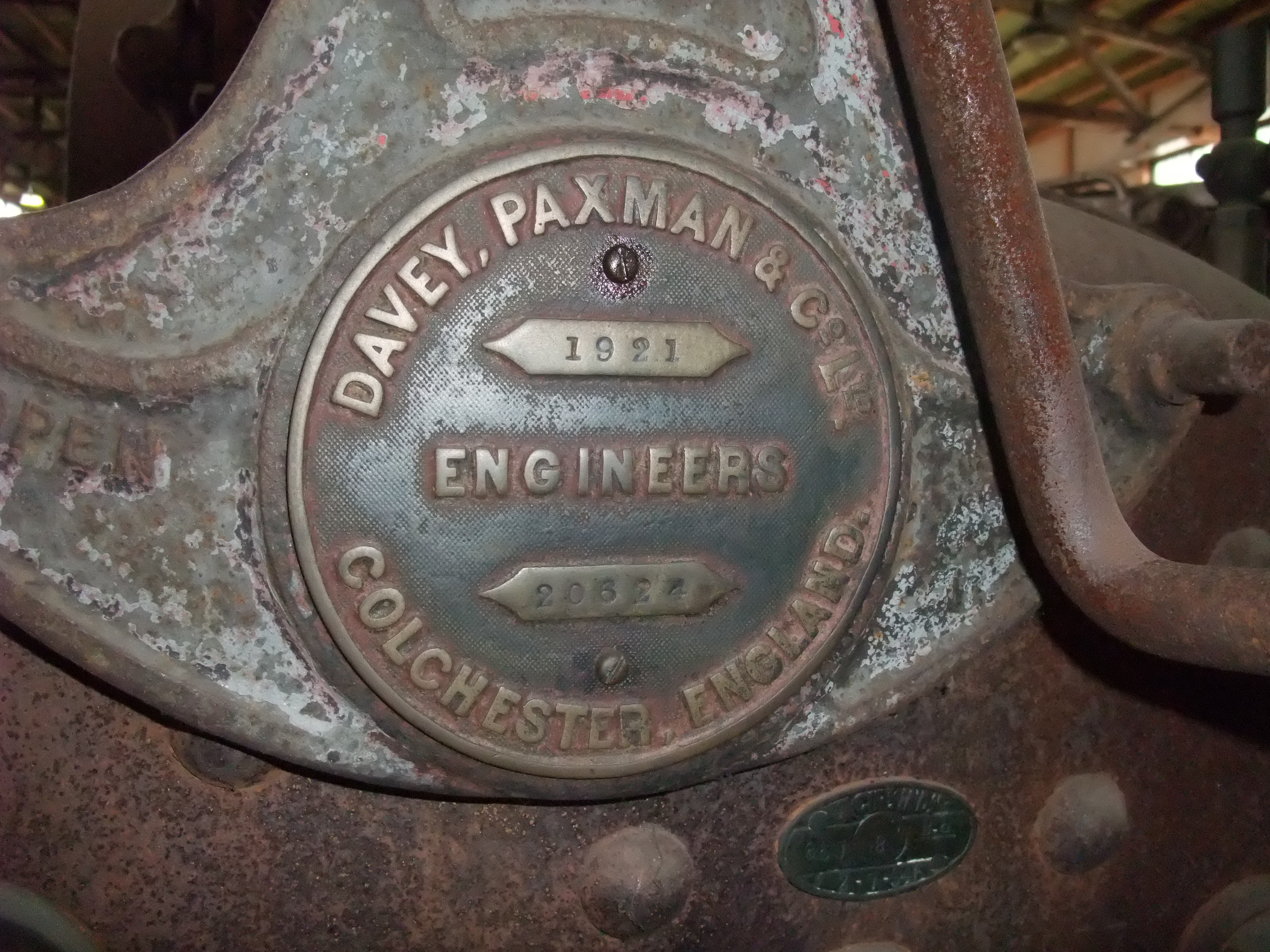
Detail view of same portable engine, showing Paxman builder's plate (dated 1921) on the regulator handle support above the firebox.

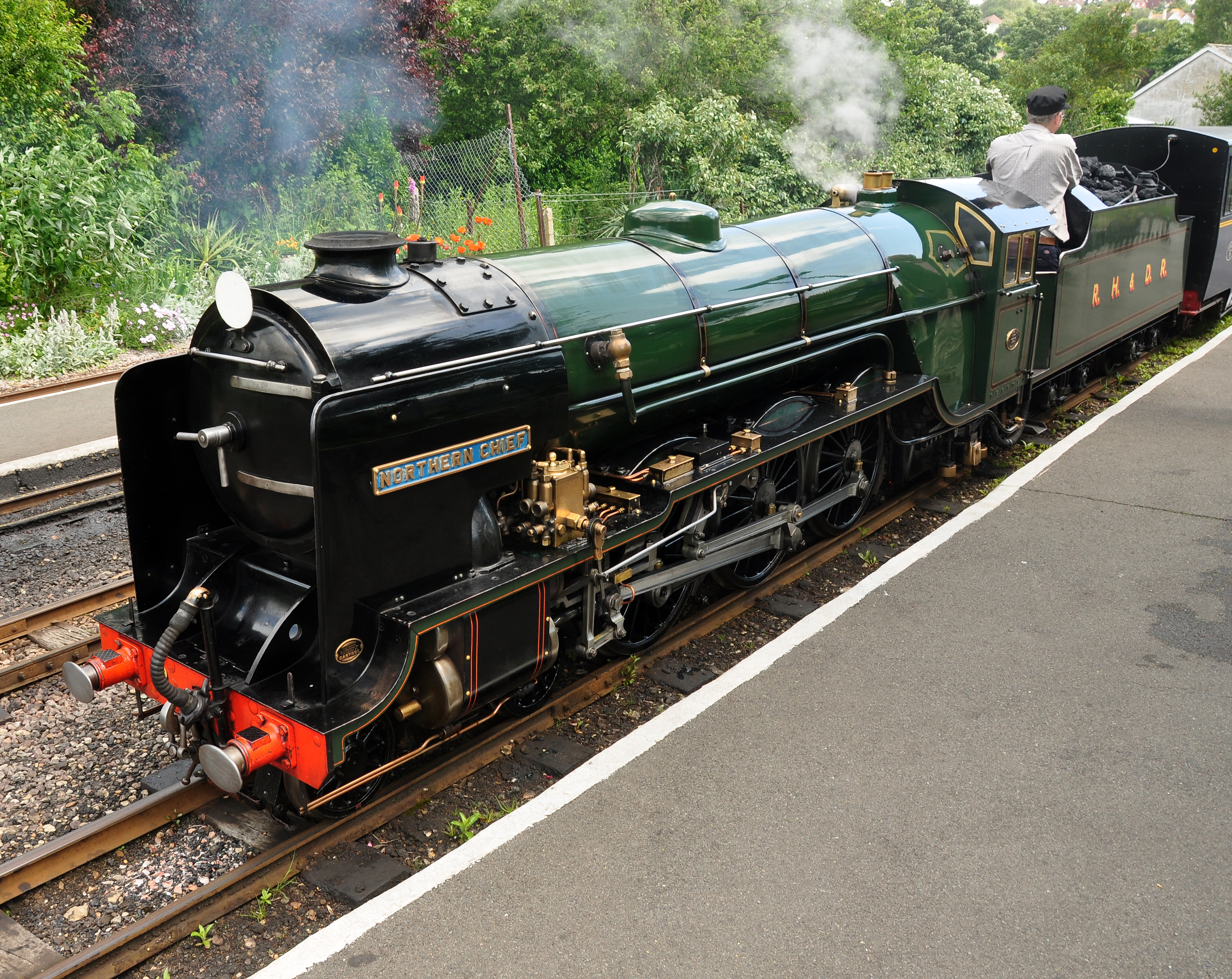
Northern Chief of the Romney, Hythe & Dymchurch Railway built in 1925

Paxman was founded by James Noah Paxman, Henry and Charles Davey as Davey, Paxman & Davey, Engineers in 1865, later Davey, Paxman & Co. which became a limited company in 1898. In 1920 the company became a member of the Agricultural & General Engineers (AGE) combine. In 1932 AGE collapsed and Paxman emerged as Davey Paxman & Co (Colchester) Ltd.

Davey, Paxman and Davey conducted business as general engineers and ironworkers. The company manufactured steam engines, boilers, agricultural machinery, and mill gearing. By the early 1870s the company was supplying machinery to the Kimberley diamond mines in South Africa.

For an 11 year period starting 1906 the company built and sold traction engines with a bit under 90 being built.

=== Ruston-Paxman ===
In 1940, Ruston & Hornsby purchased a controlling interest in the company; this co-operation led to the formation of Ruston-Paxman Group.

During World War II Paxman supplied diesel engines for various naval vessels such as e.g., the British U-class submarine and the British V-class submarine.

In 1954, the engine controls business of Paxman was reformed as a subsidiary, Ardleigh Engineering. In 1962, Paxman acquired the engine controls division of the Curtiss-Wright Corporation and merged the two businesses under the Regulateurs Europa name.

=== English Electric and GEC ===
In 1966, the Ruston-Paxman Group was acquired by English Electric. The diesel engine businesses were merged into English Electric Diesel Engines Ltd (later English Electric Diesels Ltd). Paxman became the "Paxman Engine Division" of English Electric. In 1968, English Electric was itself acquired by GEC. In 1972, GEC renamed the engines division GEC Diesels Limited. In 1975, a reorganisation saw the creation of Paxman Diesels Limited as a subsidiary.

=== Alstom ===
In 1988, GEC merged its Paxman, Ruston and Mirrlees Blackstone diesels businesses with the Alsthom division of Compagnie Générale d'Electricité (CGE) to form GEC-Alsthom. Paxman became GEC ALSTOM Paxman Diesels Ltd. In December 1997, GEC Alstom had its initial public offering as Alstom. The diesel engine businesses became Alstom Engines Ltd (AEL).

=== MAN B&W Diesel ===
In 2000, Alstom Engines Ltd. was acquired by MAN B&W Diesel to become MAN B&W Diesel Ltd. In 2005, MAN sold the Regulateurs Europa controls business to Heinzmann. In November 2020, MAN announced the Colchester factory would close with the remaining Paxman products to be supported by MAN Energy Solutions's Hazel Grove facility, the former Mirrlees Blackstone factory.

== Diesel engines ==
=== Paxman ===
Pre-1934 designs:

- VZ, used in LMS 7054

Post-1934 designs (indirect injection):

- RP, used in British Rail 10100, British Rail 10800, British Rail 11001, British Rail Class D2/1, British Rail Class 07, Western Australian Government Railways Y class, New South Wales Government Railways 41 class
- Hi-Dyne, a variant of the RPHXL using controlled turbocharging to provide a constant output power across the whole speed range.

Post-1952 designs (direct injection)

- YH, used in British Rail Class 15 and British Rail Class 16
- ZH, used in British Rail Class 17
- YJ Ventura, used in Type 42 destroyer, British Rail Class 14, British Rail Class 29, British Rail Class 74
- Y3J (later RP200) Valenta, used in Type 22 frigate, Type 23 frigate, Invincible-class aircraft carrier, Upholder/Victoria-class submarine, British Rail Class 43 (HST), New South Wales XPT
- VP185, used in British Rail Class 43 (HST), New South Wales XPT

=== Ruston-Paxman ===
Examples of Ruston-Paxman diesel engines:

- RK3, used in British Rail Class 56, British Rail Class 58
