= WAGR Y class =

Australian diesel-electric locomotives

Western Australian Government Railways Y class
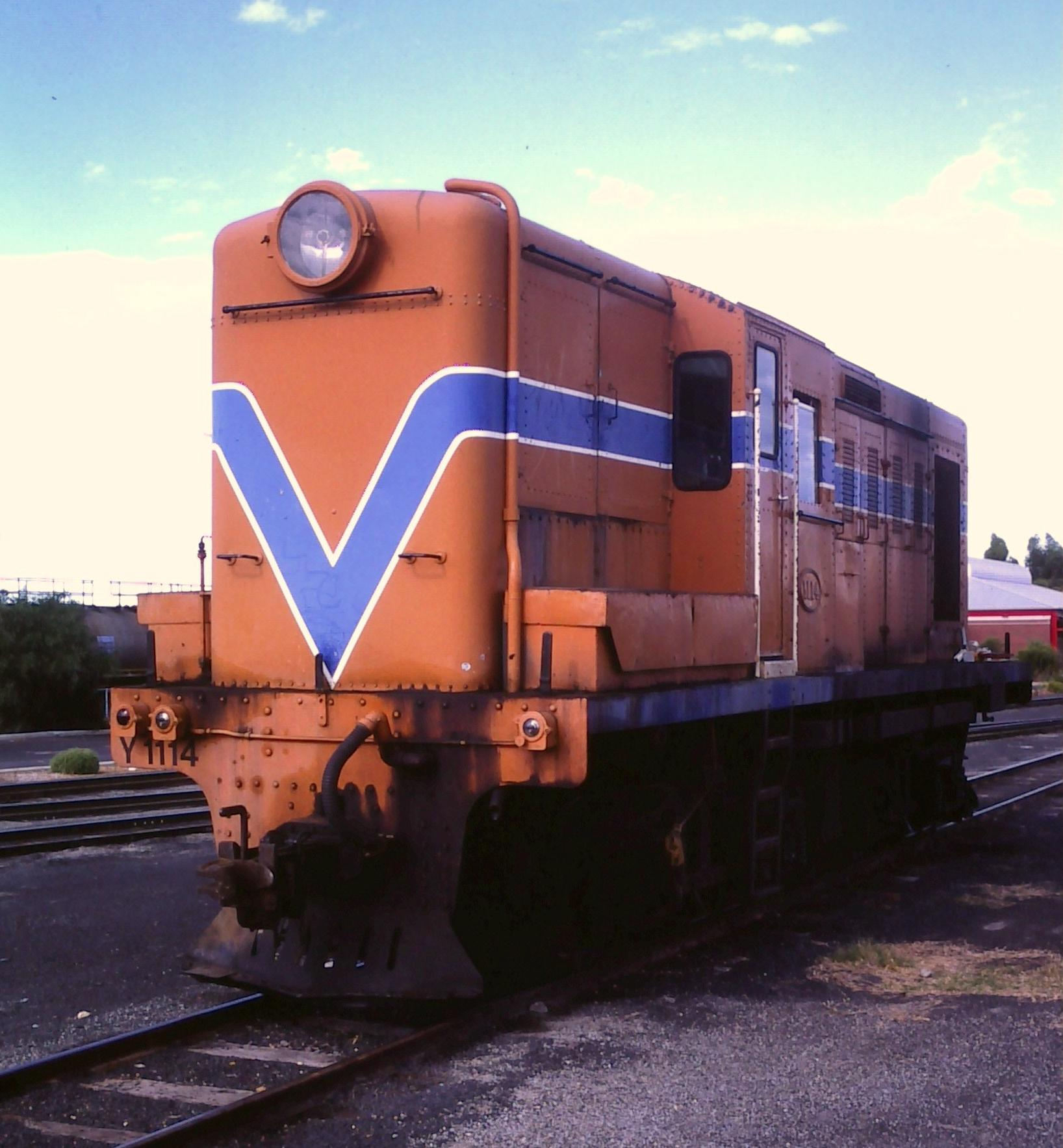
- Y1114 at Picton Yard in December 1986
Type and origin
- Power type: Diesel-electric
- Builder: British Thomson-Houston at Clayton Equipment Company
- Serial number: 1011–1028
- Model: British Thomson-Houston 1850
- Build date: 1953–1955
- Total produced: 18
Specifications
- Configuration
  - AAR: B-B
  - UIC: Bo-Bo, Bo′Bo'
- Gauge: 1,067 mm (3 ft 6 in)
- Length: 10.02 m (32 ft 10 in)
- Loco weight: 39 t (38 long tons; 43 short tons)
- Fuel type: Diesel
- Prime mover: Paxman 12RPHL
- Generator: British Thomson-Houston RTB8844
- Traction motors: British Thomson-Houston 124PV, 4 of
Performance figures
- Power output: 306 kW (410 hp)
Career
- Operators: Western Australian Government Railways
- Number in class: 18
- Numbers: Y1101-Y1118
- First run: November 1953
- Preserved: Y1101, Y1102, Y1107, Y1108, Y1114, Y1115, Y1116
- Disposition: 7 preserved, 11 scrapped

The Y class is a class of 18 diesel locomotives built by British Thomson-Houston and Clayton Equipment Company for the Western Australian Government Railways between 1953 and 1955. British Thomson-Houston supplied the electrical control equipment but the mechanical work, assembly and testing was carried out by Clayton Equipment Company at their premises in Hatton, Derbyshire. The locomotives carried separate builders plates for each company.

They were used as shunters, primarily in Perth and Fremantle although some did haul freight services in the Geraldton and Pinjarra areas.

They were withdrawn by 1990 with seven being preserved:

- 1101 at the Railway Museum, Bassendean (as of January 2024)
- 1102, 1107, 1114, 1115 at the Pemberton Tramway Station (as of August 2023)
- 1108 at the Boulder Railway Station, Kalgoorlie (as of September 2023)
- 1116 at the South West Rail & Heritage Centre, Boyanup (as of February 2023)
