= New South Wales 41 class locomotive =

Class of Australian diesel-electric locomotives

New South Wales 41 class
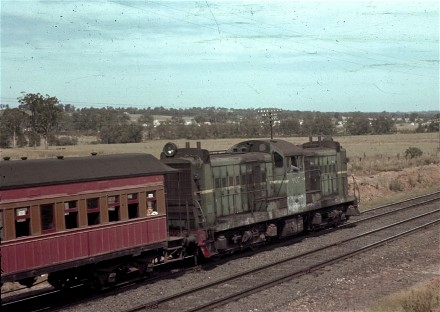
- 4105 heading for Campbelltown in March 1961
Type and origin
- Power type: Diesel-electric
- Builder: British Thomson-Houston, Rugby, United Kingdom
- Build date: 1953/54
- Total produced: 10
Specifications
- Configuration
  - UIC: Bo'Bo'
- Gauge: 4 ft 8 1/2 in (1,435 mm) standard gauge
- Wheel diameter: 42 in (1,067 mm)
- Length: Over headstocks: 43 ft 0 in (13.11 m), Over coupler pulling faces: 47 ft 3 in (14.40 m)
- Width: 9 ft 4 in (2.84 m)
- Height: 14 ft 0 in (4.27 m)
- Axle load: 20 long tons 10 cwt (45,900 lb or 20.8 t)
- Loco weight: 82 long tons 0 cwt (183,700 lb or 83.3 t)
- Fuel type: Diesel
- Fuel capacity: 500 imp gal (2,300 L; 600 US gal)
- Lubricant cap.: 45 imp gal (200 L; 54 US gal) per engine
- Coolant cap.: 40 imp gal (180 L; 48 US gal) per engine
- Sandbox cap.: 11.5 cu ft (0.33 m^{3})
- Prime mover: Paxman 12-RPHL, 2 of
- RPM range: 680-1300
- Engine type: Four-stroke, V12, diesel
- Aspiration: Normally aspirated
- Generator: British Thomson-Houston RTB 10844
- Traction motors: British Thomson-Houston 157AZ, 4 of
- Cylinders: 12
- Cylinder size: 7 in × 7.75 in (178 mm × 197 mm)
Performance figures
- Maximum speed: 57 mph (92 km/h)
- Power output: Gross: 400 hp (298 kW) per engine, For traction: 360 hp (268 kW) per engine
- Tractive effort: Continuous: 22,800 lbf (101.42 kN) at 11 mph (18 km/h)
Career
- Operators: NSW Department of Railways
- Number in class: 10
- Numbers: 4101-4110
- First run: 30 October 1953
- Withdrawn: 30 June 1975
- Preserved: 4102
- Disposition: 1 preserved, 9 scrapped

The 41 class are a class of diesel locomotives built by British Thomson-Houston in the United Kingdom for the New South Wales Department of Railways in 1953 and 1954.

== History ==
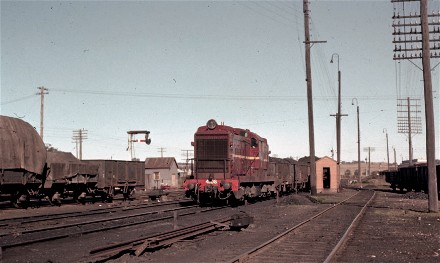
4108 brings a coal train from Narellan into Campbelltown

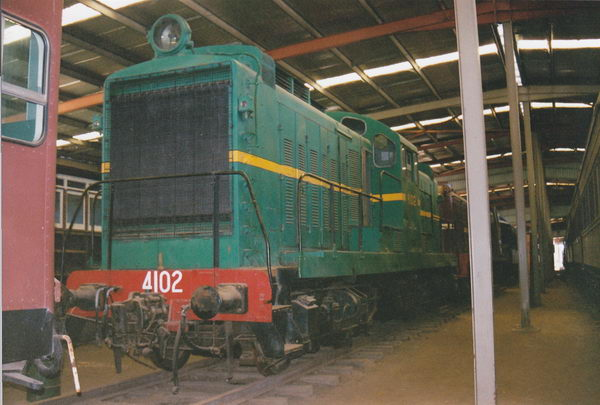
4102 at the New South Wales Rail Transport Museum, Thirlmere in 2001

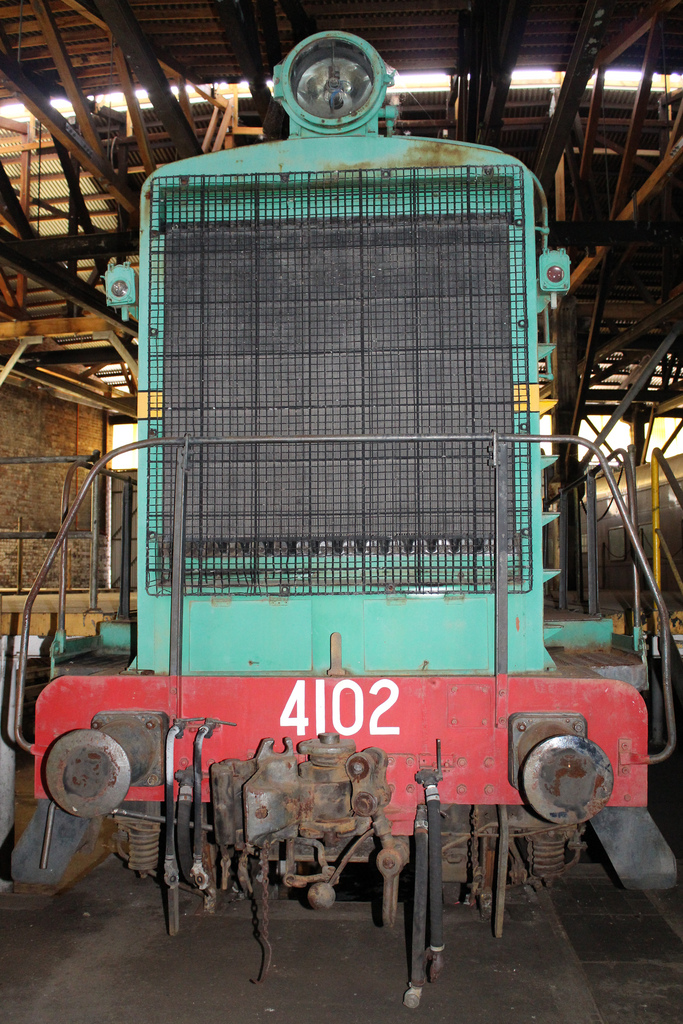
4102 in storage at Broadmeadow Locomotive Depot in December 2012

In 1950, the New South Wales Government Railways ordered 10 diesel locomotives from Australian General Electric. The construction was sublet to British Thomson-Houston of Rugby in the United Kingdom with the body built by Metro Cammell, Birmingham. The first entered service in December 1953 and the last in February 1955. All were delivered painted in verdant green, in the 1960s all were repainted Indian red.

From their earliest days, the locomotives suffered failures including overheating and fires. To try and overcome this the radiators were relocated further to the ends of all ten of the locomotives and air ducting was modified. In addition, two had their mufflers relocated. The modification was considered a success, but not rolled out across the rest of the class. The locomotives were equipped to operate in multiple however the cooling system layout saw radiator heat passing from the leading locomotive to the trailing one, resulting in the equipment being removed.

By the early 1960s with the twin Paxman 12-RPHL engines coming to the end of their useful life, the Mechanical Branch began looking at repowering options. With the cost of repowering and overhauling the Class 41s being two-thirds that of a new Class 48 and repair costs per mile over nine times greater, it was decided not to proceed with this.

One was set aside in December 1957 following two electrical fires, the second in April 1961, the third in September 1969, while overhauls ceased for the rest of the class in 1972 with each locomotive withdrawn as it suffered a major failure, the final locomotive being withdrawn in June 1975. The class were mainly confined to metropolitan Sydney operating local trip workings and shunting at Enfield yard.

== Preservation ==
In December 1976, 4102 was placed by the Public Transport Commission in the custody of the NSW Rail Museum and is now a designated NSW heritage item.

After it arrived at Thirlmere in January 1977, the seized engine that led to its demise was temporarily repaired by members of the Illawarra Group. In 1982, an engine failed whilst returning from a trip to Picton and as a consequence 4102 was then used as a one-engine shunter until the batteries finally wore out in 1987.

By July 1991, it had moved to CountryLink's XPT Service Centre in Sydenham (where the Paxman engined XPTs are maintained), where a spare engine was installed. It returned to Thirlmere in November 1992, but was not restored to service. In April 2009, 4102 was moved for further storage at the Broadmeadow Locomotive Depot. In May 2023 it was moved to the Heritage Hub at Chullora Workshops.

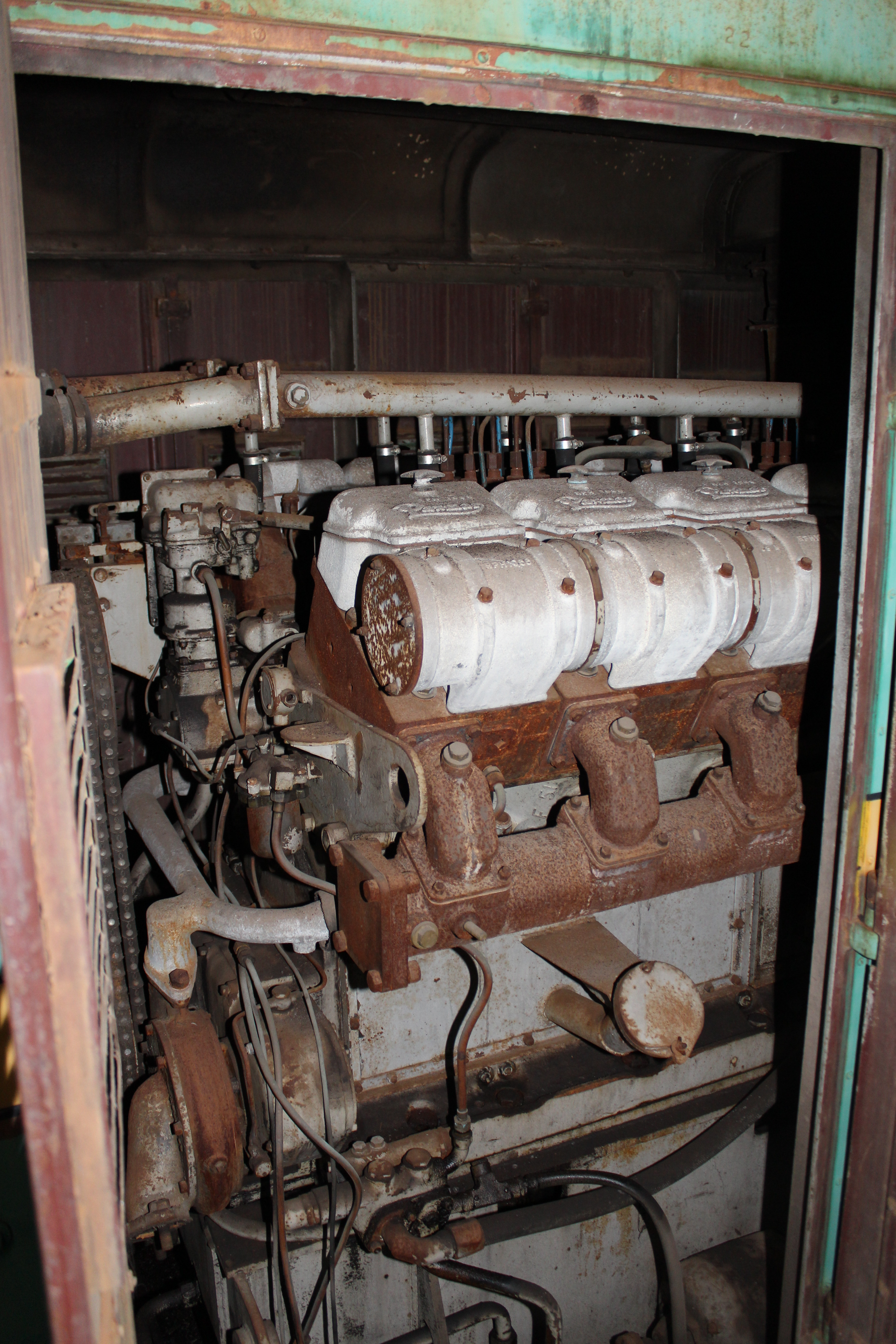
One of the Paxman diesel engines of 4102 as stored at Broadmeadow Locomotive Depot

== Status table ==
Number	Serial No	Entered service	Last Used	Withdrawn	Condemned	Scrapped	Kilometres Travelled
4101	1001	1 Dec 1953	6 Jun 1973	27 Jun 1973	2 Sep 1974	11 Jun 1975	463,514
4102	1002	30 Oct 1953	30 Jun 1975	19 Jul 1975	1 Dec 1975	Preserved THNSW	492,650
4103	1003	18 Jan 1954	2 Apr 1974	16 May 1974	2 Sep 1974	1 Sep 1975	462,871
4104	1004	13 Jan 1954	12 Oct 1973	26 Mar 1974	2 Sep 1974	29 Aug 1975	440,810
4105	1005	8 Feb 1954	31 Mar 1961	01 Apr 1961	May 1973	5 Oct 1972	149,281
4106	1006	21 Jan 1954	02 Jan 1958	05 Jan 1958	May 1973	27 Apr 1973	106,909
4107	1007	25 Jan 1954	11 Aug 1973	26 Mar 1974	2 Sep 1974	29 Aug 1975	446,167
4108	1008	22 Feb 1954	10 Sep 1969	10 Sep 1969	May 1973	20 Oct 1972	402,026
4109	1009	11 Mar 1954	9 Feb 1972	27 Jun 1973	2 Sep 1974	4 Jun 1975	426,074
4110	1010	10 Feb 1955	20 May 1974	25 May 1974	2 Sep 1974	1 Sep 1975	476,489
