= British Rail Class 29 =

British diesel-electric locomotive

British Railways Class 29
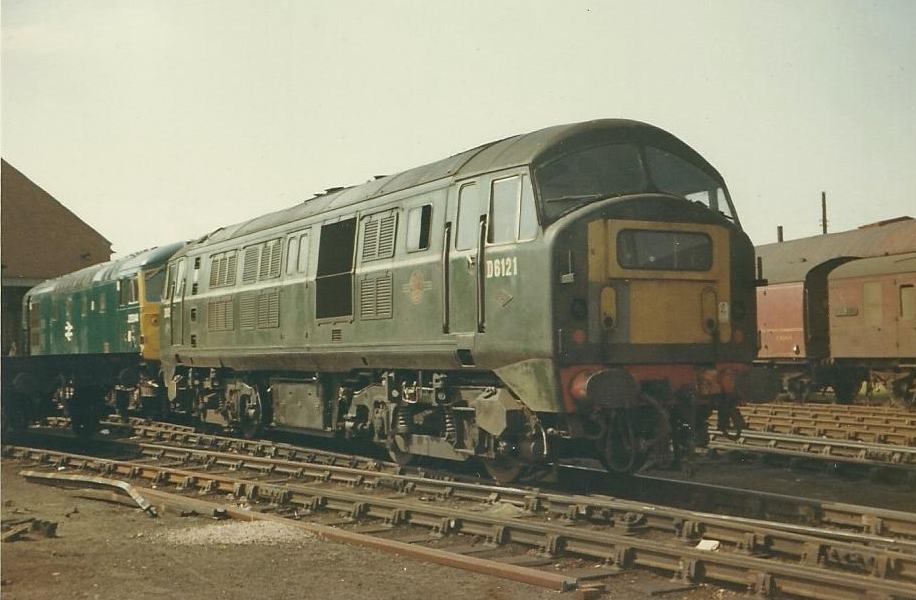
- D6121 in BR green livery with white stripe and large yellow warning panel and headcode at Inverness MPD, August 1968
Type and origin
- Power type: Diesel-electric
- Builder: North British Locomotive Co.
- Build date: 1958–1960 (original Class 21)
- Rebuilder: Paxman
- Rebuild date: Rebuilt: 1963, 1965–1967
- Number rebuilt: 20
Specifications
- Configuration
  - UIC: Bo'Bo'
  - Commonwealth: Bo-Bo
- Gauge: 4 ft 8 1/2 in (1,435 mm) standard gauge
- Wheel diameter: 3 ft 7 in (1.092 m)
- Minimum curve: 3.5 chains (231.00 ft; 70.41 m)
- Wheelbase: 37 ft 0 in (11.28 m)
- Length: 51 ft 6 in (15.70 m)
- Width: 8 ft 8 in (2.64 m)
- Height: 12 ft 8 in (3.86 m)
- Loco weight: 73 long tons (74.2 t; 81.8 short tons)
- Fuel capacity: 460 imp gal (2,100 L; 550 US gal)
- Prime mover: Paxman Ventura
- Engine type: V12 diesel
- Generator: DC generator
- Traction motors: 4 GEC DC motors
- Transmission: Diesel electric
- MU working: ● Red Circle
- Train heating: Steam
- Train brakes: Vacuum
Performance figures
- Maximum speed: 80 mph (130 km/h)
- Power output: Engine: 1,350 hp (1,010 kW)
- Tractive effort: Maximum: 45,000 lbf (200 kN)
- Brakeforce: 50 long tons-force (498 kN)
Career
- Operators: British Rail
- Numbers: D6100–03/06–08/12–14/16/19, D6121/23/24/29/30/32/33/37
- Axle load class: Route availability 6 (RA 5 from 1969)
- Retired: 1969–1971
- Disposition: All scrapped

The British Rail Class 29 were a class of 20 diesel-electric Bo-Bo locomotives produced by the re-engining of the NBL Type 2 units. The units were designed for both passenger and freight trains.

== Background ==
The machines were produced from 1963 onwards from the North British Type 2 (later Class 21 under TOPS) by replacing the original unreliable licence-built MAN engines of the Class 21s with Paxman Ventura V12 engines at Paxman's Colchester works.

The first unit to be re-engined was D6123, a further 19 machines were re-engined in 1965–1967 at Glasgow Works and mostly Inverurie Works, along with other modifications including the fitting of four-character headcode displays in the nose ends (D6123 retained its original front ends and so did not receive a headcode panel). After rebuilding, they returned to service from Eastfield depot in Glasgow. The allocation of all twenty locomotives in August 1967 was Eastfield.

== Withdrawal ==
Although these offered more power and much improved reliability over the original Class 21s, they did not survive much longer, due to their small class size and the use of a non-standard high-speed diesel engine. D6108 was withdrawn in May 1969 and scrapped by McWilliams of Shettleston in 1971, while the other 19 were withdrawn between April and December 1971 and scrapped at BR's Glasgow Works in 1971–72. No Class 21, 22 or Class 29 locomotives survive today.

== Numbering ==
The rebuilt locomotives were numbered:

- D6100
- D6101
- D6102
- D6103
- D6106
- D6107
- D6108
- D6112
- D6113
- D6114
- D6116
- D6119
- D6121
- D6123
- D6124
- D6129
- D6130
- D6132
- D6133
- D6137

== Model railways ==
In 1978 Hornby Railways launched its first version of the BR Class 29 in BR green and blue liveries in OO gauge. Dapol have more recently produced a Class 29 in multiple liveries.

== Sources ==
- Stevens-Stratten, S.W.; Carter, R.S. (1978). British Rail Main-Line Diesels. Shepperton: Ian Allan Ltd. ISBN 0-7110-0617-2.
- Sugden, S.A. (April 1994). Diesel & Electric Loco Register (3rd edn). Sheffield: Platform 5. ISBN 1-872524-55-9.
- Grindlay, Jim (2006). British Railways Locomotive Allocations 1948-1968 (Part 6 - Diesel & Electric Locomotives). Troon: Modelmaster Publications. ISBN 978-0-9544264-6-0.
- Ian Allan ABC of British Railways Locomotives, summer 1966 edition
