= List of locomotives saved from Woodham Brothers scrapyard =

Below is a list of the locomotive types saved at Woodham Brothers scrapyard, Barry Island, Wales. They are shown by class, indicating how many of each class were saved. Altogether, 213 engines were saved.

== Locomotive types ==
GWR classes (98 in total)

- 6 GWR 2800 Class 2-8-0 - No. 2807 was the oldest locomotive to leave Woodham's for preservation in January 1981.
- 9 GWR 2884 Class 2–8–0
- 5 GWR 4073 Class Castle class 4–6–0
- 5 GWR 4200 Class 2-8-0T
- 2 GWR 4300 Class 2-6-0 - No. 5322 was the first GWR locomotive to leave Woodham's for preservation in March 1969.
- 2 GWR 4500 Class 2-6-2T
- 11 GWR 4575 Class 2-6-2T - No. 5553 was the last locomotive to leave Woodham's for preservation in January 1990.
- 11 GWR 4900 Class Hall class 4–6–0
- 10 GWR 5101 Class 2-6-2T
- 3 GWR 5205 Class 2-8-0T
- 8 GWR 5600 Class 0-6-2T
- 6 GWR 5700 Class 0-6-0PT
- 2 GWR 6000 Class King class 4–6–0
- 6 GWR 6959 Class Modified Hall class 4–6–0
- 3 GWR 7200 Class 2-8-2T
- 8 GWR 7800 Class Manor class 4–6–0
- 1 GWR 9400 Class 0-6-0PT

Midland classes (1)

- 1 Midland Railway 3835 Class - No. (4)3924 was the first locomotive to leave Woodham's for preservation in September 1968. It is also the only surviving member of its class left in existence.

Somerset & Dorset Joint Railway classes (2)

- 2 S&DJR 7F 2-8-0 - No. 53808 was the first S&DJR locomotive to leave Woodham's for preservation in October 1970.

LMS classes (32)

- 6 LMS Stanier Class 5 4-6-0 Black 5
- 2 LMS Jubilee Class 4–6–0
- 6 LMS Stanier Class 8F 2–8–0
- 2 LMS Hughes Crab 2–6–0
- 1 LMS Stanier Mogul 2-6-0 - No. 13268/(4)2968 is now the only surviving member of its class left in existence.
- 7 LMS Fowler Class 3F Jinty 0-6-0T - No. 47327 was the first LMS locomotive to leave Woodham's for preservation in July 1970
- 4 LMS Ivatt Class 2 2-6-0
- 2 LMS Fowler Class 4F 0–6–0
- 2 LMS Ivatt Class 2 2-6-2T

LNER classes (1)

- 1 LNER Thompson Class B1 4-6-0 - No. 61264 was the first and only LNER locomotive to leave Woodham's for preservation in July 1976

LSWR classes (2)

- 2 LSWR S15 class 4-6-0 - No. 30506 was the first LSWR locomotive to leave Woodham's for preservation in April 1976

SECR classes (1)

- 1 SECR N Class 2-6-0 - No. (3)1874 is the only surviving member of its class left in existence.

SR classes (38)

- 1 SR Class Q 0-6-0 - No. 30541 is the only surviving member of its class left in existence.
- 5 SR S15 Class 4–6–0
- 4 SR U Class 2-6-0 - No 31618 was the first SR locomotive to leave Woodham's for preservation in January 1969
- 10 SR Merchant Navy Class 4–6–2
- 18 SR West Country and Battle of Britain Classes 4-6-2 - of these, ten are examples of the 1950s rebuild locos with Walschaerts valve gear and air-smoothed casing removed. These were the most common steam locomotives to be rescued from Barry Scrapyard.

BR Standard classes (38)

- 4 BR Standard Class 2 2-6-0
- 4 BR Standard Class 4 2-6-0
- 14 BR Standard Class 4 2-6-4T- No. 80079 was the first locomotive of the BR standard range to leave Woodham's for preservation in May 1971. These were the second most common steam locomotives to be rescued from Barry Scrapyard.
- 4 BR Standard Class 4 4-6-0
- 4 BR Standard Class 5 4–6–0
- 1 BR Standard Class 8 4-6-2 71000 Duke of Gloucester - Sole member of its class built.
- 7 BR Standard Class 9F 2-10-0 - No. 92214 was the youngest locomotive to leave Woodham's for preservation in December 1980.

== Preserved locomotives ==
List of locomotives formerly at Woodham Brothers saved for preservation
| Locomotive | Class | Date removed | Location | Status | Notes |
|---|---|---|---|---|---|
Great Western Railway locomotives
| 2807 | GWR 2800 Class | June 1981 | Gloucestershire Warwickshire Railway | Operational | Oldest locomotive to be saved from Woodham's yard |
| 2857 | GWR 2800 Class | August 1975 | Severn Valley Railway | Under Overhaul | |
| 2859 | GWR 2800 Class | October 1987 | Private site | Under restoration | |
| 2861 | GWR 2800 Class | | N/A | Scrapped | One of the "Barry Ten". Parts to 4709 |
| 2873 | GWR 2800 Class | | South Devon Railway | Unrestored | |
| 2874 | GWR 2800 Class | August 1987 | Gloucestershire Warwickshire Railway | Under restoration | |
| 2885 | GWR 2884 Class | March 1981 | Tyseley Locomotive Works | Under restoration | Previously on display at Birmingham Moor Street railway station from 2005 to 2013 |
| 3802 | GWR 2884 Class | September 1984 | Llangollen Railway | Operational | |
| 3803 | GWR 2884 Class | November 1983 | Dartmouth Steam Railway | Under Overhaul | |
| 3814 | GWR 2884 Class | July 1986 | Private Site | Unrestored | Restoration stalled |
| 3822 | GWR 2884 Class | May 1976 | Didcot Railway Centre | Static display | |
| 3845 | GWR 2884 Class | | Private site | Unrestored | |
| 3850 | GWR 2884 Class | March 1984 | Gloucestershire Warwickshire Railway | Operational | |
| 3855 | GWR 2884 Class | August 1987 | East Lancashire Railway | Under restoration | |
| 3862 | GWR 2884 Class | | Northampton & Lamport Railway | Under restoration | |
| 5029; Nunney Castle | GWR 4073 "Castle" Class | May 1976 | Crewe Heritage TMD | Mainline operational | |
| 5043; Earl of Mount Edgcumbe | GWR 4073 "Castle" Class | August 1973 | Tyseley Locomotive Works | Mainline operational | |
| 5051; Earl Bathurst | GWR 4073 "Castle" Class | February 1970 | Didcot Railway Centre | Static Display | Restored with original name Drysllwyn Castle |
| 5080; Defiant | GWR 4073 "Castle" Class | August 1974 | Tyseley Locomotive Works | Under Overhaul | |
| 7027; Thornbury Castle | GWR 4073 "Castle" Class | August 1972 | Great Central Railway | Under restoration | |
| 4247 | GWR 4200 Class | April 1985 | Gloucestershire Warwickshire Railway | Operational | |
| 4248 | GWR 4200 Class | May 1986 | STEAM - Museum of the Great Western Railway | Conserved | Displayed to represent a locomotive under overhaul |
| 4253 | GWR 4200 Class | August 1987 | Kent and East Sussex Railway | Under restoration | |
| 4270 | GWR 4200 Class | July 1985 | Gloucestershire Warwickshire Railway | Stored | |
| 4277 | GWR 4200 Class | June 1986 | Dartmouth Steam Railway | Operational | Named Hercules in preservation |
| 5322 | GWR 4300 Class | March 1969 | Didcot Railway Centre | Static display | |
| 7325 | GWR 4300 Class | August 1975 | Severn Valley Railway | Stored | |
| 4561 | GWR 4500 Class | September 1975 | West Somerset Railway | Under overhaul | |
| 4566 | GWR 4500 Class | August 1970 | Severn Valley Railway | Static display | |
| 4588 | GWR 4575 Class | October 1970 | Peak Rail | Under Overhaul | Has carried the name Trojan in preservation |
| 5521 | GWR 4575 Class | September 1975 | Gwili Railway | Operational | Currently running in London Transport livery as L150. Has worked overseas in preservation |
| 5526 | GWR 4575 Class | July 1985 | South Devon Railway | Operational | |
| 5532 | GWR 4575 Class | March 1981 | Llangollen Railway | Under restoration | |
| 5538 | GWR 4575 Class | January 1987 | The Flour Mill, Forest of Dean | Under restoration | Previously displayed in Barry |
| 5539 | GWR 4575 Class | | Barry Tourist Railway | Under restoration | One of the "Barry Ten" |
| 5541 | GWR 4575 Class | October 1972 | Dean Forest Railway | Stored | |
| 5542 | GWR 4575 Class | September 1975 | South Devon Railway | Awaiting overhaul | Owned by 5542 Ltd |
| 5552 | GWR 4575 Class | June 1986 | Bodmin and Wenford Railway | Operational | |
| 5553 | GWR 4575 Class | January 1990 | Peak Rail | Operational | Last steam locomotive to leave Barry. Owned by Waterman Trust. Operational by 2002. Returned to service December 2021 after a 10-year overhaul. |
| 5572 | GWR 4575 Class | August 1971 | Didcot Railway Centre | Static display | |
| 4920; Dumbleton Hall | GWR 4900 "Hall" Class | June 1976 | South Devon Railway | Static display in Japan | |
| 4930; Hagley Hall | GWR 4900 "Hall" Class | January 1973 | Severn Valley Railway | Operational | |
| 4936; Kinlet Hall | GWR 4900 "Hall" Class | May 1981 | Tyseley Locomotive Works | Under overhaul | |
| 4942; Maindy Hall | GWR 4900 "Hall" Class | April 1974 | Didcot Railway Centre | Rebuilt | Rebuilt as GWR 2900 'Saint' Class 4-6-0 2999 Lady of Legend |
| 4953; Pitchford Hall | GWR 4900 "Hall" Class | February 1984 | Epping Ongar Railway | Operational | |
| 4965; Rood Ashton Hall | GWR 4900 "Hall" Class | October 1970 | Tyseley Locomotive Works | Awaiting Overhaul | Previously numbered as (and thought to be) 4983 Albert Hall |
| 4979; Wooton Hall | GWR 4900 "Hall" Class | October 1986 | Ribble Steam Railway | Under restoration | |
| 5900; Hinderton Hall | GWR 4900 "Hall" Class | June 1971 | Didcot Railway Centre | Static display | |
| 5952; Cogan Hall | GWR 4900 "Hall" Class | September 1981 | Llangollen Railway | Unrestored | |
| 5967; Bickmarsh Hall | GWR 4900 "Hall" Class | August 1987 | Northampton & Lamport Railway | Under restoration | |
| 5972; Olton Hall | GWR 4900 "Hall" Class | May 1981 | Warner Bros. Studios, Leavesden | Static display | Used in the Warner Brothers produced Harry Potter film series |
| 4110 | GWR 5101 Class | May 1979 | East Somerset Railway | Operational | The 100th locomotive to leave Barry. |
| 4115 | GWR 5101 Class | | N/A | Dismantled | One of the ‘Barry Ten’ – boiler to 6634, other parts to 4709. |
| 4121 | GWR 5101 Class | February 1981 | Tyseley Locomotive Works | Under restoration | |
| 4141 | GWR 5101 Class | January 1973 | Epping Ongar Railway | Under Overhaul | |
| 4144 | GWR 5101 Class | April 1974 | Didcot Railway Centre | Operational | |
| 4150 | GWR 5101 Class | May 1974 | Severn Valley Railway | Operational | Returned to steam in June 2026, the 154th ex-Barry locomotive to be restored. |
| 4160 | GWR 5101 Class | August 1974 | Llangollen Railway | Under overhaul | On loan from the West Somerset Railway |
| 5164 | GWR 5101 Class | January 1973 | Tyseley Locomotive Works | Awaiting overhaul | On loan from the Severn Valley Railway |
| 5193 | GWR 5101 Class | August 1979 | West Somerset Railway | Operational | Rebuilt into a 2-6-0 tender locomotive and renumbered 9351. |
| 5199 | GWR 5101 Class | July 1985 | Llangollen Railway | Awaiting overhaul | |
| 5224 | GWR 5205 Class | October 1978 | Peak Rail | Stored | |
| 5227 | GWR 5205 Class | | Didcot Railway Centre | Unrestored | One of the "Barry Ten" |
| 5239 | GWR 5205 Class | June 1973 | East Somerset Railway | Operational | Named Goliath in preservation. On loan from the Dartmouth Steam Railway |
| 5619 | GWR 5600 Class | May 1973 | Swindon and Cricklade Railway | Operational | |
| 5637 | GWR 5600 Class | August 1974 | East Somerset Railway | Awaiting overhaul | |
| 5643 | GWR 5600 Class | September 1971 | Embsay and Bolton Abbey Steam Railway | Under Overhaul | On loan from the Ribble Steam Railway |
| 5668 | GWR 5600 Class | August 1987 | Kent and East Sussex Railway | Unrestored | |
| 6619 | GWR 5600 Class | October 1974 | Kent and East Sussex Railway | Awaiting overhaul | |
| 6634 | GWR 5600 Class | June 1981 | Peak Rail | Under restoration | |
| 6686 | GWR 5600 Class | | Barry Tourist Railway | Under restoration | One of the "Barry Ten" |
| 6695 | GWR 5600 Class | May 1979 | West Somerset Railway | Operational | |
| 3612 | GWR 5700 Class | December 1978 | N/A | Scrapped | Dismantled for spare parts |
| 3738 | GWR 5700 Class | April 1974 | Didcot Railway Centre | Static display | |
| 4612 | GWR 5700 Class | January 1981 | Bodmin and Wenford Railway | Stored | |
| 9629 | GWR 5700 Class | May 1981 | Pontypool and Blaenavon Railway | Under restoration | |
| 9681 | GWR 5700 Class | October 1975 | Dean Forest Railway | Operational | |
| 9682 | GWR 5700 Class | November 1982 | Southall Railway Centre | Under overhaul | Sold to the Dean Forest Railway |
| 6023; King Edward II | GWR 6000 "King" Class | December 1984 | Didcot Railway Centre | Awaiting overhaul | |
| 6024; King Edward I | GWR 6000 "King" Class | March 1973 | West Somerset Railway | Under overhaul | |
| 6960; Raveningham Hall | GWR 6959 "Modified Hall" Class | October 1972 | One:One Collection | Stored | |
| 6984; Owsden Hall | GWR 6959 "Modified Hall" Class | October 1986 | Swindon and Cricklade Railway | Under restoration | |
| 6989; Wightwick Hall | GWR 6959 "Modified Hall" Class | January 1978 | Buckinghamshire Railway Centre | Operational | |
| 6990; Witherslack Hall | GWR 6959 "Modified Hall" Class | November 1975 | Great Central Railway | Operational | |
| 7903; Foremarke Hall | GWR 6959 "Modified Hall" Class | June 1981 | Gloucestershire Warwickshire Railway | Operational | |
| 7927; Willington Hall | GWR 6959 "Modified Hall" Class | | N/A | Dismantled | One of the "Barry Ten". Frames and wheels to 1014, boiler to 6880 |
| 7200 | GWR 7200 Class | September 1981 | Buckinghamshire Railway Centre | Under restoration | |
| 7202 | GWR 7200 Class | April 1974 | Didcot Railway Centre | Under restoration | |
| 7229 | GWR 7200 Class | October 1984 | East Lancashire Railway | Under restoration | |
| 7802; Bradley Manor | GWR 7800 "Manor" Class | November 1979 | Tyseley Locomotive Works | Operational | |
| 7812; Erlestoke Manor | GWR 7800 "Manor" Class | May 1974 | Severn Valley Railway | Operational | |
| 7819; Hinton Manor | GWR 7800 "Manor" Class | January 1973 | Severn Valley Railway | Static display | |
| 7820; Dinmore Manor | GWR 7800 "Manor" Class | September 1979 | Gloucestershire Warwickshire Railway | Stored | |
| 7821; Ditcheat Manor | GWR 7800 "Manor" Class | June 1981 | Swindon Designer Outlet | Static display | On loan from the West Somerset Railway |
| 7822; Foxcote Manor | GWR 7800 "Manor" Class | January 1975 | West Somerset Railway | Under Overhaul | |
| 7827; Lydham Manor | GWR 7800 "Manor" Class | June 1970 | Dartmouth Steam Railway | Operational | |
| 7828; Odney Manor | GWR 7800 "Manor" Class | June 1981 | West Somerset Railway | Operational | Has carried the name Norton Manor in preservation. |
| 9466 | GWR 9400 Class | September 1975 | Buckinghamshire Railway Centre | Awaiting overhaul | |
Southern Railway locomotives
| 30499 | LSWR Urie S15 Class | November 1983 | Watercress Line | Under restoration | |
| 30506 | LSWR Urie S15 Class | April 1976 | Watercress Line | Operational | |
| 30541 | SR Maunsell Q Class | May 1974 | Bluebell Railway | Under Overhaul | |
| 30825 | SR Maunsell S15 Class | November 1986 | North Yorkshire Moors Railway | Under overhaul | Carries the boiler and tender of 30841 |
| 30828 | SR Maunsell S15 Class | March 1981 | Watercress Line | Under overhaul | Named Harry A. Frith in preservation. |
| 30830 | SR Maunsell S15 Class | September 1987 | North Yorkshire Moors Railway | Unrestored | |
| 30841 | SR Maunsell S15 Class | September 1972 | North Yorkshire Moors Railway | Dismantled | Named Greene King in preservation. Boiler and tender on 825 |
| 30847 | SR Maunsell S15 Class | October 1978 | Bluebell Railway | Awaiting overhaul | |
| 31618 | SR Maunsell U Class | January 1969 | Bluebell Railway | Awaiting Overhaul | |
| 31625 | SR Maunsell U Class | March 1980 | Swanage Railway | Stored | Painted as James the Red Engine |
| 31638 | SR Maunsell U Class | July 1980 | Bluebell Railway | Awaiting overhaul | |
| 31806 | SR Maunsell U Class | October 1976 | Swanage Railway | Operational | Originally built as SR K Class No. A806 River Torridge |
| 31874 | SR Maunsell N Class | March 1974 | Swanage Railway | Under overhaul | |
| 34007; Wadebridge | SR Unrebuilt West Country Class | May 1981 | Watercress Line | Under overhaul as of 2026 | |
| 34010; Sidmouth | SR Rebuilt West Country Class | November 1982 | Swanage Railway | Under restoration | |
| 34016; Bodmin | SR Rebuilt West Country Class | July 1972 | Carnforth MPD | Stored | |
| 34027; Taw Valley | SR Rebuilt West Country Class | April 1980 | Severn Valley Railway | Under overhaul | |
| 34028; Eddystone | SR Rebuilt West Country Class | April 1986 | Swanage Railway | Operational | Undergoing works for to convert for use on the mainline |
| 34039; Boscastle | SR Rebuilt West Country Class | January 1973 | Great Central Railway | Under overhaul | |
| 34046; Braunton | SR Rebuilt West Country Class | | Crewe Heritage TMD | Mainline operational | |
| 34053; Sir Keith Park | SR Rebuilt Battle of Britain Class | June 1984 | Spa Valley Railway | Operational | |
| 34058; Sir Frederick Pile | SR Rebuilt Battle of Britain Class | July 1986 | Watercress Line | Unrestored | |
| 34059; Sir Archibald Sinclair | SR Rebuilt Battle of Britain Class | October 1979 | Bluebell Railway | Operational | |
| 34067; Tangmere | SR Unrebuilt Battle of Britain Class | January 1981 | Carnforth MPD | Operational | |
| 34070; Manston | SR Unrebuilt Battle of Britain Class | June 1983 | Swanage Railway | Operational | |
| 34072; 257 Squadron | SR Unrebuilt Battle of Britain Class | November 1984 | Swanage Railway | Operational | |
| 34073; 249 Squadron | SR Unrebuilt Battle of Britain Class | | Carnforth MPD | Unrestored | |
| 34081; 92 Squadron | SR Unrebuilt Battle of Britain Class | November 1976 | Nene Valley Railway | Operational | |
| 34092; City of Wells | SR Unrebuilt West Country Class | October 1971 | East Lancashire Railway | Operational | |
| 34101; Hartland | SR Rebuilt West Country Class | July 1978 | North Yorkshire Moors Railway | Under overhaul | Only surviving Eastleigh-built Light Pacific |
| 34105; Swanage | SR Unrebuilt West Country Class | March 1978 | Watercress Line | Under overhaul | |
| 35005; Canadian Pacific | SR Merchant Navy Class | March 1973 | Watercress Line | Operational | |
| 35006; Peninsular & Oriental S. N. Co. | SR Merchant Navy Class | March 1983 | Gloucestershire Warwickshire Railway | Awaiting overhaul | |
| 35009; Shaw Savill | SR Merchant Navy Class | | East Lancashire Railway | Unrestored | |
| 35010; Blue Star | SR Merchant Navy Class | January 1985 | Colne Valley Railway | Unrestored | |
| 35011; General Steam Navigation | SR Merchant Navy Class | | Swindon and Cricklade Railway | Under Restoration | The only locomotive in recorded history to carry the word "Steam" in its name. Currently being restored to as-built condition |
| 35018; British India Line | SR Merchant Navy Class | March 1980 | Carnforth MPD | Mainline operational | The first Merchant Navy to be rebuilt |
| 35022; Holland America Line | SR Merchant Navy Class | March 1986 | Crewe Diesel TMD | Unrestored | |
| 35025; Brocklebank Line | SR Merchant Navy Class | February 1986 | Private site | Under restoration | |
| 35027; Port Line | SR Merchant Navy Class | December 1982 | Crewe Diesel TMD | Under overhaul | |
| 35029; Ellerman Lines | SR Merchant Navy Class | January 1974 | National Railway Museum | Static display | Sectioned on one side to show the internal workings of a steam locomotive |
London, Midland, and Scottish Railway locomotives
| 43924 | MR 3835 Class 4F | September 1968 | Keighley and Worth Valley Railway | Static display | The first locomotive to leave Woodham's yard |
| 41312 | LMS Ivatt Class 2MT 2-6-2T | August 1974 | Watercress Line | Operational | |
| 41313 | LMS Ivatt Class 2MT 2-6-2T | July 1975 | Isle of Wight Steam Railway | Operational | |
| 42765 | LMS Hughes Crab 6P5F Class | April 1978 | East Lancashire Railway | Under overhaul | Running as 13065 |
| 42859 | LMS Hughes Crab 6P5F Class | December 1986 | Private site | Dismantled | Boiler scrapped, frames and wheels stored at separate sites. |
| 42968 | LMS Stanier 5MT 'Mogul' Class | December 1973 | Severn Valley Railway | Operational | Running as 13268 |
| 44123 | LMS Fowler Class 4F | December 1981 | Avon Valley Railway | Under restoration | |
| 44422 | LMS Fowler Class 4F | April 1977 | West Somerset Railway | Awaiting Overhaul | |
| 44901 | LMS Stanier 'Black 5' 5MT Class | | Vale of Berkeley Railway | Under restoration | One of the Barry Ten. Boiler sold to Ian Riley |
| 45163 | LMS Stanier 'Black 5' 5MT Class | January 1987 | Colne Valley Railway | Under restoration | |
| 45293 | LMS Stanier 'Black 5' 5MT Class | December 1986 | Colne Valley Railway | Under restoration | |
| 45337 | LMS Stanier 'Black 5' 5MT Class | May 1984 | Llangollen Railway | Under overhaul | |
| 45379 | LMS Stanier 'Black 5' 5MT Class | May 1974 | Locomotive Storage Ltd | Awaiting overhaul | On loan from the Watercress Line |
| 45491 | LMS Stanier 'Black 5' 5MT Class | July 1981 | Great Central Railway | Under restoration | |
| 45690; Leander | LMS 5XP Jubilee Class | May 1972 | Carnforth MPD | Awaiting overhaul | |
| 45699; Galatea | LMS 5XP Jubilee Class | April 1980 | Carnforth MPD | Operational | |
| 46428 | LMS Ivatt Class 2MT 2-6-0 | October 1979 | East Lancashire Railway | Under restoration | Currently painted as James the Red Engine |
| 46447 | LMS Ivatt Class 2MT 2–6–0 | June 1972 | East Somerset Railway | Under Overhaul | On loan from the Isle of Wight Steam Railway |
| 46512 | LMS Ivatt Class 2MT 2–6–0 | May 1973 | Strathspey Railway | Operational | Named E.V. Cooper, Engineer in preservation |
| 46521 | LMS Ivatt Class 2MT 2–6–0 | March 1971 | Great Central Railway | Under Overhaul | Carries the name Blossom |
| 47279 | LMS Fowler 3F 'Jinty' Class | August 1979 | Keighley and Worth Valley Railway | Static display | |
| 47298 | LMS Fowler 3F 'Jinty' Class | July 1974 | Riley and Son | operational | |
| 47324 | LMS Fowler 3F 'Jinty' Class | February 1978 | East Lancashire Railway | Under overhaul | Running as 16407 |
| 47327 | LMS Fowler 3F 'Jinty' Class | July 1970 | Midland Railway - Butterley | Static display | Running as SDJR 23 |
| 47357 | LMS Fowler 3F 'Jinty' Class | July 1970 | Midland Railway - Butterley | Operational | |
| 47406 | LMS Fowler 3F 'Jinty' Class | June 1983 | Great Central Railway | Awaiting overhaul | |
| 47493 | LMS Fowler 3F 'Jinty' Class | November 1972 | Spa Valley Railway | Under overhaul | |
| 48151 | LMS Stanier Class 8F | November 1975 | Carnforth MPD | Mainline operational | Named Gauge O' Guild in preservation |
| 48173 | LMS Stanier Class 8F | | Churnet Valley Railway | Under restoration | |
| 48305 | LMS Stanier Class 8F | November 1985 | Great Central Railway | Awaiting overhaul | |
| 48431 | LMS Stanier Class 8F | May 1972 | Keighley and Worth Valley Railway | Static display | |
| 48518 | LMS Stanier Class 8F | | N/A | Scrapped | Boiler to 1014, other parts to 45551. Originally the only surviving Doncaster-built 8F |
| 48624 | LMS Stanier Class 8F | July 1981 | Great Central Railway | Awaiting overhaul | |
| 53808 | S&DJR 7F Class | October 1970 | West Somerset Railway | Awaiting Overhaul | |
| 53809 | S&DJR 7F Class | December 1975 | North Norfolk Railway | Operational | |
London and North Eastern Railway locomotives
| 61264 | LNER Thompson Class B1 | July 1976 | North Yorkshire Moors Railway | Under Overhaul | The only ex-LNER locomotive in Woodham's yard |
British Railways locomotives
| 71000; Duke of Gloucester | BR Standard Class 8P | April 1974 | Tyseley Locomotive Works | Operational | |
| 73082; Camelot | BR Standard Class 5MT | October 1979 | Bluebell Railway | Operational | |
| 73096 | BR Standard Class 5MT | July 1985 | Watercress Line | Stored | |
| 73129 | BR Standard Class 5MT | January 1973 | Midland Railway - Butterley | Static display | Only surviving Standard 5 with Caprotti valve gear |
| 73156 | BR Standard Class 5MT | October 1986 | Great Central Railway | Operational | |
| 75014 | BR Standard Class 4MT 4-6-0 | February 1981 | Dartmouth Steam Railway | Operational | Named Braveheart in preservation |
| 75069 | BR Standard Class 4MT 4–6–0 | March 1973 | Severn Valley Railway | Operational | |
| 75078 | BR Standard Class 4MT 4–6–0 | June 1972 | Keighley and Worth Valley Railway | Operational | |
| 75079 | BR Standard Class 4MT 4–6–0 | March 1982 | Watercress Line | Under restoration | |
| 76017 | BR Standard Class 4MT 2-6-0 | January 1974 | Watercress Line | Operational | |
| 76077 | BR Standard Class 4MT 2–6–0 | May 1987 | Gloucestershire Warwickshire Railway | Under restoration | |
| 76079 | BR Standard Class 4MT 2–6–0 | July 1974 | Strathspey Railway | Awaiting overhaul | |
| 76084 | BR Standard Class 4MT 2–6–0 | January 1983 | North Norfolk Railway | Under Overhaul | |
| 78018 | BR Standard Class 2MT 2-6-0 | October 1978 | Great Central Railway | Operational | |
| 78019 | BR Standard Class 2MT 2–6–0 | March 1973 | Great Central Railway | Operational | |
| 78022 | BR Standard Class 2MT 2–6–0 | June 1975 | Keighley and Worth Valley Railway | Operational | |
| 78059 | BR Standard Class 2MT 2–6–0 | May 1983 | Bluebell Railway | Rebuilt | Currently being rebuilt into 2-6-2T 84030 |
| 80064 | BR Standard Class 4MT 2-6-4T | February 1973 | Bluebell Railway | Awaiting overhaul | |
| 80072 | BR Standard Class 4MT 2-6-4T | | Llangollen Railway | Under Overhaul | |
| 80078 | BR Standard Class 4MT 2-6-4T | September 1976 | Private site | Operational | |
| 80079 | BR Standard Class 4MT 2-6-4T | May 1971 | Severn Valley Railway | Static display | |
| 80080 | BR Standard Class 4MT 2-6-4T | November 1980 | East Lancashire Railway | Operational | On loan from the Midland Railway - Butterley |
| 80097 | BR Standard Class 4MT 2-6-4T | May 1985 | East Lancashire Railway | Operational | |
| 80098 | BR Standard Class 4MT 2-6-4T | November 1984 | Midland Railway - Butterley | Under overhaul | |
| 80100 | BR Standard Class 4MT 2-6-4T | October 1978 | Bluebell Railway | Unrestored | |
| 80104 | BR Standard Class 4MT 2-6-4T | September 1984 | Swanage Railway | Under Overhaul | |
| 80105 | BR Standard Class 4MT 2-6-4T | October 1973 | Strathspey Railway | Under overhaul | |
| 80135 | BR Standard Class 4MT 2-6-4T | April 1973 | North Yorkshire Moors Railway | Under overhaul | Painted in inauthentic BR lined green |
| 80136 | BR Standard Class 4MT 2-6-4T | August 1979 | North Yorkshire Moors Railway | Operational | |
| 80150 | BR Standard Class 4MT 2-6-4T | | Watercress Line | Unrestored | One of the 'Barry Ten' |
| 80151 | BR Standard Class 4MT 2-6-4T | March 1975 | Bluebell Railway | Operational | |
| 92134 | BR Standard Class 9F | December 1980 | North Yorkshire Moors Railway | Operational | Only surviving single-chimneyed 9F |
| 92207 | BR Standard Class 9F | October 1986 | Private site | Under restoration | Named Morning Star in preservation |
| 92212 | BR Standard Class 9F | September 1979 | Watercress Line | Under Overhaul | |
| 92214 | BR Standard Class 9F | December 1980 | Great Central Railway | Under Overhaul | Has carried the name Cock o' the North in preservation |
| 92219 | BR Standard Class 9F | May 1985 | Strathspey Railway | Unrestored | The penultimate steam locomotive built for British Railways |
| 92240 | BR Standard Class 9F | October 1978 | Bluebell Railway | Restored 1990 - Currently under overhaul | |
| 92245 | BR Standard Class 9F | | Barry Tourist Railway | Unrestored | One of the 'Barry Ten'. To be dismantled and sectioned for a Woodham's yard exhibition |

== See also ==
- Barry Ten
