= List of SR Merchant Navy class locomotives =

The SR Merchant Navy class is a type of steam locomotive, designed by Oliver Bulleid, that ran on the British Southern Railway network. All were built at the Southern Railway's Eastleigh Works. The following table sets out the names, numbers and other vital statistics of the locomotives that comprised the class. The 'Merchant Navies' represented a publicity success for the Southern Railway in highlighting the names of Merchant Navy shipping lines that used Southampton Docks, which were served by the Southern Railway. They also constituted a roving memorial to the seamen who fought at sea during the Second World War to keep Britain supplied with food, fuel and other goods.

The shipping lines below are linked to their current or last owners, and take into account the many mergers that occur in the Merchant Marine industry, for example, General Steam Navigation merged with P & O in 1920, and finally disappeared as a separate entity in 1972.

List of SR/BR Rebuilt and non-rebuilt Merchant Navy class locomotives
BR No.	SR No.	Name	Built	Rebuilt	Withdrawn	Preserved/location	Preservation Status	Image	Notes
35001	21C1	Channel Packet	February 1941	August 1959	November 1964				Entered SR service June 1941. Scrapped at Birds (Swansea) Ltd. 1965
35002	21C2	Union Castle	June 1941	May 1958	February 1964				Scrapped at Slag Reduction Co. Ltd., Yorkshire 1964
35003	21C3	Royal Mail	September 1941	August 1959	July 1967				Holder of class speed record (105.88 mph). Last authenticated 100 mph plus on British Railways by a steam locomotive. Scrapped at J Cashmore, Newport 1967
35004	21C4	Cunard White Star	October 1941	July 1958	October 1965				Scrapped at Cohen's/Eastleigh Shed 1966
35005	21C5	Canadian Pacific	December 1941	May 1959	October 1965	The Watercress Line	Restored on the Great Central Railway at Loughborough and used on main line steam specials. Painted in British Railways Blue livery between 2000 and 2001. Now based at The Watercress line. In 2025 completed overhaul at Eastleigh Locomotive Works.		
35006	21C6	Peninsular & Oriental S. N. Co.	December 1941	October 1959	August 1964	Gloucestershire and Warwickshire Railway	Awaiting overhaul after boiler ticket expiry.		
35007	21C7	Aberdeen Commonwealth	June 1942	May 1958	July 1967				Scrapped at J. Buttigieg, Newport 1968
35008	21C8	Orient Line	June 1942	May 1957	July 1967				Scrapped at J. Buttigieg, Newport 1968
35009	21C9	Shaw Savill	June 1942	March 1957	July 1964	Private Site, Bury	Stored awaiting restoration.		
35010	21C10	Blue Star	July 1942	January 1957	September 1966	Colne Valley Railway	Stored		
35011	21C11	General Steam Navigation	December 1944	July 1959	February 1966	Private site, Dorset	Under long-term restoration to as-built condition.		
35012	21C12	United States Lines	January 1945	February 1957	April 1967				Scrapped at J Cashmore, Newport 1967
35013	21C13	Blue Funnel	February 1945	May 1956	July 1967				Originally named Blue Funnel Line, renamed Blue Funnel Certum Pete Finem on 21 June 1945. Scrapped at J. Buttigieg, Newport 1968
35014	21C14	Nederland Line	February 1945	July 1956	March 1967				Scrapped at J Cashmore, Newport 1967
35015	21C15	Rotterdam Lloyd	March 1945	June 1958	February 1964				Scrapped at Slag Reduction Co. Ltd., Yorkshire 1964
35016	21C16	Elders Fyffes	March 1945	April 1957	August 1965				Scrapped at Birds (Swansea) Ltd. 1965
35017	21C17	Belgian Marine	April 1945	March 1957	July 1966				Scrapped at J. Buttigieg, Newport 1966
35018	21C18	British India Line	May 1945	February 1956	August 1964	WCRC Carnforth	Operational, main-line certified		Originally built with fabricated wheels that were replaced with conventional cast wheels in 1947 First of the 'Merchant Navies' to be rebuilt.
35019	21C19	French Line CGT	June 1945	May 1959	September 1965				The only member of the class to have script lettering on the nameplate, as used by French Line. Scrapped at J Cashmore, Newport 1966
35020	21C20	Bibby Line	June 1945	April 1956	February 1965				Scrapped at BR/Eastleigh Works 1965
35021	-	New Zealand Line	September 1948	June 1959	August 1965				Scrapped at Birds (Swansea) Ltd. 1965
35022	-	Holland America Line	October 1948	June 1956	May 1966	Private Site, Bury	Boiler overhauled for eventual use by 35027, awaiting restoration to mainline standards		
35023	-	Holland-Afrika Line	November 1948	February 1957	July 1967				Scrapped at J. Buttigieg, Newport 1968
35024	-	East Asiatic Company	November 1948	April 1959	January 1965				Scrapped at C. Woodfield and Sons, Newport 1965
35025	-	Brocklebank Line	November 1948	December 1956	September 1964	Private site at Sellindge, Kent	Stored, pending long-term restoration		
35026	-	Lamport & Holt Line	December 1948	January 1957	March 1967				Scrapped at J Cashmore, Newport 1967
35027	-	Port Line	December 1948	May 1957	September 1966	Private Site, Bury	Under overhaul. (see 35027 Port Line) Being restored to mainline standards, based at Southall		
35028	-	Clan Line	December 1948	October 1959	July 1967	Stewarts Lane, London	Operational, main-line certified		
35029	-	Ellerman Lines	February 1949	September 1959	September 1966	National Railway Museum	Sectioned Exhibit		
35030	-	Elder Dempster Lines	April 1949	April 1958	July 1967				Scrapped at J. Buttigieg, Newport 1968

== See also ==
- SR Merchant Navy Class 35006 Peninsular & Oriental S. N. Co.
- SR Merchant Navy Class 35009 Shaw Savill
- SR Merchant Navy Class 35027 Port Line
- SR Merchant Navy Class 35028 Clan Line
