= Port Line (disambiguation) =

Port Line may refer to:

- Port Line - a British Merchant Navy company
- SR Merchant Navy Class 35027 Port Line - a preserved British steam locomotive
- The nickname of the rail route from Dumfries to Stranraer which comprised the Castle Douglas and Dumfries Railway and Portpatrick and Wigtownshire Joint Railway.
- Oslo Port Line, a railway line in Norway
- Port line (Mumbai Suburban Railway), a suburban railway line in Mumbai, India
