= SR Merchant Navy Class 35006 Peninsular & Oriental S. N. Co. =

Preserved British locomotive

35006 Peninsular & Oriental S. N. Co.
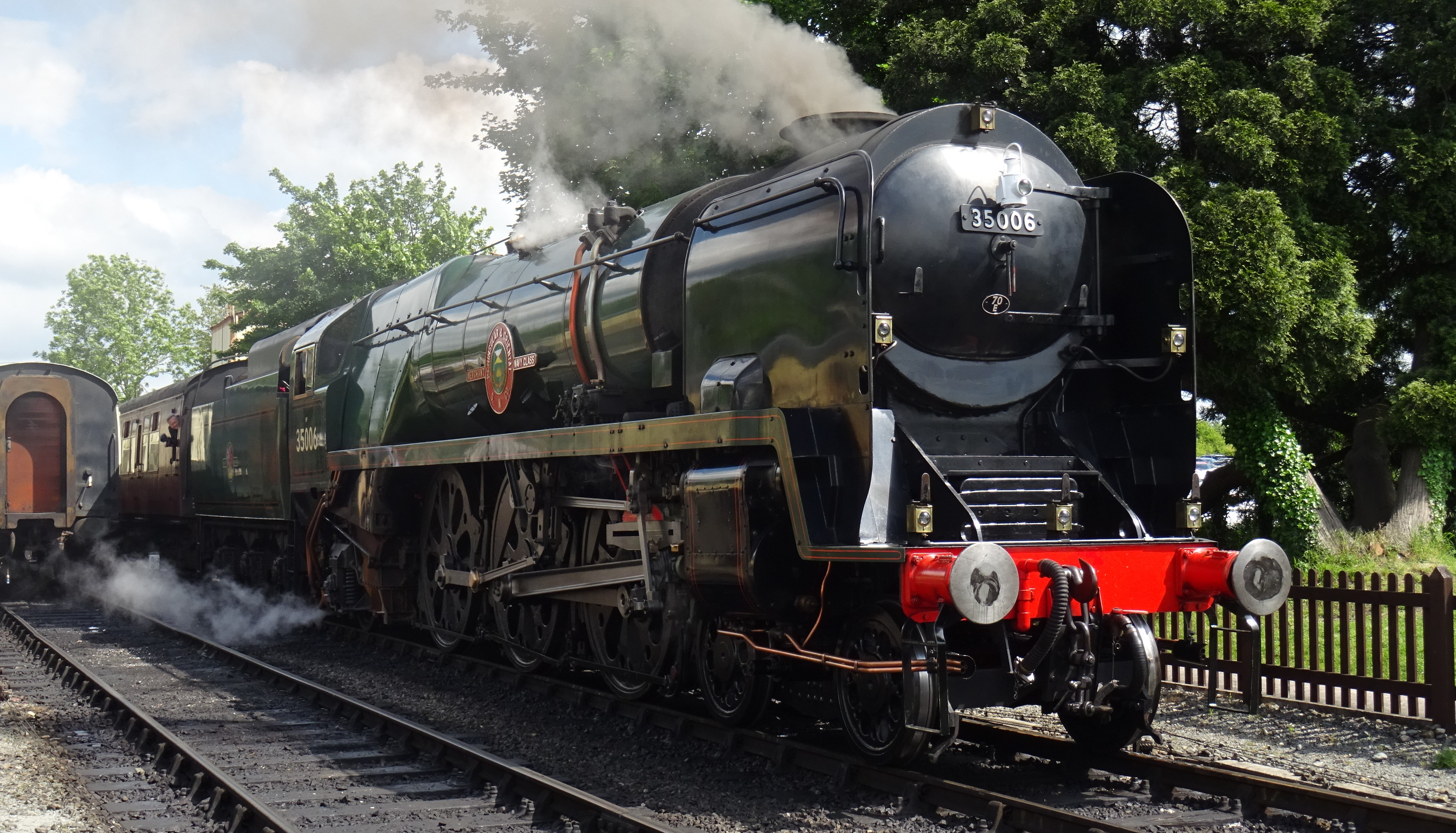
- 35006 Peninsular & Oriental S. N. Co. at Toddington during the 2024 Cotswold Festival of Steam on the GWSR, May 2024.
Type and origin
- Power type: Steam
- Builder: Eastleigh Works
- Build date: December 1941
- Rebuild date: October 1959
Specifications
- Configuration
  - Whyte: 4-6-2
- Gauge: 4 ft 8 1/2 in (1,435 mm)
- Driver dia.: 6 ft 2 in (1.88 m)
- Wheelbase: 61 ft 6 in (18.75 m)
- Length: 71 ft 7¾ in (21.84 m)
- Total weight: 94 tons 15 cwt (96,270 kg, c. 212,240 lb)
- Boiler pressure: 280 psi (19.31 bar; 1.93 MPa), later reduced to 250 psi (17.24 bar; 1.72 MPa)
- Cylinders: 3
- Cylinder size: 18 in bore x 24 in stoke (457 x 610 mm)
- Loco brake: Vacuum (Air brakes fitted)
- Safety systems: AWS, TPWS, OTMR, GSM-R
Performance figures
- Tractive effort: 33,495 lbf (149.0 kN) (previously 37,515 lbf (166.9 kN))
Career
- Operators: British Railways
- Class: Merchant Navy
- Power class: SR: A; BR: 8P
- Numbers: SR 21C06; BR 35006
- Official name: Peninsular & Oriental Steam Navigation Co.
- Withdrawn: August 1964
- Current owner: 35006 Locomotive Company Ltd

35006 Peninsular & Oriental S. N. Co. is a Southern Railway rebuilt Merchant Navy Class 4-6-2 steam locomotive. It was built at Eastleigh locomotive works in December 1941 and given the Southern Railway number 21C6. Although the first two members of the Merchant Navy class had their air-smoothed casings made of sheet steel, 21C6 was one of eight in which the casing was made of asbestos board, with a visible horizontal fixing strip along the centre line.

21C6 was allocated to Salisbury Shed where it remained based throughout its working life. Its first livery was unlined black, with hand-painted lettering in gilt with black blocking and yellow highlights. In December 1942, the locomotive's Bulleid chain-driven valve gear failed near Honiton on an evening goods service when one of the valve chains parted, throwing oil over the boiler cladding, track and lineside vegetation, which then ignited.

After Nationalisation in 1948, the locomotive was renumbered as 35006. From November 1955, all members of the Merchant Navy class were substantially rebuilt, with 35006 and 35028 Clan Line being the last two examples to be modified in October 1959. Rebuilding included the removal of the air-smoothed casing, and the fitting of Walschaerts valve gear.

35006 was withdrawn in August 1964, with a final mileage of 1,134,319. It was bought by Dai Woodham for £350 and sent to Woodham Brothers scrapyard in Barry, South Wales. Whilst at the scrapyard, the tender, which was notable for being used only with 35006 for its entire working life, was sold to a group restoring another Merchant Navy locomotive, and many fittings were removed from the engine. The remains of 35006 were purchased for preservation in 1983 with the intention of restoring it to running order. The locomotive was moved to Toddington, the principal station of the Gloucestershire Warwickshire Railway. It was the 144th locomotive to leave that scrapyard.

Restoration was a long drawn out affair. On 10 August 2015, 35006 moved under its own power for the first time in over 50 years, albeit with only two of the three cylinders connected. During April and May 2016, the locomotive undertook light engine and loaded test runs. The first public runs were during the GWSR's Cotswold Festival of Steam gala at the end of May, and the locomotive is now operational.
