= SR Merchant Navy class =

Class of 30 three-cylinder 4-6-2 locomotives

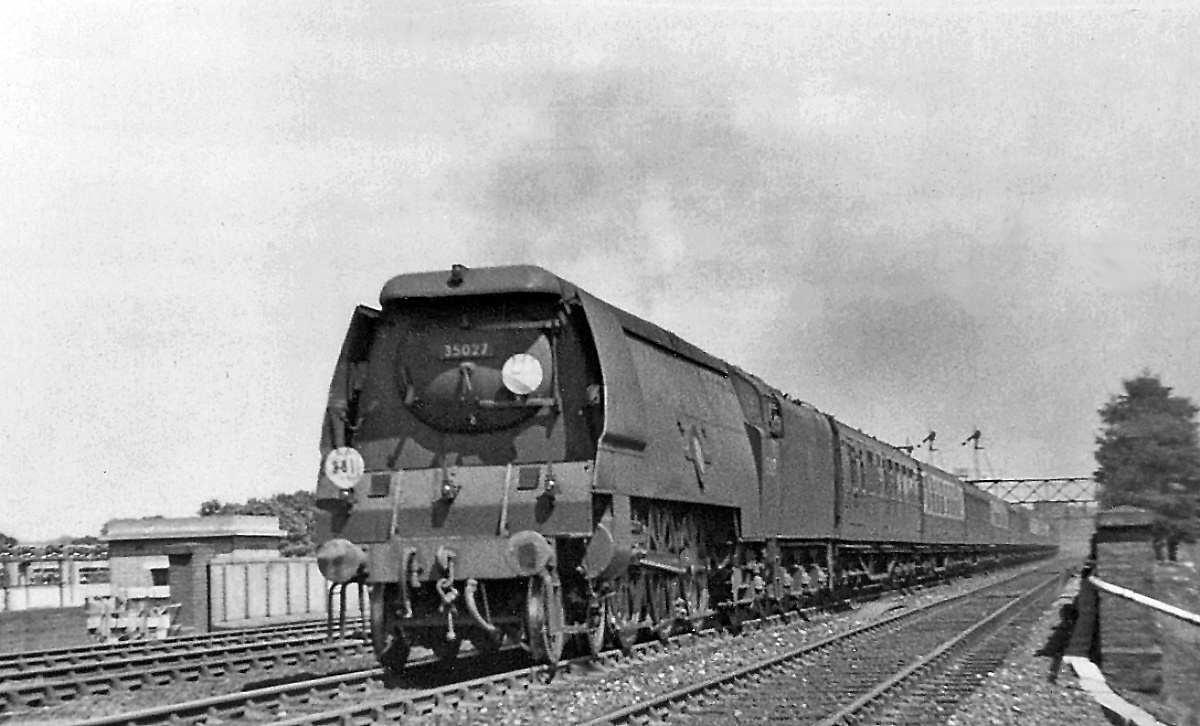
- Unrebuilt 35027 Port Line in July 1955
Type and origin
- Power type: Steam
- Designer: Oliver Bulleid
- Builder: SR Eastleigh Works
- Build date: 1941–1949
- Total produced: 30
Specifications
- Configuration
  - Whyte: 4-6-2
- Gauge: 4 ft 8 1/2 in (1,435 mm) standard gauge
- Leading dia.: 3 ft 1 in (0.940 m)
- Driver dia.: 6 ft 2 in (1.880 m)
- Trailing dia.: 3 ft 7 in (1.092 m)
- Length: 69 ft 8 in (21.23 m)
- Loco weight: 94.75 long tons (96.3 t; 106.1 short tons)
- Fuel type: Coal
- Fuel capacity: 5.00 long tons (5.1 t; 5.6 short tons)
- Water cap.: 5,000 imp gal (22,730 L; 6,000 US gal)
- Firebox
  - Grate area: 48.5 sq ft (4.51 m^{2})
- Boiler pressure: 280 psi (19.31 bar; 1.93 MPa), later reduced to 250 psi (17.24 bar; 1.72 MPa)
- Cylinders: Three
- Cylinder size: 18 in × 24 in (457 mm × 610 mm)
Performance figures
- Tractive effort: 37,515 lbf (166.9 kN), later reduced to 33,495 lbf (149.0 kN)
Career
- Operators: Southern Railway; → British Railways
- Class: SR / BR: Merchant Navy
- Power class: SR: A; BR: 8P
- Locale: South West Main Line
- Disposition: All modified (see below); 1 being reverted to original design

The SR Merchant Navy class (originally known as the 21C1 class, and later informally known as Bulleid Pacifics, Spam Cans – which name was also applied to the Light Pacifics – or Packets) is a class of air-smoothed 4-6-2 (Pacific) steam locomotives designed for the Southern Railway by Oliver Bulleid. The Pacific design was chosen in preference to several others proposed by Bulleid. The first members of the class were constructed during the Second World War, and the last of the 30 locomotives in 1949.

Incorporating a number of new developments in British steam locomotive technology, the design of the Merchant Navy class was among the first to use welding in the construction process; this enabled easier fabrication of components during the austerity of the war and post-war economies. In addition, the locomotives featured thermic syphons in their boilers and the controversial Bulleid chain-driven valve gear. The engines were named after the Merchant Navy shipping lines involved in the Battle of the Atlantic, and latterly those which used Southampton Docks: a publicity move by the Southern Railway, which operated the docks at the time.

Due to problems with some of the more novel features of Bulleid's design, all members of the class were modified by British Railways during the late 1950s, losing their air-smoothed casings in the process. The Merchant Navy class operated until the end of Southern steam in July, 1967. A third of the class has survived and can be seen on heritage railways throughout Great Britain. They were known for reaching speeds of up to 105 mph (167 km/h); such speeds were recorded by examples including No. 35003 Royal Mail (since scrapped) and Nos. 35005 Canadian Pacific and 35028 Clan Line (both preserved).

== Background ==
The Southern Railway was the most financially successful of the "Big Four", but this was largely based on investment in suburban and main line electrification. After the successful introduction of the SR Schools class in 1930, the railway had lagged behind the others in terms of modernising its ageing fleet of steam locomotives. Following the retirement of the general manager of the Southern Railway Sir Herbert Walker and Richard Maunsell the Chief Mechanical Engineer (CME) in 1937, their successors considered that the time had come to change this situation. In March 1938, the new general manager Gilbert Szlumper authorised Oliver Bulleid, Maunsell's replacement, to prepare designs for 20 express passenger locomotives. The deteriorating international situation prior to the Second World War was an additional factor in this decision.

Bulleid's first suggestion was for an eight-coupled locomotive with a 4-8-2 wheel arrangement for the heavily loaded Golden Arrow and Night Ferry Continental express trains, although this was quickly modified to a 2-8-2, a wheel arrangement associated with Nigel Gresley's P2 locomotives; Bulleid himself had worked with Gresley in the past. A second "Mikado" locomotive design was planned to have a Helmholtz pony truck – a system already successfully applied on the Continent. However, both proposals for eight-coupled locomotives were resisted by the Southern Railway's Chief Civil Engineer, so a new 4-6-2 Pacific design was settled upon instead. The new design was intended for express passenger and semi-fast work in Southern England, though it had to be equally adept at freight workings due to the nominal "mixed traffic" classification Bulleid applied to the class for them to be built during wartime. Administrative measures had been put into place by the wartime government, preventing the construction of express passenger locomotives, due to shortages of materials and a need for locomotives with freight-hauling capabilities. Classifying a design as "mixed traffic" neatly circumvented this restriction.

== Design ==
Most of the detailed design for the Merchant Navy class was undertaken by the drawing office at Brighton works, but some work was also undertaken by Ashford and Eastleigh. This division of responsibility was possibly due to Bulleid's wish to restrict knowledge of the new class to a limited number of personnel. The design incorporated a number of novel features, compared to then-current steam locomotive practice in Great Britain.

=== Cylinders, valve gear, wheels and brakes ===
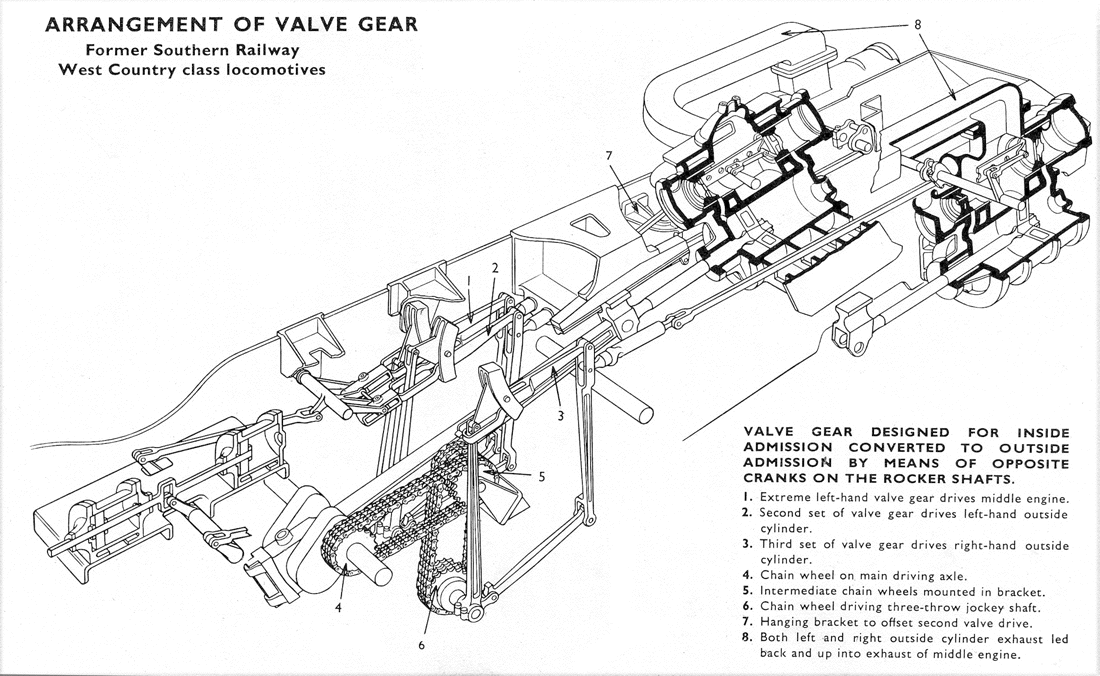
Bulleid chain valve gear

Three 18 inches (46 cm) diameter cylinders drove the centre coupled axle. The inside cylinder was steeply inclined at 1:7.5, but the outside cylinders were all horizontal.

It was originally intended to use a gear-driven valve gear, but space restrictions within the frames and wartime material shortages led Bulleid to design his novel chain-driven valve gear. This component was unique amongst British locomotive design practices. It later gained a bad reputation, because it could cause highly irregular valve events, a problem compounded by the fast-moving Bulleid steam reverser. The entire system was located in a sealed oil bath, another unique design, providing constant lubrication to the moving parts.

The locomotives were equipped with the unusual 6 ft 2 in (1.88 m) Bulleid Firth Brown (BFB) driving wheels which both lighter and stronger than the spoked equivalent. These proved to be successful and were later used on other Bulleid classes. The leading bogie was based upon that of the SR Lord Nelson class, although it had a 6 ft 3 in (1.90 m) wheelbase as opposed to Maunsell's 7 ft 6 in (2.28 m) design, and featured 3 ft 1 in (0.94 m) BFB wheels. A long coupled driving wheelbase was incorporated into the design, to keep the locomotives within the lineal loading of the Southern Railway's narrower bridges. The supporting rear trailing truck was a one-piece steel casting that gave the smoothest of rides; the design was utilised in the future BR Standard Class 7.

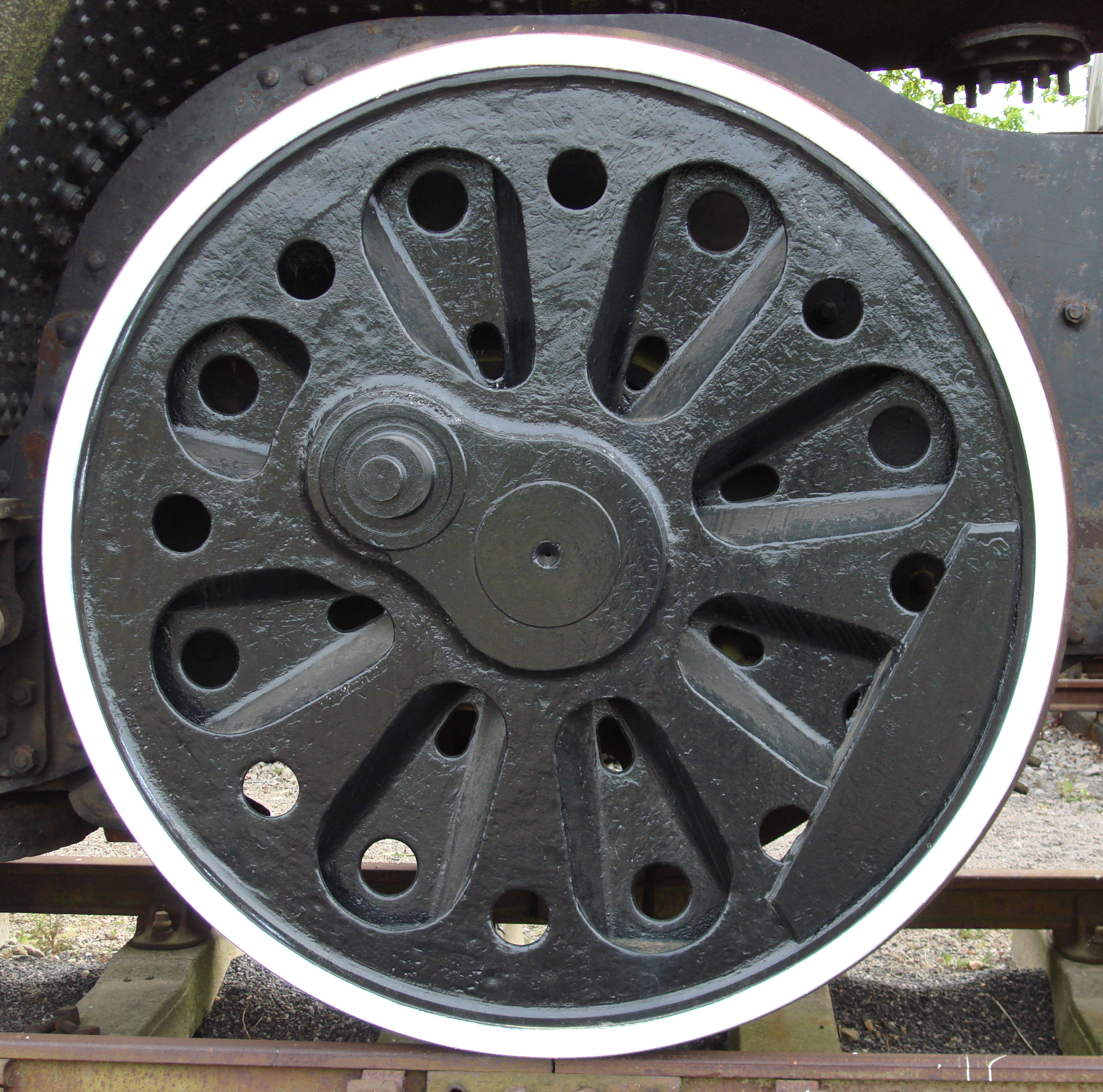
A driving wheel of the distinctive Bulleid Firth Brown design, seen here on No. 35010 Blue Star. Note the balance weight on the lower right, a feature not present on the Merchant Navy locomotives as-built.

The spaces between driving wheels housed steam-powered clasp brakes, that gripped the wheels by way of a "scissor" action. The two middle brake hangers held two brake blocks each, whilst the two outside hanger on the leading and rear driving wheels held one block each. These were connected together by outside rodding for ease of access, and the whole system was operated from the footplate.

=== Boiler and welded firebox ===
The maximum boiler pressure was higher than any other British regular service locomotive (except the GWR County class) at 280 psi.

Bulleid decided on cheaper all-welded fireboxes for the boilers as opposed to more common riveted construction, and a steel inner firebox which was 1.5 long tons (1.5 t) lighter than a more usual copper example. Two welded steel thermic syphons were implemented to improve water circulation around the firebox and these were subcontracted to Beyer Peacock.

However he soon discovered that the Southern Railway lacked the facilities to manufacture welded boilers of this size, so the first ten boilers were ordered on outside contract from the North British Locomotive Company.

=== Air-smoothed casing, smokebox and blastpipe ===
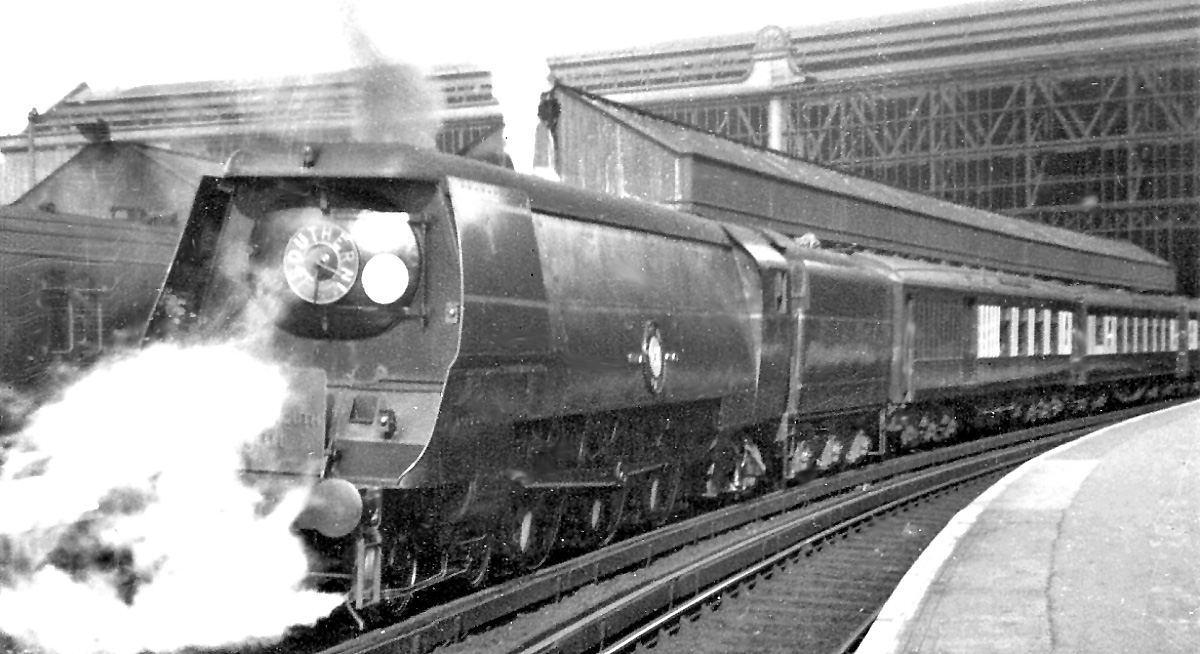
21C18 British India Line hauling the Bournemouth Belle in 1946

The boiler was enveloped by Bulleid's air-smoothed sheet-steel casing, which was not for the purposes of streamlining, as demonstrated by the extremely flat front end, but as a way of lifting exhaust gases. The flat sides were also an aid to cleaning the locomotive with mechanical carriage washers, representing an attempt to reduce labour costs. It followed the profile of the Belpaire firebox and extended to a curved profile forward of the smokebox front. Spun glass mattresses were used for boiler lagging. The smokebox was a sheet metal fabrication to the same profile as the firebox, acting as a former to maintain the shape of the air-smoothed casing. In between, the casing was supported by channel-section steel crinolines (strengtheners used to maintain the shape) attached to the frames. The smokebox housed the five-nozzle Lemaître blastpipe arranged in a circle within a large-diameter chimney.

=== Tender ===
Bulleid designed a new 5,000 imperial gallons (22,730 L; 6,000 US gal) tender which could carry 5 tons (5.1 t) of coal on a six-wheel chassis. It featured BFB wheels and streamlined panels, or "raves", that gave the top of the tender a similar cross-sectional outline to the carriages hauled by the locomotive. The water tank was of welded sheet construction to save weight, and the tender was fitted with vacuum braking equipment of a clasp-type similar to that used on the locomotive. Three train-brake vacuum reservoirs of cylindrical construction were grouped on the tank top, behind the coal space. Unusually for a British locomotive, two extra water filler caps were incorporated into the tender front, for access from the footplate. The original tender design proved to be inadequately braced and subject to serious leakage if even slightly damaged, or when water surges caused the welded joints to split. The problem was not solved until 1944 when additional baffling was fitted.

=== Other innovations ===
Electric lighting was also provided on both the locomotive and the footplate, supplied by a steam-powered generator fitted below the footplate. The gauges had fluorescent dial markings lit by ultra-violet light. This enabled clearer night-time vision of the boiler steam pressure gauge and the brake pipe vacuum gauge, whilst eliminating dazzle, making it easier for the crew to see signals along the track. Close attention was also paid to the ergonomics of the driving cab, which was designed with the controls required for operation grouped according to the needs of both fireman and driver, thus promoting safe operation. As an aid to the fireman, a steam-operated treadle was provided that used steam pressure to open the firehole doors (where the coal is shovelled into the firebox). The footplate was entirely enclosed, improving crew working conditions in winter.

== Construction ==
The Southern Railway placed an order for ten of the new locomotives to be built at Eastleigh Works, although the boilers had to be supplied from private industry and the tenders were built at Ashford. The prototype was completed in February 1941, numbered 21C1, and named Channel Packet at a ceremony at Eastleigh works on 10 March 1941. It underwent extensive trials and minor modifications before joining Southern Railway stock 4 June 1941. A second prototype, 21C2 Union Castle was completed in June and named at Victoria railway station 4 July. Both prototypes were found to be seven tons over the specified weight, and, at the insistence of the Southern Railway Civil Engineer, production of the remainder was halted until steps were taken to remedy this. This was achieved by using thinner steel plates for the frame stretchers and covering the boiler cladding, and enlarging the existing lightening holes in the main frames. The remaining eight locomotives in the batch were delivered between September 1941 and July 1942.

A second batch of ten followed, beginning in December 1944 and culminating in June 1945. These were entirely constructed at Eastleigh and equipped with 5,100-imperial-gallon (23,190 L; 6,120 US gal) tenders. The Merchant Navy class spawned the design and construction of a lighter version of the same locomotive with consequently increased route availability. These were the West Country and Battle of Britain class Light Pacifics, the first of which entered service in 1945.

Just prior to the nationalisation of the railways in 1948, the Southern Railway placed an order for ten more Merchant Navy locomotives, with larger 6,000-imperial-gallon (27,280 L; 7,210 US gal) tenders. A shortage of materials meant that delivery was delayed until September 1948, and completed in 1949; the batch never carried Southern Railway numbers. Eastleigh was responsible for the construction of the final batch, which were in the series 35021–35030. Construction was undertaken in-house by Eastleigh works, with the boilers and tenders constructed at Brighton, the frames at Ashford and the rest at Eastleigh. These were equipped with wedge-shaped cab fronts from the outset, and greater use of welding ensured lighter locomotives. The batch was also fitted with the TIA ("Traitement Integral Armand") chemical feed-water equipment used on the Light Pacifics. This precipitated scale-forming constituents in the "hard-water" of southern England into a non-adhesive mud that could be cleared from the locomotive using a manual "blow-down" valve. A delay in the construction of the new larger tenders for the new locomotives meant that some were fitted with the smaller examples intended for use with Light Pacifics that were under construction at the time. Two spare boilers for the class were also constructed at Brighton and Eastleigh during 1950/1.

== Numbering and naming the locomotives ==
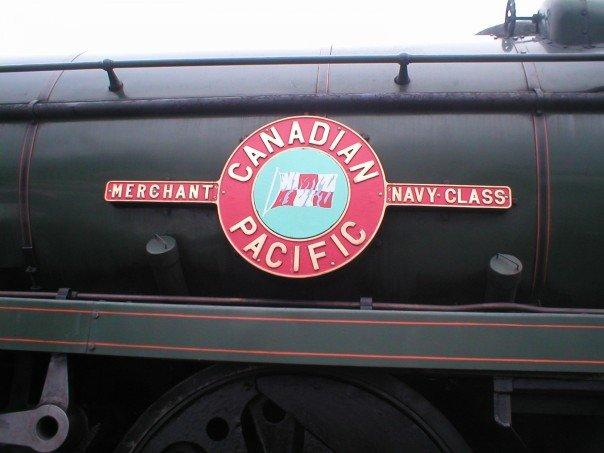
Nameplate configuration of the Merchant Navy class (here 35005 Canadian Pacific)

Bulleid adopted a new numbering scheme for all his locomotives based on Continental practice, following his experiences at the French branch of Westinghouse Electric before the First World War, and those of his tenure in the rail operating department during that conflict. The Southern Railway numbers followed an adaptation of the UIC classification system of using letters and numbers to designate the powered and unpowered axles, together with a running number. Thus the first 4-6-2 locomotive became 21C1 – where "2" and "1" refer to the number of unpowered leading and trailing axles respectively, and "C" refers to the number of driving axles, in this case three. The remainder were numbered 21C2-21C20. The scheme was abandoned by British Railways in 1949 and the existing locomotives were renumbered under the British Railways standard system in the series 35001-35020; the final batch appeared in traffic as 35021-35030.

The Southern Railway considered naming the locomotives after victories of the Second World War, to the extent that a mocked-up nameplate River Plate was produced. In the event, when early successes for the British proved few and far between, the chairman of the Union-Castle Line suggested naming them after shipping companies which had called at Southampton Docks in peacetime. This idea resonated in 1941 because the shipping lines were heavily involved in the Atlantic convoys to and from Britain during the Second World War.

A new design of nameplate was created, featuring a circular plate with a smaller circle in the centre. The inner circle carried the colours of the shipping company on a stylised flag, on an air force blue background. Around the outer circle was the name of the locomotive, picked out in gilt lettering. A horizontal rectangular plate was attached to either side of the circular nameplate, with "Merchant Navy Class" in gilt lettering. This acted as a class plate, as indicated on the nameplate photograph, above left.

During their operational career, the class gained several nicknames; the most obvious, Bulleid Pacific, simply denoted the designer and wheel arrangement. The colloquial name Spam Can arose from their utilitarian appearance, enhanced by the flat, boxy air-smoothed casing, and the resemblance of this to the distinctive tin cans in which SPAM was sold. The nickname Packets was also adopted by locomotive drivers, as the first member of the class was named Channel Packet.

== Operational details ==
As the class appeared during the War, there were no heavily laden Continental Boat Trains from Dover and Folkestone, for which they had been designed. They were, however, used on express trains on the South West Main Line to Southampton and to Exeter . In August 1945, a series of test runs were made between London Victoria and Dover and from October the class were used on the resumed Continental expresses. The prestigious Bournemouth Belle Pullman train was reinstated in October 1946 and entrusted to the class for the next two decades. However, their heavy axle loading and length meant that they were banned from many areas of the Southern Railway, and, later, the British Railways Southern Region network.

== Subsequent development ==
As mentioned, the main production batch of Southern-built locomotives differed from the two prototypes, Channel Packet and Union Castle. The steam-operated firehole door treadle was removed, and a new type of boiler cladding was utilised in response to the worsening supply situation during the Second World War. Modification was also made to the air-smoothed casing surrounding the smokebox after reports were made of drifting smoke obscuring the locomotive crew's vision ahead. Initially, the only form of smoke deflection was a narrow slot in front of the chimney, intended to enable air to lift the smoke when the locomotive was travelling. This proved inadequate because of the relatively soft exhaust blast that came from the multiple-jet blastpipe, which failed to be caught by the air flow. After several trials, the air flow was increased by extending the casing roof over the front of the smokebox to form a cowling whilst side smoke deflector plates were also incorporated into the front of the air-smoothed casing. The latter added to the poor visibility from the footplate and the expedients combined never fully solved the smoke drift problem.

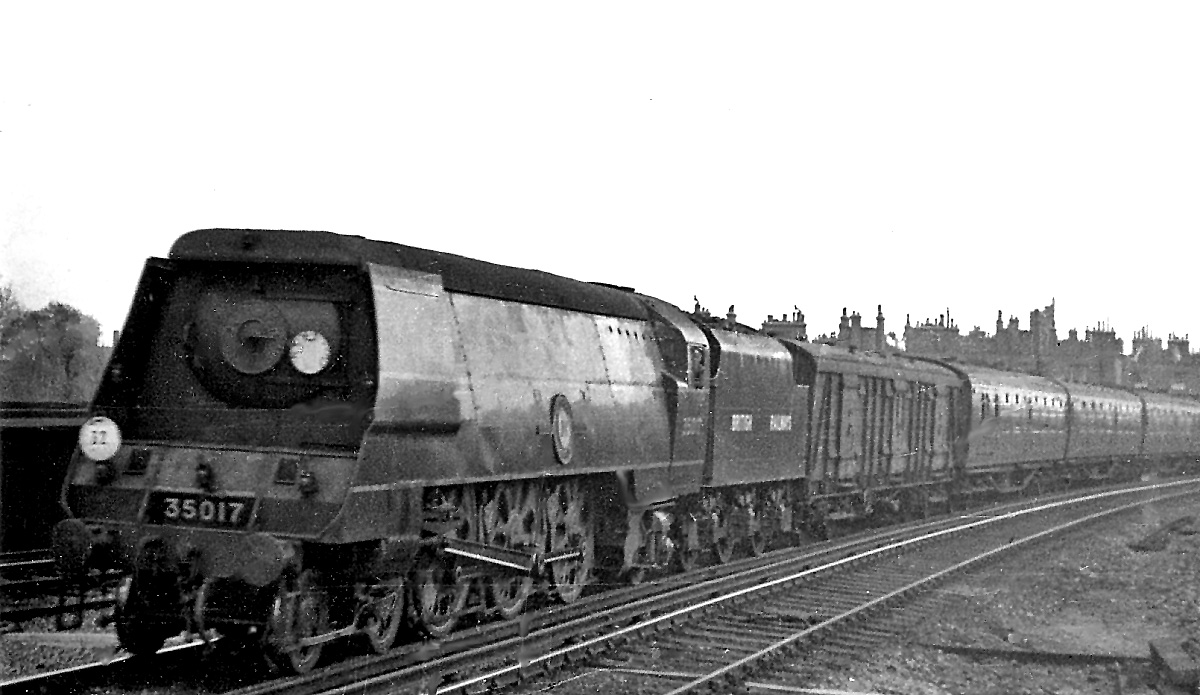
35017 Belgian Marine during the 1948 Locomotive Exchange Trials

During the time they operated under the Southern Railway, further modifications were applied to the class, such as the reduction in boiler pressure to 250 psi (1.72 MPa) and the redesign of the footplate spectacle plates. These are the small windows on the front face of the cab, which were redesigned to a wedge-shaped profile, a feature to be seen on all Bulleid-designed locomotives post-nationalisation. They had been introduced in Britain in 1934 with the Gresley-designed Cock o' the North. Originally, the spectacle plates of the Bulleid Pacifics were at the conventional right-angle to the direction of the locomotive, and offered limited vision ahead along the air-smoothed casing. The Southern-built batches also had variations in the material used for the air-smoothed casing with a change from sheet steel to an asbestos compound, forced upon the manufacturer by wartime expediency. This resulted in several class members having a horizontal strengthening rib running down the length of the casing. The final Southern Railway-initiated experiment involved equipping 21C5 Canadian Pacific with a Berkeley mechanical stoker imported from Canada. Little improvement in performance was seen when trialled under British Railways auspices in 1948 and the locomotive was re-converted to hand-firing.

As mentioned, the British Railways batch had detail differences to previous versions. The most significant modification was the reduction of weight using lighter materials unavailable during wartime. From 1952 the air-smoothed casing ahead of the cylinders was removed to ease maintenance and lubrication. This coincided with the removal of the tender 'raves' on all locomotives, as they quickly rotted, obstructed the packing of coal into the bunker and restricted the driver's view when reversing the locomotive. The resultant 'cut-down' tender included new, enclosed storage for fire-irons, revised step ladders and glass spectacle plates to protect the crew from flying coal dust when running tender-first.

== Performance of the unmodified locomotives ==
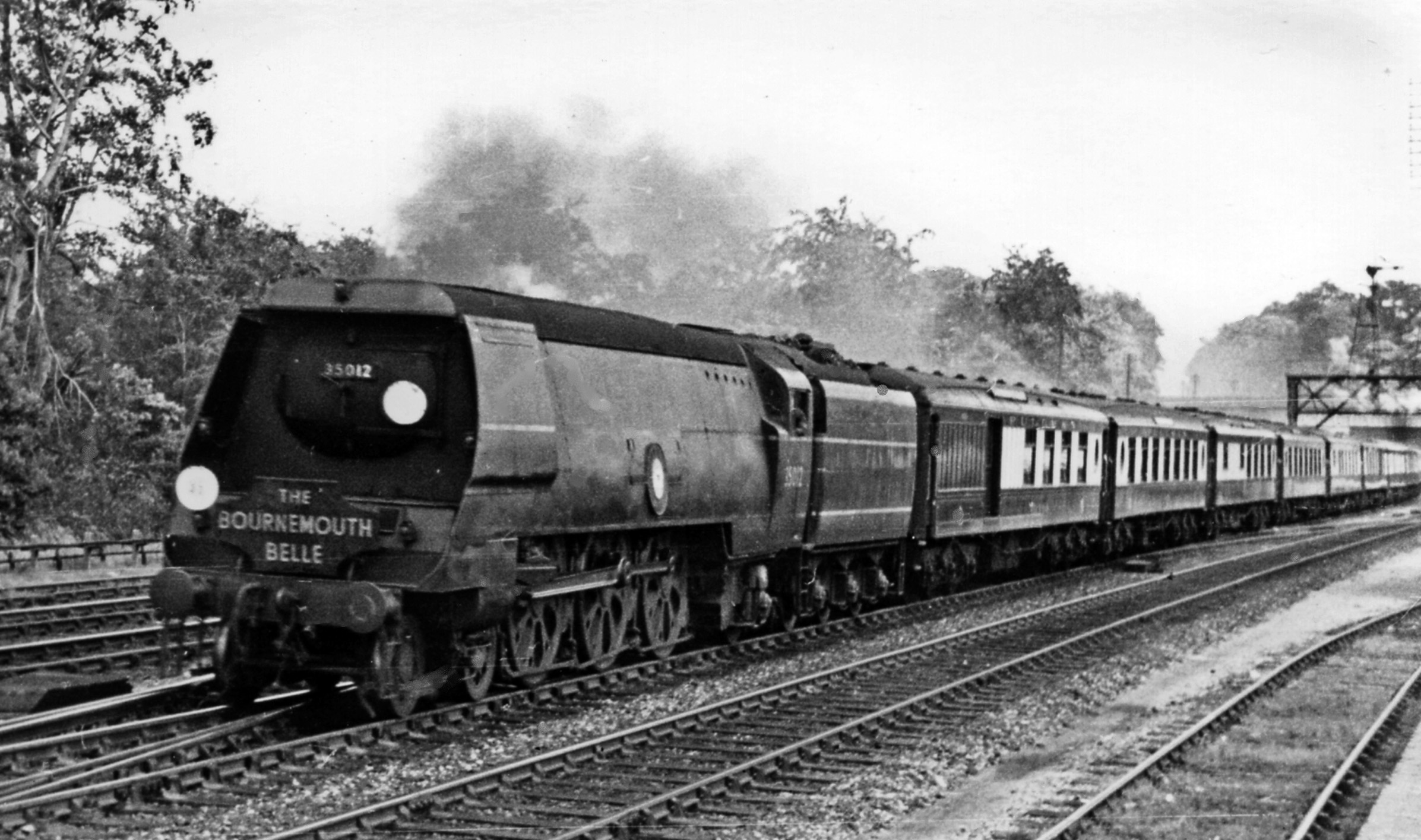
35012 United States Lines hauling the Bournemouth Belle in 1950

The new locomotives demonstrated that they could generate enormous power using mediocre quality fuel, due largely to Bulleid's excellent boiler. They also ran very smoothly at high speed. However, the first few years of service by the Merchant Navy class were beset by a variety of technical problems, partly as a result of having so many novel features. Some of these were merely teething troubles, but others remained with the class throughout their working lives. These may be summarised as follows:

- Adhesion problems. The locomotives were often prone to wheelslip, and required very careful driving when starting a heavy train from rest, but once into their stride they were noted for their free running, excellent steam production and being remarkably stable when hauling heavy expresses.
- Maintenance problems. The chain driven valve gear proved to be expensive to maintain and subject to rapid wear. Leaks from the oil bath onto the wheels caused oil to splash onto the boiler lagging in service. Once saturated with oil, the lagging attracted coal dust and ash which provided a combustible material, and as a result of the heavy braking of the locomotives, sparks would set the lagging on fire underneath the air-smoothed casing. The fires were also attributed to oil overflowing from axlebox lubricators onto the wheels when stationary to be flung upwards into the boiler lagging in service. In either case, the local fire brigade would invariably be called to put the fire out, with cold water coming into contact with the hot boiler, causing stress to the casing. Many photographs show an unmodified locomotive with a 'buckled' (warped) casing, the result of a lagging fire.
- High fuel consumption. This became very apparent in the 1948 Locomotive Exchange Trials and at trials at the Rugby locomotive testing plant in 1952. This was largely attributed to the variability of valve events due to the chain-driven valve gear.
- Restricted driver visibility due to the air-smoothed casing. The exhaust problem was never adequately resolved, and continued to beat down onto the air-smoothed casing when the engine was on the move, obscuring the driver's vision from the cab.

As a result of these problems, in 1954 serious consideration was given to scrapping the class and replacing them with Britannia class locomotives. However, the locomotives had excellent boilers and several other good features and so the decision was taken to rebuild them, removing several of Bulleid's less successful ideas.

== Modification ==
BR Modified Merchant Navy class
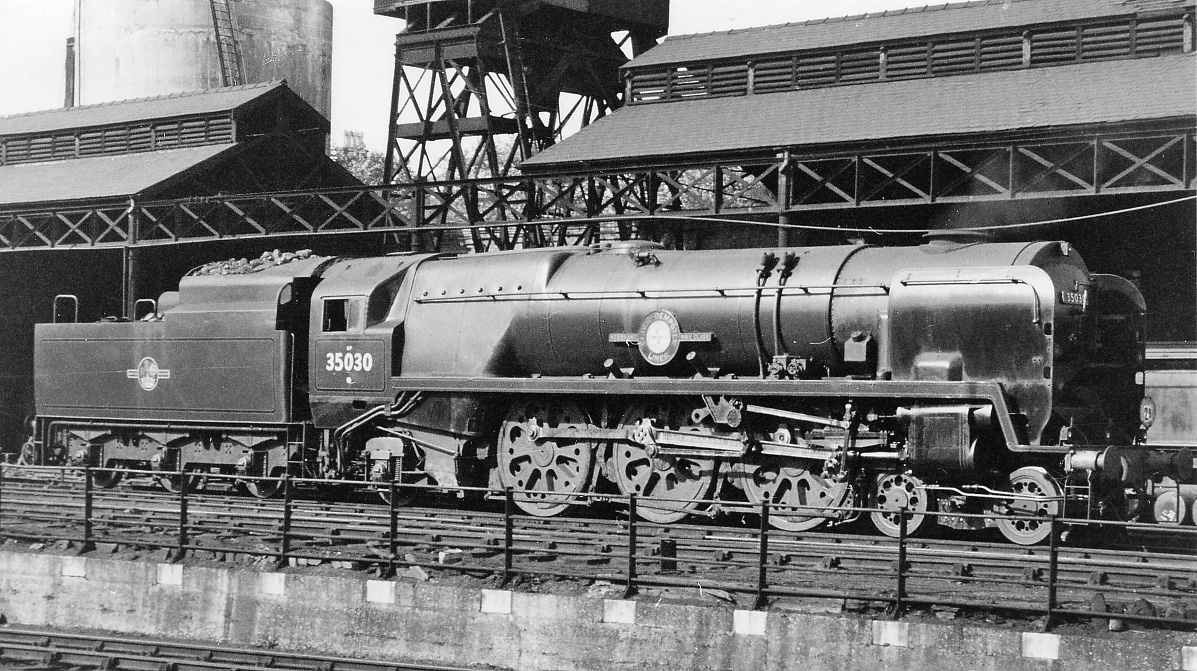
- Rebuilt 35030 Elder Dempster Lines in May 1958, without casing and with Walschaerts valve gear
Type and origin
- Power type: Steam
- Designer: R. G. Jarvis after Oliver Bulleid
- Rebuilder: Eastleigh Works
- Rebuild date: 1956–1960
- Number rebuilt: 30
Specifications
- Configuration
  - Whyte: 4-6-2 (Pacific)
- Gauge: 4 ft 8 1/2 in (1,435 mm)
- Leading dia.: 3 ft 1 in (0.940 m)
- Driver dia.: 6 ft 2 in (1.880 m)
- Trailing dia.: 3 ft 7 in (1.092 m)
- Length: 71 ft 7 in (21.82 m)
- Loco weight: 97.90 long tons (99.5 t)
- Fuel type: Coal
- Fuel capacity: 5 long tons (5.1 t)
- Water cap.: 6,000 imp gal (27,280 L; 7,210 US gal)
- Firebox
  - Grate area: 48.5 sq ft (4.51 m^{2})
- Boiler pressure: 250 psi (1.72 MPa)
- Cylinders: 3
- Cylinder size: 18 in × 24 in (457 mm × 610 mm)
Performance figures
- Tractive effort: 33,495 lbf (149.0 kN)
Career
- Operators: British Railways
- Class: Merchant Navy
- Power class: 8P
- Locale: South West Main Line
- Withdrawn: 1964–1967
- Disposition: 11 preserved, remainder scrapped

Partially because of the Crewkerne incident (when a crank axle of number 35020 Bibby Line disintegrated at speed because of metal fatigue), and due to the incessant modification of Bulleid's original design, British Railways took the decision to rebuild the entire class to a more conventional design by R. G. Jarvis, adopting many features from the BR 'Standard' locomotive classes that had been introduced since 1950. The air-smoothed casing was removed and replaced with conventional boiler cladding, and the chain-driven valve gear was replaced with three separate sets of Walschaerts valve gear. The rebuilds were provided with a completely revised cylindrical smokebox, a new Lord Nelson-type chimney and LMS-style smoke deflectors. Together with the lack of air-smoothed casing, these helped reduce the problem of smoke and steam obscuring the driver's vision of the line.

The fast-moving and unpredictable Bulleid steam reverser was replaced with a screw-link version, whilst the mechanical lubricators were moved to the footplates along the boiler sides. Sanding was also added to the leading driving axle, whilst rearward application was incorporated to the middle driving axle. The first 'modified' locomotive to be released from Eastleigh was 35018 British India Line in 1956. The final example, 35028 Clan Line, was completed in 1960. The success of the modification programme for the Merchant Navy class was also to influence the design of the future modification of 60 'Light Pacifics'.

== Performance of the modified locomotives ==
There is no doubt that rebuilding the class solved most of the maintenance problems, whilst retaining the good features, thereby creating excellent locomotives. One minor drawback was that the 'modifieds' put greater loads on the track as a result of hammerblow, caused by the balance weights for the outside Walschaerts valve gear, whereas the original valve gear design was largely self-balanced. On 26 June 1967, 35003 Royal Mail recorded the highest speed ever for the class. Hauling a train comprising three carriages and two parcels vans (164 tons tare, 180 tons gross) between Weymouth and Waterloo, the mile between milepost 38 and milepost 37 (located between Winchfield and Fleet) was covered in 34 seconds, a speed of 105.88 mph. This was also the last authenticated speed in excess of 100 mph achieved by a steam locomotive in the United Kingdom, until the same mark was attained in 2017 by Tornado.

== Accidents and incidents ==
- On 17 December 1942, No. 21C6 Peninsular & Oriental S. N. Co. sustained a broken chain near Honiton. The sump was fractured leading to an oil fire.
- On 7 October 1943, No. 21C1 Channel Packet sustained a broken chain at Salisbury. The sump was fractured leading to an oil fire.
- On 29 January 1945, No. 21C12 United States Lines sustained a broken chain.
- On 24 April 1953, the crank axle on the central driving wheel of No. 35020 "Bibby Line" fractured whilst approaching Crewkerne station at speed. No-one was injured, but the incident resulted in the withdrawal of all Merchant Navy class locomotives from service whilst the cause was ascertained. An examination of other class members showed that the fracture, caused by metal fatigue, was a common fault. To cover the motive power shortage caused by the mass withdrawal of thirty locomotives, classes from other British Railways regions were drafted in to deputise. The incident resulted in a redesign and replacement of the crank axle.

== Withdrawal ==
Their principal work was on the South West Main Line to Southampton and Bournemouth until 1967. However, the main reason why the class began to be withdrawn in 1964 was the transfer of the main line between Salisbury and Exeter to the Western Region and the introduction of "Warship" class diesel-hydraulic locomotives on these services. The rebuilt locomotives were therefore withdrawn relatively soon after their rebuilding, whilst still in excellent condition. The first two to be withdrawn were the second prototype 35002 Union Castle and 35015 Rotterdam Lloyd in February 1964. Nearly half of the class had been withdrawn by the end of 1965, but seven survived until the end of steam on the Southern Region in the summer of 1967.

Table of withdrawals
Year	Quantity in service at start of year	Number withdrawn	Quantity withdrawn	Locomotive numbers
1964	30	7	7	35001–02/06/09/15/18/25
1965	23	7	14	35004–05/16/19–21/24
1966	16	6	20	35010–11/17/22/27/29
1967	10	10	30	35003/07–08/12–14/23/26/28/30

== Preservation ==
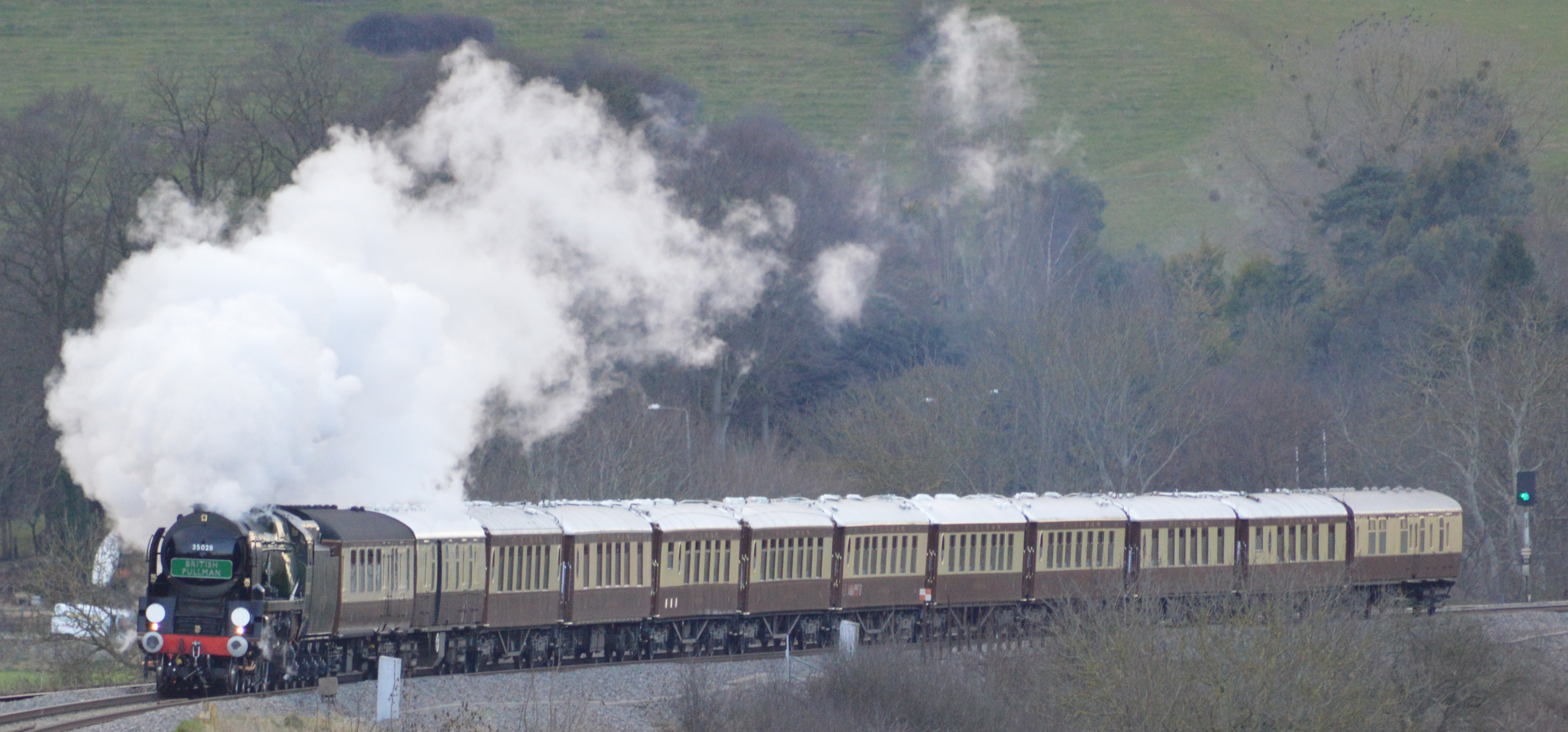
35028 Clan Line hauling the VSOE British Pullman in 2013, west of Bath

Eleven of the class survived into preservation, thanks largely to the high workload of Woodham Brothers Scrapyard in Barry, Vale of Glamorgan, South Wales, which found it easier and more lucrative to scrap railway wagons, keeping the more technical steam locomotives for a downturn in workload. Five of the surviving Merchant Navies have run in preservation: 35005, 35006, 35018, 35027 and 35028. Three members of the class, 35005, 35018 and 35028, have operated on the mainline in preservation.

Ten locomotives ended up at the Barry Scrapyard. One however, No. 35028 Clan Line, was purchased by the Merchant Navy Locomotive Preservation Society direct from British Railways service in 1967. Clan Line has since been regarded as the flagship of the class. Five examples have returned to steam, but it is unlikely that many of the remainder will do so, as the class is too large and heavy for use on most of today's heritage railways.

As the entire fleet was rebuilt from 1956 onwards, no examples exist in their original condition, although a team is attempting to reverse-engineer No. 35011 General Steam Navigation with its air-smoothed casing and chain-driven valve gear. Other relics of the class have survived in the guise of locomotive nameplates and smokebox number plates, which were taken from their locomotives towards the end of steam on the British Railways Southern Region in the 1960s. As a result, many exist in private collections and several have been seen at auctions, selling for several thousands of pounds.

=== Preserved Merchant Navy class locomotives ===
Number	Name	Built	Rebuilt	Withdrawn	Service life	Location	Livery	Status	Main line certified	Image	Notes
35005	Canadian Pacific	Dec 1941	May 1959	Oct 1965	23 Years, 10 months	Watercress Line	BR Lined Green, Late Crest (on completion)	Operational	No		Owned by Mid Hants Railway Preservation Society
35006	Peninsular & Oriental S.N. Co.	Dec 1941	Oct 1959	Aug 1964	22 Years, 8 months	Gloucestershire Warwickshire Railway	BR Lined Green, Late Crest	Operational, boiler ticket expires 2025	No		
35009	Shaw Savill	Jul 1942	Mar 1957	Sept 1964	22 Years, 2 months	East Lancashire Railway	N/A	Undergoing restoration from scrapyard condition	No, to be certified		Owned by Ian Riley of Riley & Son, Bury
35010	Blue Star	Aug 1942	Jan 1957	Sept 1966	24 Years, 1 month	Colne Valley Railway	N/A	Stored, awaiting restoration	No		
35011	General Steam Navigation	Dec 1944	Jul 1959	Feb 1966	21 Years, 2 months	Private site, Dorset	N/A	Undergoing restoration to as-built condition with air-smoothed casing	No, to be certified		
35018	British India Line	May 1945	Feb 1956	Aug 1964	19 Years, 3 months	Carnforth MPD	BR Lined Green, Late Crest	Operational, boiler ticket expires: 2027	Yes (2017 – ongoing)		First of the class to be rebuilt
35022	Holland America Line	Oct 1948	Jun 1956	May 1966	17 Years, 7 months	Crewe Diesel TMD	N/A	Stored, awaiting restoration from scrapyard condition	No, to be certified		
35025	Brocklebank Line	Nov 1948	Dec 1956	Sept 1964	15 Years, 10 months	Private Site, Sellindge, Kent	N/A	Undergoing restoration from scrapyard condition	No		
35027	Port Line	Dec 1948	May 1957	Sept 1966	17 Years, 9 months	Crewe Diesel TMD	N/A	Stored, awaiting overhaul	No, to be certified		Last ran in 2003
35028	Clan Line	Dec 1948	Oct 1959	Jul 1967	18 Years, 7 months	Stewarts Lane TMD	BR Lined Green, Late Crest	Undergoing Repairs, boiler ticket expires: 2034	Yes (2017 - ongoing)		Undergoing firebox repairs and retube.
35029	Ellerman Lines	Feb 1949	Sept 1959	Jul 1966	17 Years, 7 months	National Railway Museum	BR Lined Green, Late Crest	Static display	No		Sectioned on fireman's side to show internal workings

== Livery ==
=== Southern Railway ===
The class's livery was Southern Railway malachite green with "sunshine yellow" horizontal lining and lettering. The first five locomotives were given a matt finish so as to obscure small irregularities in the casing. All class members that operated during the Second World War were eventually repainted in Southern Railway wartime black livery, with green-shaded "Sunshine" lettering. However, this was reverted to malachite green livery upon the ending of hostilities.

21C1 Channel Packet originally had an inverted horseshoe on the smokebox door, indicating its Southern origin, but crews believed this to be unlucky. A resultant re-design meant that this became a roundel, the gap being filled by the year of construction, so it acted as a builder's plate. The background was painted red. Early members of the class had cast-iron numberplates and gilt 'Southern' plates on the tender, but these were subsequently replaced by transfers.

=== British Railways ===
After nationalisation in 1948, the locomotives' initial livery was a slightly modified Southern malachite green livery, where "British Railways" replaced "Southern" in Sunshine Yellow lettering on the tender sides. The Bulleid numbering system was temporarily retained, with an additional "S" prefix, such as S21C1. A short-lived second livery was an experimental purple with red lining, as applied to 35024 East Asiatic Company. This was replaced by British Railways express passenger blue with black and white lining. From 1952, the locomotives carried the standard British Railways Brunswick green livery with orange and black lining and the British Railways crest on the tender tank sides. This livery was perpetuated after rebuilding.

== Operational assessment ==
The class in both as-built and modified forms has been subject to a range of divergent opinions. The utilisation of welded steel construction and the various innovations that had not previously been seen in British locomotive design meant that the class earned Bulleid the title "Last Giant of Steam". The constant concern for ease of maintenance and utility had not previously been seen on locomotives of older design, whilst their highly efficient boilers represented the ultimate in British steam technology, the hallmark of a successful locomotive design. Despite this, the number of innovations introduced at the same time made the class unreliable and difficult to maintain during the first few years of service. Many of these difficulties were overcome during the rebuilding, leading to D.L. Bradley's statement that the modified locomotives were "the finest express locomotives to work in the country". Overall, the class was largely successful, with half of the locomotives completing more than 1 million miles in revenue-earning service.

== Models ==
Makers of models of Merchant Navy locomotives include Hornby Railways, Graham Farish and Minitrix. The first OO gauge model of an as-built locomotive was produced by Graham Farish in 1950 followed by Hornby/Wrenn in 1962 and by the modified version.

In 1959, Tri-ang Railways produced a TT gauge version of Clan Line.

Hornby and Graham Farish currently produce the rebuilt version of the class in OO gauge and N gauge respectively. The Hornby model was introduced in the 2000 edition of the Hornby catalogue. As of December 2010, fifteen members of the class have been produced.

In March 2015, Hornby announced the inclusion of a new as-built version of the class in OO gauge in their 2016 range; this model was subsequently postponed to the 2017 range.

== See also ==
- List of SR Merchant Navy class locomotives
