= Ron Jarvis =

British locomotive engineer

Ronald Guy Jarvis
- Born: 5 November 1911; Harpenden
- Died: 2 September 1994 (aged 82); Llandudno
- Engineering career
- Discipline: Locomotive engineering

Ronald Guy Jarvis was a British locomotive engineer, born 5 November 1911 in Harpenden, Hertfordshire, England. Jarvis apprenticed at Derby Works under George Ivatt.

== Career ==
=== Wartime work ===
During World War II Jarvis was sent to Turkey to oversee the assembly of the TCDD 45151 Class (LMS Stanier Class 8Fs), and then to India with William Stanier.

=== British Railways ===
After the war, he worked briefly under Ivatt before being transferred to Brighton Works on the Southern Region of the newly nationalised British Railways, replacing Oliver Bulleid. From 1956, the Merchant Navy and West Country/Battle of Britain classes of his predecessor were rebuilt to a design set out by Jarvis, removing all eccentricities that had plagued the maintenance of these locomotives.

=== High Speed Train project ===
Jarvis returned to Derby to oversee the development of the Class 43 InterCity 125 power cars.

== Death ==
Jarvis died in Llandudno on 2 September 1994, and was buried at Llanbedr.
