= GWR 4575 Class 5542 =

Preserved British steam locomotive

5542
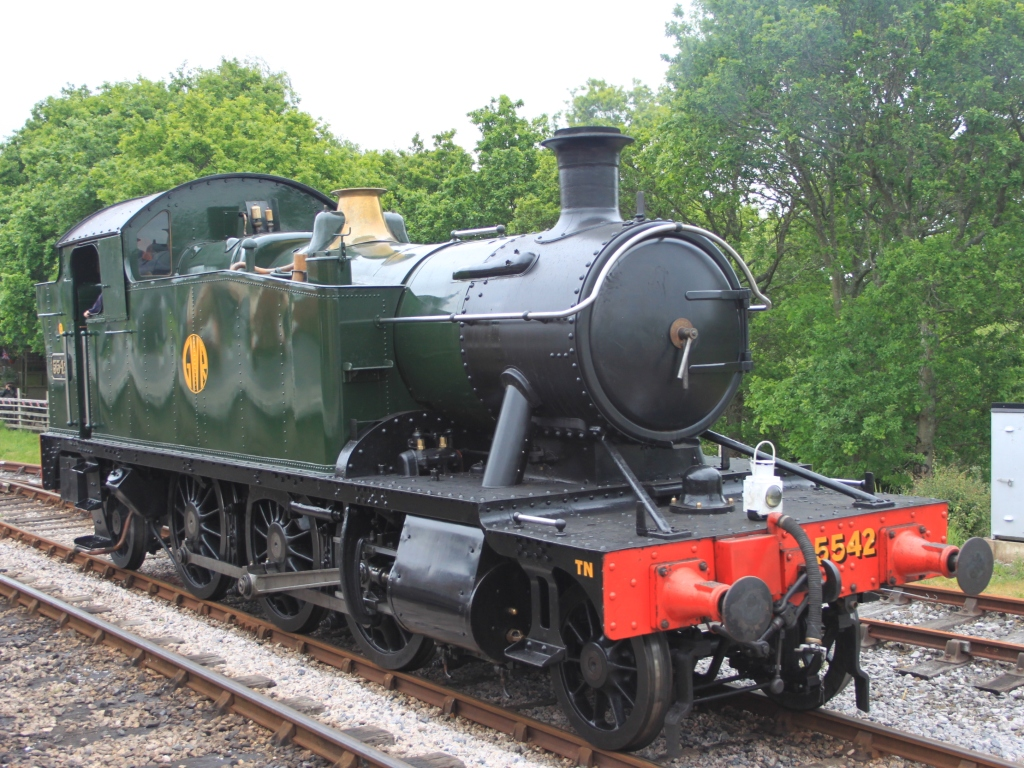
- 5542 at Totnes (Riverside)
Type and origin
- Power type: Steam
- Build date: 1928
Specifications
- Gauge: 4 ft 8 1/2 in (1,435 mm)
Career
- Operators: Great Western Railway, British Railways
- Class: GWR 4575 class
- Numbers: 5542
- Retired: 1961
- Current owner: 5542 fund
- Disposition: Out of service for overhaul since 2022

GWR 5542 is a preserved Great Western Railway steam locomotive of the GWR 4575 Class. It is currently based at South Devon Railway.

== History ==
Number 5542 was built in 1928 for £3602. It was first allocated to Gloucester entering traffic on 2 August 1928, then later at Bristol Bath Road, Taunton and Newton Abbot and finally Westbury from where it was withdrawn on 8 December 1961 after having run 987,429 miles. It was sold to for scrap to the Woodham Brothers in February 1962.

5542 appears in the TV series "Land Girls" in the episode "Destinies", originally aired on 11 September 2009.

== Preservation ==
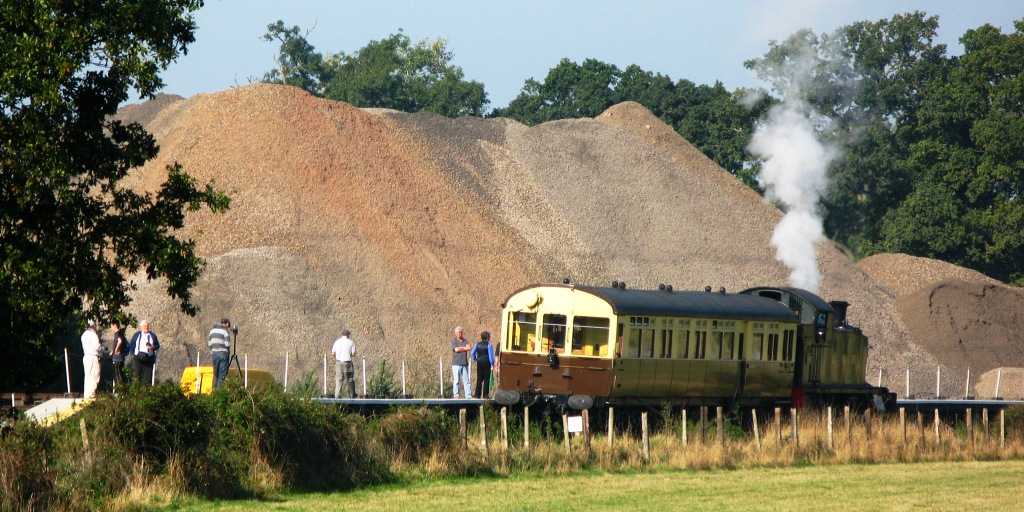
5542 with a former-GWR Autocoach at Norton Fitzwarren railway station on the West Somerset Railway

After many years in the scrapyard at Barry it was sold to the West Somerset Railway Association (WSRA) in 1976. In 1979 it was sold again to some members of the WSRA and entered service on the West Somerset Railway in 2002.

The 5542 Fund then continued as a support and fund raising body, which over the years has raised an average of £500 per month from a variety of fund raising initiatives.
