= SR Merchant Navy Class 35009 Shaw Savill =

Preserved British locomotive

35009 Shaw Savill
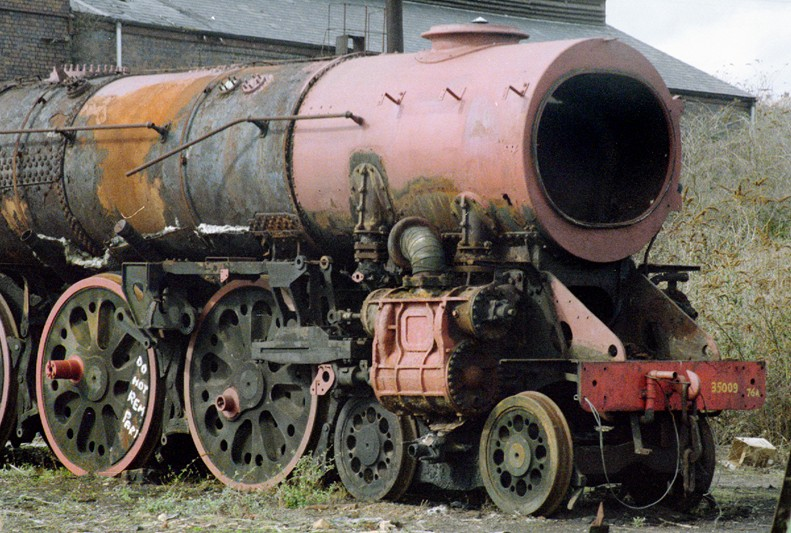
- 35009 Shaw Savill stood inside Woodham Brothers scrapyard.
Type and origin
- Power type: Steam
- Builder: Eastleigh Works
- Build date: Jul 1942
- Rebuild date: Mar 1957
Specifications
- Configuration
  - Whyte: 4-6-2
- Gauge: 4 ft 8 1/2 in (1,435 mm)
- Driver dia.: 6 ft 2 in (1.88 m)
- Wheelbase: 61 ft 6 in (18.75 m)
- Length: 71 ft 7¾ in (21.84 m)
- Total weight: 94 tons 15 cwt (96,270 kg, c. 212,240 lb)
- Boiler pressure: 280 psi (19.31 bar; 1.93 MPa), later reduced to 250 psi (17.24 bar; 1.72 MPa)
- Cylinders: 3
- Cylinder size: 18 in bore x 24 in stoke (457 x 610 mm)
- Loco brake: Vacuum (Air brakes fitted)
- Safety systems: AWS, TPWS, OTMR, GSM-R
Performance figures
- Tractive effort: 33,495 lbf (149.0 kN) (previously 37,515 lbf (166.9 kN))
Career
- Operators: British Railways
- Class: Merchant Navy
- Power class: SR: A; BR: 8P
- Numbers: SR 21C09; BR 35009
- Official name: Shaw Savill
- Withdrawn: September 1964
- Current owner: Ian Riley

SR Merchant Navy Class No. 35009 Shaw Savill is a 're-built' SR Merchant Navy class 'Pacific' (4-6-2) steam locomotive, named after the Shaw Savill Line, a British merchant shipping company. The locomotive was built at Eastleigh Works in June 1942 in its original air-smoothed form, and given the number 21C9. One of a batch of eight Merchant Navy class locomotives whose air-smoothed casing was made of asbestos board, 21C9 was from the start in wartime black livery. It was allocated to Salisbury shed.

Between 1945 and 1947, the Merchant Navy class were repainted in Malachite green livery, with yellow lining. 21C9 was one of several in a variant of this livery, in which the smokebox cowls were painted green instead of black. Shaw Savill was repainted in British Railways blue livery in August 1949, and in Brunswick Green in February 1953.

Between 1956 and 1960, locomotives of the Merchant Navy class were rebuilt and the air-smoothed casing removed. Shaw Savill was rebuilt in March 1957, withdrawn from service in July 1964 and arrived at Woodham Brothers scrapyard in Barry, Vale of Glamorgan, South Wales, in December 1964. At the time of withdrawal it had travelled 1,127,452 miles.

Some time after 1984, the locomotive left Barry for preservation on the Mid Hants Railway (Watercress Line). It spent just over 4 years there but with the Mid Hants railway buying more locos it was decided to move 35009 Shaw Savill again, to Bury.

By late 2009, Shaw Savill lay dismantled at Buckley Wells shed in Bury. Its current owner Ian Riley had previously offered the locomotive for sale. By 2019, Shaw Savill was still in unrestored condition following years of storage outside the shed in Bury; in September it was announced that the engine was to be restored to working order. The engine's frames, boiler and other parts were moved to Riley & Son Ltd in Heywood for restoration to mainline standard.

== Photographic chronology ==
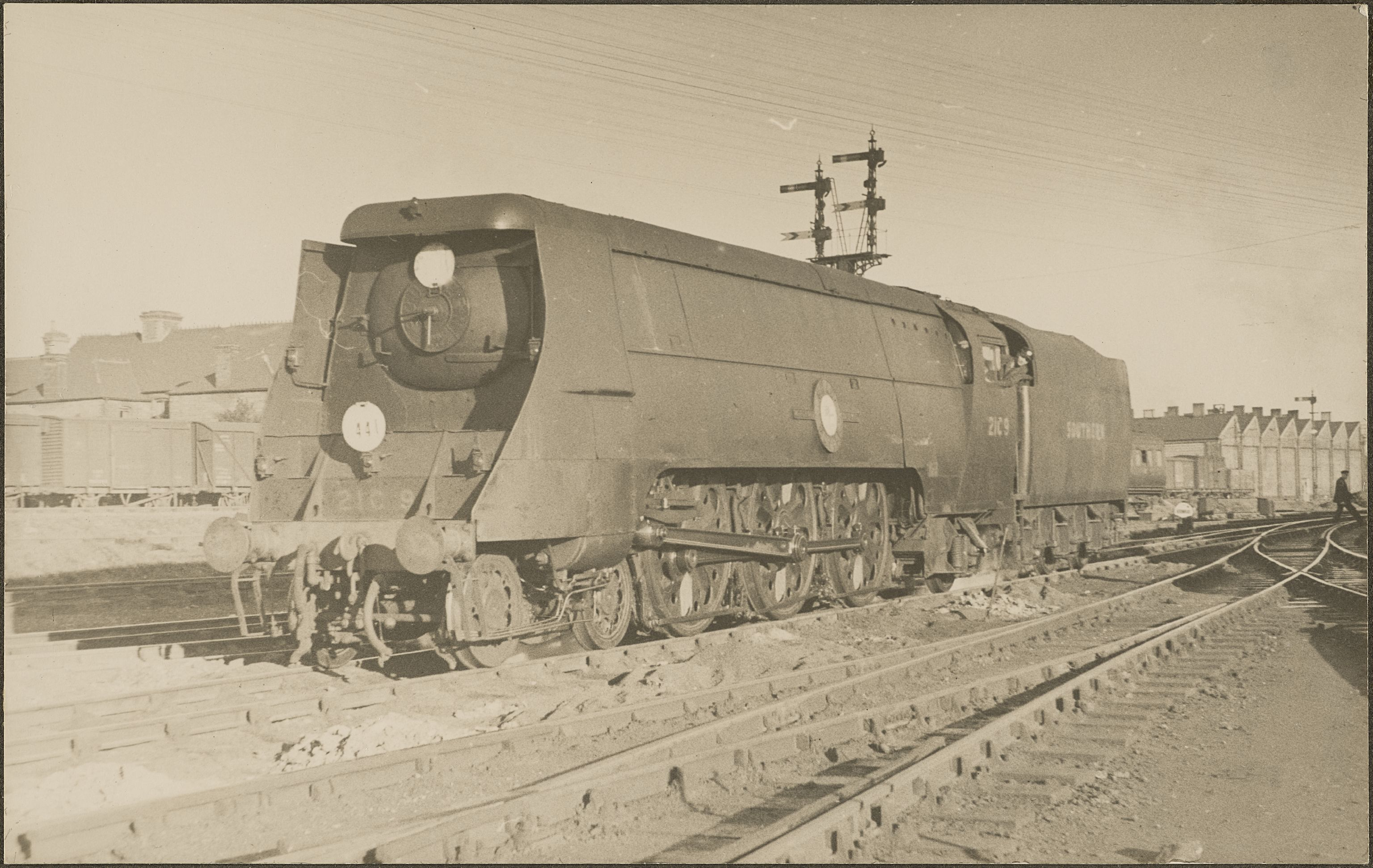

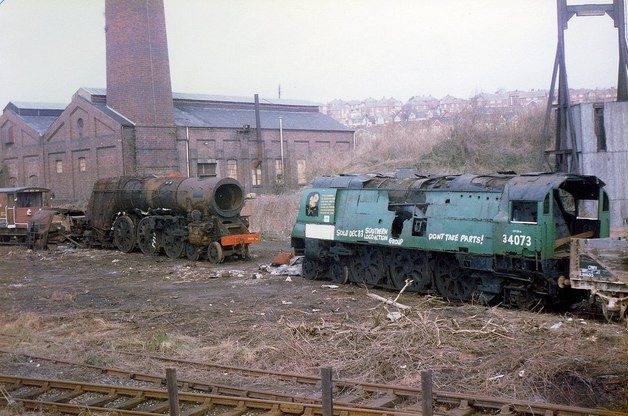
35009 Shaw Savill (left) with Battle of Britain class 34073 249 Squadron (right)
at Woodham's Scrapyard, Barry in 1984

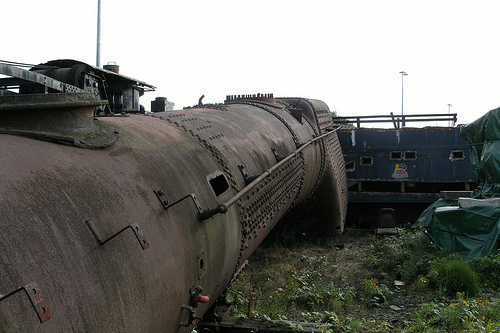
Boiler of Shaw Savill in the yard at Baron street, Bury
