= Bulleid chain-driven valve gear =

Steam locomotive component

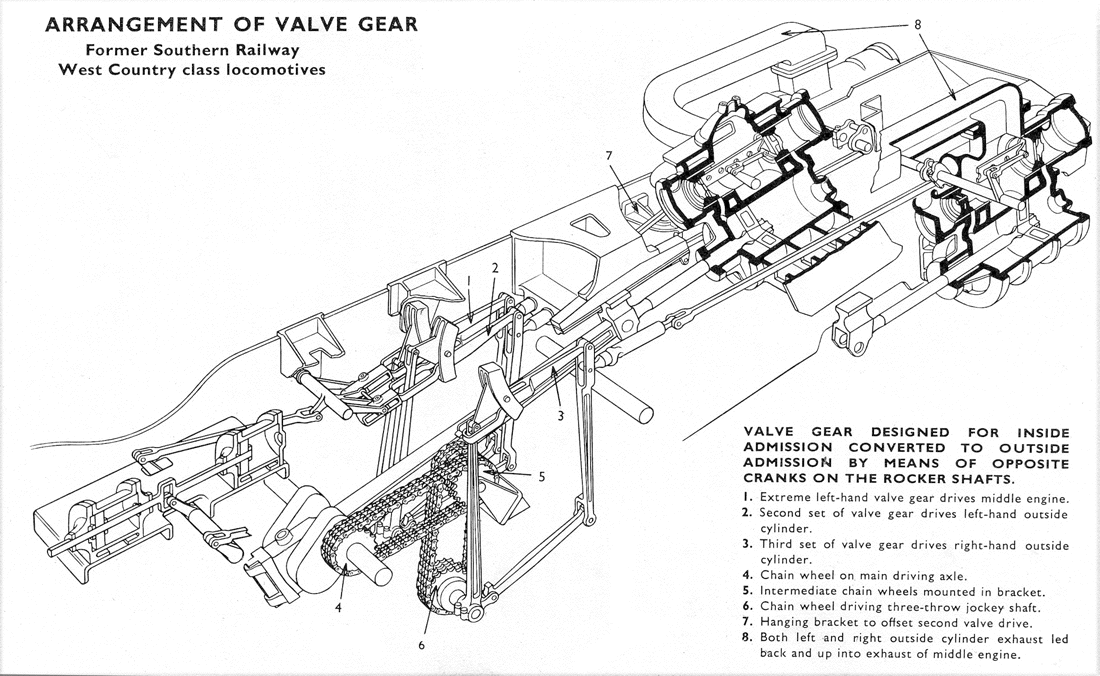
Cutaway diagram

The Bulleid chain-driven valve gear is a type of steam locomotive valve gear designed by Oliver Bulleid during the Second World War for use on his Pacific (4-6-2) designs. It was peculiar to the Southern Railway in Britain, and borrowed from motor-vehicle practice in an attempt to create a compact and efficient design with a minimum of service requirements.

== Design principles ==
Bulleid's decision to have three cylinders, all driving the middle coupled axle of his Merchant Navy and West Country / Battle of Britain classes, gave rise to several problems. As each cylinder was to have its own separate valve gear, this left very little space for the conventional inside set of motion. This prompted Bulleid to design a new miniaturised Walschaerts motion that was compact enough to enclose the whole system in a casing. All three sets of valve gear were worked from an auxiliary three-throw crankshaft. A Morse inverted-tooth drive chain ran horizontally from a triple sprocket on the driving axle to an idler sprocket, from which a second chain ran downwards to the crankshaft. By the use of two chains the valve gear was isolated from the movement of the driving axle on its springs. The idler sprocket could be moved to give both chains the correct tension, but in practice only the vertical chain was adjusted.

The auxiliary crankshaft drove both the eccentric rods and the combination levers of the valve gear. The piston valves were of the outside admission type. The valve heads were connected by a double girder arrangement, each actuated by a vertical rocking shaft located between the two girders and midway between the two heads, with a further connecting link pivoted just behind the valve head nearest the front. A sealed oscillating shaft drove the offset upper rocker arm and link, and the whole assembly worked inside the exhaust space of the steam chest. The advantage of having admission steam working on the outside faces of the valves meant that the volume under maximum pressure was completely sealed at the ends with no glands susceptible to leakage.

The valve motions and the inside connecting rod were enclosed in an oil bath consisting of a vertical steel box located between the main frame members, containing 40 imperial gallons (182 litres; 48 US gallons) of oil. About 2 inches (51 mm) depth of oil lay in the bath; the inside big end was splash-lubricated, and two pumps sprayed oil through perforated pipes over the various valve motion pins. None of this was particularly revolutionary, being borrowed from internal-combustion engine practice; and for use with steam it was established practice for steam motors at the Sentinel Waggon Works. It was thought that the arrangement would obviate the daily need to oil all moving parts and as they were protected from the elements they should be able to run 100,000 miles (160,000 km) without attention. It was this consideration that meant the continued use of the system, albeit in modified form, on Bulleid's Leader class.

== Problems ==
In practice, the arrangement had a number of disadvantages. Cracks developed in the oil bath casing due to incorrect welding procedure. Condensation caused corrosion, and oil leaked out through inadequate seals, causing wheelslip and fire hazards. Valve timing was highly unpredictable; this has been attributed to chain stretch, although Bulleid claimed that it was allowed for. The chains were replaced as part of a valve and piston examination at around 30,000 to 36,000 miles (48,000 to 58,000 km), by which time they were considerably worn. This wear, in the chain pins and sprockets, could result in an elongation of the chains by as much as 6 inches (15.2 cm). Bulleid asserted that a slack of 3 inches (76.2 mm) would be absorbed by the chain coming under load, with the remaining valve irregularity corrected by adjusting the cut-off.

Chain-stretch is widely considered to be the cause of the gear's inefficiencies, but another cause may have been geometrical due to the sequential proportions of levers, especially the multiplying rockers that transmitted the limited movement of the "miniaturised" valve gear to the union link driving the long travel piston valve. These rockers alone would have made accurate valve timing difficult to achieve, giving rise to stress in the drive mechanism, a symptom of which would be an increase in the likelihood of chain-stretch. The maximum throw of the expansion links was 2.25 inches (5.7 cm). To provide the maximum valve travel of 6 inches (15.2 cm) the rocker arms multiplied the motion of the auxiliary crankshaft in the ratio 8:3. The effects of wear in the pin joints, also multiplied by the same ratio, caused valve openings to vary between cylinders even if the driver maintained the same cut-off.

A further complication was the unpredictable behaviour of the Eastleigh type of steam reverser employed. If this reverser misbehaved under the fluctuating pressures present in the steam chest, the locomotive seemed to have a will of its own. For example, if the reverser dropped into full gear, the slackness in the motion would make the valves overrun their designed full travel. This would result in the locomotive taking off like an unleashed race horse, high coal consumption, throwing the fire out of the chimney and running the risk of a violent high-speed slipping.

These problems combined contributed to the gear's eventual replacement by three separate sets of Walschaerts gear mounted in the conventional manner.
