= SR Merchant Navy Class 35027 Port Line =

35027 Port Line
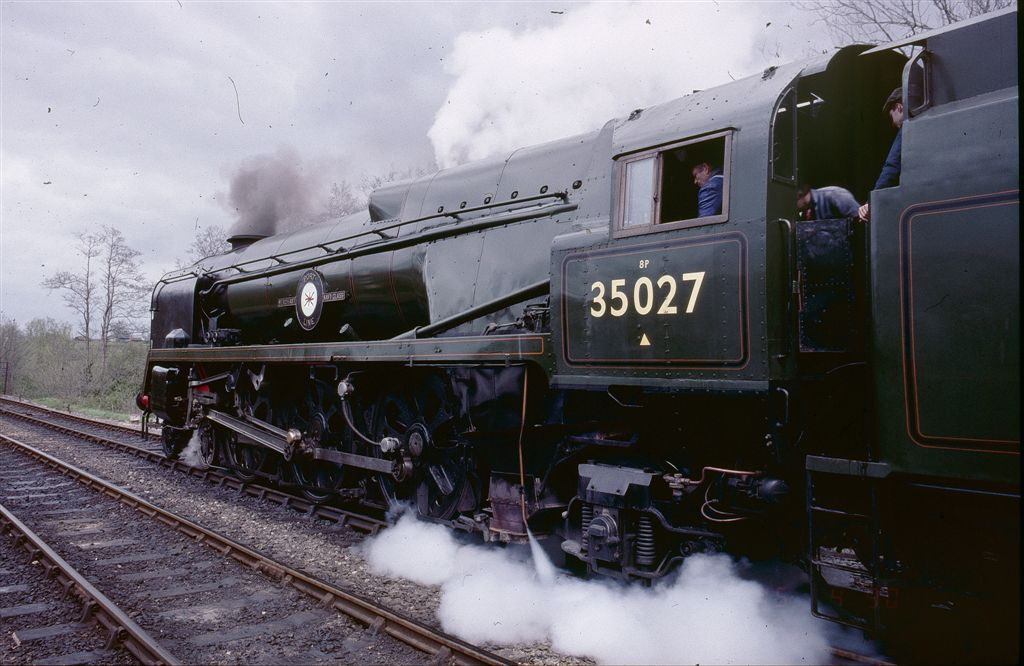
- 35027 at the Bluebell Railway
Type and origin
- Power type: Steam
- Builder: Eastleigh Works
- Build date: December 1948
Specifications
- Configuration
  - Whyte: 4-6-2
- Gauge: 4 ft 8 1/2 in (1,435 mm)
- Driver dia.: 6 ft 2 in (1.88 m)
- Wheelbase: 61 ft 6 in (18.75 m)
- Length: 71 ft 7¾ in (21.84 m)
- Total weight: 94 tons 15 cwt (96,270 kg, c. 212,240 lb)
- Boiler pressure: 250 psi (1.73 MPa)
- Cylinders: 3
- Cylinder size: 18 in bore x 24 in stroke (457 x 610 mm)
Performance figures
- Tractive effort: 33,495 lbf (148.99 kN)
Career
- Operators: British Railways
- Class: Merchant Navy
- Numbers: 35027
- Official name: Port Line
- Last run: 1966
- Withdrawn: 1967
- Restored: 1988

35027 Port Line was one of a batch of ten SR Merchant Navy class steam locomotives built by the Southern Region of British Railways between 1948 and 1949.

Completed at Eastleigh Works in December 1948, it was named on 24 April 1950 in Southampton Docks. Port Line was shedded at Bournemouth with others of the class such as Canadian Pacific. Along with the rest of the class, Port Line was rebuilt by removal of the air-smoothed casing at Eastleigh in 1957, and this rebuilding made them similar to the BR Standard class engines of the time. Two years later, it pulled the British Royal Train from Windsor to Hamworthy Junction. Last working from Weymouth in 1966, it was withdrawn at the end of steam on the Southern Region in 1967 and sent to Woodham Brothers scrapyard in Barry, South Wales.

Port Line was not as fortunate as 35028 Clan Line, which went straight into preservation. Port Line stayed in the scrapyard until May 1982, when it was saved; this was part of a BBC documentary The Train Now Departing.

After restoration, Port Line was based at the Bluebell Railway from 1988 until 2000, last working on the Bluebell in 1996. 35027 moved to the Swanage Railway in early 2000, further boiler work allowing it to operate a limited number of steamings from November 2000 until October 2003, when it was stopped with firebox cracks. Port Line was sold in 2004 to Jeremy Hosking, and moved to Southall. In January 2011, transferred to the Royal Scot Locomotive and General Trust (RSL&GT), Port Line was moved to Ian Riley's workshops at Bury on the East Lancashire Railway for overhaul to mainline standard, using the boiler from 35022 Holland America Line. From 2007 to 2011, 35027's tender had been in use with rebuilt West Country class 34046 Braunton, owned by Hosking. It was until recently in use behind unrebuilt West Country class 34007 Wadebridge.

== See also ==
- Southern Locomotives Ltd
