= Shaw Savill Line =

London shipping company (1858–1883)

- Industry: Shipping and transportation
- Founded: 1858
- Defunct: 1882
- Fate: Merged into Shaw, Savill & Albion Line
- Headquarters: London, United Kingdom

A poster of the Shaw, Savill Line promoting immigration to New Zealand in the 1870s

Shaw Savill Line of London was a shipping company set up to transport both produce and passengers between Great Britain and New Zealand.

Robert Edward Shaw and Walter Savill (employees of Willis, Gann and Company, a London ship-broking and chartering firm) set up on their own account in 1858 and began chartering ships. They bought their first ship in 1865. While the trading name, Shaw Savill, remained the same, the partners who owned it changed a number of times. In 1871, the company purchased the iron-hulled Euterpe, and used her to ferry emigrants to New Zealand. The Euterpe was later sold and renamed the Star of India, and is preserved in San Diego as the oldest regularly sailing ship in the world.

== Burning of the Cospatrick ==
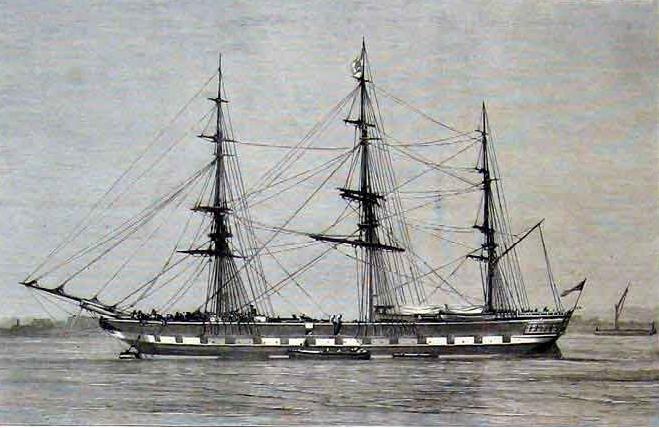
Cospatrick in Gravesend Reach, Wood engraving from a newspaper

On 17 November 1874 the wooden Shaw Savill emigrant ship Cospatrick bound for New Zealand burnt at sea south of the Cape of Good Hope with 476 lives lost, with only three survivors .

There were lifeboats for only a third of those on board, the fire was believed to have been started by crewmen while plundering cargo.

== Sinking of the Avalanche ==
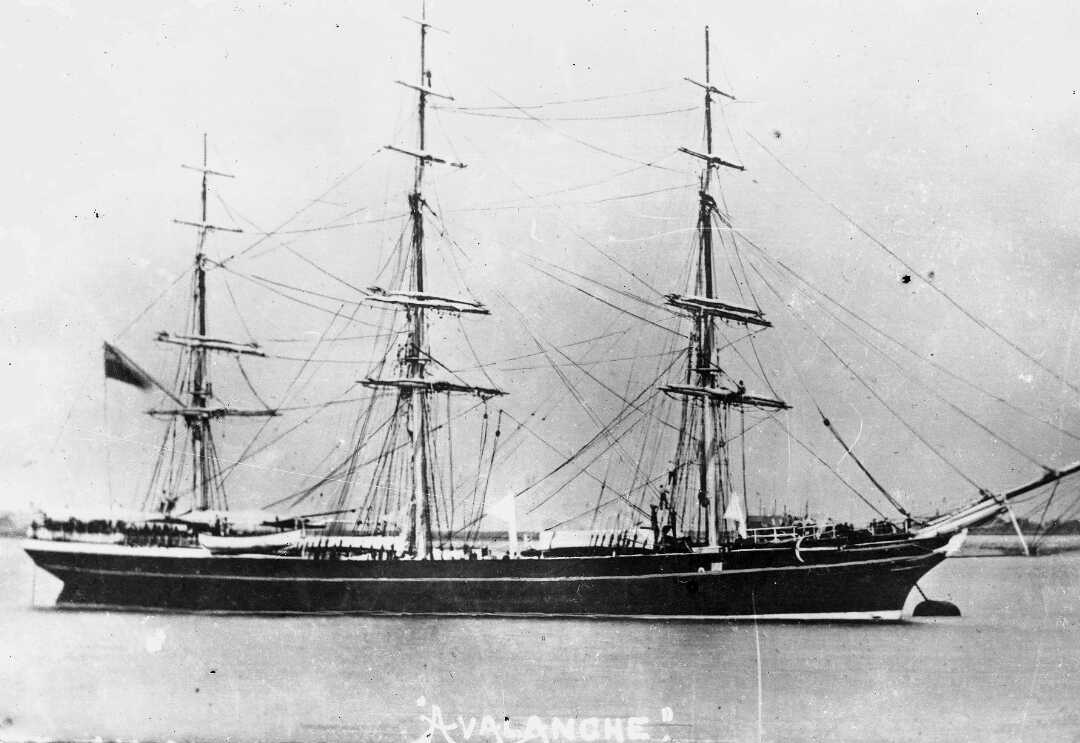
Avalanche in 1875

Avalanche en route London to Wellington built of iron not wood was struck twice or more amidships after dark near Portland, Dorset by an American ship, Forest, in ballast, on 11 September 1877 with the loss of more than 100 lives. Witnesses reported the Avalanche foundered within four minutes and there was no time to launch boats.

The New Zealand Government bought land nearby and it was planned to erect a small church in memory of the passengers and crew.

Most passengers were returning residents of Wellington and Wanganui. From the Avalanche 63 passengers and 34 seamen of which three seamen were saved, from the Forest no passengers but a crew of 21 of which nine were saved.

== Albion line ==
The company, by then a partnership of Walter Savill and James William Temple, agreed in November 1882 to join the Albion line as of 1 January 1883 to form Shaw, Savill & Albion Line.
