= Woodham Brothers =

Welsh scrapping company

Coordinates: 51°23′45″N 3°16′42″W

Woodham Brothers Ltd
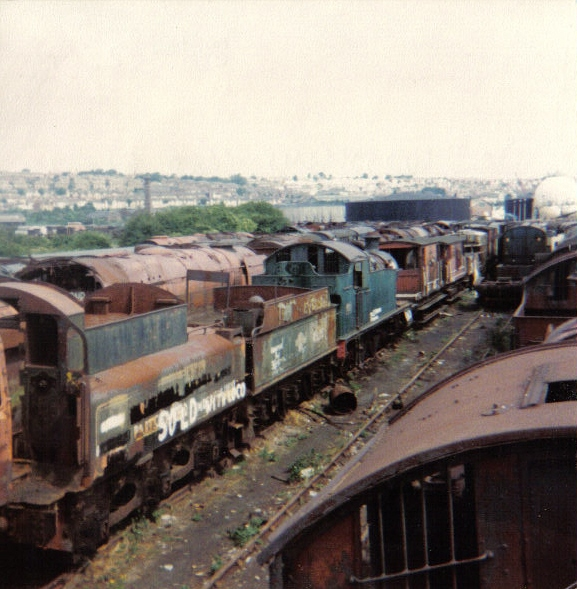
- Woodham Brothers scrapyard in 1982
- Type: Private company
- Industry: Scrap metal Commercial Property
- Founded: 1892; 134 years ago (as Woodham & Sons)
- Headquarters: Barry, Wales
- Key people: Dai Woodham (1919–1994)
- Website: woodhambrosltd.co.uk

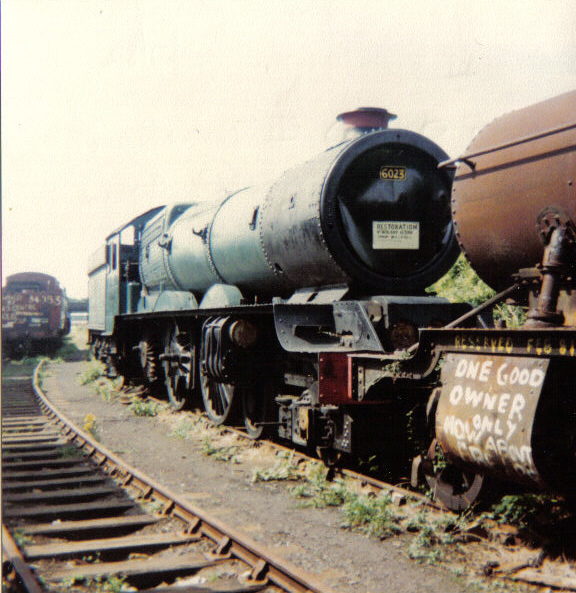
GWR 6000 Class 6023 King Edward II at Woodham Brothers in 1982

Woodham Brothers Ltd is a trading business, based mainly around activities and premises located within Barry Docks, in Barry, South Wales. It is noted globally for its 1960s activity as a scrapyard (hence its colloquial name of Barry Scrapyard), where 297 withdrawn British Railways steam locomotives were sent, from which 213 were rescued for the developing railway preservation movement. In the second half of the 20th century its activity was driven by Dai Woodham.

== History ==
Established in 1892 as Woodham & Sons by Albert Woodham, the company was based at Thomson Street, Barry. The company bought old rope, dunnage wood and scrap metal from the ships, boats and marine businesses which used the newly created Barry Docks, which it then resold or scrapped.

In the 1930s, the Woodhams started to trade in scrap metal.

Albert retired in 1947, when his youngest son, Dai, was demobbed from the British Army after World War II. Dai renamed the business Woodham Brothers Ltd in 1953, creating four lines of business under four separate companies, which between them employed 200 people: Woodham Brothers, Woodham Transport, Woodham Marine and Woodham Metals.

=== 1955 Modernisation Plan/Beeching Report ===
As a result of the 1955 Modernisation Plan the decision was made by the British Railways Board in the late 1950s to:

- accelerate the move to diesel- and electric-powered trains, consequently leading to the scrapping of 16,000 steam locomotives
- reduce the wagon fleet from 1.25 million to 600,000

The strategy chosen to replace the steam locomotive fleet initially involved the replacement of steam shunting and branch line locomotives with diesel-electric traction, and the movement of the replaced small steam locomotives to the major railway works for scrapping. In 1958 the British Transport Commission reappraised the speed of the programme, and the decision was taken to accelerate the disposal of the steam fleet. Although the capacity of the locomotive works was considerable, as a result of the 1958 acceleration the amount of storage and technical scrapping capability of the works became stretched. The British Railways Board decided to out-source via tender to selected scrap merchants the work of scrapping the steam locomotives.

=== Woodhams scrapyard ===
By the mid-1950s, Woodham Brothers was trading mainly as a scrap metal merchants, producing high quality scrap metal for the newly nationalised steel industry. Dai Woodham, as a result of the British Rail decision, negotiated a contract in 1957 to scrap metal mainly from the Western Region, covering like other scrap merchants the easily handled railway line and rolling stock; the more complex steam locomotives were to be handled solely by the railway works. As none of the many South Wales-based scrap merchants knew how long the work from scrapping the short-wheelbase coal wagons from the former South Wales coalfield would last, they all chose to scrap these first.

Each lot of metal was bought at an auction as a piece of rolling stock or infrastructure, with each lot having a priority for scrapping as detailed by British Railways. Woodham's premises which were based at Barry Docks, agreed an extended lease with the British Transport Docks Board, over the former marshalling yards of the almost redundant Barry Docks, close to what were the locomotives works of the former Barry Railway Company close to Barry Island. This allowed them to store large quantities of rolling stock that they had bought from British Railways, before they were scrapped.

The 1958 decision resulted in Woodham Brothers winning a tender to scrap locomotives, and in 1959 Dai Woodham went to Swindon Works for a week to learn how to scrap steam locomotives: "It was a completely different job from what we were used to." On 25 March 1959, the first batch of engines was dispatched from Swindon to Barry: GWR 2-6-0's numbers 5312/60/92/97 and a single 2-6-2T Prairie tank, 3170 a week later.

However, on delivery of both scrap rail and rolling stock, Woodham's found that commercially it was easier to both comply with the contract terms and conditions and turn a profit if they concentrated on the easier to scrap rail profile and rolling stock. There was also at least ten times the volume of wagons, which took up more space and reduced Woodham's capacity to bid on more contracts. Hence it was agreed internally to leave the more difficult locomotives until later, perhaps picking up the work when the volume of rolling stock and railway line abated.

From mid-1964, Woodham Brothers won additional contracts to scrap Southern Region stock, and as a result expanded their Barry Docks yard leases to cover more of the former marshalling yards. In 1965, 65 locomotives had arrived at the scrapyard, of which 28 were scrapped, but the additional volume of Southern rail, wagons and brake vans meant that the autumn of 1965 was the last year that mass-scrapping of steam locomotives occurred at Woodham Brothers. Dai Woodham continued to purchase steam locomotives until the end of steam, bringing total purchases by August 1968 to 297 locomotives, including four Austerity saddle tanks acquired from the Longmoor Military Railway, of which 217 then remained at the Barry scrapyard. The scrapyard continued to purchase withdrawn steam locomotives until the end of steam with the last ones to enter the yard including LMS 8Fs No. 48151 and No. 48305, LNER B1 No. 61264, BR Class 4 Moguls No. 76077/79/84, and BR 9F No. 92212. All of them eventually left the scrapyard.

=== Preservation centre ===
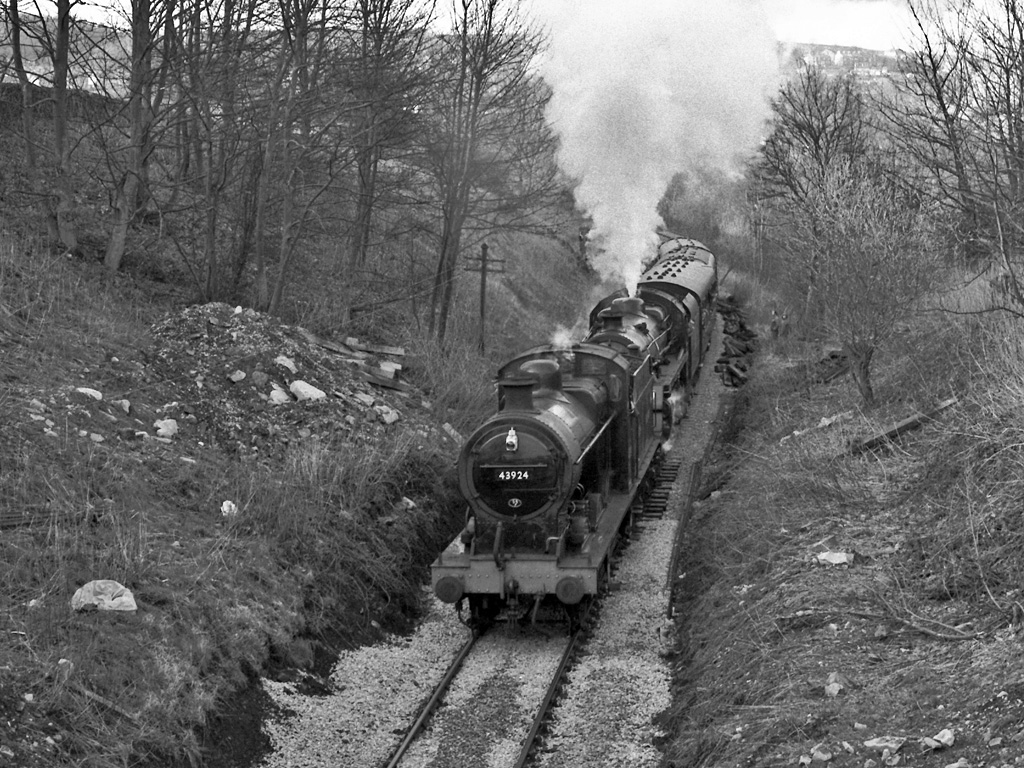
The first locomotive to leave Woodhams for preservation, the Midland-built 4F, No.43924, piloting BR Riddles 'Standard' 4MT 4-6-0 locomotive No.75078, photographed 17 years later in 1983 approaching Ebor Lane road bridge, Haworth on the Keighley and Worth Valley Railway.

The rows of redundant steam locomotives were a picturesque sight for holidaymakers travelling to Barry Island, and became a centre for pilgrimage for steam enthusiasts from the emerging steam railway preservation movement.

While there was still a significant number of steam locomotives in the yard, railway preservationists began buying the better examples from the late 1960s in order to restore them to working order. The first locomotive to be the subject of a rescue appeal was GWR 4300 Class 5322, which eventually did leave Barry in March 1969, becoming the third locomotive to leave, but the first to be bought and actually moved from the yard was Midland Railway 3835 Class No. 43924 in September 1968. The engine was taken on by the 4F Locomotive Society, and the engine now resides at the Worth Valley Railway.

However, this did not stop the engines from being scrapped as a whole, as in 1972, 4MT Mogul No. 76080 was cut up and the following year, 2884 class No. 3817 was cut up as well.

Under the terms of the contract from British Rail, Woodhams could not sell complete locomotives onwards that had been sold to them for scrap, unless payment of a levy was made. Woodham's set the price for each locomotive at its exact scrap value (each type had an exact metal content breakdown from BR, so this was simply taken and multiplied by that day's scrap rate for each metal component), plus the BR levy; with the sale price completed by the addition of Value Added Tax, initially set at 10% but raised to 15% in 1979. For most of the time that locomotives were being 'rescued' from Barry, it became accepted commercial practice by the company for preservation groups to pay a deposit for a particular locomotive, which was then protected/reserved until the group could pay for the locomotive in full and arrange transport.

Initially, locomotives were both mostly complete and able to move easily, although British Rail only allowed them to be towed by one of their own diesels, accompanied by a brake van to act as extra braking. Purchased locomotives were hence moved to a holding siding, inspected by British Rail, and then attached to a special train direct to the purchaser's site. However, after some minor incidents involving overheated axle boxes due to a lack of lubrication, BR banned movement by rail from 1976, and all locomotives were thereafter transported out by road to the M4 motorway.

The movement of locomotives to the holding sidings for inspection was also an issue, due to the deteriorating condition of the track in Woodham's yard. With the need to occasionally move locomotives in order to retrieve another which had been purchased for preservation, derailments would sometimes occur due to the poor state of the track. As Woodham's lacked the necessary equipment to re-rail the locomotives, it was easier to simply cut part of the derailed wheelset away, allowing the movement of the affected locomotive to continue. During this period, Woodham's also began scrapping locomotive tenders with the intention of then re-selling the rolling tender frames to other users. The majority of these frames were purchased by the Duport Steelworks at Briton Ferry for conversion to ingot carriers.

From the start of locomotive preservation, owners were allowed to remove components from similar types of locomotives to make up a complete kit of bits, on the condition that the donor locomotive was not reserved and that no substantial damage was incurred in removing the parts. However this policy, combined with ease of access to the extensive yards, resulted in petty theft and trophy/memorabilia collection in the early years, later escalating to mass criminal activity. Although Woodham's had allowed weekend working parties to access reserved locomotives, by 1981 illegal removal of valuable scrap had become so bad that Woodham's employed a 24-hour security guard team, and a total ban was placed on weekend working parties.

=== Barry Steam Locomotive Action Group ===
As the number of locomotives dropped below 100, the number of wagons coming for scrap also slowed, making it more likely that Woodham's would return to scrapping steam locomotives. Following a meeting of interested parties on 10 February 1979 the Barry Steam Locomotive Action Group was formed with the aim of putting potential purchasers and Woodham Brothers together, as well as funders and financial contributors. BSLAG undertook basic surveys of the remaining locomotives, listing types and conditions and acting as a media liaison point.

However, during the summer of 1980 BR were unable to offer any quantity of redundant wagons to Woodham's for scrap. Rather than lay off staff, Dai Woodham authorized the scrapping of two steam locomotives, BR Standard Class 9F No. 92085, and GWR 5101 Class No. 4156. By August, more former steel coal wagons had been delivered to the yard, making 4156 and 92085 the last locomotives to be broken up at Barry.

== Locomotives scrapped at Woodham Brothers scrapyard ==
While most steam locomotives made it out of Barry Scrapyard, some were scrapped from 1958 to 1980 and all of the diesel engines, 4 in total, that entered the yard were scrapped, despite some attempts to preserve them.

2 × GWR 1366 Class
1367, 1368

GWR 1400 Class No. 1428 was believed to have been sold to Woodham Bros., but in fact it was actually sold to J. O. Williams of Barry and cut up at their yard.

1 × GWR 2884 Class
3817 (scrapped 1973)

1 × GWR 3150 Class
3170

8 × GWR 4300 Class
5312, 5345, 5355, 5360, 5392, 5397, 6331, 6334

2 × GWR 4500 Class
4550, 4559

8 × GWR 4575 Class
4594, 5504, 5510, 5514, 5546, 5547, 5557, 5558

4 × GWR 5101 Class
4156 (scrapped 1980), 4157, 4164, 5182

3 × GWR 5400 Class
5407, 5417, 5422

4 × GWR 5600 Class
5651, 5669, 6621, 6696

12 × GWR 5700 Class
3727, 3794, 5794, 6753, 7702, 7712, 7719, 7722, 7723, 7725, 7758, 8749

1 × GWR 6100 Class
6115

1 × GWR 6400 Class
6406

1 × GWR 7200 Class
7226

17 × GWR 9400 Class
8419, 8473, 8475, 8479, 9436, 9438, 9439, 9443, 9445, 9449, 9459, 9462, 9468, 9491, 9492, 9496, 9499

7 × Hunslet Austerity 0-6-0ST
106/75040 Spyck, 108, 119, 130, 164, 178/75277 Foligno, 203

2 × LSWR Class S15
30512, 30844

2 × SR West Country and Battle of Britain classes
34045 Ottery St Mary, 34094 Mortehoe

2 × LMS Ivatt Class 2 2-6-2T
41248, 41303

1 × BR Standard Class 4 2-6-0
76080 (scrapped 1972)

1 × BR Standard Class 4 2-6-4T
80067

2 × BR Standard Class 9F
92085 (scrapped 1980), 92232

1 × British Rail Class 15
D8206

1 × British Rail Class 21 (NBL)
D6122 (scrapped 1980)

2 × British Rail Class 41 (Warship Class)
D600 Active (scrapped 1970), D601 Ark Royal (scrapped 1980)

== Final engines ==
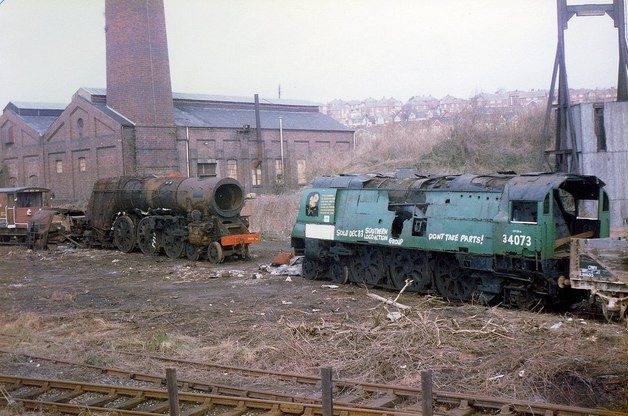
SR Merchant Navy class Shaw Savill (left) with SR Battle of Britain class 249 Squadron (right) at Woodham's Scrapyard in 1984.

Woodham Brothers continued dealing as scrap metal merchants, and continued scrapping locomotives on behalf of British Railways. These included some of the earlier types of diesels ahead of the remaining steam locomotive stock. British Rail Class 21 No. D6122 was the last of its class to survive, arriving in August 1968 and cut up by Woodhams in 1980 because no one wanted to buy it.

After Dai Woodham announced that he was going to retire, a concerted effort was made to clear the remaining hulks. One result of this was that ten locomotives, known as the Barry Ten, were taken on by the Vale of Glamorgan Council and stored in 'scrapyard' condition. All under the care of the Barry Tourist Railway, eight locomotives are still in Barry only a few hundred yards away from where they were removed, while two are under restoration at different locations around the country. GWR 4575 Class No. 5553 was the last steam engine to leave Woodham Brothers, in January 1990 for the West Somerset Railway. The last member of the Barry 10 GWR 2800 Class No. 2861 left the yard in May 2013 for the Llangollen Railway.

A total of 213 locomotives were 'rescued' from Woodham's yard and many have been restored from 1968 to 1990. By March 2019, 151 ex-Barry locomotives had been restored to working order (the 149th, 150th, and 151st, being BR Standard Class 4 2-6-4T No. 80097, GWR 6959 Class No. 6989 Wightwick Hall, and BR Standard Class 9F No. 92134 respectively), although many of these have since been withdrawn for overhaul and are out of use or awaiting further work.

In the early 1970s, Dai Woodham started building what are now called the Romilly Units at the Woodham Road site on No.2 Dock, Barry Docks, for the purpose of giving local business-people access to cheap industrial units. By 1987 he had managed to build up the site to contain 23 industrial units to rent, ranging in size from to 2,488 to 4,145 sq ft (231.1 to 385.1 m^{2}), with access to the docks, the railway and the M4 motorway. The main Woodham Brothers business continues to be these industrial units.

== In popular culture ==
On their 2008 debut album, London band Silvery released "Warship Class", a song about a childhood trip to the scrapyard in search of the remaining British Rail Class 41 (Warship Class) locomotive - D601 - 'Ark Royal'.

One of the engines rescued, and arguably the most famous one of them all, from Barry Scrapyard is GWR 4900 Class No. 5972 Olton Hall, which was rescued in 1981, restored to working order in 1998, and became a pop culture icon in the 2000s for being a part of the Harry Potter films.

Several books have been published about the area, its history, and Dai Woodham's work in railway preservation.

== Dai Woodham ==
Dai Woodham, MBE, BEM (5 September 1919 – 12 September 1994), born David Lloyd Victor Woodham, is best known as the man who saved over 200 former British Railways steam locomotives from the scrap heap.

In 1987, Woodham was awarded the MBE in recognition of a number of his business initiatives in the Barry Docks area. He had already been awarded the British Empire Medal for bravery while serving with the Royal Artillery in Italy in World War II.

In 1994, Dai Woodham was diagnosed with lung cancer and died on 12 September that year.
