= 0-6-0+0-6-0 =

Locomotive wheel arrangement

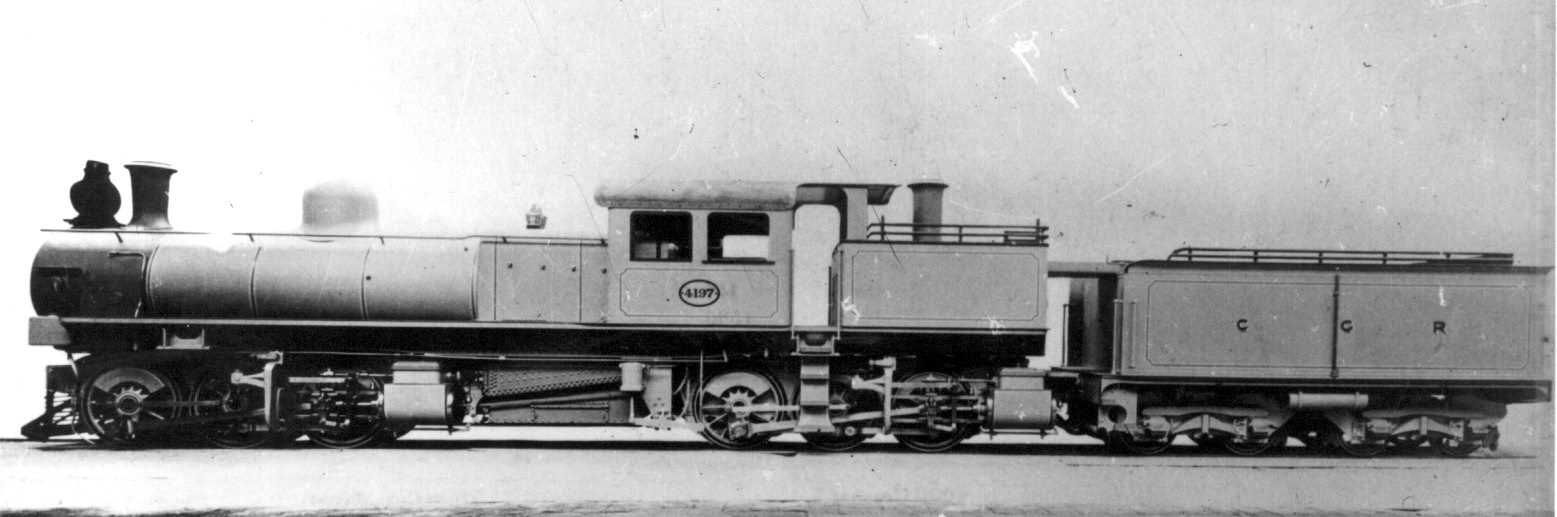
- CGR Kitson-Meyer no. 800
Equivalent classifications
- UIC class: C+C
- French class: 030+030
- Turkish class: 33+33
- Swiss class: 3/3+3/3, 6/6 from the 1920s
- Russian class: 0-3-0+0-3-0
First known tank engine version
- First use: c. 1870
- Country: United Kingdom
- Locomotive: Double Fairlie
- Designer: Robert Francis Fairlie
- Benefits: Total engine mass as adhesive weight
- Drawbacks: Driver isolated from fireman
First known tender engine version
- First use: 1903
- Country: Cape of Good Hope
- Locomotive: CGR Kitson-Meyer
- Railway: Cape Government Railways
- Designer: Kitson & Company
- Builder: Kitson & Company

Under the Whyte notation for the classification of steam locomotives, 0-6-0+0-6-0 represents the wheel arrangement of an articulated locomotive with two separate swivelling engine units, each unit with no leading wheels, six powered and coupled driving wheels on three axles and no trailing wheels. The arrangement is effectively two 0-6-0 locomotives operating back-to-back and was used on Garratt, Double Fairlie, Meyer and Kitson-Meyer articulated locomotives. A similar arrangement exists for Mallet steam locomotives on which only the front engine unit swivels, but these are referred to as 0-6-6-0.

In the United Kingdom, the Whyte notation of wheel arrangement was also used for the classification of electric and diesel-electric locomotives with side-rod coupled driving wheels.

== Overview ==
The 0-6-0+0-6-0 wheel arrangement was used on Garratt, Double Fairlie, Meyer and Kitson-Meyer locomotives, although in some cases Double Fairlies with this arrangement were also referred to as 0-6-6-0.

=== Garratt locomotives ===
The 0-6-0+0-6-0 was a rare Garratt model. Beyer, Peacock & Company, the owner of the Garratt patent, only built two of this type to 2 ft 6 in (762 mm) gauge for the Buthidaung-Maungdaw Tramway in Burma. Belgian builder Société Anonyme St Leonard of Liège constructed 31 for the Belgian Congo and two for the roadside tramways of the Belgian SNCV. Hanomag commenced the construction of a single locomotive, which was completed by Henschel for the Limburg Tramway in the Netherlands. This last was the only inside-cylinder Garratt to be built.

0-6-0+0-6-0 Garratt production list – All manufacturers
Gauge	Railway	Class	Works no.	Units	Year	Builder
750 mm	C.F. du Congo		1744	1	1913	St. Leonard, Belgium
750 mm	C.F. du Congo		1901–1912	12	1920–21	St. Leonard, Belgium
750 mm	C.F. du Congo		2001–2009	9	1924–25	St. Leonard, Belgium
750 mm	C.F. du Congo		2040–2049	10	1925–26	St. Leonard, Belgium
2 ft 6 in	Buthidaung–Maungdaw Tramway, Burma		5702–5703	2	1913	Beyer, Peacock & Company
1,000 mm	SNCV, Belgium	Type 23	2121	1	1929	St. Leonard, Belgium
1,000 mm	SNCV, Belgium	Type 23	2140	1	1930	St. Leonard, Belgium
4 ft 8 1/2 in	Limburg Tramway, the Netherlands	LTM 51	22063	1	1931	Hanomag & Henschel

=== Kitson-Meyer locomotives ===
In 1894, Kitson & Company of Leeds built a modified Meyer articulated locomotive of this wheel arrangement for the Anglo-Chilian Nitrate and Railway Company. Thereafter, the Kitson-Meyer type was widely used in South America, particularly on the Colombian and Chilean railways. The four which were built for Southern Africa were not successful.

== Use ==
=== Belgian Congo ===
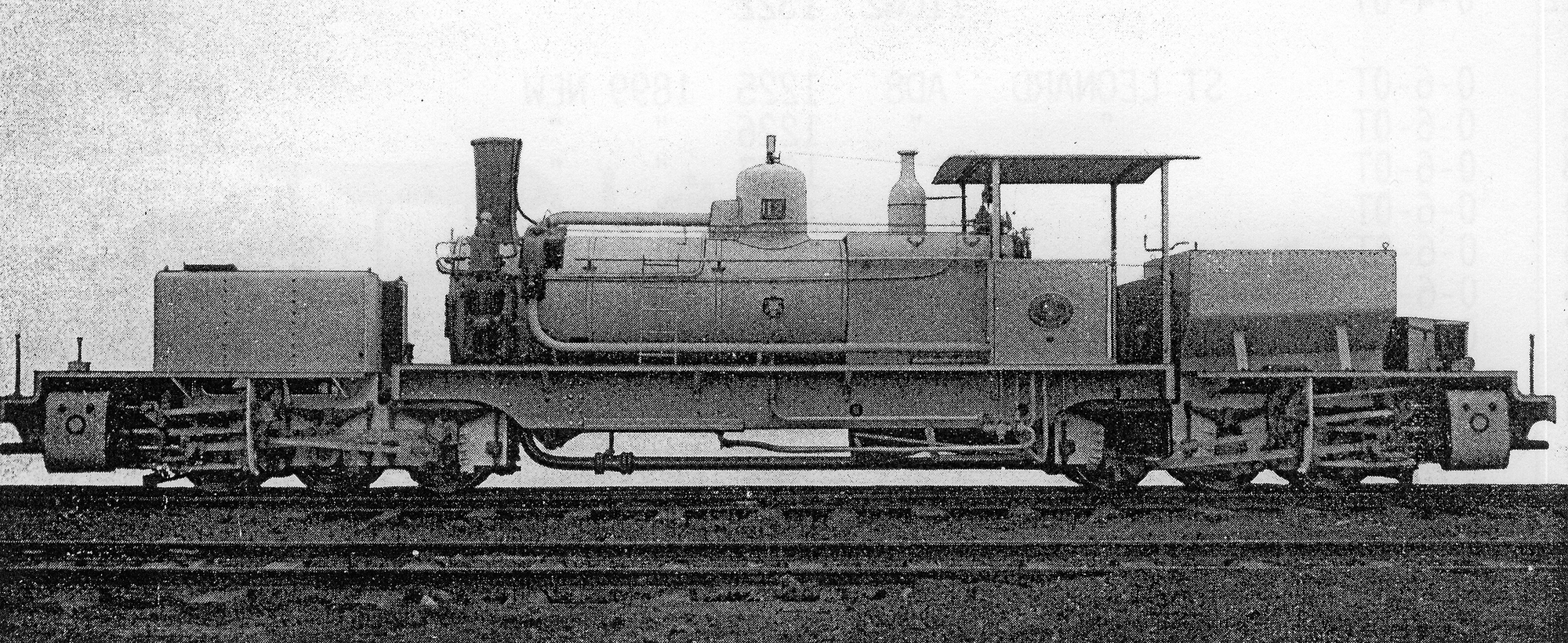
Belgian Congo type 2MB Garratt no. 112

Between 1913 and 1926, Belgian locomotive builders Société Anonyme St. Leonard of Liège constructed 31 Garratt 0-6-0+0-6-0 locomotives for the 750 mm (2 ft 5 1/2 in) gauge Compagnie du C.F. du Congo in the Belgian Congo. The locomotives were delivered in four batches, one in 1913, twelve in 1920-21, eight in 1924-25 and the last ten in 1925-26.

=== Ireland ===
CIÉ no. CC1, generally known as the Turf Burner, was a prototype 0-6-0+0-6-0 articulated steam locomotive designed by Oliver Bulleid. The locomotive shared some of the characteristics of Bulleid's previous attempt to develop a modern steam locomotive, the Southern Railway's Leader class. The locomotive had a relatively short career and was never used in front-line service.

=== South Africa ===
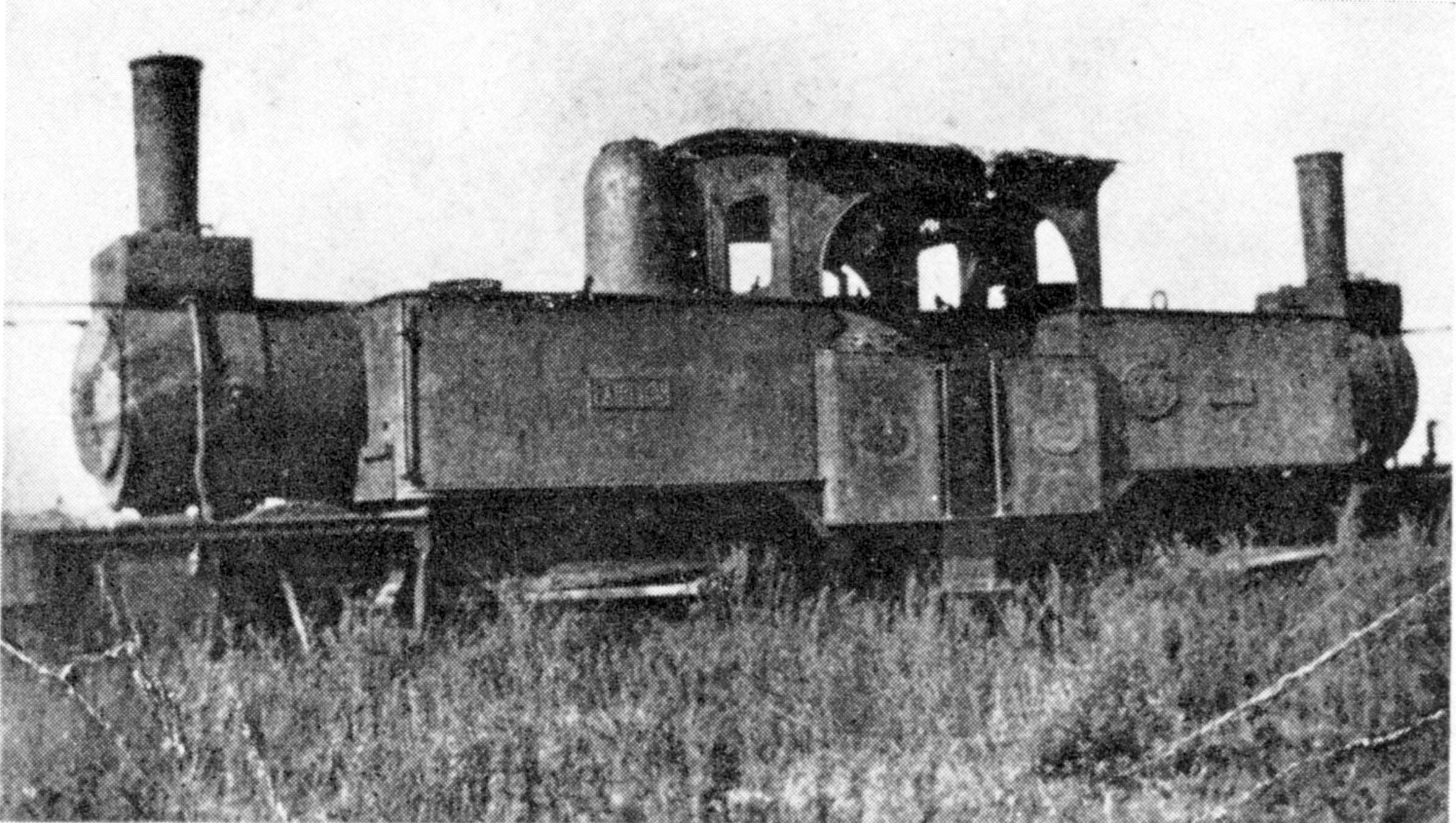
CGR Fairlie no. E34, c. 1878

In 1876, the Cape Government Railways (CGR) placed a single experimental Double Fairlie side-tank locomotive in service on the Cape Eastern system, working out of East London. Built by Avonside Engine Company, it was the first articulated locomotive to enter service in South Africa and also the first locomotive to be equipped with Walschaerts valve gear. After some shortcomings were brought to the attention of the locomotive builders, a second Double Fairlie which incorporated these improvements was delivered and placed in service in 1878.

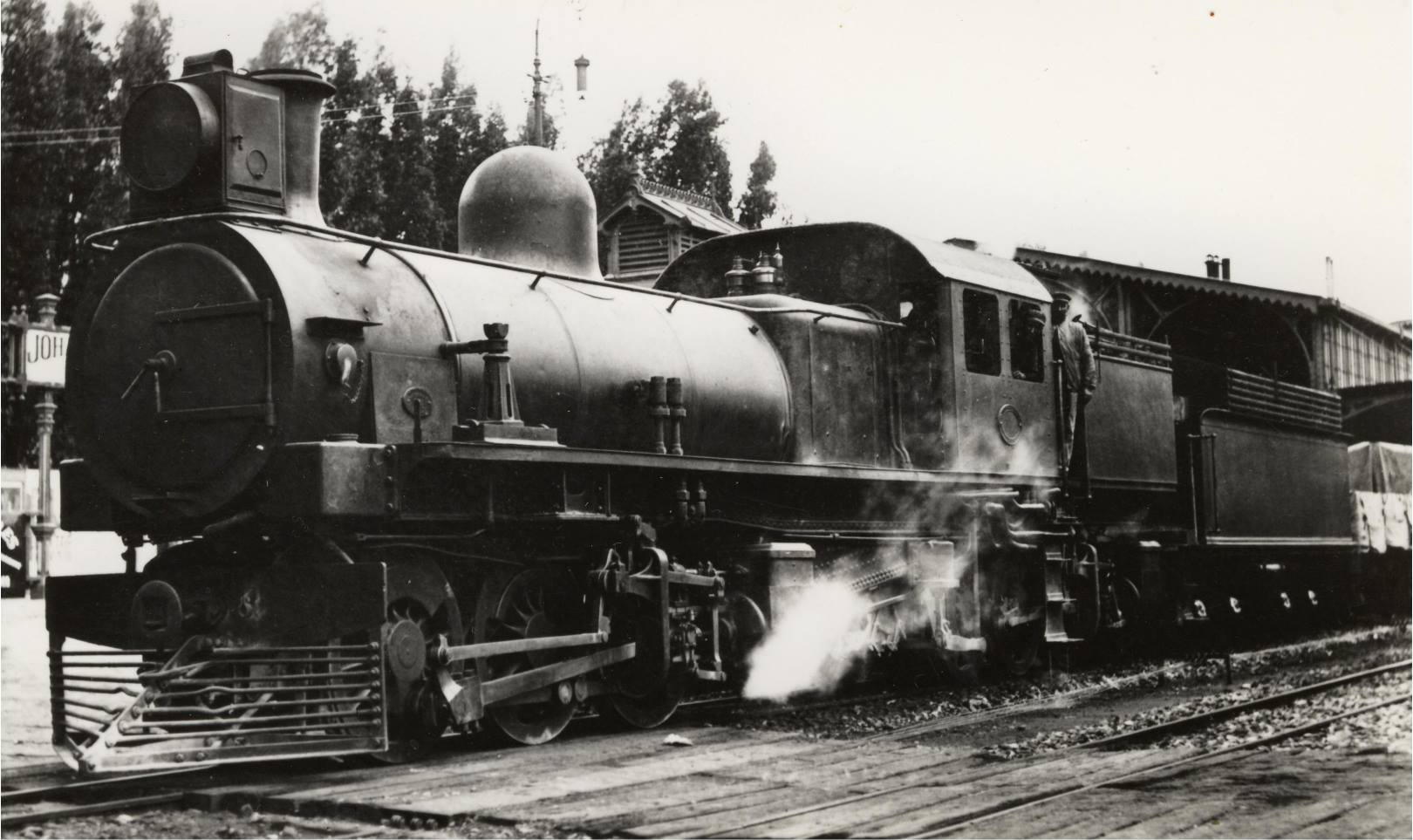
SAR Class KM no. 1600

The Kitson-Meyer type was tried out by three railways in Southern Africa. In 1903, Kitson persuaded the CGR, the Beira and Mashonaland Railway (B&MR) and the Central South African Railways (CSAR) to try their new 0-6-0+0-6-0 Kitson-Meyer articulated steam locomotive. In 1903, one locomotive was delivered to the CGR and two to the B&MR and, in 1904, one to the CSAR. Unlike a Garratt, both engine units on these locomotives were arranged with the cylinders aft of the coupled wheels. All three railways found their Kitson-Meyers to be poor steamers and, as built, none of these locomotives had a long service life. The three CGR and B&MR locomotives were all scrapped by 1912. In 1906, the CSAR modified its Class M locomotive by reducing the diameter of the cylinders to bring them within the range of the boiler’s steam generating capacity. While this reduced the locomotive’s tractive effort, it improved its performance sufficiently to allow it to survive in service longer than the other three. In 1912, it was assimilated into the South African Railways and designated Class KM.

=== United Kingdom ===
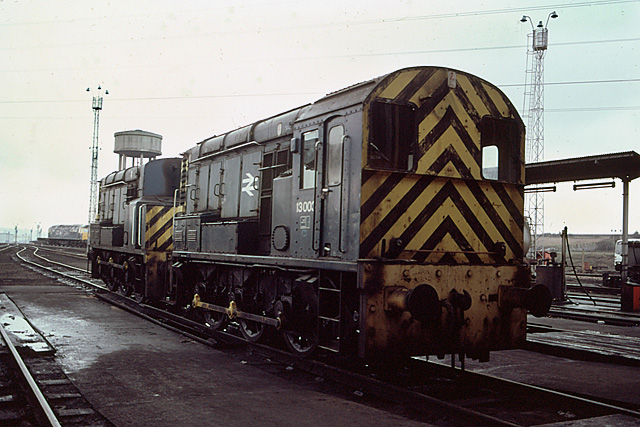
Class 13 shunter

The only steam locomotive example of this type of engine in the United Kingdom was the Leader. It was originally commissioned by the Southern Railway but it was completed by British Railways in 1949. The locomotive was a class of experimental articulated steam locomotive, produced in the United Kingdom to the design of the innovative engineer Oliver Bulleid. The Leader was effectively a Meyer locomotive since both sets of drivers were articulated. It was built in an attempt to extend the life of steam traction by eliminating many of the operational drawbacks associated with existing steam locomotives.

The 0-6-0+0-6-0 configuration was also applied to diesel-electric locomotives when British Rail created the Class 13 in 1965. This was done by permanently coupling two Class 08 0-6-0DE shunting engines as "master and slave" units, the latter with its cab removed. In North American terminology, this is referred to as a cow and calf arrangement. The modification came about because of a need to provide more powerful shunting locomotives for the Tinsley Marshalling Yard.
