= CGR Fairlie 0-6-0+0-6-0 =

Class of 2 South African 0-6-6-0 Fairlie locomotives

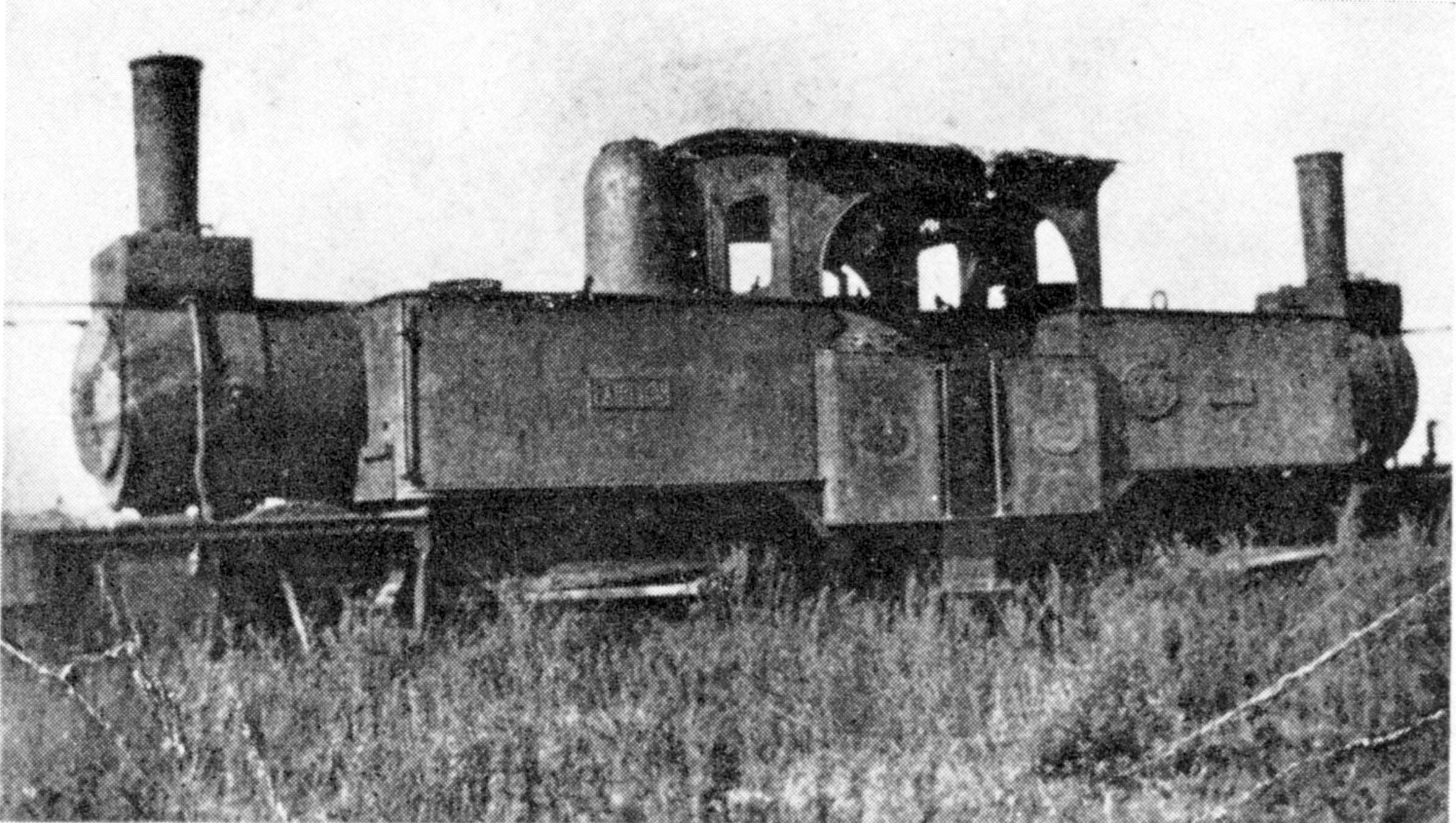
- Fairlie no. E34, the second CGR Double Fairlie of 1878
Type and origin
- Power type: Steam
- Designer: Avonside Engine Company
- Builder: Avonside Engine Company
- Serial number: 1096/1097, 1237/1238
- Build date: 1875, 1878
Specifications
- Configuration
  - Whyte: 0-6-6-0T (de jure); 0-6-0+0-6-0T (de facto)
  - UIC: C'C'n4t (de jure); C+Cn4t (de facto)
- Driver: 3rd coupled axles
- Gauge: 3 ft 6 in (1,067 mm) Cape gauge
- Coupled dia.: 1875: 39 in (991 mm); 1878: 39 1/2 in (1,003 mm)
- Wheelbase: 1875: 29 ft (8,839 mm); 1878: 25 ft 2 in (7,671 mm)
  - Engine: 7 ft 6 in (2,286 mm)
- Length
  - Over couplers: 1875: 45 ft 2 in (13,767 mm); 1878: 37 ft 6 in (11,430 mm)
- Height: 1875: 12 ft 6 in (3,810 mm); 1878: 11 ft 3 in (3,429 mm)
- Adhesive weight: 1875: 36 LT (36,580 kg)
- Loco weight: 1875: 36 LT (36,580 kg)
- Fuel type: Coal
- Fuel capacity: 1875: 2 LT 2 cwt (2.1 t); 1878: 1 LT 5 cwt (1.3 t)
- Water cap.: 840 imp gal (3,820 L)
- Firebox
  - Type: Two, round-top
  - Grate area: 14 sq ft (1.3 m^{2})
- Boiler
  - Pitch: 1875: 6 ft 2 in (1,880 mm); 1878: 5 ft 5 1/4 in (1,657 mm)
  - Diameter: 1878: 2 ft 11 1/2 in (902 mm)
  - Tube plates: 1878: 10 ft (3,048 mm)
  - Small tubes: 1878: 113: 1 1/2 in (38 mm)
- Boiler pressure: 1875: 135 psi (931 kPa); 1878: 130 psi (896 kPa)
- Heating surface
  - Firebox: 90 sq ft (8.4 m^{2})
  - Tubes: 908 sq ft (84.4 m^{2})
  - Total surface: 998 sq ft (92.7 m^{2})
- Cylinders: Four
- Cylinder size: 11 1/2 in (292 mm) bore 18 in (457 mm) stroke
- Valve gear: Walschaerts
- Couplers: Johnston link-and-pin
Performance figures
- Tractive effort: 1875: 12,350 lbf (54.9 kN) @ 75% 1878: 12,207 lbf (54.3 kN) @ 75%
Career
- Operators: Cape Government Railways
- Number in class: 2
- Numbers: E7 (later E33) & E34
- Delivered: 1876 & 1878
- First run: 1876
- Withdrawn: 1903

The Cape Government Railways Fairlie 0-6-0+0-6-0 of 1876 was a South African steam locomotive from the pre-Union era in the Cape of Good Hope.

In 1876, the Cape Government Railways placed a single experimental 0-6-0+0-6-0T Double Fairlie side-tank locomotive in service on the Cape Eastern system, working out of East London. It was the first articulated locomotive to enter service in South Africa and also the first locomotive in South Africa to be equipped with Walschaerts valve gear. After some shortcomings were brought to the attention of the locomotive builders, a second Double Fairlie which incorporated most of these improvements was delivered and placed in service in 1878.

== Manufacturer ==
To satisfy the requirement for more powerful locomotives on the Eastern System of the Cape Government Railways due to the heavy grades on the mainline out of East London, a single 0-6-0+0-6-0 Double Fairlie tank locomotive was acquired for experimental purposes in 1876. It was built by the Avonside Engine Company and supplied through the Crown Agents for the Colonies. When it was shipped from England, the locomotive was accompanied by Mr. Edmund Roberts, a specialist engine driver who had gained considerable experience on Double Fairlie locomotives in Peru.

== The Fairlie locomotive ==
The Fairlie locomotive was invented by a Scottish engineer, Robert Francis Fairlie, and patented on 12 May 1864. In general appearance, the locomotive is reminiscent of the German-built Zwillinge (twins) of 1898, which saw service on the narrow gauge lines in German South West Africa and other German territories. However, while the Zwillinge were pairs of individual locomotives which were semi-permanently coupled back-to-back, the Double Fairlie was a single "two-faced" locomotive with a double-ended boiler with smokeboxes at each end, a central steamspace over two fireboxes and a central cab, all mounted on one rigid frame. It ran on two pivoting engine units or powered bogies, similar to those of a Garratt locomotive, with the cylinders on each engine unit at the respective locomotive ends. Couplers, buffers and, where they were in use, cowcatchers were mounted on the engine unit bogies so that they could more accurately follow the curvature of the track.

== Characteristics ==
The Double Fairlie was the first articulated locomotive to enter service in South Africa and also the first to have Walschaerts valve gear, which had been invented in 1844 by Belgian locomotive foreman Egide Walschaerts. The locomotive which was acquired by the CGR had two boiler barrels connected to a common steamspace over two fireboxes which were fired from the side. The buffing and drawgear were fitted on the two engine units. The pivots were located under the two boiler saddles and were carried on centre bearings which formed part of the engine unit frames.

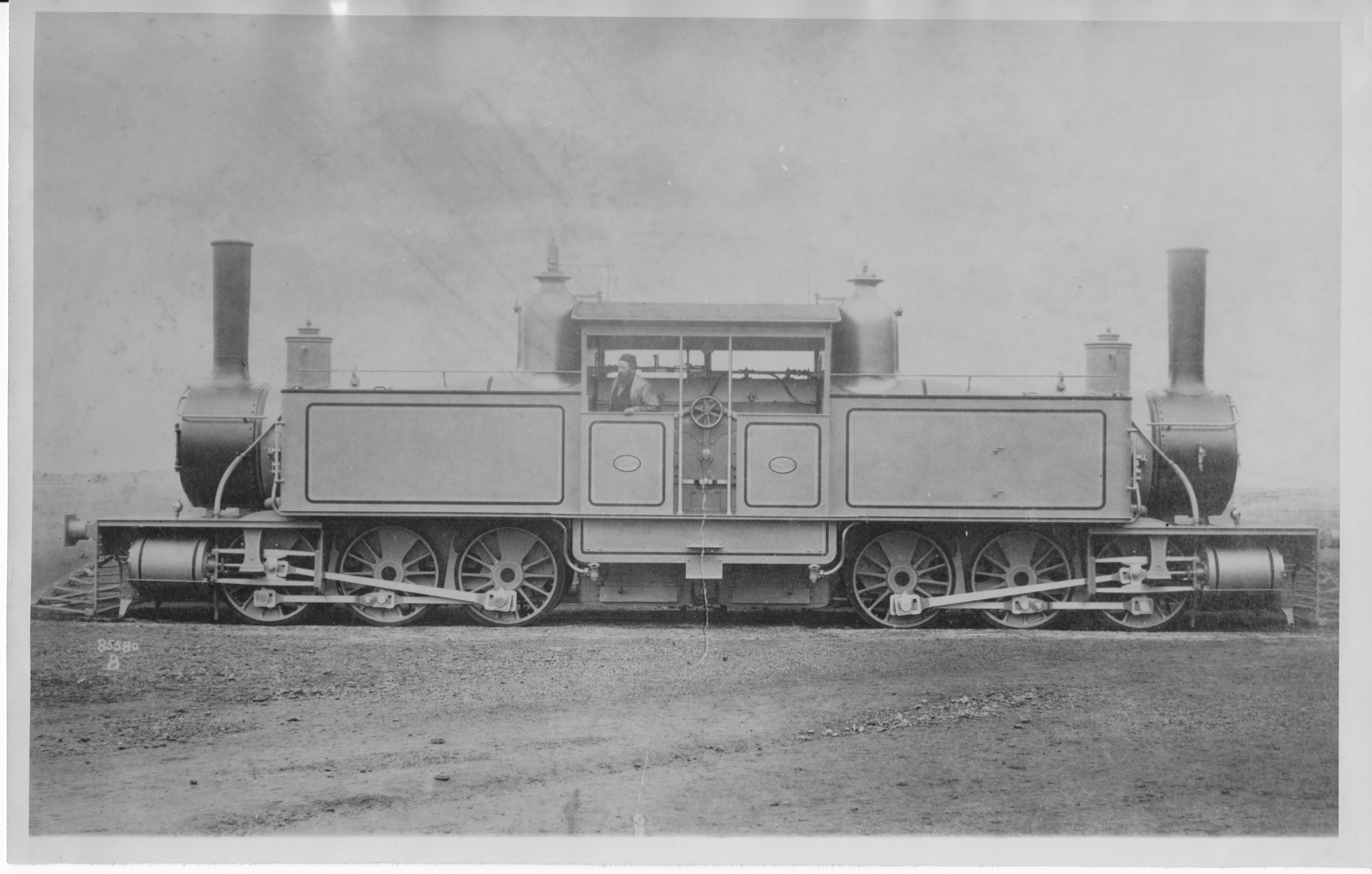
Not a CGR Double Fairlie, but showing the type's central firebox and cramped cab workspace

The steam pipes were routed across the front tube-plates into fittings which formed a prolongation of the bottom part of the smokeboxes. From there, steam passed through a swivelling and sliding joint to the cylinders. The exhaust pipes back to the smokeboxes were equipped with ball and socket joints.

Due to its uncomfortable and cramped cab, the locomotive was unpopular with the crews. The side-fired fireboxes resulted in very cramped workspace for the fireman. Since the driver worked isolated on the other side of the firebox, the men would be unable to reach each other in the event of an emergency. In addition, the fireman could only clean the grate while the engine was stopped.

== Locomotive trials ==
The locomotive was placed in service between East London and Belstone on the King William's Town line. At the same time, a pair of Stephenson's Patent permanently coupled back-to-back 0-6-0T locomotives was placed in service on the Cape Eastern system. They also worked out of East London, in comparative trials with the Double Fairlie locomotive. The trials involved running the two types over 32 miles (51.5 kilometres) of finished track, with an allowed time of 2 hours 40 minutes. This required an average speed of 12 miles per hour (19 kilometres per hour), with no time discount granted for watering stops, stops to allow steam pressure to build up or to attend to mechanical problems. The difference in altitude between the starting and terminal stations was 1,624.82 feet (495.25 metres), the sharpest curve was of 5 chains (101 metres) radius and the steepest gradient was 1 in 40 (2½%). Each type took three trial trains, running alternately.

Both types performed well on curves and while climbing inclines, but the Double Fairlie was the superior engine when descending inclines, where it gave a smoother ride. The Double Fairlie also proved to be more economical on coal and water, but it had an inadequate coal and water carrying capacity. The poor quality coal from Indwe and Molteno, with a high ash content and a tendency to clinker, had an equally negative effect on the performance of both types.

Some shortcomings of the Double Fairlie were identified during the trials. In his report to the manufacturer, Locomotive Superintendent John D. Tilney of the Cape Eastern system proposed four modifications:

- The water carrying capacity had to be increased, either by using longer side tanks or by adding a water tender to the locomotive.
- The ball and socket joints should be equipped with Roscoe lubricators.
- The sandboxes, which were mounted on the bogie frames, were ineffective and required much too complicated gearing because the engine units pivoted. It was suggested that sandboxes mounted on top of the smokeboxes would require much simpler gearing.
- There was a risk of the engine bogies swinging right around in the event of a derailment and safety chains should be fitted to prevent that from happening.

A second Double Fairlie from the same builders, also with Walschaerts valve gear, was landed at East London in 1878 and incorporated all these suggested improvements except the water capacity, which remained the same. On this locomotive, the sandboxes were located around the bases of the chimneys.

== Service ==
The first Double Fairlie locomotive was initially numbered E7 in the Eastern System's numbering sequence, but it was renumbered to E33 before 1878. The second Double Fairlie was numbered E34. While the various improvements on the second Double Fairlie locomotive proved to be effective and the engine performed well, it still offered cramped crew space and was therefore equally unpopular with enginemen, who considered it a clumsy locomotive to work.

The Double Fairlies were later taken off mainline work and employed as dock shunting engines in East London Harbour, working between the wharf and the goods sheds. They were both withdrawn and scrapped in 1903. No more of the type would be placed in service in South Africa.
