= SR Leader class =

Prototype dual cab steam locomotive

SR/BR Leader class
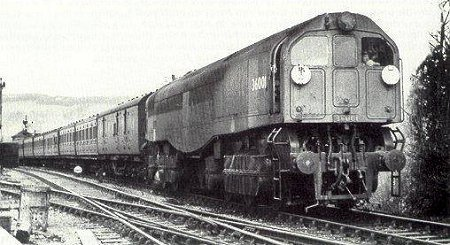
- Leader locomotive 36001 with test train at Oxted
Type and origin
- Power type: Steam
- Designer: Oliver Bulleid
- Builder: SR Brighton Works
- Build date: 1946–1949
- Total produced: 5 (only one completed)
Specifications
- Configuration
  - Whyte: 0-6-6-0T (de jure); 0-6-0+0-6-0T (de facto)
  - UIC: C'C' h6t
- Gauge: 4 ft 8 1/2 in (1,435 mm) standard gauge
- Driver dia.: 5 ft 1 in (1.549 m)
- Length: 67 ft (20.42 m)
- Loco weight: 150 long tons (168 short tons; 152 tonnes)
- Fuel type: Coal
- Fuel capacity: 4 long tons (4.5 short tons; 4.1 tonnes)
- Water cap.: 4,000 imp gal (18,000 L; 4,800 US gal)
- Firebox
  - Grate area: 25.5 sq ft (2.37 m^{2})
- Boiler pressure: 280 lbf/in^{2} (1.93 MPa)
- Cylinders: Six (Three in each bogie)
- Cylinder size: 12 1/4 in × 15 in (311 mm × 381 mm)
- Valve gear: Bulleid chain driven valve gear
Performance figures
- Tractive effort: 26,300 lbf (116.99 kN)
Career
- Operators: Southern Railway; → British Railways
- Class: SR / BR: Leader
- Power class: SR / BR: Unknown
- Nicknames: The Chinese Laundry
- Locale: Southern Region
- Withdrawn: 1951
- Disposition: All scrapped

The Leader was a class of experimental 0-6-0+0-6-0T steam locomotive, produced in the United Kingdom to the design of the innovative engineer Oliver Bulleid. The Leader was an attempt to extend the life of steam traction by eliminating many of the operational drawbacks associated with existing steam locomotives. It was intended as a replacement for the ageing fleet of M7 class tank engines still in operation on the Southern Railway (SR). Design work began in 1946 and development continued after the nationalisation of the railways in 1948, under the auspices of British Railways (BR).

The Leader project was part of Bulleid's desire to modernise the steam locomotive based on experience gained with the Southern Railway's fleet of electric stock. Bulleid considered that attitudes towards the labour-intensity of steam operation had changed during the post-war period, favouring dieselisation and electrification. In an effort to demonstrate the continued potential of steam, Bulleid pushed forward the boundaries of steam-power, hoping it could compete with diesel and electric locomotives in terms of labour-saving and ease of operation.

The design incorporated many novel features, such as the use of thermic siphons, bogies and cabs at either end of the locomotive, resulting in its unique—for a steam locomotive—modern diesel-like appearance. Several of its innovations proved to be unsuccessful however, partly accounting for the project's cancellation in the early 1950s. Five Leader locomotives were started, although only one was completed. The operational locomotive was trialled on the former Southern Railway network around Brighton. Problems with the design, indifferent reports on performance and political pressure surrounding spiralling development costs, led to all locomotives of the class being scrapped by 1951.

== Background ==
The basis of the Leader originated from a 1944 review of the Southern Railway's steam locomotive fleet, resulting in a Southern Railway design brief which called for a high-powered locomotive requiring little maintenance to replace the ageing fleet of M7 class tank engines. The brief also stipulated that the locomotive would be used on both passenger and freight trains, requiring high route availability. Bulleid proposed an initial design based on his SR Q1 class locomotive, which had proved easy to maintain in service. As the proposal progressed, Bulleid saw that certain tasks required with conventional steam locomotives could be eliminated by adopting some of the features of the contemporary Southern electric locomotives. However, one of the subsequent designs of a 0-4-4-0 wheel arrangement had an unacceptably high axle-loading of 20 long tons (20.3 tonnes; 22.4 short tons), which increased the risk of damaging the Southern Railway's track. By developing the proposal further, Bulleid settled for a 0-6-0+0-6-0T design of bogie locomotive, which spread the weight more evenly over the rails and reduced the axle-loading.

== Design ==
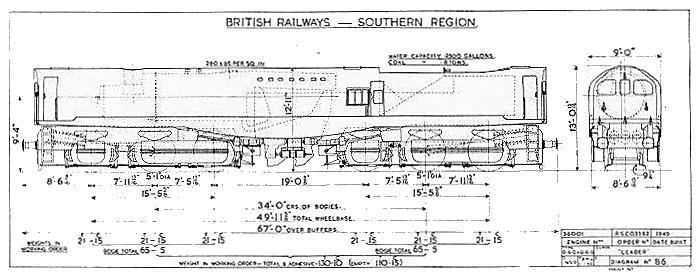
Works diagram of the Leader

A series of initial ideas were presented to the Southern Railway management by Bulleid that incorporated double-ended running, giving the locomotive driver maximum visibility in either direction without a boiler or tender obscuring his view. The need for a turntable to turn the locomotive was therefore eliminated, although the initial designs were rejected by the operating department because of problems with welding technique. The accepted design included two 0-6-0 steam bogies with weight-saving sleeve valves and chains to couple the driving axles. The boiler was offset to provide space for a communication corridor, allowing the driver to access both cabs without leaving the locomotive, an arrangement which led to later problems. The firebox, near the centre of the locomotive, was fed by the fireman from a third cab, linked to both driving cabs by the communication corridor. The entire ensemble was placed on a common frame and thus often referred to as an 0-6-6-0T, even though the actual notation is 0-6-0+0-6-0T since both engine units pivoted as on a Garratt, Double Fairlie or Meyer locomotive.

The Leader prototype was constructed at Brighton railway works, work beginning in 1946. An initial order for five locomotives was placed straight from the drawing board in 1946 and a further 31 were ordered in 1947, although, with nationalisation looming, this was merely a gesture. The latter order was cancelled after the Southern Railway was taken into public ownership, to allow trials to be carried out on the prototype.

=== Bogie and cylinder design ===
Each of the two bogies had three cylinders, with the driving wheels connected by chains enclosed in an oil-bath, based upon Bulleid's chain-driven valve gear on his Pacific locomotives. The valve gear used the unusual sleeve valve arrangement that was also tested on the ex-LB&SCR H1 class Hartland Point in parallel with the construction of the first Leader locomotive. The Leader was the first steam locomotive to use a form of sleeve valve since Cecil Paget's locomotive of 1908 and the concurrent testing of the principle on Hartland Point hints at the rushed nature of the locomotive's conception. The locomotive sat on the unusual Bulleid Firth Brown wheels, which were lighter, yet stronger, than the spoked equivalent.

The use of sleeve valves and oil baths to lubricate the moving parts of the engine units was inspired by contemporary internal combustion engine practice. This included oscillating gear that gave a 25-degree axial movement to the sleeves, allowing even lubrication of the moving parts. However, this resulted in an over-complicated mechanism that was difficult to maintain, perpetuating the seizures it was meant to eradicate. This feature was removed from both bogies of the prototype as the trials progressed. Another innovative feature of the steam bogie assembly was the ability to interchange them when faults occurred, an easy operation for maintenance staff when compared to the complexities of overhauling a regular steam locomotive's motion.

The three cylinders of each bogie were cast in mono-block format, each surrounded by two annular inlet steam chests and a single large outlet steam chest. These had the added function of keeping the cylinder heated by hot steam to maintain the temperature and pressure of steam entering the cylinders. However, these castings were difficult to machine accurately. The steam-sealing arrangements needed for this system were also complex, with each of the six cylinders and valve sleeves requiring 24 sealing rings.

=== Boiler, firebox, smokebox and casing design ===
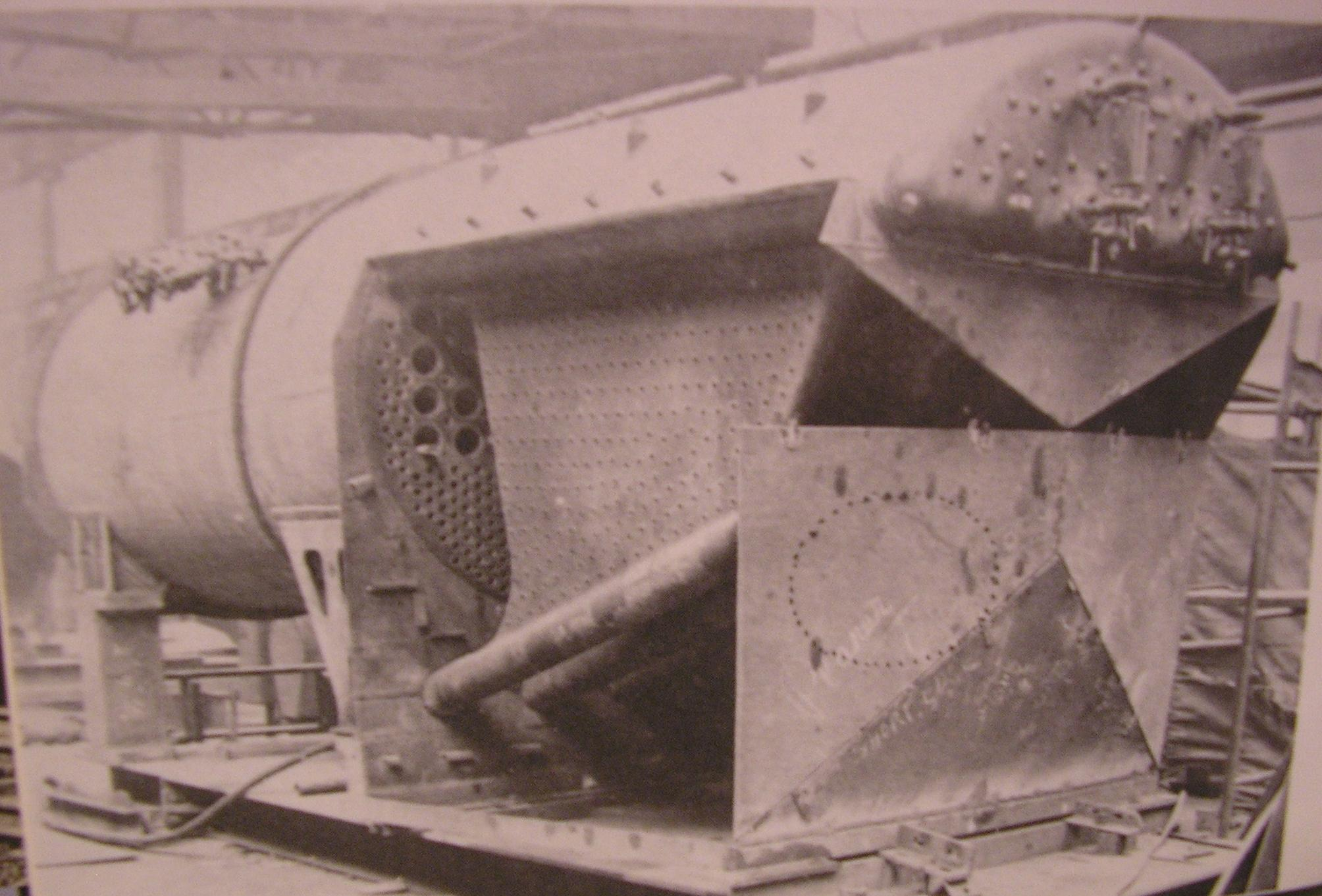
The Leader boiler and firebox, showing the offset firehole door position (dotted). Also visible are two of the four thermic siphons.

The boiler was the culmination of lessons learned with the Pacifics and was a prolific steam-raiser. All Leader boilers were constructed at Eastleigh, and proved to be the least problematic area of the entire design. The boiler pressure was set at 280 psi (1,900 kPa) and each was fitted with four thermic siphons within the firebox, both to increase the rate of evaporation and improve water circulation. These had been used previously to great effect on Bulleid's Merchant Navy and West Country and Battle of Britain class designs.

The Leader had a "dry lining" firebox. It was not surrounded on top and sides by a "jacket" of water as in normal practice, but was constructed of welded steel and used firebricks instead of water for insulation, a novel but troublesome solution. Using firebricks reduced the grate area from 47 square feet (4.4 m^{2}) to 25.5 square feet (2.37 m^{2}) and concentrated the fire in a smaller area. The firehole door was offset to the left of the boiler backhead, which created difficulties for the fireman when adding coal to the fire. The firebox was not initially equipped with a firebrick arch, although one was retro-fitted during the summer of 1950. The arch was problematic because it led to a tendency for flames to enter the cab at high outputs, a situation made worse by the narrowing of the firebox area.

The smokebox had an inherent problem in maintaining a constant vacuum. This was a result of another Bulleid labour-saving innovation, a sliding hatch controlled from the front cab, that enabled ash to be cleaned out via a chute onto the track when the locomotive was on the move. The problem lay with ash gathering around the edges of the slide, allowing air to leak into the smokebox, thereby reducing the overall efficiency of the locomotive. The fierce blast from the exhaust also meant that ash and embers were ejected into the atmosphere, creating a potential lineside fire hazard.

For ease of maintenance, the boiler, firebox and smokebox were encased in steel sheeting, which meant that the engine's shape resembled that of a modern diesel locomotive. That was a major departure from traditional steam locomotive design, allowing the engine to be cleaned using a carriage-washing plant. The locomotive was designed to carry 4 tons (4.06 tonnes) of coal and 4,000 imperial gallons (18,000 L; 4,800 US gal) of water, and the coal bunker was covered by a tarpaulin to prevent water ingress into the fireman's cab. Entry into the locomotive was by way of ladders leading up to sliding doors, although, due to the bogie design, the climb into the fireman's cab necessitated clambering over the oilbath casing.

== Construction ==
Construction of the first five Leader locomotives began at the Southern Railway's Brighton railway works in July 1947. British Railways inherited the Leader project upon nationalisation in 1948, which was far enough advanced to continue constructing the prototype, as Bulleid was still chief mechanical engineer of the newly formed Southern Region of British Railways. Although work on the other four locomotives stalled, the prototype Leader emerged from Brighton as locomotive No. 36001 in June 1949.

The other four members of the initial order made by the Southern Railway, Nos. 36002–5, were at varying stages of construction by the end of the development period. No. 36002 was almost complete, No. 36003 was without its outer casing, and Nos. 36004–5 were little more than sets of frames, although most of their major components had been constructed at Eastleigh and Brighton and were stored ready for fitting. With no prospect of further money being allocated by the Railway Executive for their completion, the unfinished locomotives were put into store at various depots around the former Southern Railway network pending a decision on their future.

== Operation ==
With a calculated tractive effort of 25,350 lbf (112.8 kN), the Leader was given the power classification of 5. This was considerably lower than the contemporary WC/BB pacifics which were rated as class 7, and this meant that the Leader had to be able to have an axle loading that would allow it to operate over secondary routes and on branch lines where the double-ended design would be of most benefit, something that was not likely with the weight inherent in the design.

On completion, No. 36001 was immediately put into service trials using empty passenger carriage stock in the south-east of England. The official trial records kept at Brighton works reported varying degrees of success and failure on the runs undertaken. However, the results of the trials as reported to British Railways headquarters at Marylebone were "conspicuous by the absence of praise" for the strengths of the Leader, namely the boiler, braking system and total adhesion provided by the two bogies. Several theories have been put forward regarding this state of affairs, the most plausible being that the more conservative members of the railway workforce at Brighton and the Railway Executive felt that the Leader was too revolutionary and were keen to maintain the status quo.

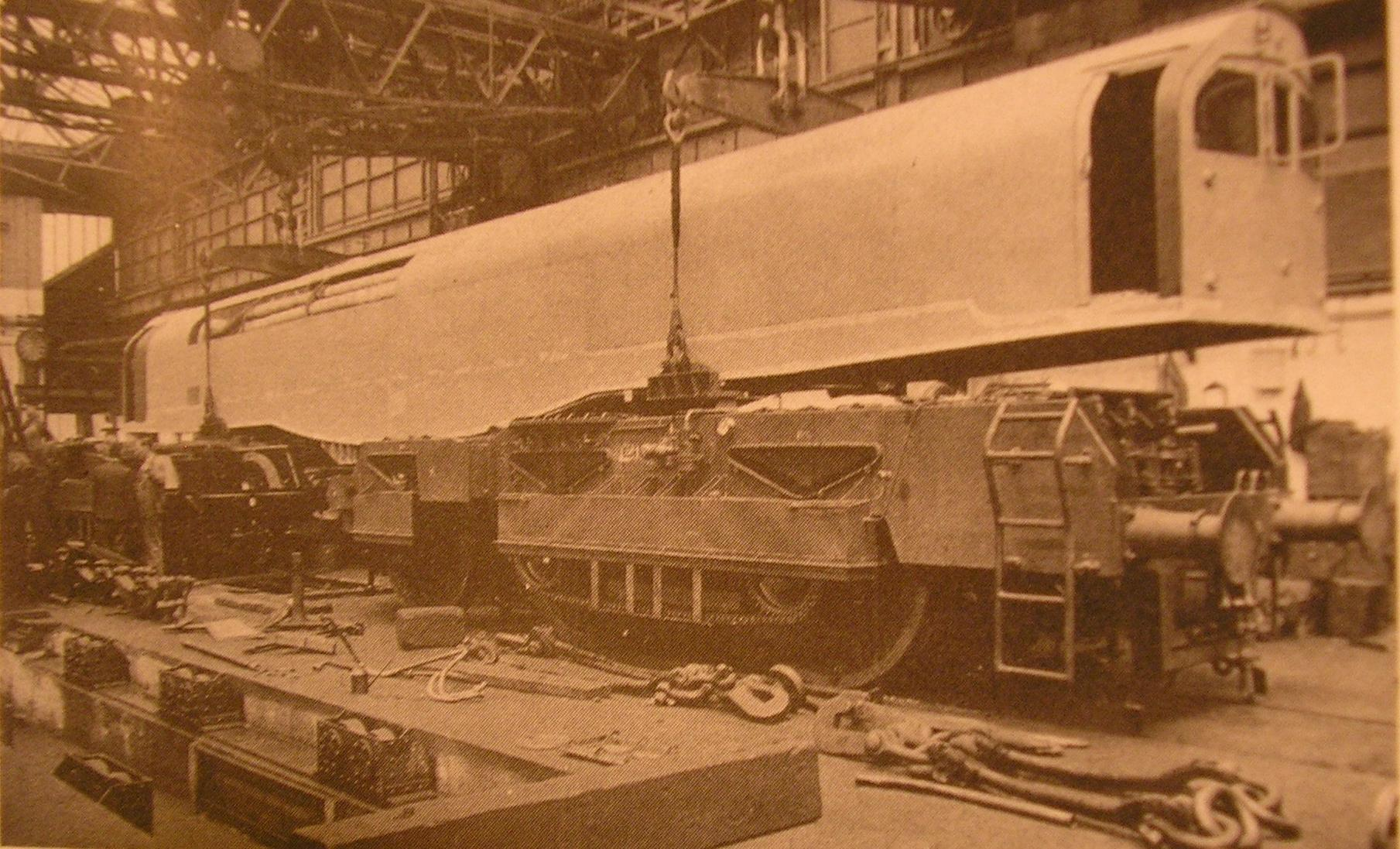
The Leader being lifted onto its power bogies at Brighton, May 1949. The casing allowed the locomotive to be put through a carriage-washing plant.

Following trials that lasted over a year, No. 36001 was shown to have several flaws, including heavy coal and water consumption, mechanical unreliability, untenable working conditions for both fireman and driver, loss of steam through the cylinder rings and uneven weight distribution on the bogies. After renewing the cylinder assembly, it was tested around Brighton and Eastleigh using an LNER Dynamometer car, where good running was experienced at high costs in fuel and effort on the part of the fireman. For a period of two weeks the Leader was tested against the performance of a U class locomotive which indicated that the brake release was too slow in service for use on tight schedules despite the brake application being noted as the best used on a Bulleid design. These trials were interrupted by breakage of the crank axles, these being replaced by axles from 36002 only for these to break in turn at approximately the same mileage as the originals.

Throughout No. 36001's trials, the firebrick lining provided a constant problem by continually collapsing into the fire. The firebricks were then replaced with cast iron substitutes that melted in the intense heat of the firebox, which were in turn replaced by thicker 9-inch (230 mm) firebricks. Some of the firemen allotted to the Leader complained about cramped conditions in the centre cab of the locomotive, a situation made worse by flames entering the cab from the firebox at high outputs. It was an enclosed space that was constantly hot and the single fireman's entrance door on the side of the locomotive was left open during travel to promote ventilation. The door into the fireman's cab also attracted criticism, as it would have been blocked in the event of the locomotive overturning on that side, preventing the fireman's escape, so that members of the railway trade union ASLEF threatened to stop their crews from operating the Leader. Measurements in the fireman's cab showed temperatures could reach 120 °F (50 °C) earning the locomotive the nickname of The Chinese Laundry due to the heat and humidity.

During work on the crank axles at Eastleigh Works the opportunity was taken to place the locomotive on the weighbridge which showed that the offset boiler and coal bunker caused the locomotive's centre of gravity to be shifted to one side. Experiments had to be undertaken to balance the locomotive by filling the linking corridor with large quantities of scrap metal, replaced in a re-design by a raised floor, covering the weighted material. These modifications resulted in the engine exceeding the total weight limit of 150 tons (151 tonnes), severely limiting the design's route availability during testing. A related problem was that despite being a tall locomotive, at 12 feet 11 inches (3.94 m), the cab ceilings were relatively low. The cab at the smokebox end of the locomotive suffered from the same excessive heat as did the fireman's cab. To circumvent this problem the locomotive was used in reverse, as the rear cab was next to the water tank and coal chute and therefore away from the hot gases circulating inside the smokebox.

Despite its problems, the locomotive displayed outstanding steaming characteristics and total traction from the two power bogies on its trial runs. When properly fired, the Leader was capable of keeping up with the schedules, even running ahead on occasions. However, operational difficulties were encountered when stopping for water - not only did the locomotive use water at a rapid rate, requiring frequent stops but the all-enclosed casing and the overall height of the locomotive meant that many of the water cranes were too low to feed directly into the water tank, thus requiring either an improvised arrangement of scoops and hoses or filling the tank from a standpipe and hose - both options greatly extended the amount of time needed to take on water. These delays tended to lose any time advantages gained when the locomotive performed well and affected the published performance figures. Despite hauling test trains over the Central Section of the former Southern Railway, the Leader prototype was never used on a revenue-earning service because of the risk of failure of the valve gear and the adverse publicity this would cause for British Railways.

== Livery and numbering ==
=== Southern Railway ===
When the project was under the auspices of the Southern Railway, No. 36001 would have been numbered CC101. Bulleid advocated a continental style of locomotive nomenclature, based upon his experiences at the French branch of Westinghouse Electric before the First World War. The Southern Railway number followed an adaptation of the UIC classification system where "C" refers to the number of driving axles – in this case three on each bogie. Since the design has six driving axles, the numbering would have been CC101–CC105 for the initial batch, the final number being the locomotive identifier.

=== British Railways ===
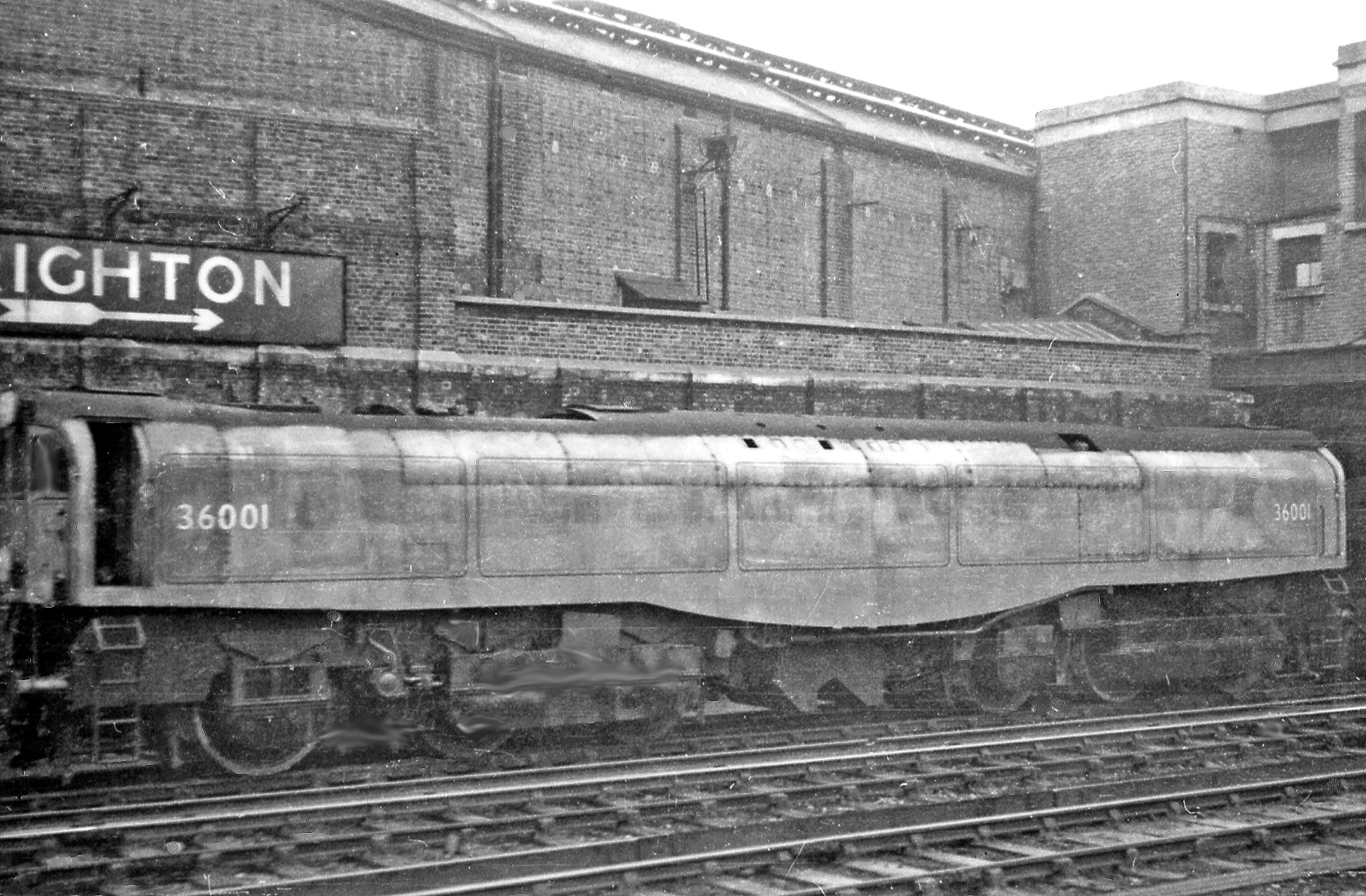
Leader 36001 outside Brighton works in 1949

Operational livery was photographic grey with red and black lining. The British Railways "Cycling Lion" crest was also used, though after the works photograph this was painted over without explanation. Numbering was the British Railways standard system, in the 36001 series. If the class had gone into full production, the locomotives would have been painted in British Railways mixed traffic/freight black livery with red, grey and cream lining. 36001 was initially painted in this livery but this preceded the official works photograph and was subsequently repainted in photographic grey.

== Operational assessment ==
Production of the Leader demonstrated the inherent unsuitability of encasing a steam boiler in an enclosed superstructure. The environment inside was highly unsuitable, the weight was prohibitive, and necessary maintenance such as boiler washouts could only be achieved by a major dismantling of the locomotive.

Despite the high expectations attached to the Leader, it was not the motive power revolution that Bulleid intended it to be. No part of the Leader design was perpetuated on the British Railways Standard class locomotives by Robert Riddles, nor did it find favour internationally, with the Garratt locomotives providing a similar function for less maintenance. The whole concept was quietly dropped in 1951 after Bulleid left British Railways to become Chief Mechanical Engineer of Córas Iompair Éireann (where he produced CIÉ No. CC1, a peat-burning locomotive to a similar design) and all five were scrapped. The culmination of the project was a £178,865 5s 0d (equivalent to £7,741,108 as of 2023) bill for the taxpayer though, when the press reported the story as late as 1953, it was claimed that £500,000 (equivalent to £21,639,498 as of 2023) was wasted on the project. R. G. Jarvis, who was placed in charge of the project after Bulleid's departure, insisted that the locomotive required an entire re-design to solve the problems of the original concept.

After the problems during the trials in 1950, in November of that year 36001 and the four other Leader locomotives then in various stages of assembly were all cut up for scrap. Only the numberplates of No. 36001 and No. 36002 are known to exist. The numberplate for No. 36001 is in the National Railway Museum; a locomotive builder's plate intended for the locomotive, but never fitted in service, was auctioned for £1050 in 2008. The Leader was a bold attempt at pushing back the boundaries of contemporary steam locomotive design and, if successful, might have prolonged the life of steam on British Railways.
