= CIÉ No. CC1 =

Prototype steam locomotive

CIÉ CC1 Turf Burner
Type and origin
- Power type: Steam
- Designer: Oliver Bulleid
- Builder: CIÉ Inchicore Works
- Build date: 1957
- Total produced: 1
Specifications
- Configuration
  - Whyte: 0-6-6-0T
  - UIC: C′C′ h4t
- Gauge: 1,600 mm (5 ft 3 in)
- Driver dia.: 3 ft 7 in (1.092 m)
- Length: 60 ft 0 in (18.29 m)
- Width: 9 ft 6 in (2.90 m)
- Height: 13 ft 1 in (3.99 m)
- Axle load: 19 long tons 14 cwt (44,100 lb or 20 t)
- Loco weight: 118 long tons 0 cwt (264,300 lb or 119.9 t)
- Fuel type: Turf (peat)
- Fuel capacity: 12 long tons 0 cwt (26,900 lb or 12.2 t)
- Water cap.: 2,700 imp gal (12,000 L; 3,200 US gal)
- Firebox
  - Grate area: 22.75 sq ft (2.114 m^{2})
- Boiler pressure: 250 psi (1,720 kPa)
- Cylinders: Four (Two per bogie)
- Cylinder size: 12 in × 14 in (305 mm × 356 mm)
- Loco brake: Air
- Train brakes: Vacuum
Performance figures
- Maximum speed: 70 mph (113 km/h)
- Tractive effort: 20,000 pounds-force (89 kN)
Career
- Operators: Córas Iompair Éireann
- Numbers: CC1
- Nicknames: Turf Burner
- Locale: Ireland
- First run: 1957
- Last run: 1958
- Withdrawn: 1963
- Disposition: Scrapped, 1965

Córas Iompair Éireann No. CC1, generally known as the Turf Burner, was a prototype 0-6-6-0 articulated steam locomotive designed by Oliver Bulleid to burn turf (an Irish term for peat used as fuel) and built at CIÉ's Inchicore Works in Dublin. CC1 shared some, but not all, of the characteristics of Bulleid's previous attempt to develop a modern steam locomotive, the Leader. Like the one completed Leader, CC1 had a relatively short career and was never used in front-line service. It was the last steam locomotive to be constructed for an Irish railway.

== Background ==
=== Turf as locomotive fuel ===
Experiments with turf as a fuel for steam locomotives began in the early days of Irish railways. The first use of turf in a locomotive was on the Midland Great Western Railway in 1848. Further experiments were conducted over the years on the Waterford and Limerick, Great Southern and Western, Belfast and Northern Counties and Listowel and Ballybunion Railways, but there is no evidence of routine use. During the Emergency (World War II), shortages of imported coal led to the use of turf as one of several substitutes (others included loose coal dust and briquettes of anthracite dust bonded with pitch).

The first locomotives designed specifically to burn turf were three 0-4-0 well tank engines, built by Andrew Barclay of Kilmarnock, Scotland, and introduced by the nationalised turf producer Bord na Móna on its 3 ft (914 mm) gauge lines at Clonsast, near Portarlington, in 1949. They were withdrawn after three years' service, but all survive in some form: two preserved on, respectively, The Giant's Causeway and Bushmills Railway and the Irish Steam Preservation Society's railway and one heavily rebuilt into the Talyllyn Railway's 0-4-2T locomotive 7, Tom Rolt.

=== The postwar years: turf development and fuel experiments ===
From the 1930s onwards (originally through the Turf Development Board), the Irish government aimed to encourage turf production for reasons of rural development and energy security. In the aftermath of World War II, turf production was greatly expanded and the Electricity Supply Board began to develop turf-fired power stations; Bord na Móna succeeded the Turf Development Board in 1946. The winter of 1946–1947 saw severe coal shortages that led to the cancellation of most CIÉ rail services and further strengthened the case for an alternative fuel. CIÉ had carried out limited experiments with oil firing in 1945 and later converted a total of 93 steam locomotives to this fuel in 1946–47; however, the oil-burning scheme was abandoned in late 1947 as coal supplies began to return to normal, although a further experiment was made in 1954. It was against this backdrop that Bulleid joined CIÉ.

=== Bulleid comes to Ireland ===
In July 1948, former Great Western Railway general manager James Milne was appointed by the Irish government to review rail, road and canal transport in the country. Milne was supported by three assistants and three further technical assessors; Oliver Bulleid, then still chief mechanical engineer of British Railways Southern Region, was amongst the latter. The resulting Milne Report, submitted in December, advised the rationalisation of the steam locomotive fleet and the construction of new, standardised steam locomotives; however, it saw diesel traction's advantages as unproven. Bulleid retired from BR in September 1949 and became consulting mechanical engineer to CIÉ, succeeding to the post of Chief Mechanical Engineer a year later. He indicated his interest in turf-burning locomotives at an early stage, and laboratory experiments and tests in stationary boilers were underway by 1950. Preparations for the conversion of an existing locomotive to burn turf began in early 1951.

== Experiments with converted locomotive ==
The former Great Southern and Western Railway Class K3 2-6-0 locomotive number 356, built by the North British Locomotive Company as an 0-6-0 in 1903 and subsequently rebuilt by the GS&WR, was converted into a testbed for the turf-burning project. Modifications to 356 included a new firebox, fitted with tuyeres, and two Crosti-type feedwater heaters, one on either side of the main boiler, which used heat from exhaust gases to heat boiler feedwater. Preheating coils were also located in the tender's water tank, and the chimney was positioned at the rear of the tender. Turf was fed to the firebox via an auger; there was no means of regulating this process. Steaming trials with the modified 356 began in 1952. Difficulties with steaming led to the addition of a forced-draught fan, which was mounted on a wagon behind the tender and driven by a Leyland bus engine. The results of trials with 356 were mixed, and the locomotive was broken up in 1957; however, some of the concepts were incorporated into CC1.

== Design of CC1 ==
=== Discarded concepts ===
Bulleid rejected a number of variants before deciding on CC1's configuration. In addition to the 0-6-6-0 wheel arrangement ultimately chosen, he considered an 0-4-4-0 and a six-axle locomotive with only four axles driven. Before deciding to mount the steam engines on the bogies (as he had done in the Leader), he investigated the idea of engines mounted on the main frame and driving the bogies via shafts or gears (see Geared steam locomotive). Bulleid intended to make use of sleeve valves, as he had done in the Leader, and sought advice from Sir Harry Ricardo on the matter. However, he ultimately reverted to piston valves in the face of political pressure to make progress on the locomotive's development.

=== The final design ===
CC1 was a double-ended tank locomotive on two three-axle bogies, all wheels on each bogie being driven by a two-cylinder steam engine via a chain transmission. A double-ended boiler, comprising two square barrels and a single central firebox, was located in the central part of the locomotive. Turf and water were supplied from bunkers and tanks at either end. As in 356, augers were used to feed turf from the bunkers to the firebox, where two mechanical stokers were fitted. Between the bunkers and the boiler were the cabs and a smokebox and superheater for each boiler barrel. Hot gases were ducted from the smokeboxes to feedwater heaters and then to induction fans (driven by steam turbines) before exhausting from the locomotive's two chimneys. Spark arrestors were fitted at a later stage, along with a system for passing captured sparks back to the firebox. The overall layout resembled a Double Fairlie, although CC1 differed in having only one boiler and in having its buffers and drawgear mounted on the locomotive frame, rather than on the bogies.

=== CC1 and Leader designs compared ===
Several commentators have compared CC1 to Leader. Both designs were 0-6-6-0 tank locomotives with twin cabs and both had bogie-mounted steam engines driving the wheels via chains. However, CC1 was shorter and lighter than Leader, with two cylinders (themselves slightly smaller than Leader's) per bogie, rather than three, as well as smaller driving wheels. CC1's cabs were inset from the locomotive's ends (like those of, for example, the Pennsylvania Railroad's GG1 electric locomotive), whereas Leader's were located at the ends. CC1's double-ended boiler design contrasted with Leader's single-ended boiler; the boiler was also located in the middle of the locomotive, rather than towards one end, and was not offset from the locomotive's longitudinal centre line. The fuel bunkers and water tanks were also located at one end of the locomotive in Leader but both ends in CC1. CC1's lack of sleeve valves has already been mentioned. Finally, there were changes associated with the difference in fuel; the coal-fired Leader did not require the augers, mechanical stokers and induced-draught fans fitted to CC1.

== Testing ==
CC1 was first steamed in July 1957 and began main line trials the following month. Between August and October, the locomotive ran 2,147 miles (3,444 km). Most test runs were on the Dublin-Cork main line; two runs went to Cork and back, and others terminated at points between Hazelhatch and Portarlington. One run (operating light engine) was made to Mullingar and back, on the former Midland Great Western main line, but ride quality suffered on this route's sharp curves. A review of the trial results by Bulleid's assistant, John Click (a secondee from BR) showed that the generally performed well, with excellent riding (apart from the above exception) at speeds up to 70 mph (113 km/h); much of the test running was at high speeds. Turf consumption and noise levels were also very favourable.

=== Problems experienced ===
Like Leader, CC1 experienced a variety of problems during testing, some of which were addressed through modifications; for example, the installation of the spark arrestors mentioned above cured problems of spark emission. The locomotive's water consumption was high and the boiler's double-ended nature and sectional construction gave rise to various difficulties, as did the locomotive's twin regulators and its reversing gear. When operating with CC1's number 2 end leading, the driver and fireman were on the same side of the locomotive, posing problems in signal sighting; steam and smoke exacerbated the problem until smoke deflectors were fitted. Issues also arose with leakage of the drive chains' oil baths, a problem common to multiple Bulleid designs.

== Proposed successors ==
It was intended that CC1 would be the forerunner of a class of fifty eight locomotives, which would normally burn oil but would be capable of using turf in emergencies. On the basis of the trial results, John Click developed a design for a single-ended version of CC1, which would address space, weight and other problems experienced with the CC1 configuration. This locomotive would have had a single-ended boiler barrel (still of square section) with a cab located at the firebox end of the boiler; water tanks would be located at either end of the locomotive and a bunker at the cab end. Click believed that the design had export potential, but the entire project ended shortly thereafter.

== Post-testing use, withdrawal and disposal ==
After the end of the testing programme, CC1 reportedly made a few trips hauling transfer freight trains in the Dublin area. Bulleid himself is reported to have driven the locomotive on trips between Inchicore and Clondalkin for visiting dignitaries during a meeting of the Institution of Locomotive Engineers in May 1958. Bulleid's retirement on the 30th of that month ended CC1's career. In December 1958, the CIÉ board formally abandoned the CC1 project. The locomotive was officially withdrawn in 1963, following the delivery of the CIE 141 Class diesels from EMD. Several sources describe CC1 as having been broken up in 1965. However, the boiler was "retained for possible stationary use" and the chassis appears to have survived into the 1970s, having been described as "still surviving at Inchicore" in 1975 and photographed at least once in this period. Later, a retired CIÉ executive commented that the scrapping was "a pity" because "such an oddity deserved preservation."
