= South African Class KM 0-6-0+0-6-0 =

1904 articulated steam locomotive

CSAR Class M 0-6-0+0-6-0 South African Class KM 0-6-0+0-6-0
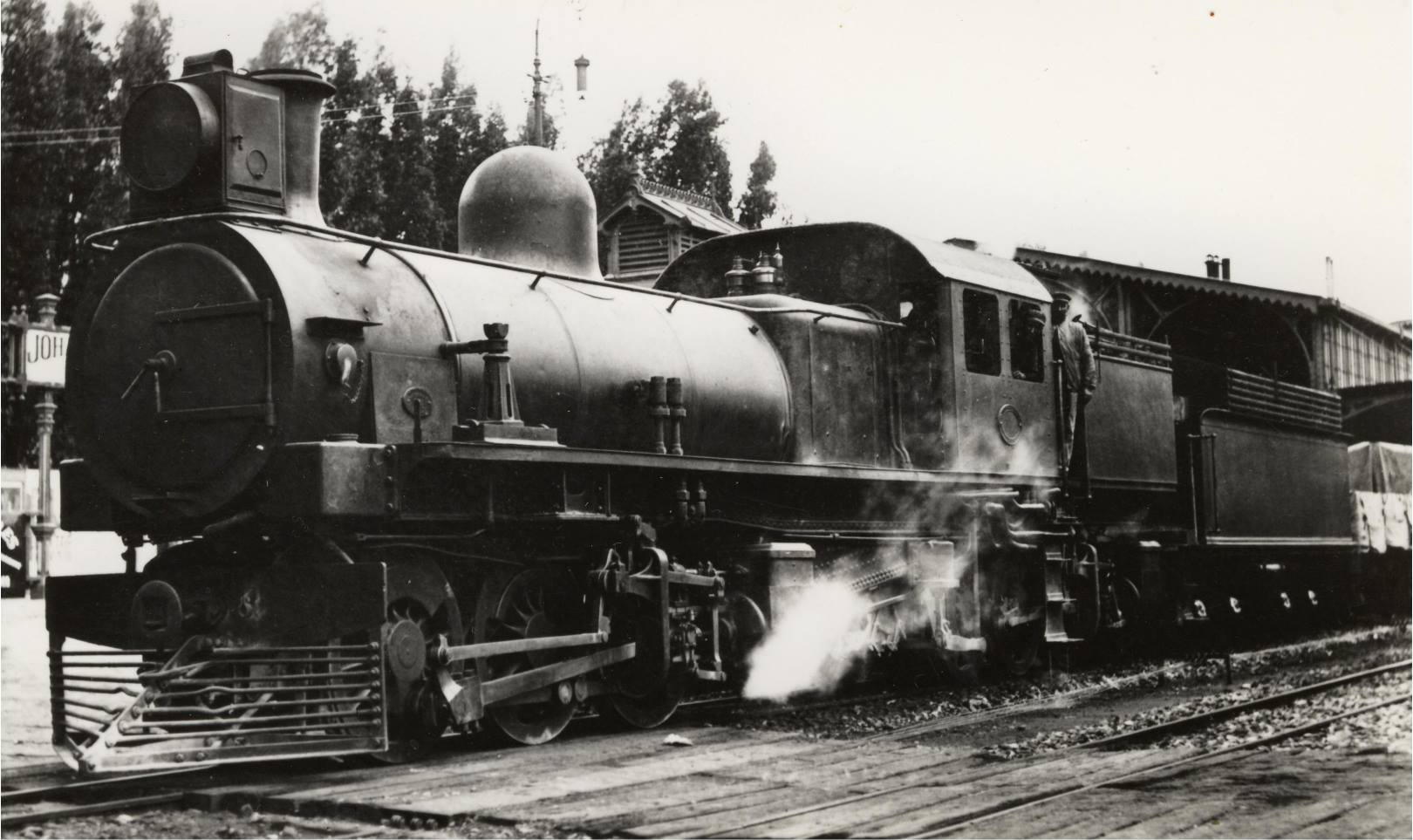
- SAR Class KM no. 1600, ex CSAR Class M no. 1000, c. 1915 in Johannesburg station
Type and origin
- Power type: Steam
- Designer: Kitson and Company
- Builder: Kitson and Company
- Serial number: 4262
- Model: CSAR Class M
- Build date: 1904
- Total produced: 4
Specifications
- Configuration
  - Whyte: 0-6-0+0-6-0T
  - UIC: C+Cn4t
- Driver: 1st & 4th coupled axles
- Gauge: 3 ft 6 in (1,067 mm) Cape gauge
- Coupled dia.: 48 in (1,219 mm)
- Tender wheels: 33 1/2 in (851 mm)
- Wheelbase: 58 ft 4 1/2 in (17,793 mm)
  - Engine: 34 ft (10,363 mm)
  - Coupled: 8 ft 6 in (2,591 mm) each
  - Tender: 14 ft 7 in (4,445 mm)
  - Tender bogie: 4 ft 7 in (1,397 mm)
- Pivot centres: 25 ft 6 in (7,772 mm)
- Length
  - Over couplers: 66 ft 5 1/4 in (20,250 mm)
- Height: 12 ft 10 in (3,912 mm)
- Axle load: 14 LT 18 cwt (15,140 kg)
  - 1st coupled: 13 LT 1 cwt (13,260 kg)
  - 2nd coupled: 13 LT 3 cwt (13,360 kg)
  - 3rd coupled: 12 LT 11 cwt (12,750 kg)
  - 4th coupled: 14 LT 16 cwt (15,040 kg)
  - 5th coupled: 14 LT 14 cwt (14,940 kg)
  - 6th coupled: 14 LT 18 cwt (15,140 kg)
  - Tender bogie: Bogie 1: 18 LT 9 cwt (18,750 kg); Bogie 2: 19 LT 10 cwt (19,810 kg)
  - Tender axle: 9 LT 15 cwt (9,906 kg)
- Adhesive weight: 83 LT 3 cwt (84,480 kg)
- Loco weight: 83 LT 3 cwt (84,480 kg)
- Tender weight: 37 LT 19 cwt (38,560 kg)
- Total weight: 121 LT 2 cwt (123,000 kg)
- Tender type: 2-axle bogies
- Fuel type: Coal
- Fuel capacity: 7 LT (7.1 t)
- Water cap.: 3,000 imp gal (14,000 L)
- Tender cap.: 6 LT (6.1 t)
- Firebox
  - Type: Belpaire
  - Grate area: 34 sq ft (3.2 m^{2})
- Boiler
  - Pitch: 7 ft 2 in (2,184 mm)
  - Diameter: 5 ft (1,524 mm)
  - Tube plates: 13 ft 9 5/8 in (4,207 mm)
  - Small tubes: 239: 2 in (51 mm)
- Boiler pressure: 180 psi (1,241 kPa)
- Safety valve: Ramsbottom
- Heating surface
  - Firebox: 136 sq ft (12.6 m^{2})
  - Tubes: 1,727 sq ft (160.4 m^{2})
  - Total surface: 1,863 sq ft (173.1 m^{2})
- Cylinders: Four
- Cylinder size: 16 in (406 mm) bore 24 in (610 mm) stroke
- Valve gear: Walschaerts
- Couplers: Johnston link-and-pin
Performance figures
- Tractive effort: 34,560 lbf (153.7 kN) @ 75%
Career
- Operators: Central South African Railways; South African Railways; Transvaal Collieries
- Class: CSAR Class M, SAR Class KM
- Number in class: 1
- Numbers: CSAR 1000, SAR 1600
- Delivered: 1904
- First run: 1904
- Withdrawn: 1918

The South African Railways Class KM 0-6-0+0-6-0 of 1904 was an articulated steam locomotive from the pre-Union era in Transvaal Colony.

In 1904, the Central South African Railways placed a single 0-6-0+0-6-0T Kitson-Meyer type articulated steam locomotive in service and designated it Class M. In 1912, when the locomotive was assimilated into the South African Railways, it was renumbered and designated Class KM.

== Manufacturer ==
In 1903, the English locomotive builders Kitson and Company persuaded the Cape Government Railways (CGR), the Beira and Mashonaland Railway (B&MR) and the Central South African Railways (CSAR) to try their new 0-6-0+0-6-0T Kitson-Meyer type articulated steam locomotive. One was delivered to the CGR and two to the B&MR in 1903. One locomotive was also delivered to the CSAR in 1904, numbered 1000 and designated Class M.

== Characteristics ==
The Kitson-Meyer design consisted of two sets of coupled wheels under the frame, with both power units free to swivel in relation to the frame. Compared to the usual practice on steam locomotives, the sets of coupled wheels were both mounted back to front, with the wheels to the front of the cylinders. The cylinders of the rear power unit discharged their exhaust steam up a chimney mounted in the coal bunker to the rear of the cab, while the front cylinders discharged in the usual manner up a chimney mounted on the smokebox in front of the boiler.

=== Meyer locomotive ===
The Kitson-Meyer was a development of the Meyer locomotive. On a Meyer locomotive, the two engine units were mounted close together, and usually with the cylinder ends of the engine units facing each other at the centre of the locomotive. One disadvantage of this design was that the rear power unit was directly beneath the firebox, thereby limiting the firebox in size.

=== Kitson-Meyer locomotive ===
On the Kitson-Meyer locomotive, the rear engine unit was located further back, which allowed the firebox to be between the two engine units, thereby making a much larger firebox possible. The same feature would also be a characteristic of the Garratt locomotive, of which the first appearance in the world was still five years in the future at the time. This also increased the length of the locomotive, making it possible to utilise the additional length behind the cab for a coal and water bunker. The auxiliary chimney at the rear avoided the need to have an exhaust steam pipe running the length of the locomotive to the smokebox at the front end.

The Kitson-Meyer locomotives which were delivered to the three Southern African railways had Walschaerts valve gear. They carried no water, but had a coal bunker to the rear of the cab with a capacity of 7 long tons (7.1 tonnes). All its water was carried in the tender, which had a capacity of 3,000 imperial gallons (14,000 litres) as well as an additional coal capacity of 6 long tons (6.1 tonnes).

== Performance and modifications ==
All three railways found their Kitson-Meyers to be poor steamers and, as built, none of these locomotives had a long service life.

While the Kitson-Meyer could handle a one-third heavier load than a CSAR Class 8-L1 by hauling loads of 1,000 long tons (1,016.0 tonnes) up 1 in 100 (1%) grades, it was heavy on coal and repairs. It was found that the boiler could not supply sufficient steam for the four cylinders on longer runs. Part of the problem could probably be ascribed to the fact that the exhaust steam from the rear power unit contributed nothing to the smokebox draught, the same phenomenon which would necessitate the installation of induced draught equipment on South Africa's Class 25 condensing locomotives half a century later.

Under the guidance of L.S. Smart, who had succeeded P.A. Hyde as Chief Locomotive Superintendent of the CSAR in 1905, the CSAR carried out certain modifications to their Kitson-Meyer locomotive in 1906. Since it was impractical to increase the size of the boiler to suit the engines, the diameter of the cylinders was reduced to bring them within the range of the boiler's steam generating capacity. While this reduced the locomotive's tractive force, it did result in making the Kitson-Meyer a reasonably good performer.

== Service ==
The modified CSAR Kitson-Meyer locomotive survived longer than its CGR and B&MR sister engines, which were all scrapped in 1912. The design was not repeated on the CSAR and was eventually superseded by the introduction of the first Mallet articulated locomotive in 1910.

When the Union of South Africa was established on 31 May 1910, the three Colonial government railways (CGR, Natal Government Railways and CSAR) were united under a single administration to control and administer the railways, ports and harbours of the Union. Although the South African Railways and Harbours came into existence in 1910, the actual classification and renumbering of all the rolling stock of the three constituent railways were only implemented with effect from 1 January 1912.

In 1912, the CSAR Kitson-Meyer locomotive was renumbered 1600 and designated Class KM on the SAR. It remained in SAR service until 1918 and was used on the Reef for its entire service life, stationed at Germiston. Upon withdrawal from service, it was sold to the Transvaal Collieries.

== Illustration ==
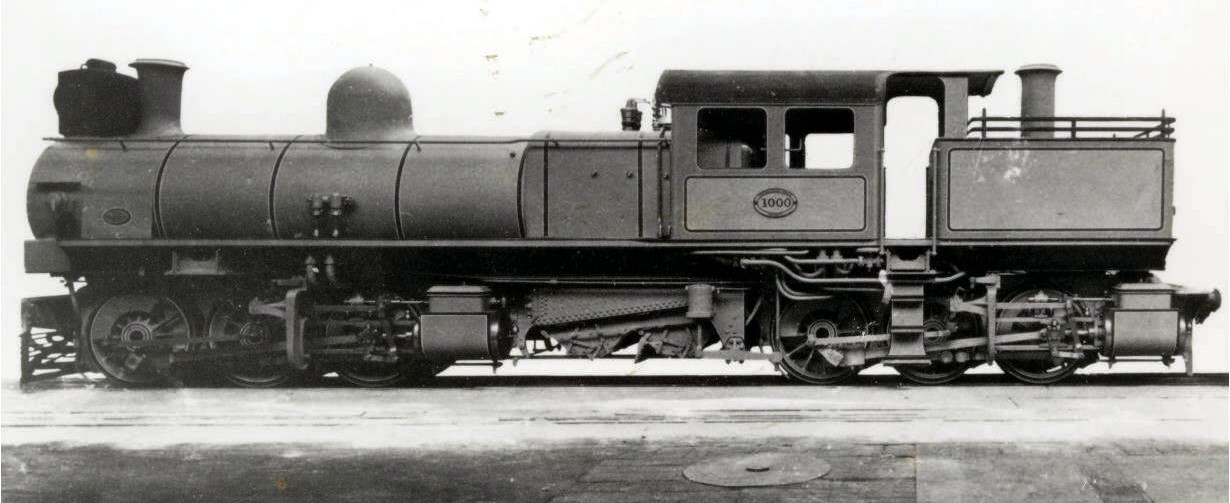
Works picture of CSAR Class M no. 1000 sans tender, c. 1904
