= Oliver Bulleid =

British railway engineer (1882-1970)

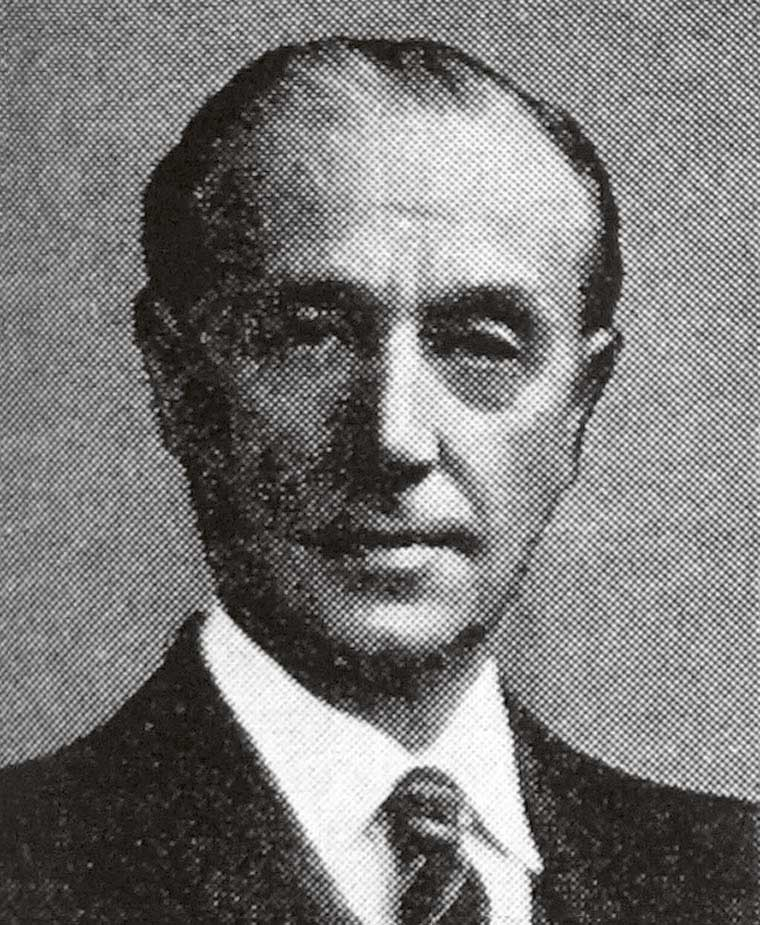
- Bulleid in 1947
- Born: 19 September 1882; Invercargill, New Zealand
- Died: 25 April 1970 (aged 87); Malta

Oliver Vaughan Snell Bulleid CBE (19 September 1882 – 25 April 1970) was a British railway and mechanical engineer best known as the Chief Mechanical Engineer (CME) of the Southern Railway between 1937 and the 1948 nationalisation, developing a number of well-known locomotives.

== Early life and Great Northern Railway ==
He was born in Invercargill, New Zealand, to William Bulleid and his wife Marian Pugh, both British immigrants. On the death of his father in 1889, his mother returned to Llanfyllin, Wales, where the family home had been, with Bulleid. In 1901, after a technical education at Accrington Grammar School, he joined the Great Northern Railway (GNR) at Doncaster at the age of 18, as an apprentice under Henry Ivatt, the Chief Mechanical Engineer (CME). After a four-year apprenticeship, he became the assistant to the Locomotive Running Superintendent, and a year later, the Doncaster Works manager. In 1908, he left to work in Paris with the French division of Westinghouse Electric Corporation as a Test Engineer, and was soon promoted to Assistant Works Manager and Chief Draughtsman. Later that year, he married Marjorie Ivatt, Henry Ivatt's youngest daughter.

A brief period working for the Board of Trade followed from 1910, arranging exhibitions in Brussels, Paris and Turin. He was able to travel widely in Europe, later including a trip with Nigel Gresley, William Stanier and Frederick Hawksworth, to Belgium, in 1934, to see a metre-gauge bogie locomotive. In December 1912, he rejoined the GNR as Personal Assistant to Nigel Gresley, the new CME. Gresley was only six years Bulleid's senior. The First World War intervened; Bulleid joined the British Army and was assigned to the rail transport arm, rising to the rank of Major. After the war, Bulleid returned to the GNR as the Manager of the Wagon and Carriage Works.

== London and North Eastern Railway ==
The Grouping, in 1923, of Britain's financially troubled railways, saw the GNR subsumed into the new London and North Eastern Railway (LNER), and Gresley was appointed the CME. He brought Bulleid back to Doncaster to be his assistant. During this period, Gresley produced the majority of his famous locomotives and innovations, and Bulleid had a hand in a number of them, including the P1 2-8-2 freight locomotive, the U1 2-8-0+0-8-2 Garratt freight locomotive, the P2 2-8-2 express locomotive and the A4 4-6-2 express locomotive.

== Southern Railway and British Railways ==
In 1937, Bulleid accepted the post of CME of the Southern Railway (SR) at an annual salary of £3,000, after Richard Maunsell retired. His first contribution to the SR was to oversee the construction of three 350 hp (260 kW) six-wheeled diesel-electric shunters ordered by Maunsell in 1936; three were built and proved effective, with an order placed for eight more, though this was cancelled owing to the onset of the Second World War. Between 1949 and 1952, a further 26 of Bulleid's amended version of these locomotives were delivered and later became British Rail Class 12.

In 1938, Bulleid gained approval to build the Merchant Navy class of modern 4-6-2 "Pacifics", undoubtedly inspired by Gresley but also drawing on his experiences from across Europe and with all the most modern equipment: a partially welded boiler and firebox rather than traditional rivetted designs, thermic syphons and a high-pressure boiler. It also included chain-driven valve-gear immersed in an oil bath, a feature that was controversial and later caused problems if not maintained properly, which was difficult, due to conditions, after WW2.

Bulleid, like other engineers, had long felt that it was not ideal to have working parts exposed to the elements, where they were subject to all the dirt thrown up from the track. He also thought that steam engines should get nearer to the internal combustion engine, which enclosed the working parts and used pump lubrication to keep it all running smoothly. Another advantage of enclosing the valve gear would be reduced day-to-day maintenance. Hoever, there were design errors in the casing used for the oil bath, which led to leaks.

The first Merchant Navy, 21C1 Channel Packet, was built in 1941 and 29 followed, the last being 35030 Elder Dempster Lines. The smaller SR West Country and Battle of Britain classes followed in 1945. 110 were built, of which 21C101 Exeter was the first. His other major steam locomotive design, the Q1 "Austerity" 0-6-0 freight engine, appeared in 1942. All steam locomotives designed by Bulleid for the SR had his BFB disc wheels, which gave more even tyre support. This did not eliminate the need for balance weights, but the set-up of the Bulleid valve gear enabled a locomotive with no hammer blow. When the locomotives were rebuilt with Walschaerts valve gear, balance weights were installed in the wheels to reduce hammer blow.

Bulleid played a major role in the electrification of the SR, including infrastructure, electric multiple units and electric locomotives. He designed the bodies for the two electric locomotives CC1 and CC2 in 1941 and 1945. A third example was built by British Railways in 1948 and numbered 20003. Towards the end of his tenure at the SR, he was responsible for the design and construction of Britain's only double-deck passenger trains, the two units of the 4DD class.

His final steam locomotive design for the SR was the unconventional Leader, appearing in 1949, after nationalisation. This had the boiler, coal and water supplies and everything else encased in a smooth double-ended body reminiscent of a diesel locomotive. The drive was through two six-wheel bogies, each with three cylinders. The axles on each bogie were connected by chains. The Leader was innovative but unsuccessful; after Bulleid had left British Railways, the project was cancelled.

Bulleid also had responsibility for coaching stock, an area in which he had an active interest. SR coaches, the newest designed by Richard Maunsell, were solid but old-fashioned. Bulleid designs built on the best of the existing designs, while making improvements, and his coaches were known for their comfort and spaciousness. They were popular with the travelling public, and a number of the design features such as the size and layout were used by British Railways for their standard Mark I passenger coaches.

Bulleid was briefly the CME of British Railways Southern Region. During this period, his two prototype diesel electric locomotives appeared.

== Córas Iompair Éireann ==
In February 1950, Bulleid was appointed CME of Córas Iompair Éireann (CIÉ), the nationalised transport authority of the Republic of Ireland, having been a consulting engineer to CIÉ since 1949. He led the first major dieselisation programme, which involved the procurement of diesel multiple units from AEC of Southall (the 2600 class), 94 Crossley-engined diesel locomotives (60 CIE 001 Class and 34 CIE 201 Class) from Metropolitan-Vickers and 12 Sulzer-engined diesel locomotives (CIE 101 Class) from the Birmingham Railway Carriage and Wagon Company. This began a transformation of railway traction in Ireland, although the locomotives proved unreliable until most were re-engined.

Bulleid developed two prototype peat-burning steam locomotives, one a converted coal-fired traditional steam locomotive of 2-6-0 wheel arrangement and the other, CC1, new and fully enclosed, along the lines of the Leader design. CIÉ did not adopt peat-fired traction for widespread use.

== Recognition and retirement ==
Bulleid was elected president of the Institution of Mechanical Engineers for 1946. He was also president of the Institution of Locomotive Engineers and of the Institute of Welding, and was elected to the Smeatonian Society of Civil Engineers.

He was appointed CBE in the 1949 New Year Honours.

Bulleid retired in 1958, moving to Belstone in Devon, then Exmouth. He was awarded an Honorary Doctorate of Science by the University of Bath in 1967. Shortly after, he moved to Malta, where he died in 1970 aged 87.

His obituary in The Times described Bulleid as "the last truly original and progressive mechanical engineer of the steam locomotive era in Britain".

British Rail Class 73/1 electro-diesel locomotive No. 73128 is called "O. V. S. Bulleid CBE".

== Patents ==
- GB547156, published 17 August 1942, Improvements in and relating to locomotive steam engine valve gear arrangements
- GB547180, published 17 August 1942, Improvements in piston slide valves for engines
- GB616445, published 21 January 1949, Improvements relating to locomotive and like steam boilers
- GB819493, published 2 September 1959, Improvements relating to brake apparatus for railway vehicles

Business positions
| Preceded by Richard Maunsell | Chief Mechanical Engineer of the Southern Railway; 1937–1947 | Company nationalised |
| Preceded by C.F. Tyndall | Chief Mechanical Engineer of Córas Iompair Éireann; 1950–1958 | Unknown |
Professional and academic associations
| Preceded by Andrew Robertson | President of the Institution of Mechanical Engineers; 1946 | Succeeded by Dudley Gordon |
