= 0-6-6-0 =

Articulated locomotive wheel arrangement

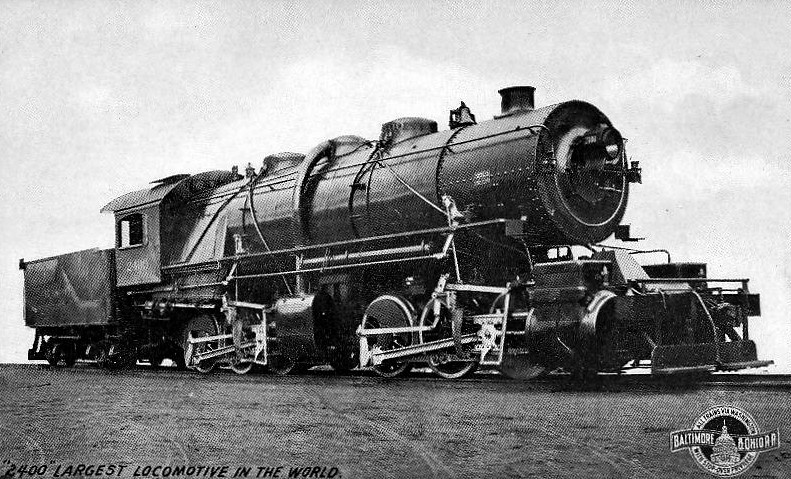
- Baltimore and Ohio’s Old Maude of 1904, the first 0-6-6-0 Mallet in the United States
Equivalent classifications
- UIC class: (C)C
- French class: 030+030
- Turkish class: 33+33
- Swiss class: 3/3+3/3
- Russian class: 0-3-0+0-3-0
First known tank engine version
- First use: 1916
- Country: Germany
- Locomotive: Saxon Class XV HTV
- Railway: Royal Saxon State Railways
- Designer: Heinrich Lindner
- Builder: Sächsische Maschinenfabrik
First known tender engine version
- First use: 1904
- Country: United States of America
- Locomotive: Class O Old Maude
- Railway: Baltimore and Ohio Railroad
- Designer: American Locomotive Company
- Builder: American Locomotive Company

Under the Whyte notation for the classification of steam locomotives, a 0-6-6-0 wheel arrangement refers to a locomotive with two engine units mounted under a rigid locomotive frame, with the front engine unit pivoting and each engine unit with six coupled driving wheels without any leading or trailing wheels. The wheel arrangement was mostly used to describe Mallet locomotive types and in some occasions, Double Fairlie locomotives.

A similar wheel arrangement exists for Double Fairlie, Meyer, Kitson-Meyer and Garratt locomotives, but on these types it is referred to as 0-6-0+0-6-0 since both engine units are pivoting.

== Overview ==
The 0-6-6-0 wheel arrangement was used mostly on Mallet locomotives, on which the engine units were mounted either in tandem or facing each other. Double Fairlies with the 0-6-0+0-6-0 arrangement were sometimes referred to as 0-6-6-0 despite both engine units pivoting.

== Usage ==
=== Canada ===
The only compound Mallets to operate in Canada were the R1 class 0-6-6-0 Vaughan design locomotives, with the cylinder ends of the engine units facing each other. The class was owned by the Canadian Pacific Railway and served on the Big Hill in British Columbia, which had a 4.1% grade. Five locomotives were built between 1909 and 1911. A sixth one was built, but it was a simple expansion Mallet with two sets of high-pressure cylinders. All the locomotives in this class were later converted to 2-10-0 types and were used as shunting and transfer engines in Montreal.

=== China ===
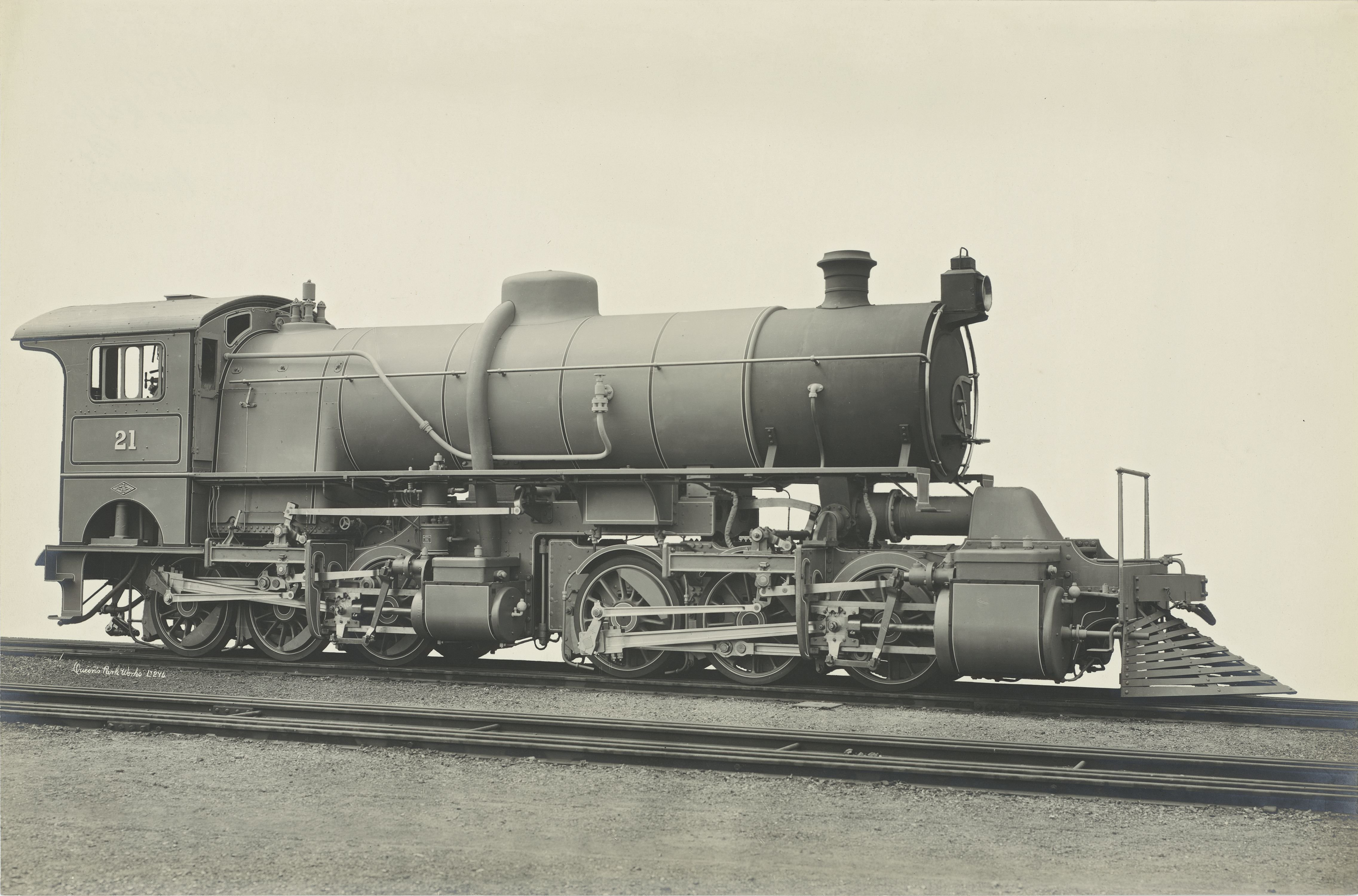
NBLC photographic grey works photo of Peking-Kalghar 0-6-6-0 No. 21 (1907)

China had four 0-6-6-0 compound Mallet type locomotives built by the North British Locomotive Company in 1907 (Nos. 21-24) for the Peking-Kalghan Railway. They were the first Mallets to be used in China.

=== Germany ===
The Saxon Class XV HTV was a class of goods train tank steam locomotive operated by the Royal Saxon State Railways, which had been conceived for hauling trains and acting as banking engines for routes in the Ore Mountains. The two CCh4v locomotives were built in 1916 at the Sächsischen Maschinenfabrik, formerly Hartmann. In 1925, the Deutsche Reichsbahn grouped them into their DRG Class 79.0. The locomotive was of unusual design with two fixed six-coupled engine units with a central double cylinder on each side, each with a high-pressure cylinder for the rear and a low-pressure cylinder for the front drive.

=== Myanmar (Burma) ===
The first class of 0-6-6-0 locomotives of the Burma Railways (BR) were a class of seven Double Fairlie tank locomotives built in batches of two and three in 1901 and 1906, respectively, by the Vulcan Foundry of Newtown-le-Willows, Lancashire (now Merseyside), England. They were designated as class H on the railway for use on the mountain line to Lashio. They were of better use than the ex-Northwestern Frontier class D 0-4-4-0T Fairlies in use prior. However, with the growing demand of goods trains (such as ore trains from the mines at Namtu), the Fairlies by then were too weak to meet demands and were replaced by 1911.

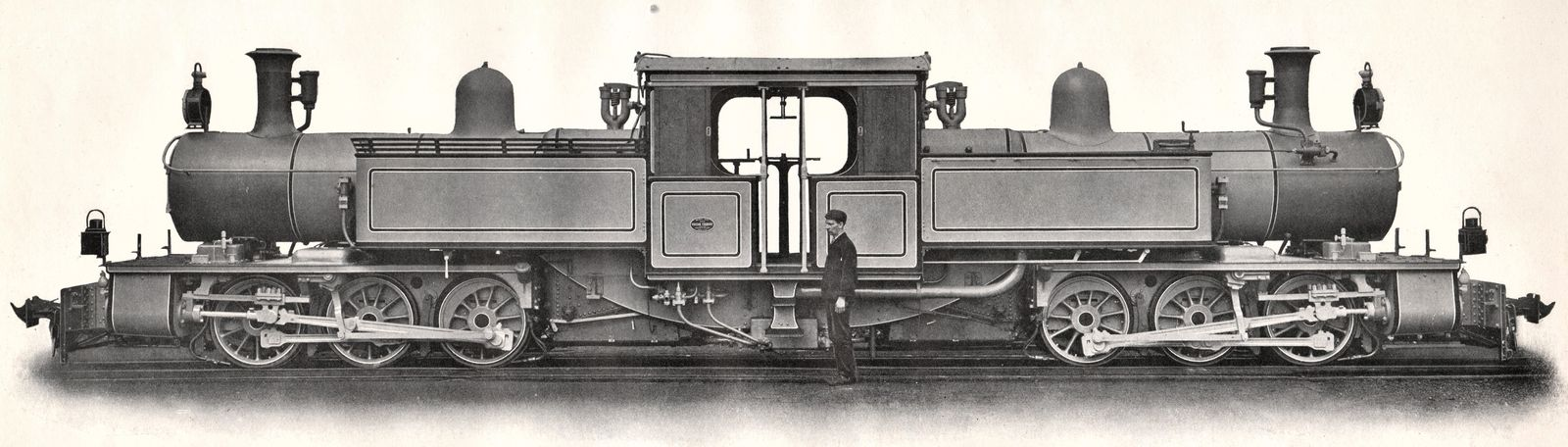
Burma Railways H Class

The next class of 0-6-6-0 locomotives of the Burma Railway were their class N mallets, built in two batches, the first by the North British Locomotive Company of Glasgow, Scotland from 1911 to 1921 and the last four being built by William Beardmore and Company of Glasgow, Scotland as well in 1924. The latter were given superheating and were designated class Ns.

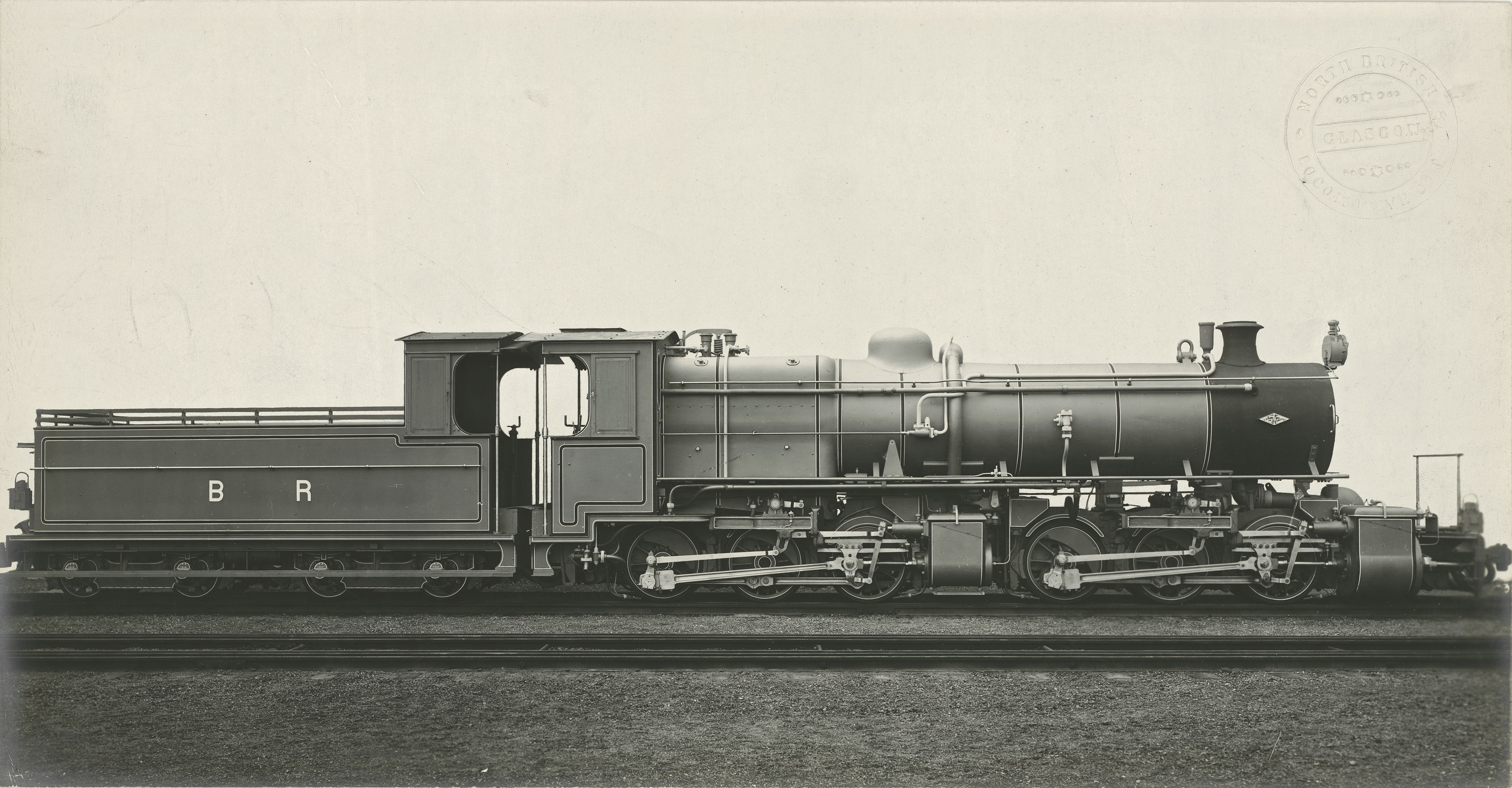
NBLC photo of Burma Railways N class in photographic grey (1911)

As traffic on the mountain line to Lashio had increased on the railway, a second mountain line was built to Kalaw. The earlier Double Fairlie locomotives were unable to meet the demands of the new line. Instead of purchasing more Fairlie locomotives the Burma Railway insisted on purchasing 22 0-6-6-0 compound-expansion Mallet-articulated type engines classified N. They replaced the H class locomotives before the Mallets themselves were outperformed by the later Garratt-articulated locomotives the company purchased later on.

Nearly all locomotives were lost during the Second World War. All N and Ns class locomotives were out of service by 1947.

=== India ===
India (then known as the British Raj) had 0-6-6-0 Mallet locomotives for the Madras and Southern Mahratta Railway (M&SM) built by the North British Locomotive Company in 1910. They were the exact same appearance-wise to the Burma Railways N class as they are of extremely similar design, the only notable visual differences being the tender being shorter, fitted with three axles instead of four on the N class. And the metal rack on top of the tender being taller and larger.

=== Iraq ===
47 0-6-6-0 locomotives were built by the Baldwin Locomotive Works for Iraq on use for the Iraqi State Railways from 1917 to 1918 they were given the classification of M. for the Russia's Archangel Railway, but owing to the Russian Revolution these were diverted to the British War Department, and most were used in Iraq.

=== Japan ===
54 0-6-6-0 compound Mallet locomotives were built for the Japanese Government Railways (JGR) in 1912. They were of three different classes; 9750, 9800, 9850. 24 class 9750s were built by the American Locomotive Company at their Schenectady works, 18 9800s were built by the Baldwin Locomotive Works, and 12 9850s were built by the Henschel & Son of Germany. They were one of the only articulated locomotives to see service in Japan.

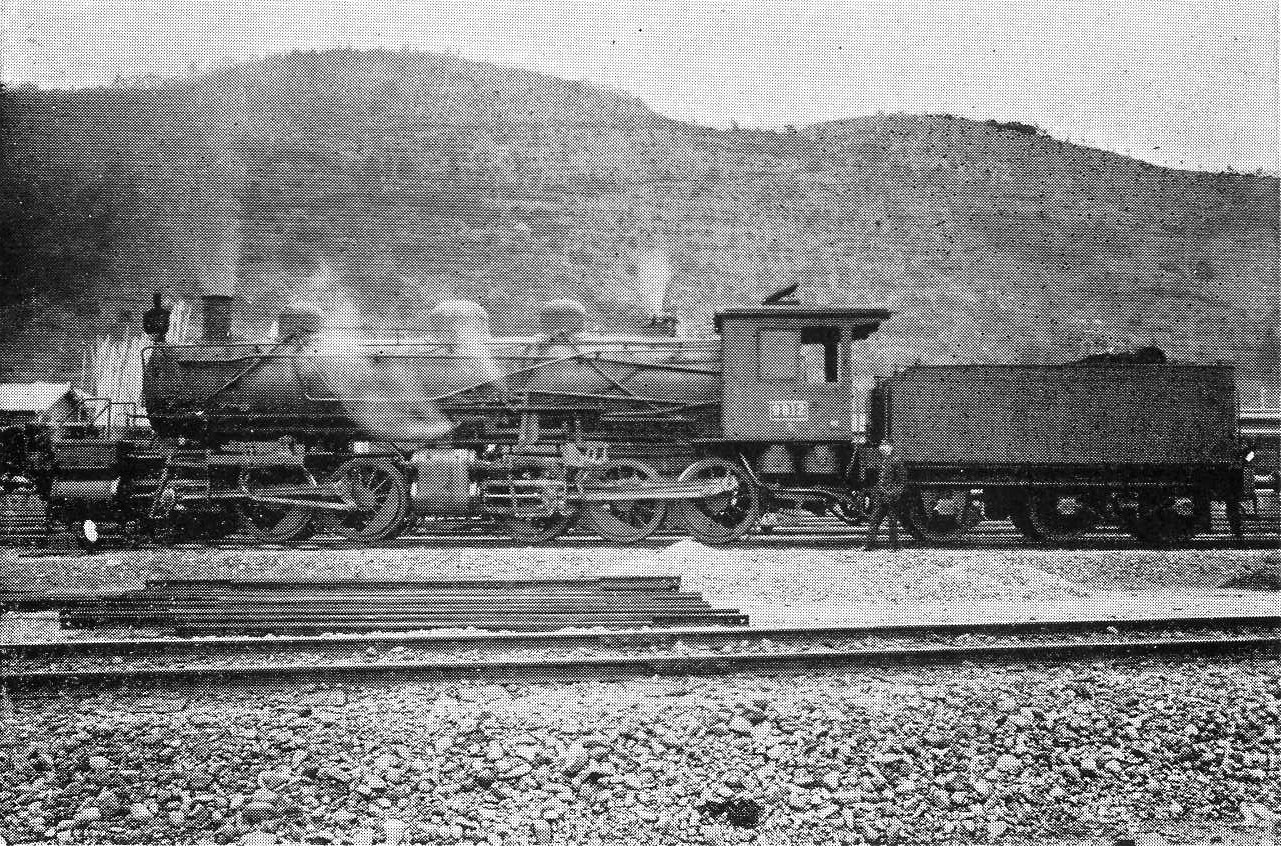
Baldwin-built JGR 9800 class

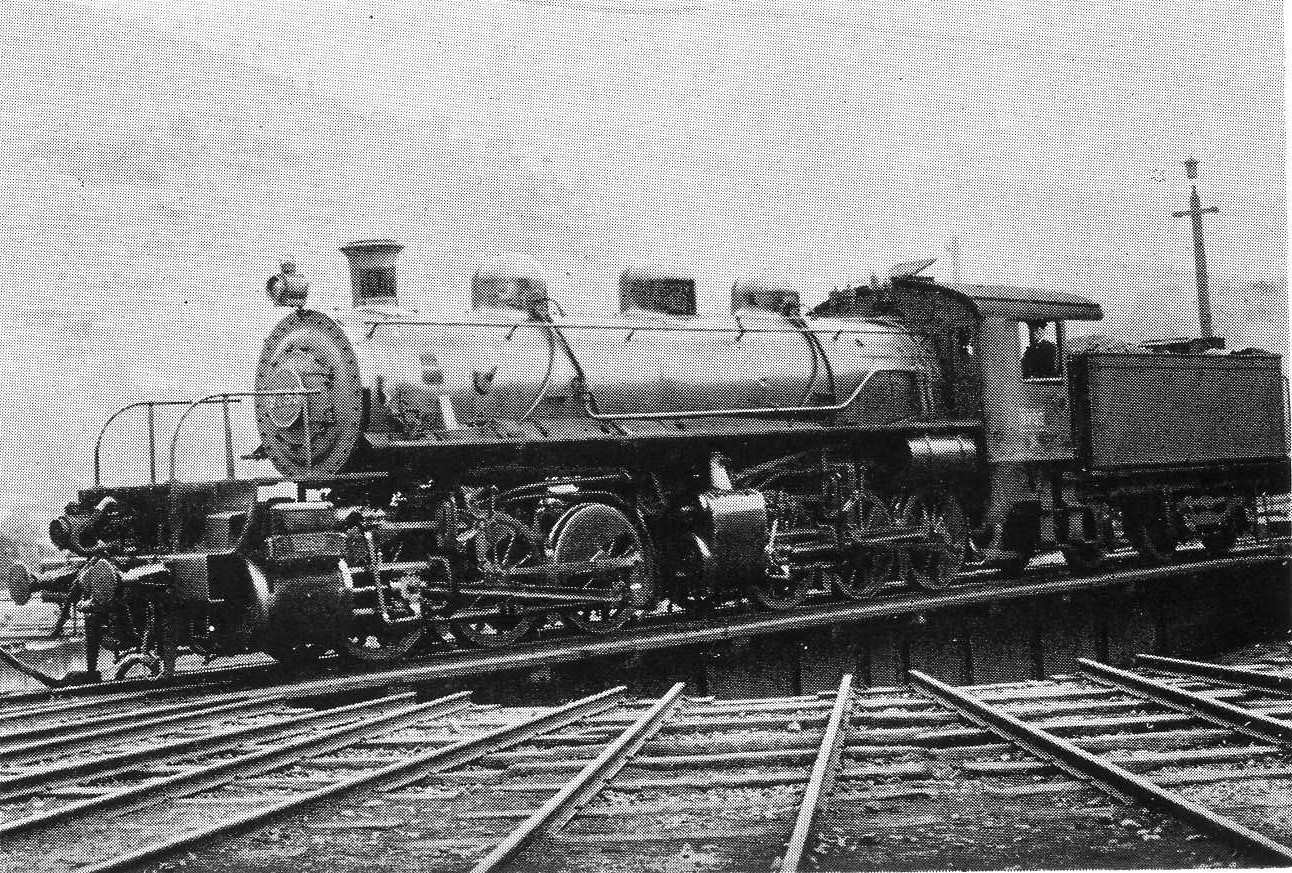
Alco-built JGR 9750 class

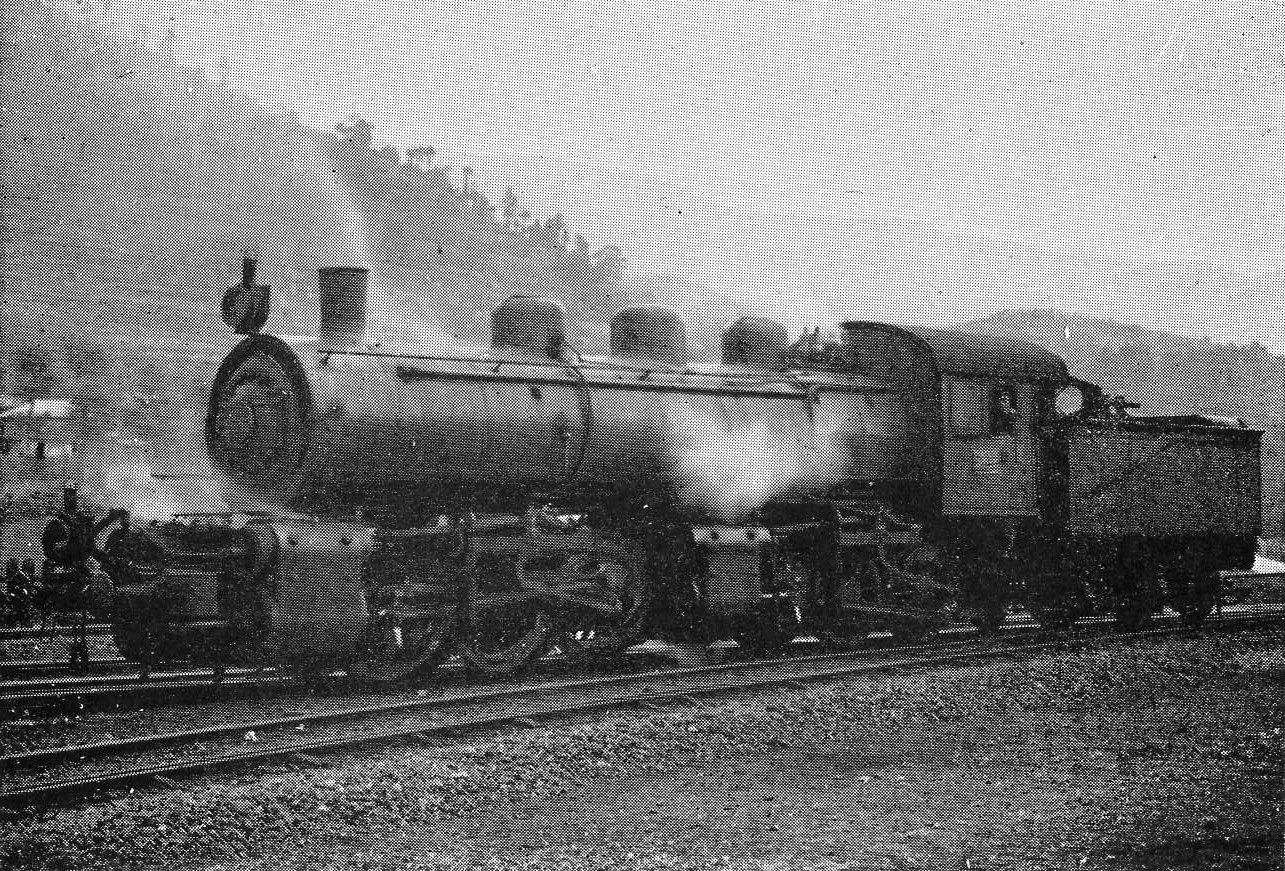
Henschel-built JGR 9850 class

They were used primarily as freight locomotives on the JGR network, they were all retired by 1933 after just 20 years of service. No. 9856 built by Henschel in 1912 is preserved at The Railway Museum in Saitama, Japan. The locomotive is non-operational and is sectioned to show its internal workings. The locomotive was formerly at the Manseibashi Railway Museum, and the Omiya Works before that. It is the only surviving articulated locomotive in Japan.

=== Jordan ===
0-6-6-0Ts were built for the Hedjaz Railway of Jordan as their class 210.

=== Philippines ===
There were at least two examples of the type in the Philippines. One is Pampanga Sugar Mill No. 8 built by Baldwin Locomotive Works in 1917. Originally built for the Murmansk–Arkhangelsk Railway, it was not delivered due to the Russian Revolution. It has been working for the company by 1959 though its status after that remains unknown, likely scrapped.

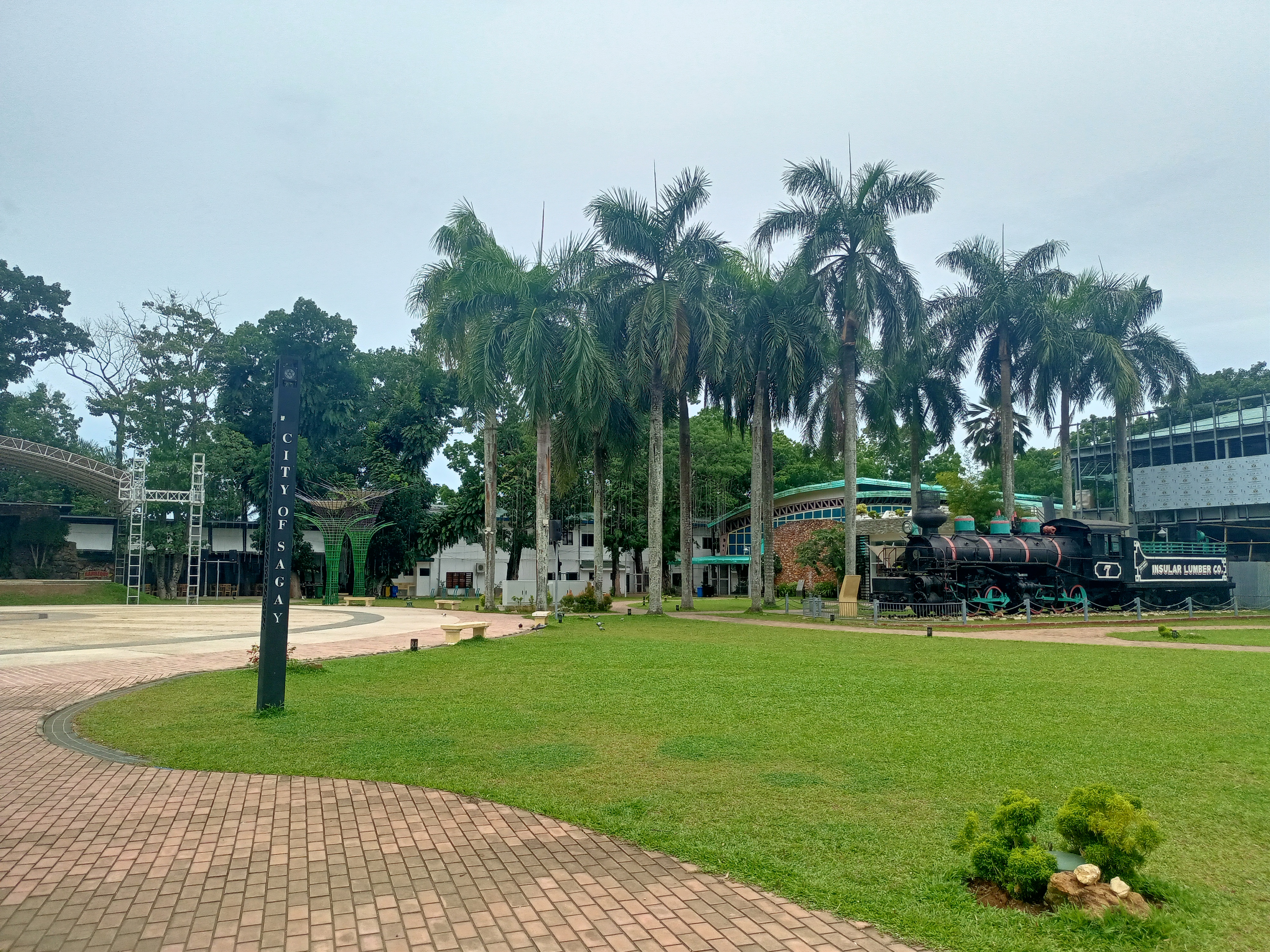
No. 7 Siete located at the plaza of Sagay

The other is Insular Lumber Company No. 7 Siete. Another Baldwin locomotive built in 1925. It remains the sole articulated locomotive to be preserved in the country as well as the largest to be preserved, now located in the plaza of Sagay, Negros Occidental.

=== Puerto Rico ===
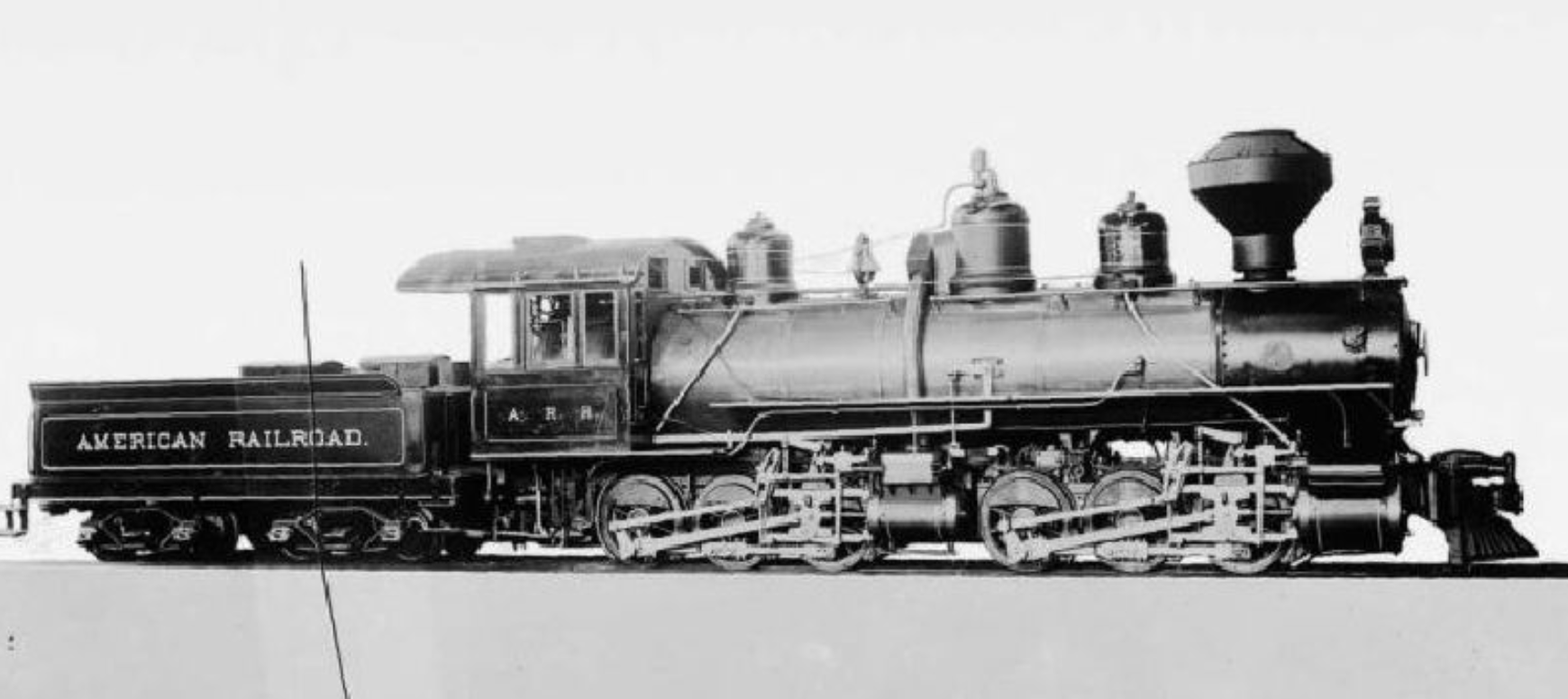
Puerto Rico 0-6-6-0

Puerto Rico had four 0-6-6-0 mallet locomotives built by the Baldwin Locomotive Works for the American Railroad Company of Puerto Rico (ARR) in 1904.

=== Spain ===
The Zaragoza-Pamplona (Later Norte De España) railway ordered 2 locomotives based on a contemporary design by M. Petiet in 1863, however they were not very successful and were all withdrawn and scrapped by 1883.

The Central De Aragón railway had various classes of this wheel arrangement, most of them tender engines, and one class being one of the first superheated locomotives in Spain. But very notable were some tank engines of this design, built in between 1899 and 1900, which after a few years were turned into 2-6-6-0 tender engines due to being overweight.

=== United States ===
The first Mallet locomotive in North America was built in the United States was of this type, the Baltimore and Ohio Railroad Class O no. 2400. Nicknamed Old Maude after a cartoon mule, it had a 71,500 pounds-force (318 kilonewtons) tractive effort and was a great success despite a top speed of only 21 miles per hour (34 kilometres per hour).

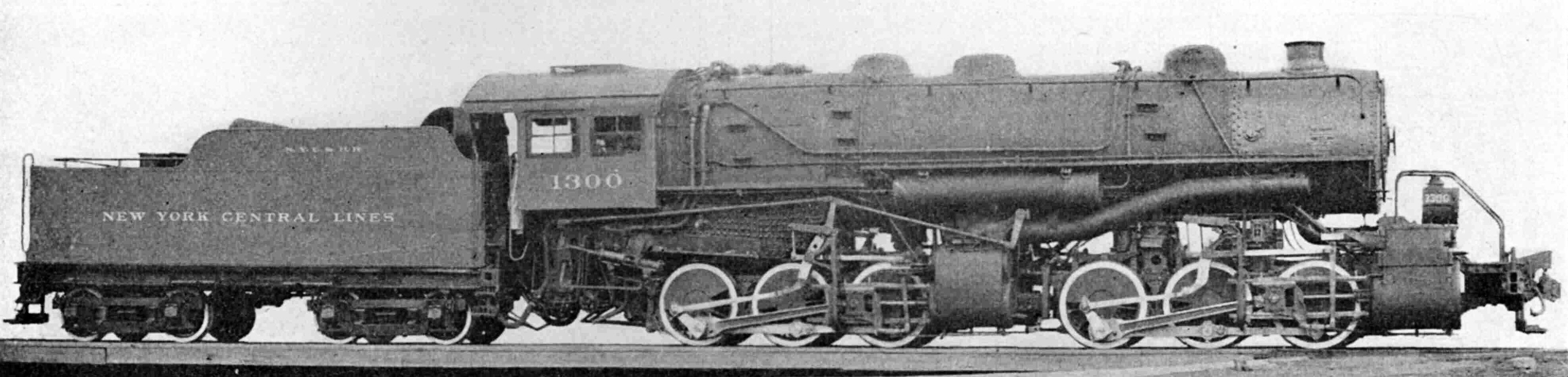
A 0-6-6-0 Mallet of the New York Central Railroad

The Kansas City Southern Railway used the type as freight engines, with pilots, and had the most of them with twelve locomotives. The 0-6-6-0 wheel arrangement was also used to a limited extent on logging railroads and in mountain terminals.

The Western Maryland Railway had a small fleet of 2-6-6-2 locomotives which, at one time, were the heaviest locomotives in the world, weighing 264 short tons (236 long tons; 239 t). They were all converted to 0-6-6-0 locomotives for heavy switching.

=== Uganda ===
The Uganda Railway had Mallets of this wheel configuration built by the North British Locomotive Company in 1913. They were numbered 109-118 and were designated as the M class.

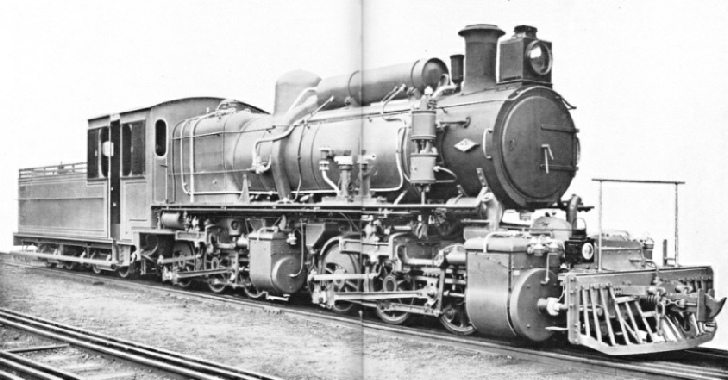
NBLC works photo of the Uganda Railway class M in 1913

They shared an extreme resemblance with the Burma Railways N/Ns class and the Madras and Southern Mahratta Railway 0-6-6-0. Main visual differences being the air resivor located atop the boiler between the smokestack and dome along with extra piping and piston valves inside of slide valves on the high pressure cylinders unlike the former two aforementioned Mallets.
