= List of SR West Country and Battle of Britain class locomotives =

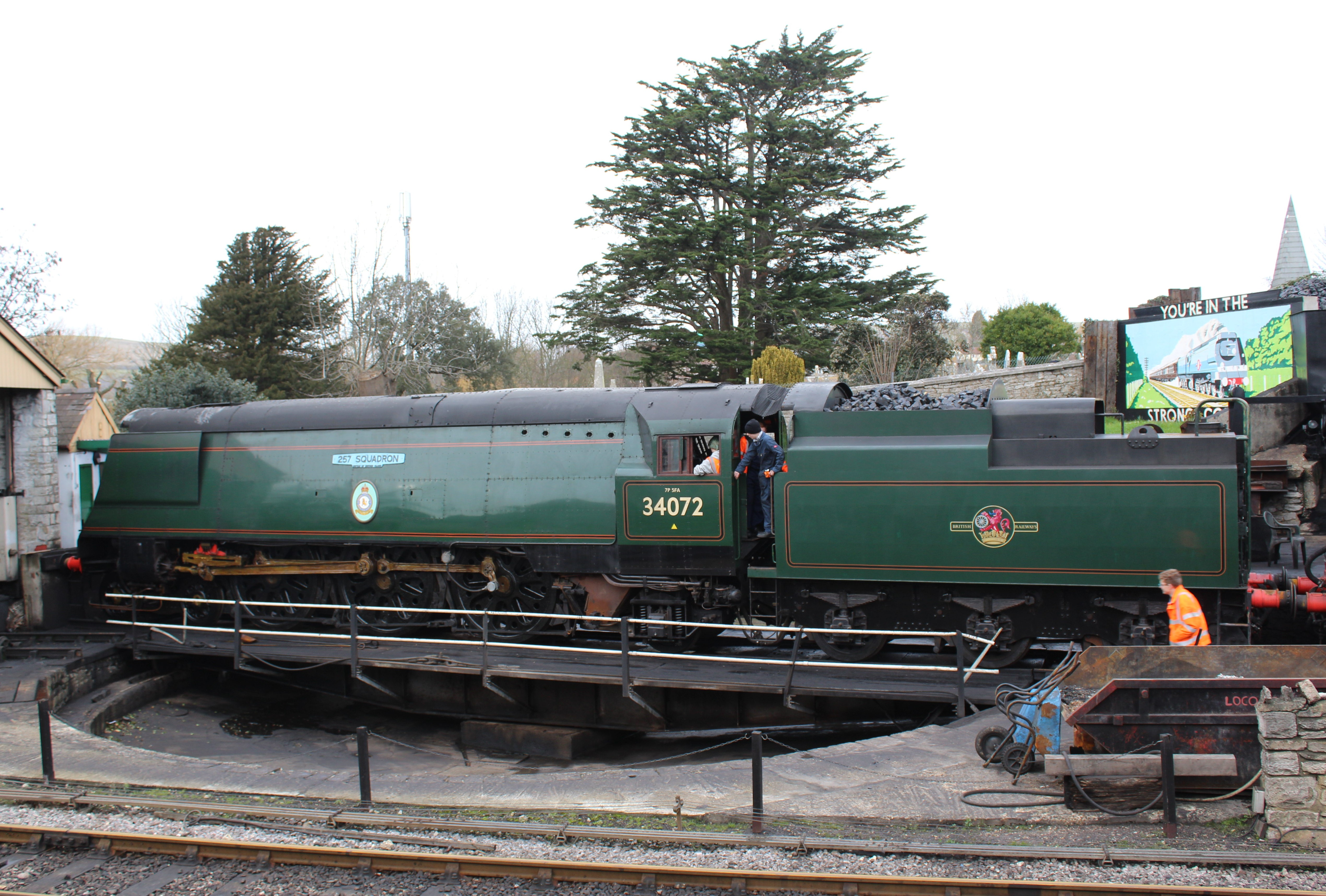
Unrebuilt Battle of Britain class No. 34072 257 Squadron, as preserved, pictured at Swanage, Dorset in 2019

Below are the names and numbers of the steam locomotives that comprised the Bulleid light pacifics, the West Country and Battle of Britain classes of locomotives that ran on the British Southern Railway network. They represented a publicity success for the Southern Railway, with the West Country class highlighting the names of places served by the Southern Railway, while the Battle of Britain locomotives constituted a roving memorial to the fighter pilots who fought during the Battle of Britain, and the actions of RAF Fighter Command as a whole. No. 34066 Spitfire and No. 34086 219 Squadron were at one point in time candidates for preservation, but No. 34023 Blackmoor Vale was chosen instead due to it being in better condition than No. 34066 and No. 34086.

== Table of locomotive details ==
Key to notes:

- BoB/NA – Battle of Britain locomotive that carried no coat of arms
- C – Complete
- GOE – carried Giesl oblong ejector, fitted 1962 (34064); mid-1980s (34092)
- S – ex-Scrapyard, and awaiting future restoration
- WC/NA – West Country locomotive that carried no coat of arms

=== Southern Railway batch ===
West Country and Battle of Britain class locomotives
BR No.	SR No.	Name	Builder	Built	Rebuilt	Withdrawn	Current location of Preserved Locomotives	Image	Notes
34001	21C101	Exeter	Brighton	May 1945	November 1957	July 1967			
34002	21C102	Salisbury	Brighton	June 1945		April 1967			
34003	21C103	Plymouth	Brighton	June 1945	September 1957	September 1964			
34004	21C104	Yeovil	Brighton	July 1945	February 1958	July 1967			
34005	21C105	Barnstaple	Brighton	July 1945	June 1957	October 1966			
34006	21C106	Bude	Brighton	July 1945		March 1967			
34007	21C107	Wadebridge	Brighton	August 1945		October 1965	Watercress Line		Under overhaul as of 2026. Oldest surviving light pacific.
34008	21C108	Padstow	Brighton	September 1945	June 1960	June 1967			
34009	21C109	Lyme Regis	Brighton	September 1945	July 1960	October 1966			
34010	21C110	Sidmouth	Brighton	September 1945	February 1959	March 1965	Tyseley/Sellindge, Kent. (Southern Locomotives Ltd.)		S, Under restoration.
34011	21C111	Tavistock	Brighton	October 1945		November 1963			
34012	21C112	Launceston	Brighton	October 1945	January 1958	December 1966			
34013	21C113	Okehampton	Brighton	October 1945	October 1957	July 1967			
34014	21C114	Budleigh Salterton	Brighton	November 1945	March 1958	March 1965			
34015	21C115	Exmouth	Brighton	November 1945		April 1967			
34016	21C116	Bodmin	Brighton	November 1945	April 1958	June 1964	Carnforth		C, Undergoing Restoration to Mainline standards
34017	21C117	Ilfracombe	Brighton	December 1945	November 1957	October 1966			
34018	21C118	Axminster	Brighton	December 1945	September 1958	July 1967			
34019	21C119	Bideford	Brighton	December 1945		March 1967			
34020	21C120	Seaton	Brighton	December 1945		September 1964			
34021	21C121	Dartmoor	Brighton	January 1946	December 1957	July 1967			
34022	21C122	Exmoor	Brighton	January 1946	December 1957	April 1965			WC/NA
34023	21C123	Blackmoor Vale/ Blackmore Vale	Brighton	February 1946		July 1967	Bluebell Railway		C, WC/NA (as-built, Coat of Arms added in preservation), Static display awaiting overhaul (at Horsted Keynes)
34024	21C124	Tamar Valley	Brighton	February 1946	February 1961	July 1967			WC/NA
34025	21C125	Rough Tor/ Whimple	Brighton	March 1946	November 1957	July 1967			WC/NA/ Renamed "Whimple" 1948
34026	21C126	Yes Tor	Brighton	March 1946	February 1958	September 1966			WC/NA
34027	21C127	Taw Valley	Brighton	April 1946	September 1957	August 1964	Severn Valley Railway		C, WC/NA (as-built, Coat of Arms added in preservation), Operational (Loco is air braked but won't be going mainline).
34028	21C128	Eddystone	Brighton	April 1946	August 1957	May 1964	Swanage Railway. (Southern Locomotives Ltd.)		C, WC/NA, Operational.
34029	21C129	Lundy	Brighton	May 1946	December 1958	September 1964			WC/NA
34030	21C130	Watersmeet	Brighton	May 1946		September 1964			WC/NA
34031	21C131	Torrington	Brighton	June 1946	December 1958	February 1965			
34032	21C132	Camelford	Brighton	June 1946	October 1960	October 1966			WC/NA
34033	21C133	Chard	Brighton	July 1946		December 1965			WC/NA
34034	21C134	Honiton	Brighton	July 1946	August 1960	July 1967			
34035	21C135	Shaftesbury	Brighton	July 1946		June 1963			WC/NA
34036	21C136	Westward Ho	Brighton	July 1946	September 1960	July 1967			WC/NA
34037	21C137	Clovelly	Brighton	August 1946	March 1958	July 1967			WC/NA
34038	21C138	Lynton	Brighton	September 1946		June 1966			WC/NA
34039	21C139	Boscastle	Brighton	September 1946	January 1959	May 1965	Great Central Railway		C, WC/NA, Under overhaul
34040	21C140	Crewkerne	Brighton	September 1946	October 1960	July 1967			
34041	21C141	Wilton	Brighton	October 1946		January 1966			WC/NA
34042	21C142	Dorchester	Brighton	October 1946	January 1959	October 1965			
34043	21C143	Combe Martin	Brighton	October 1946		June 1963			WC/NA. Also featured in The Titfield Thunderbolt as the Bulleid Pacific in the opening scene.
34044	21C144	Woolacombe	Brighton	October 1946	May 1960	May 1967			WC/NA
34045	21C145	Ottery St Mary	Brighton	October 1946	October 1958	June 1964			WC/NA Scrapped at Woodham Bros, Barry, in 1964
34046	21C146	Braunton	Brighton	November 1946	February 1959	October 1965	Mainline Certified, Home base at Southall		C, WC/NA; Operational, Mainline Certified. Owned by Jeremy Hosking, Operated by Locomotive Services
34047	21C147	Callington	Brighton	November 1946	October 1958	June 1967			WC/NA
34048	21C148	Crediton	Brighton	November 1946	March 1959	March 1966			
34049	21C149	Anti-Aircraft Command	Brighton	December 1946		December 1963			
34050	21C150	Royal Observer Corps	Brighton	December 1946	August 1958	August 1965			
34051	21C151	Winston Churchill	Brighton	December 1946		September 1965	National Railway Museum		C, Static exhibit at National Railway Museum Shildon after cosmetic overhaul at Mid Hants Railway.
34052	21C152	Lord Dowding	Brighton	December 1946	September 1958	July 1967			
34053	21C153	Sir Keith Park	Brighton	January 1947	November 1958	October 1965	Spa Valley Railway. (Southern Locomotives Ltd.)		C, Operational.
34054	21C154	Lord Beaverbrook	Brighton	January 1947		September 1964			
34055	21C155	Fighter Pilot	Brighton	February 1947		June 1963			
34056	21C156	Croydon	Brighton	February 1947	December 1960	May 1967			
34057	21C157	Biggin Hill	Brighton	March 1947		May 1967			
34058	21C158	Sir Frederick Pile	Brighton	March 1947	November 1960	October 1964	Sellindge, Kent. (Southern Locomotives Ltd.)		S, Under restoration.
34059	21C159	Sir Archibald Sinclair	Brighton	April 1947	March 1960	May 1966	Bluebell Railway		C, Operational.
34060	21C160	25 Squadron	Brighton	April 1947	November 1960	July 1967			
34061	21C161	73 Squadron	Brighton	April 1947		August 1964			
34062	21C162	17 Squadron	Brighton	May 1947	April 1959	June 1964			
34063	21C163	229 Squadron	Brighton	May 1947		August 1965			
34064	21C164	Fighter Command	Brighton	July 1947		May 1966			GOE
34065	21C165	Hurricane	Brighton	July 1947		April 1964			
34066	21C166	Spitfire	Brighton	September 1947		September 1966			Locomotive involved in the Lewisham disaster, 4 December 1957. Considered a candidate for preservation.
34067	21C167	Tangmere	Brighton	September 1947		November 1963	Mainline Certified, Carnforth MPD		Operational on the Main Line.
34068	21C168	Kenley	Brighton	October 1947		December 1963			
34069	21C169	Hawkinge	Brighton	October 1947		November 1963			
34070	21C170	Manston	Brighton	November 1947		August 1964	Swanage Railway. (Southern Locomotives Ltd.)		C, Operational.

=== British Railways batch ===
Battle of Britain and West Country class locomotives
BR No.	Name	Builder	Built	Rebuilt	Withdrawn	Location of Preserved Locomotives	Image	Notes
34071	601 Squadron	Brighton	April 1948	May 1960	April 1967			
34072	257 Squadron	Brighton	April 1948		June 1964	Swanage Railway. (Southern Locomotives Ltd.)		C, Operational
34073	249 Squadron	Brighton	May 1948		June 1964	Carnforth MPD		
34074	46 Squadron	Brighton	May 1948		June 1963			
34075	264 Squadron	Brighton	June 1948		April 1964			
34076	41 Squadron	Brighton	June 1948		January 1966			
34077	603 Squadron	Brighton	July 1948	July 1960	March 1967			
34078	222 Squadron	Brighton	July 1948		September 1964			
34079	141 Squadron	Brighton	July 1948		February 1966			
34080	74 Squadron	Brighton	August 1948		September 1964			
34081	92 Squadron	Brighton	September 1948		August 1964	East Lancashire Railway		Moved from the Nene Valley Railway in 2024
34082	615 Squadron	Brighton	September 1948	April 1960	April 1966			
34083	605 Squadron	Brighton	October 1948		June 1964			
34084	253 Squadron	Brighton	November 1948		October 1965			
34085	501 Squadron	Brighton	November 1948	June 1960	September 1965			
34086	219 Squadron	Brighton	December 1948		June 1966			Considered a candidate for preservation.
34087	145 Squadron	Brighton	December 1948	December 1960	July 1967			
34088	213 Squadron	Brighton	December 1948	April 1960	March 1967			
34089	602 Squadron	Brighton	December 1948	November 1960	July 1967			
34090	Sir Eustace Missenden, Southern Railway	Brighton	February 1949	August 1960	July 1967			
34091	Weymouth	Brighton	September 1949		September 1964			
34092	Wells	Brighton	September 1949		November 1964	East Lancashire Railway. Renamed "City of Wells" 1950		C, GOE, Undergoing overhaul
34093	Saunton	Brighton	October 1949	May 1960	July 1967			WC/NA
34094	Mortehoe	Brighton	October 1949		August 1964			WC/NA Scrapped at Woodham Bros, Barry, 1965
34095	Brentor	Eastleigh	October 1949	January 1961	July 1967			WC/NA
34096	Trevone	Brighton	November 1949	April 1961	September 1964			WC/NA
34097	Holsworthy	Eastleigh	November 1949	March 1961	April 1967			WC/NA
34098	Templecombe	Brighton	December 1949	February 1961	June 1967			WC/NA
34099	Lynmouth	Eastleigh	December 1949		November 1964			
34100	Appledore	Brighton	December 1949	September 1960	July 1967			WC/NA
34101	Hartland	Eastleigh	February 1950	September 1960	July 1966	North Yorkshire Moors Railway		C, WC/NA; Under overhaul
34102	Lapford	Eastleigh	March 1950		July 1967			WC/NA
34103	Calstock	Brighton	February 1950		September 1965			WC/NA
34104	Bere Alston	Eastleigh	April 1950	May 1961	June 1967			WC/NA
34105	Swanage	Brighton	March 1950		October 1964	Mid Hants Railway		C, WC/NA; Under overhaul. Youngest surviving light pacific.
34106	Lydford	Brighton	March 1950		September 1964			WC/NA
34107	Blandford Forum	Brighton	April 1950		September 1964			
34108	Wincanton	Brighton	April 1950	May 1961	June 1967			WC/NA
34109	Sir Trafford Leigh-Mallory	Brighton	May 1950	March 1961	September 1964			
34110	66 Squadron	Brighton	January 1951		November 1963			BoB/NA

== Location links ==
- Bluebell Railway
- Great Central Railway (preserved)
- Keighley and Worth Valley Railway
- National Railway Museum
- Nene Valley Railway
- North Norfolk Railway
- North Yorkshire Moors Railway
- Severn Valley Railway
- Southern Locomotives Ltd
- Swanage Railway
- Watercress Line
- West Somerset Railway
