= Rolling stock of the Swanage Railway =

The Swanage Railway is a railway branch line in Dorset, England, opened in 1885 and now operated as a heritage railway.

== Steam locomotives ==
=== Operational ===
Number and name	Origin	Wheel arrangement	Class	Mainline Certified	Notes	Photograph
31806	SR	2-6-0	SR U class	No	Built in 1928 and arrived in 2014. Returned to service following a major bottom end overhaul in 2019. Gained a new 'ten year' boiler insurance ticket after a boiler swap with N class 31874 at start of 2021.	
34028 Eddystone	SR	4-6-2	West Country Class	Yes (Note: Certified for full mainline use on the National Network)	Built in 1946. Arrived at the Swanage Railway in 1999 and owned by Southern Locomotives Limited. Arrived back at the line on Monday 26 April 2021 after overhaul at Herston Works In September 2024, an announcement was made by 34028's owners (Southern Locomotives Ltd) that 34028 Eddystone is mainline certified as of 2025.	
34070 Manston	SR	4-6-2	Battle of Britain Class	No	Built in 1947. Boiler ticket expired in July 2018. Effectively withdrawn due to damage sustained in low-speed collision with 80104, due to other locomotive commitments by the owning group, Southern Locomotives Ltd, and the necessary repair taking the loco beyond her boiler expiration in July 2018. The locomotive was at Tyseley where repairs to the front end were completed. 34070 arrived back on the railway in November 2022.	
34072 257 Squadron	SR	4-6-2	Battle of Britain Class	No	Built in 1948. Arrived at the Swanage Railway in 1990 and owned by Southern Locomotives Limited. Returned to the railway in August 2017 and after final completion of her overhaul at Herston works and running in trials, she returned to service on 26 September 2018. Out of traffic most of 2021 due to failed main steam pipe; returned to traffic 2022. Went on hire to Spa Valley Railway in November 2022 for use on the railway's "Polar Express" trains. A decision was later made to have 34072 become a permanent resident of the Spa Valley Railway following the withdrawal of 34053 Sir Keith Park for overhaul earlier in 2022. Following an announcement by 34072's owners "Southern Locomotives Limited" that another SLL owned loco 34028 Eddystone was to be mainline certified in 2025, 34072 returned to Swanage as a full time resident to replace 34028 while Eddystone is away from Swanage hauling railtours.	
563	LSWR	4-4-0	T3 Class	No	Built 1893. Arrived April 2017 after being transferred from the National Railway Museum to the Swanage Railway Trust. The locomotive was restored to working order at the Flour Mill workshops in the Forest of Dean. It was used for the stage productions of The Railway Children in Toronto in 2011 and at Kings Cross in 2014–17. 563 returned to traffic in October 2023, with trains for supporters running on 7th October.	

=== Undergoing overhaul, repair or restoration ===
Number and name	Origin	Wheel arrangement	Class	Mainline Certified	Notes	Photograph
30053	LSWR	0-4-4T	M7 Class	No	Built in 1905. Arrived at the Swanage Railway in 1987 and returned to service following restoration in 1992. It is owned by Drummond Locomotives Limited. Boiler ticket expired October 2017, but was withdrawn early due to necessary repairs which would take the loco past the boiler expiration date. The loco has been stripped and has now moved into Herston works. Its boiler is currently at the North Norfolk Railway undergoing overhaul.	
30120	LSWR	4-4-0	LSWR T9 Class	No	Built in 1899. On loan from the National Railway Museum. Boiler certificate expired in 2020. The National Railway Museum approved the Swanage Railway's proposal for the 4-4-0's overhaul in May 2026. Work is being split between Herston Works for the bottom end & Flour Mill in the Forest of Dean for both the boiler and tender. The overhaul is expected to cost £750,000 and will include the replacement of 30120's cylinder block. The locomotive is to be outshopped in Southern olive green on completion.	
31874	SR	2-6-0	SECR N class	No, to be certified	Built in 1925 and arrived in 2014. Has been under overhaul at Herston Works, was awaiting the arrival of its overhauled boiler. However the boiler when it returned in January 2021 from the boiler contractors, was placed on to U class 31806 instead, to allow that locomotive back in to service more quickly. 31874 currently awaits work to be started on 31806's previous boiler. The N was intended be mainline certified upon its return. March 2023 edition of Trackside Magazine lists the overhaul of this engine as being paused.	
34010 Sidmouth	SR	4-6-2	West Country Class	No, to be certified	Built in 1945. Arrived at the Swanage Railway in 2006 and owned by Southern Locomotives Limited. Under restoration in conjunction with 34028's overhaul. Being restored to mainline standards as 34028's eventual replacement.	
35025 Brocklebank Line	SR	4-6-2	SR Merchant Navy Class	No	Built 1948. Arrived in 2020. Under restoration. Became custodianship of the Southern Locomotives Ltd.	
80104	BR	2-6-4T	Standard Class 4	No	Built in 1955. Arrived at the Swanage Railway in 1984 and owned by Southern Locomotives Limited. Returned to service after overhaul in March 2015 with a new seven year ticket. Boiler ticket expires in May 2021. Returned to Swanage in September 2016 after undergoing axlebox repairs at Tyseley Locomotive Works, She suffered some damage as a result of a collision with 34070 in July 2017 but returned to service a few weeks later. Boiler ticket expired May 2021. Currently undergoing overhaul at Tyseley Locomotive Works.	
69 Norman	Hunslet Austerity	0-6-0ST	Austerity 0-6-0ST	No	Built in 1943. Arrived at the Swanage Railway in 2009 and owned by Southern Locomotives Limited. Its boiler ticket expired at the end of 2017. The overhaul is being undertaken by Bryn Engineering and once complete Norman will be heading off to the Spa Valley railway	

=== Stored ===
Number and name	Origin	Wheel arrangement	Class	Mainline Certified	Notes	Photograph
31625	SR	2-6-0	SR U class	No	Built 1928. Arrived August 2014 and is currently stored. Privately owned. Overhaul will commence after 31874.	

=== Former Swanage locomotives based elsewhere ===
Number and name	Origin	Wheel arrangement	Class	Notes	Photograph
34053 Sir Keith Park	SR	4-6-2	Battle of Britain Class	Built in 1947. Arrived at the Swanage Railway in 2009 and owned by Southern Locomotives Limited. Following the completion of her restoration in 2012 she was moved to the Severn Valley Railway originally as a visitor. It later became her home due to her not being needed at Swanage as two fellow light pacific engines were being used at that time. She returned to Swanage in January 2018 when her contract agreement at the SVR came to an end. SKP entered service at the March 2018 'Works Outing' gala. SKP is now based at the Spa Valley Railway. Boiler expired in 2022.SKP returned to the Swanage Railway for a short time in 2022 for storage before entering Herston works in November 2022 for the start of her overhaul.	

== Diesel locomotives ==
=== Operational ===
Number and name	Origin	Wheel arrangement	Class	Mainline Certified (1)	Notes	Photograph
D3551	BR	0-6-0DE	Class 08	No	Painted in LSWR lined black. Bodywork overhaul completed in summer 2017. Operational.	
D3591	BR	0-6-0DE	Class 08	No	Painted in British Railways green	
33111	British Rail	Bo-Bo	Class 33	No	Built in 1960 and owned by the 33/1 Preservation company limited. Returned to service in October 2015 after an overhaul.	
D6515 "Lt Jenny Lewis RN"	British Rail	Bo-Bo	Class 33	Yes	Built in 1960, Named in 2014 and owned by the 71A Locomotive Group. Certified for mainline running. Bodywork overhaul at Eastleigh completed April 2022.	

=== Undergoing overhaul, repair or restoration ===
Number and name	Origin	Wheel arrangement	Class	Notes	Photograph
4210132 "May"		0-4-0DM	Fowler 0-4-0DM	Built in 1957 and owned by the Swanage Railway.	
"Beryl"		4wPM	F.C.Hibberd Planet	Petrol Shunter. First loco to arrive at Swanage Station. Currently on static display at Corfe castle after restoration to static condition.	

=== DMUs ===
Origin	Number	Class	Mainline Certified	Notes	Photograph
British Rail	Unit 55028 Set No L128	Class 121	Yes, mainline registered in 2022	Built in 1960. Arrived at the Swanage Railway in 2009. The unit has been completely overhauled externally at Eastleigh and was returned to Swanage in July 2019 in preparation for undertaking services to Wareham.	
British Rail	Unit 51346, 51388 and Trailer Car 59486 Set No -	Class 117	Yes, mainline registered in 2022	Built in 1960. Arrived at the Swanage Railway in 2003, Trailer car 59846 in 2011. The 3 cars were returned to the railway in February 2020 for future use on the mainline connection to Wareham.	
British Rail	Unit 51356, 51392 and Trailer Car 59492 Set No L702	Class 117	No	Built 1959/60. Moved to the railway December 2014, to provide spares for Project Wareham, the unit was returned from Eastleigh in February 2020 and is now stored. Units, DMS 51398 Scrapped January 2012.	

== Electric Motive Power ==
=== Stored or on display ===
Origin	Number	Class	Notes	Photograph
British Rail	Unit 76298, 70855, 70824 and 76275 Set No 413	438	Owned by the Swanage 4-TC Group. 4 vehicles have now returned to the railway after full or partial restoration and await the next vehicles to be completed before being entered into service.	

== Carriages ==
=== Pre-grouping coaches ===
Origin	Number	Type	Notes	Photograph
LSWR	49 / 2296	6-Wheeled 5 Compartment Composite (Body Only)	Stored awaiting major restoration. Built in 1891, originally the carriage contained 1 second class compartment but was downgraded to third and numbered 2296 it was withdrawn in 1922 and arrived at the railway in 1983.	
LSWR	911 / 0695	6-Wheeled Third (Body Only)	Stored awaiting major restoration. Built in 1885, it was withdrawn in 1921 and arrived at the railway in 1976.	
LSWR	1512 / 4550	6-Wheeled 5 Compartment Second (Body Only)	Stored awaiting major restoration. Built in 1891, it was converted to third class in 1909, it was withdrawn and converted to a fruit van and renumbered 2296, it was finally with drawn in 1922 and arrived at the railway in 1983.	
LSWR	733	Inspection Saloon (Body Only)	Stored awaiting major restoration. The carriage was part of the LSWR F9 class called 'the Bug' due to its appearance.	
LSWR	74	Ironclad Third Corridor	Stored awaiting restoration off main site. Built in 1923, it ran with set 438 or 435 until withdrawal in 1959. It was then converted to breakdown staff van becoming no.70011 being modified losing its interior and double doors cut into the body side, it was finally withdrawn in 1988 before arriving at the railway in 2001, it is hoped to be restored to its departmental condition and work with the railways SR 45 ton steam crane.	

=== Maunsell coaches ===
The carriages designed by Richard Maunsell for the Southern Railway had a restrained elegance. In preservation terms, they provide a vintage experience for the passenger. For more information see SR Maunsell carriage.

Origin	Number	Type	Notes	Photograph
SR	6699	Brake Corridor Composite	Built in 1935. Awaiting Restoration. Restriction '4' originally in set 198 before going to set 619 in 1960, loose in 1963 withdrawn later that year. Converted to Push/Pull carriage in 1959, stored off main site, To form Push-Pull Set no.619 with 1323 when restored to working order.	
SR	6697	Brake Corridor Composite	Built in 1935. Awaiting restoration . Restriction '4' originally in set 196 before going to set 618 in 1960, loose in 1963 withdrawn later that year. Converted to Push/Pull carriage in 1959.	
SR	2768	Brake Third Corridor (Underframe Only)	Built in 1932. Awaiting rebuild of body. Restriction '4' originally in set 232 it was withdrawn in 1962.	
SR	1323	Open Third	Built in 1932. Awaiting Restoration. Restriction '4' originally loose before going to set 611 in 1960 withdrawn in 1964. Converted to Push/Pull carriage in 1959, stored off main site, To form Push-Pull Set No.619 with 6699 when restored to working order.	
SR	1381	Open Third	Built in 1930. Returned to service in June 2019 Restriction '4' originally loose it was withdrawn in 1961. Externally restored at Ramparts, Derby.	
SR	1346	Open Third	Built in 1933. Operational. Restriction '4' originally loose before going to set 269 in 1954, loose again in 1959 it was withdrawn in 1961. Restoration took place at Ramparts, the coach has now returned the railway. After fitting out the coach returned to service in October 2022.	

=== Bulleid carriages ===
Origin	Number	Type	Notes	Photograph
SR	1457	Open Third	Built in 1948. Awaiting restoration, currently used as stores / workshop for carriage restoration.	
SR	5761	Corridor Composite	Built in 1947. Operational, entered service in 2014.	
SR	4366	Semi-Open Brake Third	Built in 1948. Restoration has started now that 1346 has been released into traffic October 2022.	
SR	4365	Semi-Open Brake Third	Built in 1948. Now stored in Margate.	

=== Pullman cars ===
Origin	Number	Name	Type	Notes	Photograph
Pullman Car Company	14	-	Kitchen Third (Rebuilt as Observation Car)	Operational, Exported with the Flying Scotsman to the US in 1969 and repatriated in 2007. The coach was overhauled in 2022 and has now returned to service.	
Pullman Car Company	278	Bertha	Kitchen Composite	Operational, Originally a 6-PUL EMU, Stored away from the Railway at a private location	
Pullman Car Company	246	Lydia	Kitchen First	Operational, part of Winston Churchill's funeral train in 1965. Exported with the Flying Scotsman to the US in 1969 and repatriated in 2000. Relocated to West Somerset Railway in March 2017 pending investigation into work required for recommissioning into service.	
Pullman Car Company	247	Isle of Thanet	Parlour First	Operational, part of Winston Churchill's funeral train in 1965. Exported with the Flying Scotsman to the US in 1969 and repatriated in 2000. Stored away from the Railway at a private location.	

=== British Railways standard steam stock (Mk.I) ===
Origin	Number	Type	Notes	Photograph
BR	4416	Tourist Second Open	Operational, built in 1956.	
BR	4349	Tourist Second Open	Operational, built in 1956.	
BR	4983	Tourist Second Open	Operational, built in 1961.	
BR	9015	Brake Second Open	Operational, built 1955.	
BR	1947	Unclassed Restaurant Car	Operational, built in 1960, Used as Birds Nest Buffet in the museum siding at Corfe Castle railway station.	
BR	81410	Gangwayed Full Brake	Operational, built in 1957, painted in Crimson and Cream.	
BR	4842	Tourist Second Open	Operational, built in 1959.	
BR	4981	Tourist Second open	Operational, built in 1962.	
BR	4961	Tourist Second Open	Operational, built in 1962.	
BR	21205	Brake Corridor Composite	undergoing overhaul, built in 1958, it was painted in Crimson and Cream for the Wessex Belle dining train.	
BR	24127	Corridor Second (Now Disabled Vehicle)	stored on railway, but out of use. Built in 1951.	
BR	35059	Brake Corridor Second	Operational, built in 1956.	
BR	35464	Brake Corridor Second	Operational, built in 1963.	
BR	4945	Tourist Second Open	Operational, built in 1961.	
BR	1865	Restaurant Miniature Buffet	Stored, built in 1961, Used as Birds Nest Buffet at Norden Station, will close in November 2015 to allow a better line of sight for locomotives leaving the station.	
BR	1937	Unclassed Restaurant Car	Operational, built in 1959, painted in Crimson and Cream for the Wessex Belle Wine and Dine Trains.	
British Railways	4899	Tourist Second Open	Operational, built in 1959.	

=== British Railways standard stock (Mark 3) ===
Origin	Number	Type	Notes	Photograph
BR	10619	Mark 3a Convertible Sleeper	Stored, built in 1983, Used as sleeper car for volunteers spending the night at the railway.	

== Non-passenger coaching stock ==
Origin	Number	Type	Notes	Photograph
LMS	5291 / 44013	6-Wheel Milk Tank	Operational, built in 1929, part of the demonstration goods train.	
BR	87675	Blue Spot Fish Van	Operational, built in 1959, part of the demonstration goods train.	

== Goods wagons ==
=== Brake vans ===
Origin	Number	Type	Notes	Photograph
SR	360329	25ton "Pillbox" Brake Van	Operational, part of the demonstration goods train.	
SR	56400	25ton "Pillbox" Brake Van	Operational, part of the demonstration goods train.	

=== Covered goods vans ===
Origin	Number	Type	Notes	Photograph
SR	49445	Ventilated Goods Van	Operational, part of the demonstration goods train.	
LNER	775832	Non-Ventilated Goods Van	Operational, part of the demonstration goods train.	

=== Open goods wagons ===
Origin	Number	Type	Notes	Photograph
SR	37064	8 Plank Wagon	Operational, part of the demonstration goods train.	
BR	732027	5 Plank Tube Wagon	Operational, part of the demonstration goods train.	
SR	59342	8 Plank Wagon	Operational, part of the demonstration goods train.	
-	121	Match Wagon	Operational, part of Crane No.1 Set.	
-	128	Match Wagon	Operational, part of Crane No.2 Set.	
BR	740044	5 Plank Pipe Wagon	Operational, part of the demonstration goods train.	
SR	63002	Ling 4 Plank Wagon	Operational, part of the demonstration goods train.	

=== Flat wagons, bolster wagons and Rail and Sleeper wagons ===
Origin	Number	Type	Notes	Photograph
LNER	274569	Dolphin Bogie Flat Rail/Sleeper Wagon	Operational, part of the Permanent way train.	
BR	738836	Conflat L Container Flat	Operational, part of the demonstration goods train.	
SR	61095	Machinery Flat	Operational, part of Crane No.1 Set.	
BR	738507	Conflat L Container Flat	Operational, part of Crane No.2 Set.	

=== Ballast wagons ===
Origin	Number	Type	Notes	Photograph
BR	992784	Dogfish Steel Hopper	Operational, part of the Permanent way train.	
BR	978059	Turbot Bogie Steel Open	Operational, part of the Permanent way train.	
BR	972750	Rudd Ballast Wagon	Operational, part of the Permanent way train.	
BR	978683	Turbot Bogie Steel Open	Operational, part of the Permanent way train.	
BR	983030	Dogfish Steel Hopper	Operational, on loan.	
BR	992287	Dogfish Steel Hopper	Operational, on loan.	

=== Cranes and other special use wagons ===
Origin	Number	Type	Notes	Photograph
SR	CB5968	15t Stothert & Pitt Diesel Electric Crane	Operational, part of Crane No.1 Set.	
SR	3095	Crane Jib Runner	Operational, part of Crane No.3 Set.	
SR	CC1011	10t Stothert & Pitt Diesel Electric Crane	Operational, part of Crane No.2 Set.	
SR	95210	45t Steam Crane	Operational, part of Crane No.3 Set.	
