= SR West Country class 21C146 Braunton =

Preserved British steam locomotive

SR 21C146 / BR 34046 Braunton
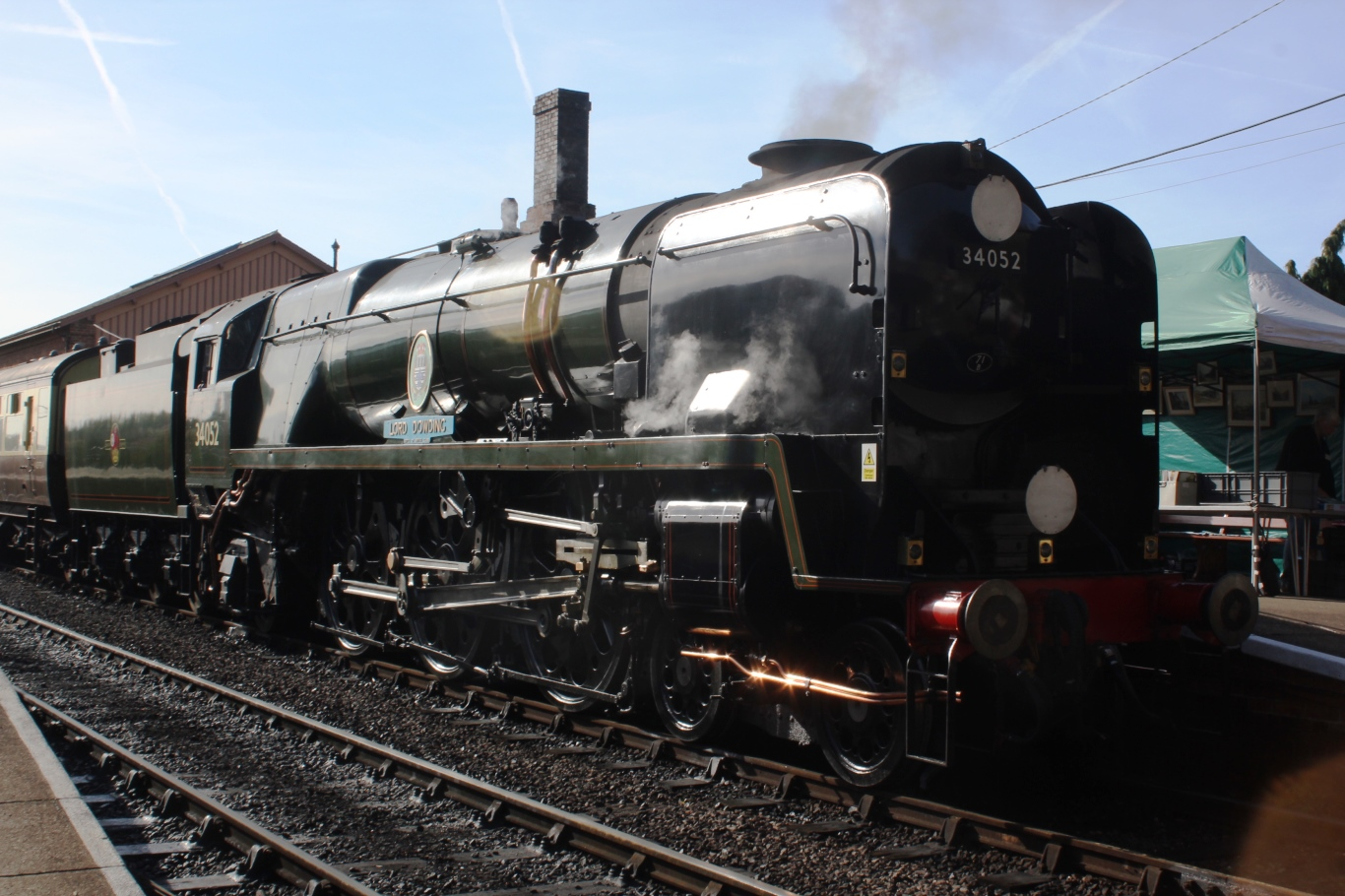
- SR 34052 Lord Dowding waiting to depart Bishops Lydeard for Minehead.
Type and origin
- Power type: Steam
- Designer: Oliver Bullied
- Builder: Brighton Works
- Build date: November 1946
Specifications
- Configuration
  - Whyte: 4-6-2
- Leading dia.: 3 ft 1 in (0.940 m)
- Driver dia.: 6 ft 2 in (1.880 m)
- Trailing dia.: 3 ft 7 in (1.092 m)
- Length: 67 ft 4.75 in (20.54 m)
- Loco weight: 91.16 long tons (92.6 t)
- Water cap.: 5,500 imp gal (25,000 L; 6,610 US gal)
- Boiler pressure: 250 psi (1.72 MPa)
- Cylinders: 3
- Cylinder size: 16.375 in × 24 in (416 mm × 610 mm)
- Loco brake: Vacuum (Air brakes also fitted)
Performance figures
- Maximum speed: 25mph - (heritage railways) 75mph - (mainline, restricted) 90mph - (mainline, unrestricted)
- Tractive effort: 31,046 lbf (138.10 kN), later 27,719 lbf (123.30 kN)
Career
- Operators: SR » BR
- Class: West Country
- Power class: BR (January 1949): 6MT; BR (December 1953): 7P5F; BR (November 1957): 7P6F
- Numbers: SR: 21C146; BR: 34046
- Official name: Braunton
- Delivered: November 1946
- Withdrawn: October 1965
- Restored: July 2007
- Current owner: Jeremy Hosking
- Disposition: Operational, Mainline Certified

21C146 Braunton is a Southern Railway West Country class 4-6-2 Pacific steam locomotive that has been preserved. It is presently based at Crewe Diesel TMD and operational on the mainline hauling excursion trains.

== Career ==
21C146 was built at Brighton Works in November 1946 in original streamlined form and upon completion was allocated to Exmouth Junction. Further allocations included Salisbury, Brighton and Bournemouth. In 1949 the engine was re-numbered to 34046 in the British Railways series.

In 1959 the engine was rebuilt. This included the removal of the air smoothed casing (which gave the engine a completely different shape) and the chain-driven valve gear was replaced with conventional Walschaerts valve gear. The engine was now allocated to Bournemouth from where it would have worked services between London Waterloo and Weymouth and over the Somerset & Dorset Line from Bath Green Park. Also in 1959, the engine hauled the Royal train to Portland. With steam on the Southern Region coming to an end, the engine was withdrawn from service in October 1965 and sold to Woodham Brothers scrapyard in Barry Island.

== Withdrawal and preservation ==
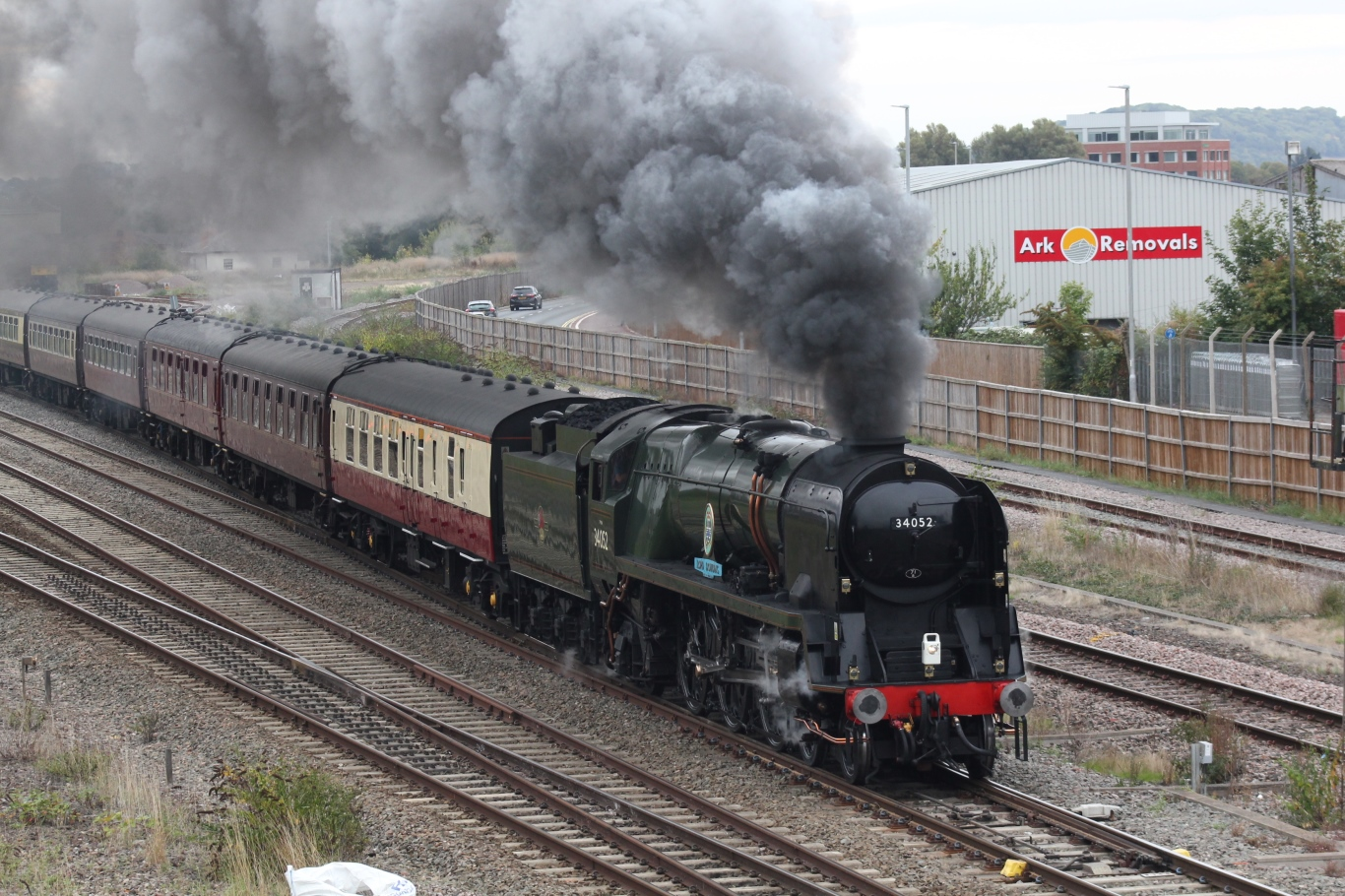
34046 disguised as 34052 "Lord Dowding" departing Taunton with an excursion to Par

34046 was withdrawn from service in October 1965 and moved to the Woodham Brothers' scrapyard at Barry Island, this was to be the engine's home for the next 23 years until it was moved in 1988 to Brighton in a bid to be restored.

In 1996 it was purchased by the West Somerset Railway but later sold on to a private individual. The engine was moved to Williton on the WSR where a long-term restoration to running order was to be undertaken. During the engine's time at Barry Scrapyard a large number of parts had been taken from the engine for use on other projects so replacements were cast and fitted. 34046 returned to steam in July 2007 for the first time in the 42 years since its withdrawal from service. The engine's debut return to passenger service was in 2008 with plans to have the engine certified for use on the mainline hauling excursion trains.

In 2018 it was based in Crewe and owned by Jeremy Hosking. 34046 is operational on the mainline hauling excursion trains. In 2016 the engine was disguised as scrapped classmate no 34052 Lord Dowding.

== Fame in preservation ==
On 15 May 2016 the engine hauled a private football special from Clapham Junction to Southampton for the fans of Crystal Palace F.C.
