= SR Battle of Britain class 21C153 Sir Keith Park =

SR 21C153 / BR 34053 Sir Keith Park
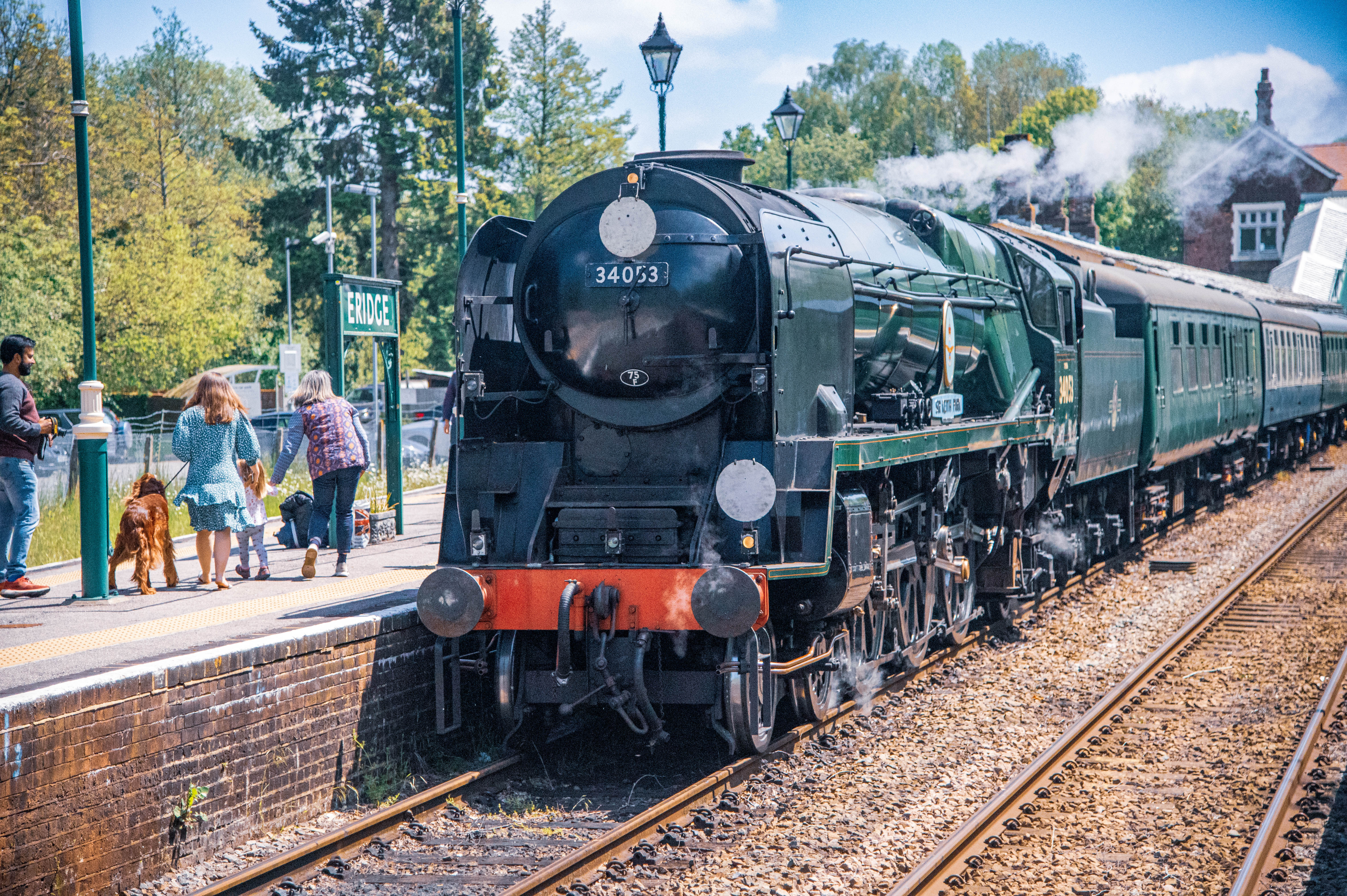
- SR 34053 Sir Keith Park at Eridge station on the Spa Valley Railway, May 2021.
Type and origin
- Power type: Steam
- Designer: Oliver Bullied
- Builder: Brighton Works
- Build date: January 1947
Specifications
- Configuration
  - Whyte: 4-6-2
- Leading dia.: 3 ft 1 in (0.940 m)
- Driver dia.: 6 ft 2 in (1.880 m)
- Trailing dia.: 3 ft 7 in (1.092 m)
- Length: 67 ft 4.75 in (20.54 m)
- Loco weight: 91.16 long tons (92.6 t)
- Water cap.: 5,500 imp gal (25,000 L; 6,610 US gal)
- Boiler pressure: 250 psi (1.72 MPa)
- Cylinders: 3
- Cylinder size: 16.375 in × 24 in (416 mm × 610 mm)
- Loco brake: Vacuum
Performance figures
- Maximum speed: 25mph - (heritage railways) 75mph - (mainline, restricted) 90mph - (mainline, unrestricted)
- Tractive effort: 31,046 lbf (138.10 kN), later 27,719 lbf (123.30 kN)
Career
- Operators: SR » BR
- Class: Battle of Britain
- Numbers: SR: 21C153; BR: 34053
- Official name: Sir Keith Park
- Delivered: January 1947
- Withdrawn: October 1965
- Restored: May 2012
- Current owner: Southern Locomotives Limited
- Disposition: In service

21C153 Sir Keith Park is a Southern Railway Battle of Britain class 4-6-2 Pacific steam locomotive that has been preserved. It became a permanent resident at the Spa Valley Railway in September 2020.

== Career ==
21C153 was built at Brighton Works in January 1947 and upon completion was allocated to Salisbury MPD. In addition to Salisbury, it spent considerable time on loan to Stewarts Lane depot in Battersea where it hauled the heavy "Continental Boat Expresses" as well as the Golden Arrow on many occasions. After a brief spell at Nine Elms and Exmouth Junction, it was returned to Salisbury in 1951.

When British Railways was formed in January 1948 it was given a new number - 34053. It was rebuilt in 1958, and in 1960, it was transferred to Bournemouth Depot where it worked the Pines Express on the Somerset & Dorset Line and it remained in Bournemouth for the remainder of its career with BR until October 1965 when it was withdrawn from service.

=== Naming ===
21C153/34053 was named by Air Vice-Marshal Park at Brighton station on 19 September 1947.

=== Modifications ===
In November 1958 it was taken into the works at Brighton and was given a complete rebuild. This included removing the air smoothed casing and giving it a complete new shape. Once its rebuild was completed it was returned to its home shed at Salisbury MPD.

== Withdrawal and Preservation ==
34053 was withdrawn from service in October 1965, and the following March it was towed to Barry scrapyard in South Wales. The arrival was delayed by over seven weeks following an incident where a set of connecting rods in 34053's tender struck a bridge near Chandler's Ford; 34053, alongside other Barry-bound engines, were stored for weeks until they were eventually towed to Barry Island where 34053 was to remain for over 18 years.

In 1979 it was purchased by Charles Timms for preservation, but it was not until June/July 1984 before 34053 departed from Barry Island as the 153rd loco to be rescued from Barry for preservation. It was moved from Barry to the former shed at Hull Dairycoates which it arrived at in November of the same year (it is unknown where she was stored between its departure from Barry Island and arrival at Hull). Minor work was undertaken at Hull with its wheels being sent to Swindon, but very little work was done to the boiler or chassis in the early days, and following the death of Charles Timms in 1992, it was later sold to Dr John F Kennedy and moved to Crewe in 1992 where a full mainline standard restoration was planned.

== Restoration ==
The plan that had been thought up for 34053 did not, however, work out, so in 1995 it was moved to Thingley Junction but once again very little work was done. 34053 was then purchased by Jeremy Hosking who planned to use the locomotive as a spares donor for fellow class member 34046 Braunton. Once 34053 arrived at the West Somerset Railway in January 1997, it was moved by rail from Bishops Lydeard to Williton where work then began on assessing it to see what parts would be in good enough condition to use on 34046. It was later discovered that the boiler (one of the original planned donor parts for 34046) was in much worse condition than expected and it was therefore decided that 34046 should use its own boiler rather than 34053's.

Eventually 34053 was purchased by Southern Locomotives Ltd and was then moved to their workshop at Sellindge where it arrived on 28 December 2000. After being moved once again to the workshops of South Coast Engineering on the Isle of Portland in Dorset after space issues arose in Sellindge, it was taken apart and so began the long job of restoring the locomotive to full working order. In late 2008, once fellow light Pacific 34070 Manston had left SLL's workshop at Herston, 34053 was transferred to Herston Works where its restoration was to continue.

Because the original tender had been lost during its time at Barry Island a brand new tender had to be built, as well as new tender wheelsets, tender frames, tank and all the other required pieces.

== Return to Steam ==
34053's restoration was completed in May 2012; however, because the originally intended home at the Swanage Railway had no use for the loco as they already had fellow SLL-based Bullied Pacific engines 34028 Eddystone and 34070 Manston both operational and running on the line, it was decided to base the loco for the foreseeable future at the Severn Valley Railway. Following weeks of testing and running on the line 34053, it entered service in August 2012.

On Sat 31 August 2013 a naming ceremony was held at Bridgnorth to re-dedicate the locomotive in honour of Sir Keith Park; the locomotive was recommissioned by the New Zealand High Commissioner Sir Lockwood Smith.

In August 2017 it was announced that Sir Keith Park would leave the SVR at the end of the year to return to service at Swanage. In September 2020 the locomotive moved to the Spa Valley Railway where it remained until the end of its boiler ticket in May 2022. The overhaul is planned to incorporate the boiler from classmate 34010 Sidmouth with an anticipated return to service at the Spa Valley Railway in 2023.

Presently 34053 is only able to operate on heritage railways.

== Fame in Preservation ==
On Friday 26 October 2012 the locomotive made a guest appearance in one of that years Children in Need events when it took part in a race between the Severn Valley Railway and the Morgan car company. The race started at Bridgnorth, Shropshire and both would race to Kidderminster, Worcestershire by road and rail respectively. Both called at intermediate stations along the Severn Valley Railway to collect tokens, & Sky Sports commentator Vicky Gomersall was on the footplate of 34053 while the car (a Morgan 3-Wheeler) was driven by Coronation Street actor Tony Hirst.

In the end, 34053 lost to the Morgan by 5 minutes, but the event managed to raise a large amount of money for Children in Need as the train was a sell-out at £20 per person. The event was shown on the BBC One's Children in Need evening on Friday 16 November 2012 (the event only being shown in the Midlands broadcast).

On 1 September 2024, the locomotive was renamed 303 Squadron for a period of one year at an event in Eridge, in order to commemorate the actions of Polish squadrons that fought in the Battle of Britain, supported by the Polish Air Force Memorial Trust based at Northolt. The choice of 34053 Sir Keith Park was particularly fitting given 303 Squadron was under his control, and flew Hurricanes.

== Gallery ==
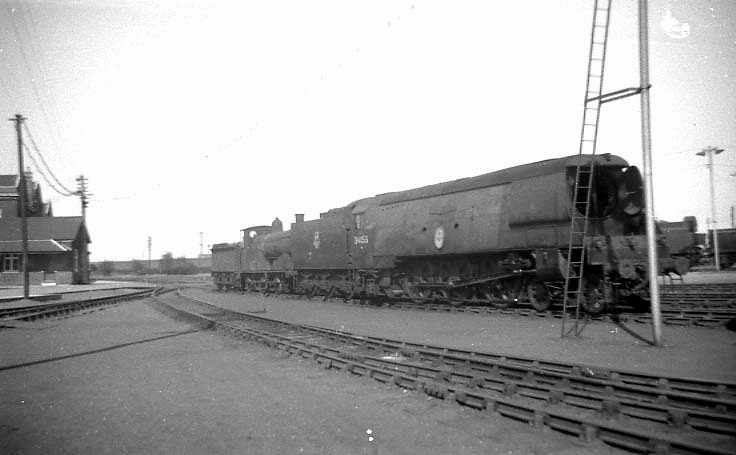
34053 in unrebuilt condition at Eastleigh works in 1958

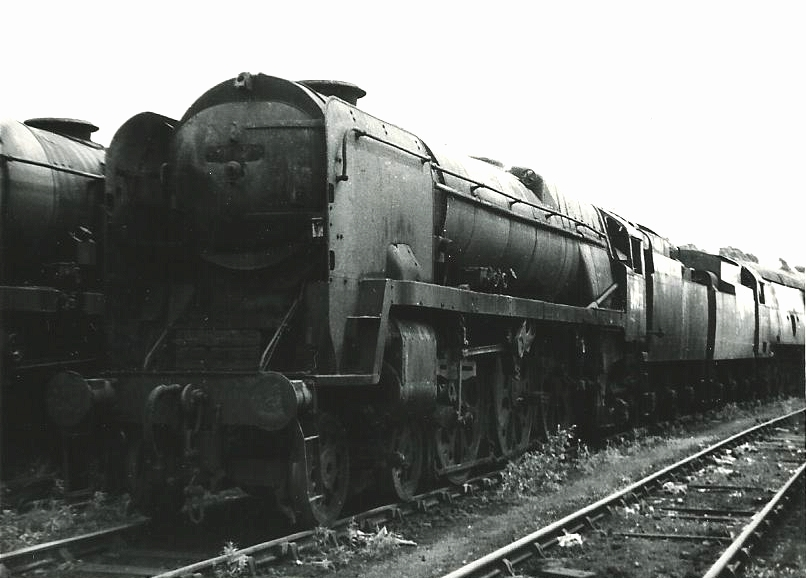
34053 in storage at Barry Island in July 1968

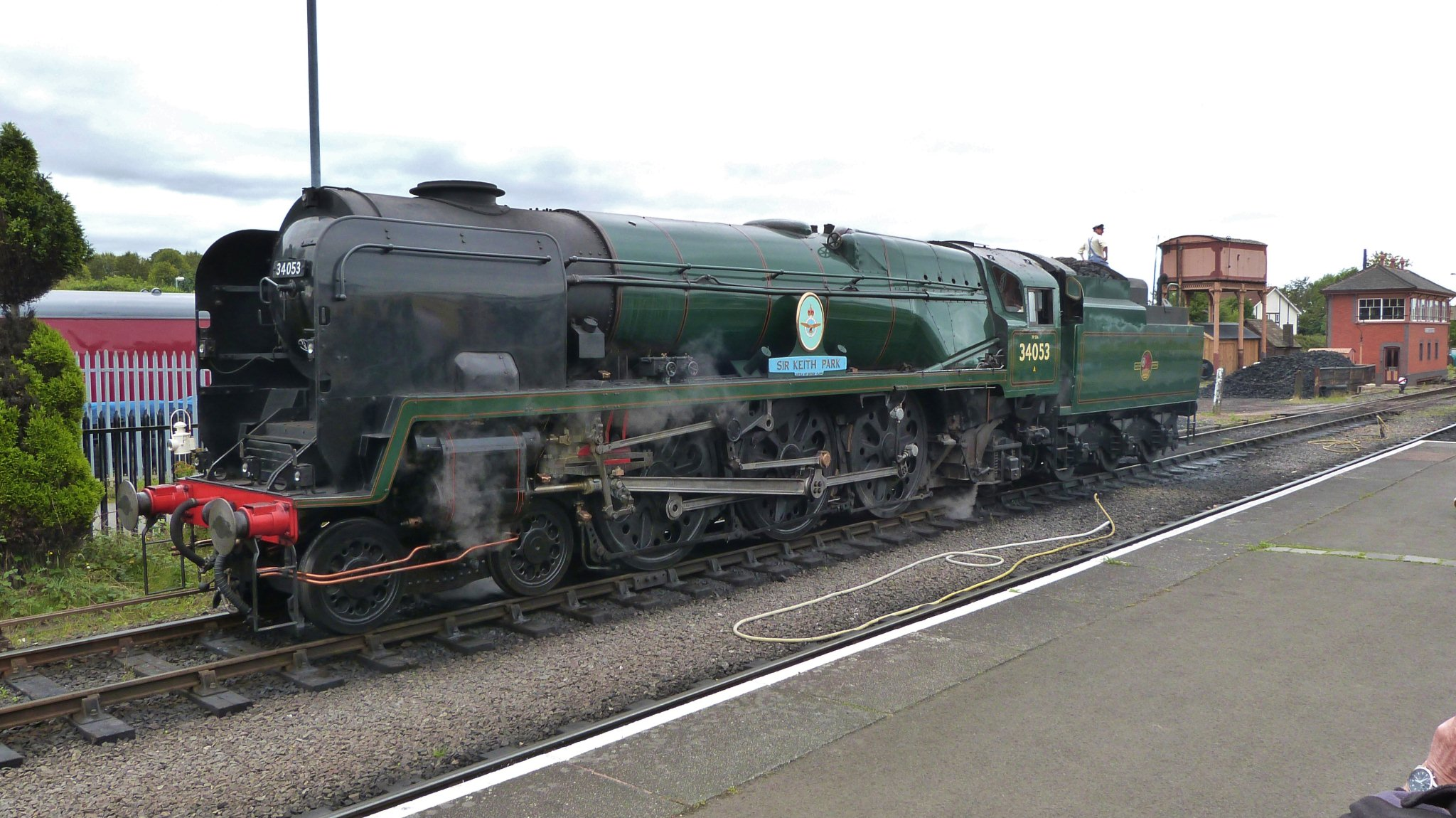
34053 Running round her train at Kidderminster in Sept 2013

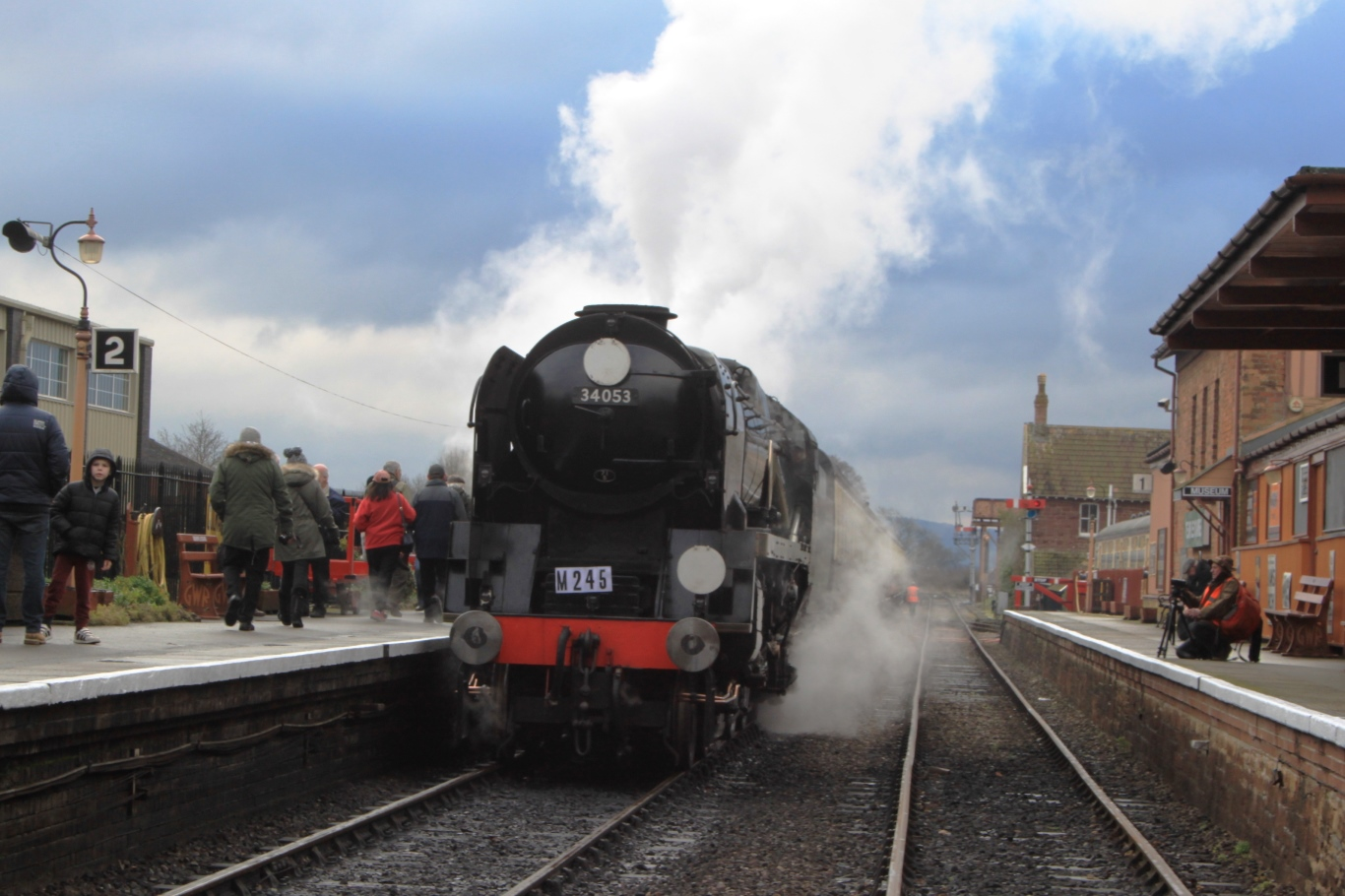
34053 waiting to depart from Bishops Lydeard with a train for Minehead in Mar 2016

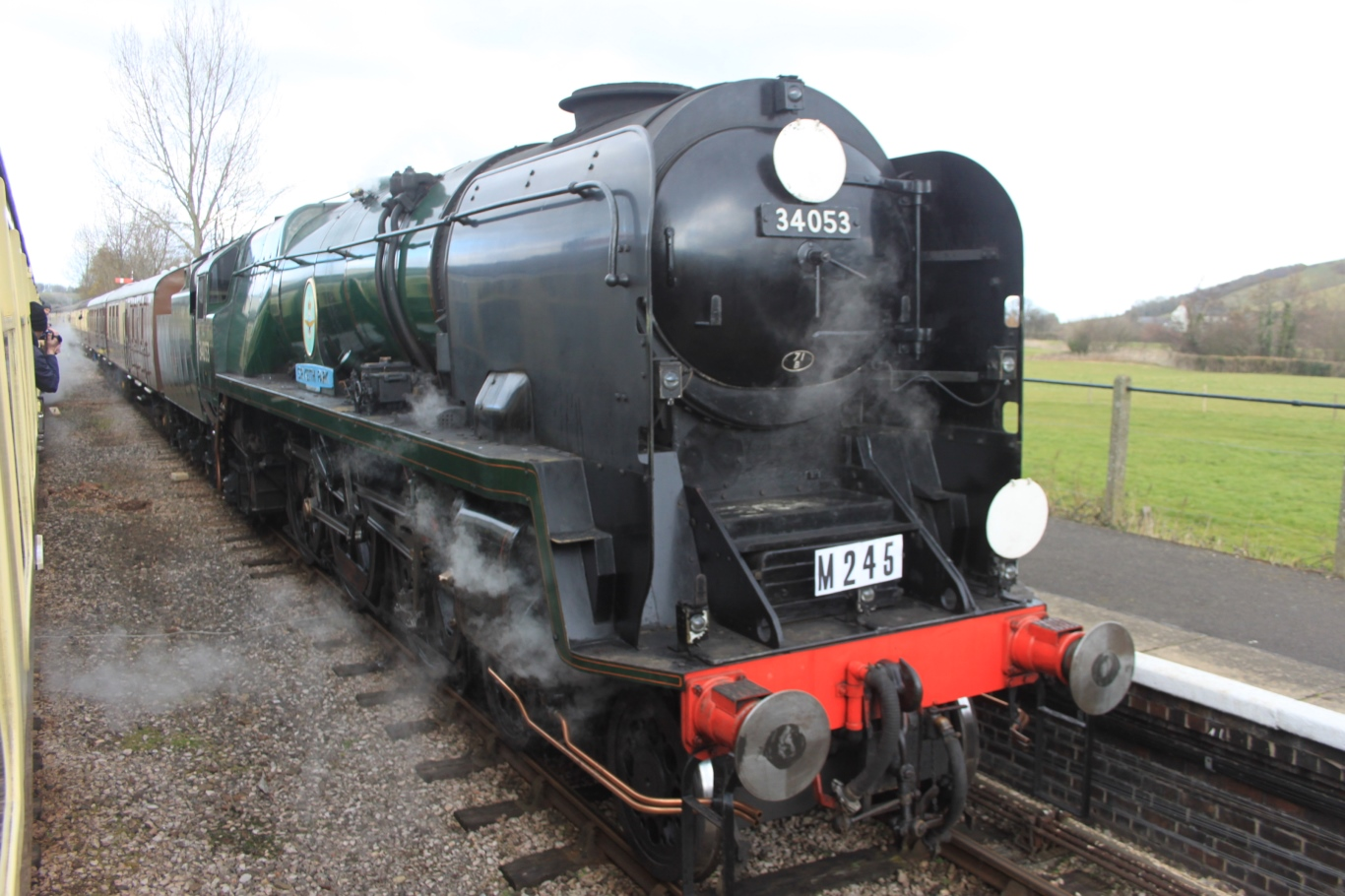
Arriving into Williton with a service to Bishops Lydeard during their Spring steam gala

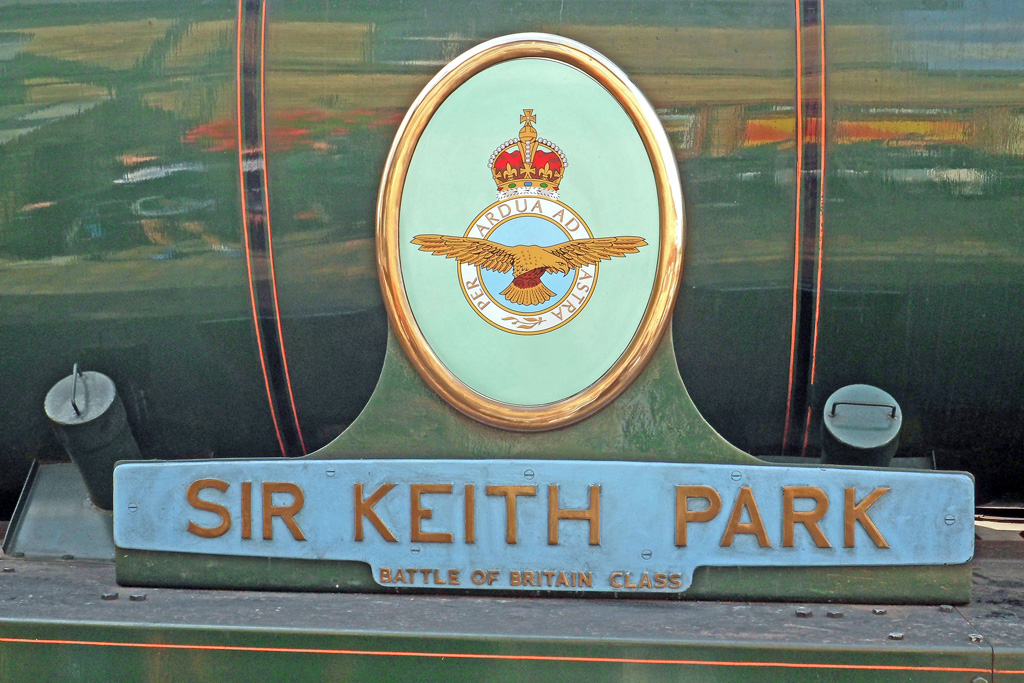
Closeup shot of Sir Keith Park's nameplate

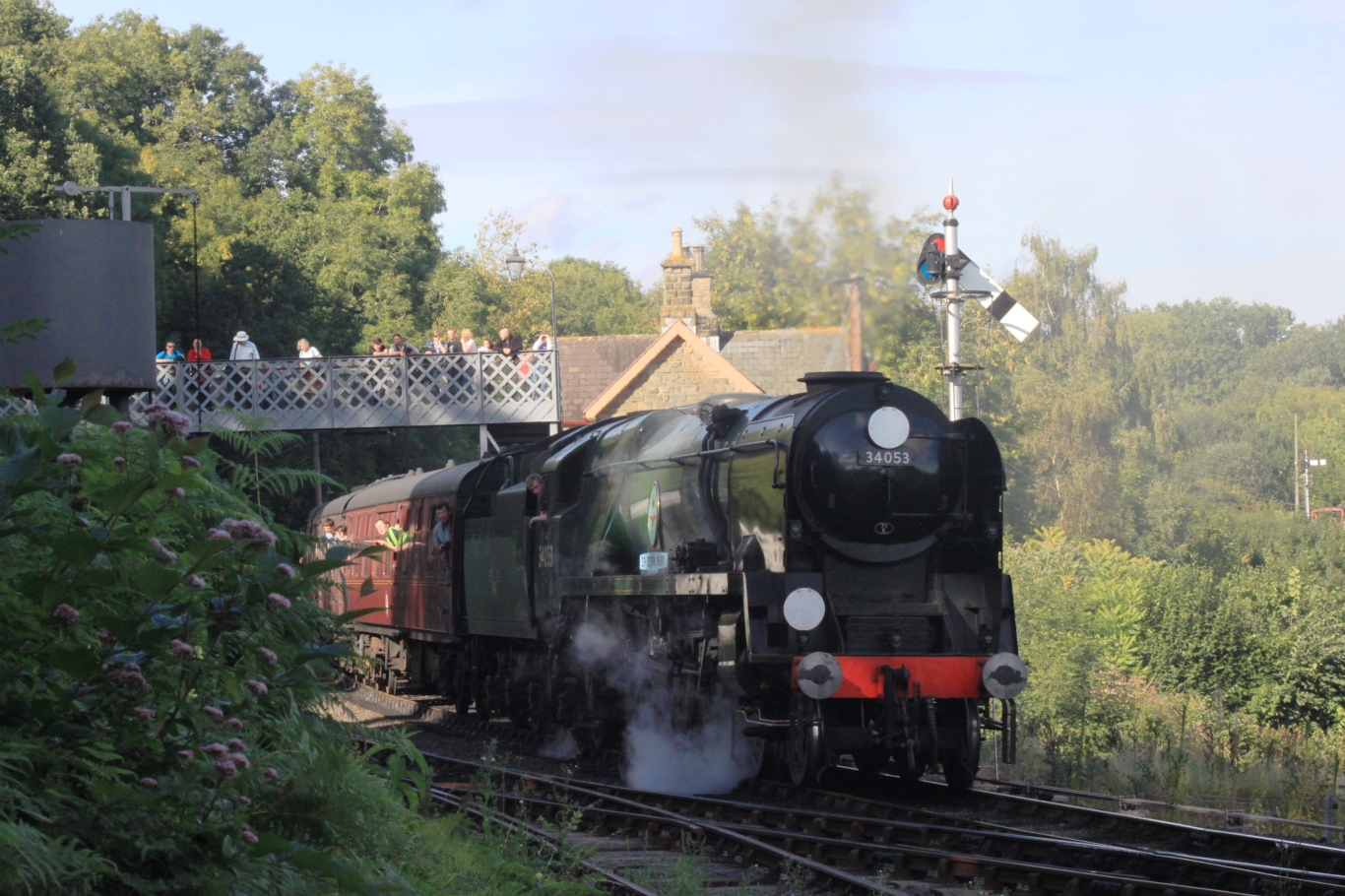
34053 departing Highley with a train for Kidderminster in Sept 2013
