= SR West Country and Battle of Britain classes =

Class of 110 three-cylinder 4-6-2 locomotives

SR unrebuilt West Country/Battle of Britain classes
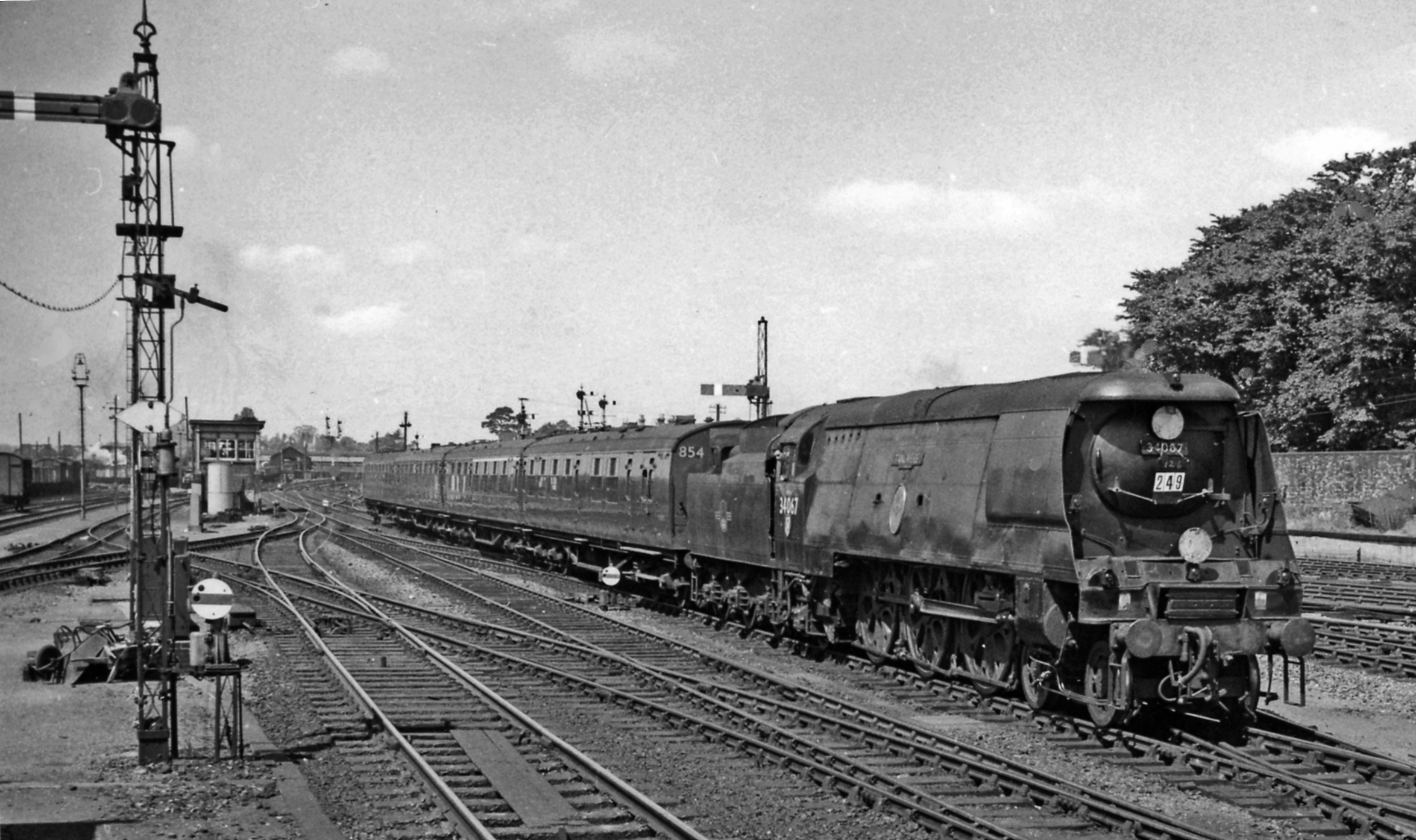
- Unrebuilt 34067 Tangmere at Salisbury in July 1963
Type and origin
- Power type: Steam
- Designer: Oliver Bulleid
- Builder: SR/BR Brighton Works (104); BR Eastleigh Works (6)
- Build date: 1945–1951
- Total produced: 110
Specifications
- Configuration
  - Whyte: 4-6-2
- Gauge: 4 ft 8 1/2 in (1,435 mm) standard gauge
- Leading dia.: 3 ft 1 in (0.940 m)
- Driver dia.: 6 ft 2 in (1.880 m)
- Trailing dia.: 3 ft 1 in (0.940 m)
- Length: 67 ft 4.75 in (20.54 m)
- Loco weight: 86 long tons (87.4 t; 96.3 short tons)
- Fuel type: Coal
- Fuel capacity: 5.00 long tons (5.1 t; 5.6 short tons)
- Water cap.: 4,500 imp gal (20,460 L; 5,400 US gal)
- Firebox
  - Grate area: 38.25 sq ft (3.55 m^{2})
- Boiler pressure: 280 psi (1.93 MPa)
- Cylinders: Three
- Cylinder size: 16.375 in × 24 in (416 mm × 610 mm)
Performance figures
- Tractive effort: 31,046 lbf (138.1 kN)
Career
- Operators: Southern Railway; British Railways (Southern Region)
- Class: SR / BR: Light Pacifics
- Power class: BR (January 1949): 6MT; BR (December 1953): 7P5F; BR (November 1957): 7P6F
- Numbers: SR: 21C101 – 21C170; BR: 34001–34110
- Nicknames: Light Pacific; Spam Can; Flat top
- Locale: Great Britain
- Withdrawn: 1963–1967
- Disposition: 60 rebuilt (see below); 10 preserved, 40 scrapped

The SR West Country and Battle of Britain classes, collectively known as Light Pacifics or informally as Spam Cans, or "flat tops", are air-smoothed 4-6-2 "Pacific" type steam locomotives designed for the Southern Railway by its Chief Mechanical Engineer Oliver Bulleid. Incorporating a number of new developments in British steam locomotive technology, they were amongst the first British designs to use welding in the construction process, and to use steel fireboxes, which meant that components could be more easily constructed under wartime austerity and post-war economy.

They were designed to be lighter in weight than their sister locomotives, the Merchant Navy class, to permit use on a wider variety of routes, including the south-west of England and the Kent coast. They were a mixed-traffic design, being equally adept at hauling passenger and freight trains, and were used on all types of services, frequently far below their capabilities. A total of 110 locomotives were constructed between 1945 and 1951, named after West Country resorts or Royal Air Force (R.A.F.) and other subjects associated with the Battle of Britain.

Due to problems with some of the new features, such as the Bulleid chain-driven valve gear, 60 locomotives were rebuilt by British Railways during the late 1950s. The results were similar to the rebuilt Merchant Navy class. The classes operated until July 1967, when all the last steam locomotives on the Southern Region were withdrawn. Although most were scrapped, 20 locomotives are preserved on heritage railways in Britain.

== Background ==
The financial success enjoyed by the Southern Railway during the 1930s was based on the completion of its London suburban electrification scheme in 1929 and the subsequent electrification of the main lines to Brighton and the Sussex Coast and to Guildford and Portsmouth. Despite electrification plans, the Southern Railway's less heavily used lines in the West Country beyond Salisbury did not merit the cost. Lines in Devon and Cornwall were meandering, heavily graded, and although heavy with summer holiday traffic were lightly used during the winter months. The seasonality of railway traffic meant that the West Country branches were worked by the ageing T9 class 4-4-0 and the versatile N class 2-6-0 (Maunsell 2-6-0s), which could be better utilised on mixed-traffic services elsewhere. As a result, an order was placed with Brighton railway works in April 1941 for 20 passenger locomotives of a type to be determined.

During 1943, Bulleid began planning for the post-war locomotive requirements of the railway and identified the need for a stop-gap steam locomotive design for those main lines in South East England scheduled for electrification, had the Second World War not taken place. Although the new Merchant Navy class was available for the heaviest Continental expresses, the resumption of frequent passenger services over poorly maintained infrastructure, following the war, would require a lighter locomotive with wider route availability.

At the same time, there would be a continuing need for fast freight locomotives, capable of operating on both electrified and non-electrified routes, without impeding the intensive use of the system by passenger trains. Suburban electrification used electric multiple units, which had no equivalent freight design. Although Bulleid built two prototype electric locomotives in 1941, these were, as yet, unproven, and freight haulage would be undertaken by steam traction for the foreseeable future.

== Design ==
The detailed design work for the new mixed-traffic locomotives was undertaken at Brighton railway works where they were scheduled to be constructed. The earliest drawings were for a moderately sized 2-6-0 with similarities to the London and North Eastern Railway K4 class, which Bulleid had helped design for the West Highland Line when he was Nigel Gresley's assistant. However, such a design would have been inadequate for the Kent Coast lines, which required a powerful 2-6-2 or 4-6-0 class. It is not clear why the design was subsequently enlarged to become a smaller version of the Merchant Navy class 4-6-2 as the likely traffic requirement did not warrant such lavish provision, but the incorporation of components from that class enabled standardisation during wartime production difficulties.

=== Weight reduction and reduced loading gauge ===
In order to improve on the route availability of the Merchant Navy class with its 21-ton axle loading, the weight was reduced by 5 tons. This allowed the design to operate on routes where the Maunsell 2-6-0s were the largest permitted and came mainly from several changes:

- reduced overall length
- smaller boiler
- more fabricated assemblies
- smaller tender (West Country only)

Also the cab was reduced in width and remodelled to comply with reduced loading gauge over some routes.

=== Bulleid's features ===
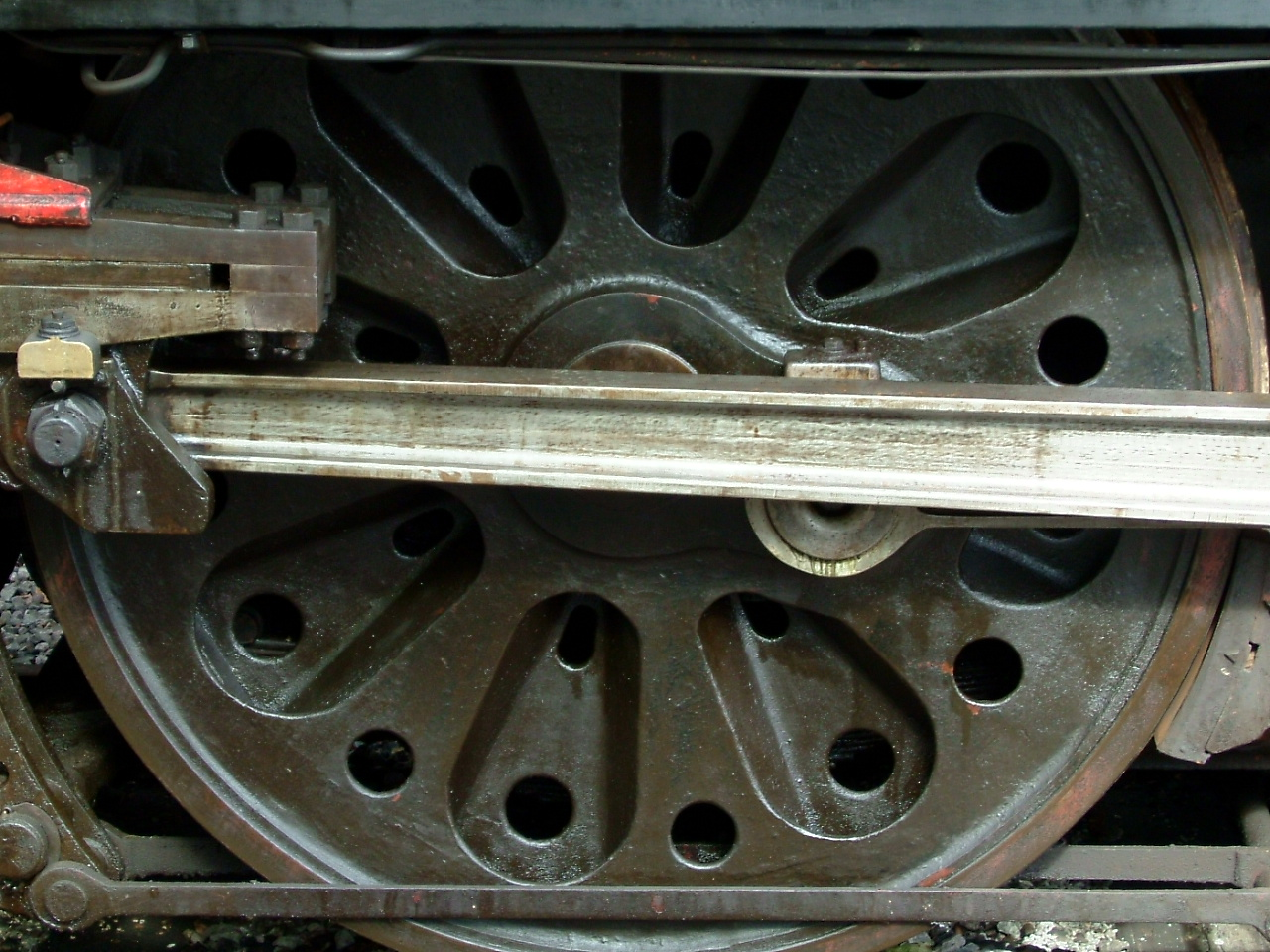
The distinctive Bulleid Firth Brown wheels, seen here on 34072 257 Squadron

Based on the mechanical experience gained from the Merchant Navy locomotives, Bulleid incorporated his chain-driven valve gear into what became the new design. This now-infamous component was unique in British locomotive design. It gained notoriety because it was difficult to access when things went wrong and, in tandem with the fast-moving Bulleid steam reverser, could cause irregular valve movements. The entire system was in a sealed oil bath, another unique design, that provided constant lubrication to the moving parts.

The locomotive also carried a similar "air-smoothed" casing to the Merchant Navy class. This was not regarded as streamlining by Bulleid, a fact demonstrated by the flat front end. Authorities differ as to the purpose of the casing. According to Creer it was intended to be an aid in cleaning the locomotive with carriage washers to reduce labour requirements during the post-war period, whereas Bradley asserts that the intention was to lift the steam and exhaust gases away from the cab. As with the Merchant Navies, the class soon gained the nickname "Spam Cans", due to the resemblance to the distinctive tin cans in which "SPAM" was sold.

The smokebox was an integral part of the air-smoothed casing, being a sheet metal fabrication to the same profile as the firebox that acted as a former to maintain the shape of the casing. In between, the casing was supported by channel-section steel crinolines (strengtheners used to maintain the shape) attached to the frames. The smokebox housed the five-nozzle Lemaître blastpipe arranged in a circle within a large-diameter chimney.

As with the Merchant Navy class, electric lighting was provided on both locomotive and footplate, powered by a steam-powered generator below the footplate. The gauges had fluorescent markings and were illuminated by ultra-violet light. This enabled clearer night-time vision of the boiler steam pressure gauge and the brake pipe vacuum pressure gauge whilst eliminating dazzle, making it easier for the crew to see signals along the track. Close attention was paid to the ergonomics of the cab, which was designed with the controls required for operation grouped according to the needs of both driver and fireman, thus promoting safe operation. As an aid to the fireman, a treadle used steam pressure to open the firehole doors, where the coal is shovelled into the firebox. The footplate was entirely enclosed, improving crew working conditions in winter. Other refinements and innovations used on the Merchant Navy class included steam-powered clasp brakes and the unusual 6 ft 2 in (1.88 m) Bulleid Firth Brown wheels (BFB).

=== Frames, boiler, cylinders ===
Compared with the Merchant Navy class, shorter overall length led to shorter frames and reduced the wheelbase to 35 ft 6 in (10.820 m).

The boiler was also shorter and of smaller diameter at the smokebox end, but retaining the 280 psi (1.93 MPa) operating pressure.

The inner and outer Belpaire firebox was also smaller than the Merchant Navy class also constructed using welded steel.

The cylinders were smaller at 16.375 in × 24 in (416 mm × 610 mm).

=== Tender ===
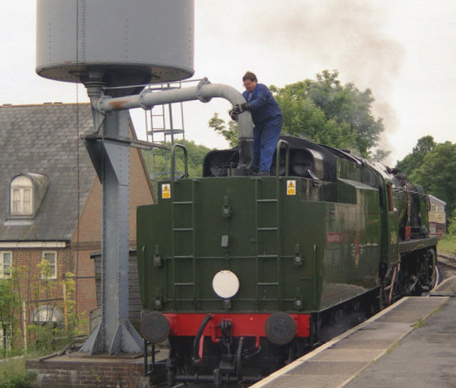
34016 Bodmin taking water at Alton

Bulleid designed a reduced capacity tender based upon the Merchant Navy version. It could carry 4,500 imp gal (20,460 L; 5,400 US gal) water and 5.00 long tons (5.1 t) of coal on a six-wheel underframe. It retained the BFB wheels and streamlining panels, or "raves", that gave the top of the tender a similar cross-sectional outline to carriages. As with the Merchant Navy class, the water tank was of welded sheet construction to save weight, and the tender was fitted with vacuum braking equipment of a clasp-type similar to that on the locomotive. Four train-brake vacuum reservoirs of cylindrical construction were grouped on the tank top, behind the coal space.

== Construction ==
The first batch of twenty locomotives was ordered in April 1941, although the changes in design to the Light Pacific arrangement meant that production was delayed until late 1944. Due to wartime contract work at Brighton works, the boilers were built under contract at the North British Locomotive Company. Before the first of the class had been delivered, the order was increased to thirty, with a second batch of ten ordered in September 1944. Deliveries from Brighton works began in May 1945 with prototype No. 21C101 Exeter, and proceeded at the rate of about two locomotives per month. The class was gradually run in on the Central Section until October 1945, when they were successfully trialled on Plymouth and Kentish services. By the time the first fifteen had entered traffic a further order of fifteen was placed, with these entering service between June and October 1946. From this batch onwards, traction was improved by the addition of steam sanding to the front driving wheel, with covers added to protect the motion from sand falling from the filler pipes.

A third batch of 25 was ordered and designated the Battle of Britain class. These were identical to the West Country class and the new designation was purely concerned with giving the locomotives names that befitted their intended allocation to the Eastern Section. By the time of the nationalisation of British Railways in January 1948, 70 Light Pacifics had been built at Brighton Works, with a fourth batch of twenty on order. There was a delay in production during the first three months of British Railways control but the last twenty ordered by the Southern Railway entered traffic between April 1948 and February 1949.

In March 1949, British Railways ordered a final 20 from Brighton works despite a pressing need for smaller tank locomotives. This imbalance was rectified by building forty-one examples of the LMS Fairburn 2-6-4T for the Southern Region. Also at this time Brighton works staff were embroiled in the difficulties associated with Bulleid's experimental and problematic Leader class. As a result, Brighton sought assistance from the other Southern Region works to complete this final order. Ashford Works cut the frames and constructed the tenders, and Eastleigh Works constructed six of the final batch of locomotives.

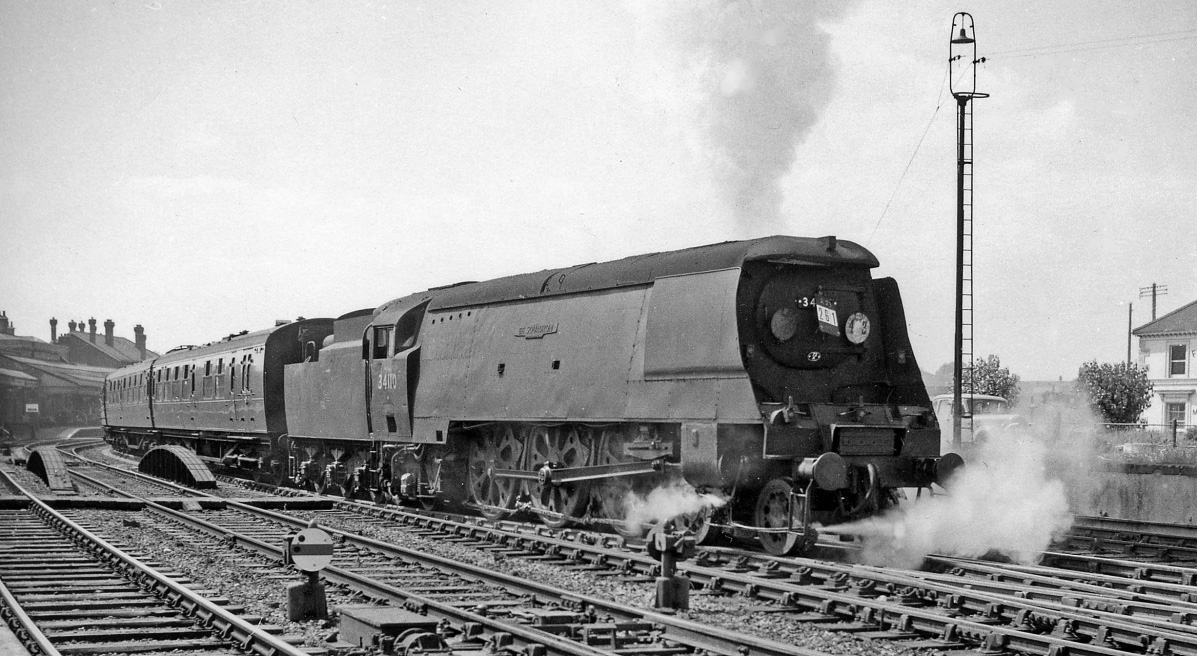
34110 66 Squadron, the last of the class built, leaving Salisbury in 1963

The completion of the final steam locomotive, No. 34110 66 Squadron, in January 1951 was delayed for several months pending consideration of proposals from British Railways management for a major modification to a standard two-cylinder design without the chain-driven valve gear, but the locomotive entered service as Bulleid intended.

=== Subsequent modifications ===
The first six locomotives were initially fitted with plywood sheeting over the cab-side windows as a wartime material-saving measure, with No. 21C107 Wadebridge the first to receive glass windows. Two of the front route indicator irons (of which there are five) were originally located on the smoke deflectors, which meant that the indicator discs stood proud of the casing. This necessitated a trial relocation to the smokebox door at the three and nine o'clock positions on No. 21C109 Lyme Regis, and fitted as standard from No. 21C118 Axminster onwards. The batch constructed between June and October 1946 received a modified steam regulator and LMS-style parallel buffer casings.

As with the Merchant Navy class, they were fitted with a new design of cab front spectacle plates from mid–1947 due to poor forward visibility. The small windows on the front face of the cab were redesigned to an angled profile, giving improved visibility to the driver. This was a feature fitted to all Bulleid-designed locomotives post-nationalisation. They were introduced in Britain in 1934 with the Gresley-designed Cock o' the North. Over the next decade the revised design was fitted to existing members of the class. Another modification was the reduction of boiler pressure to 250 psi (1.72 MPa) to reduce maintenance costs.

The Southern Railway-built batches had a narrow 8 ft 6 in (2.591 m) footplate due to the width-restricted Hastings line between Tonbridge and Hastings but these were never used on this duty and the cab was widened to 9 ft (2.743 m) on the British Railways batch. The tenders of Nos. 21C166–21C170 were fitted with TIA ("Traitement Integral Armand") chemical feed-water equipment that precipitated scale-forming constituents in the hard water of southern England into a non-adhesive mud that could be cleared using a manual "blow-down" valve. This equipment was retrospectively fitted to earlier members of the class. In 1948 the tender design was enlarged to provide a water capacity of 5,500-imperial-gallon (25,000 L; 6,610 US gal).

To ease maintenance and lubrication, panels of air-smoothed casing ahead of the cylinders were removed from 1952, and the front sanders were blanked off. This coincided with the removal of the tender "raves" on all but five locomotives, as they obstructed the packing of coal into the bunker and restricted the driver's view when reversing. The resultant "cut-down" tender included new, enclosed storage for fire-irons and glass spectacle plates to protect the crew from flying coal dust when running tender-first.

When the rebuilding programme (see below) was halted in 1961, further modifications were made to the unrebuilt locomotives. The most notable was on No. 34064 Fighter Command, which was fitted with a Giesl ejector in 1962 on the grounds that a desired spark arrestor would "suffocate" an ordinary blastpipe. Following some adjustment, the ejector improved smoke deflection and fuel consumption, allowing it to steam well with low-grade coal. As a consequence of the positive experience with No. 34064, preserved No. 34092 City of Wells was similarly fitted in the mid-1980s.

== Numbering and naming the locomotives ==
Bulleid employed the same idiosyncratic numbering scheme that he had used for the Merchant Navy class, beginning at No. 21C101 and reaching No. 21C170 at the same time of nationalisation. His scheme was abolished by British Railways, which renumbered existing these 34001-34070 and new locomotives 34071-34110.

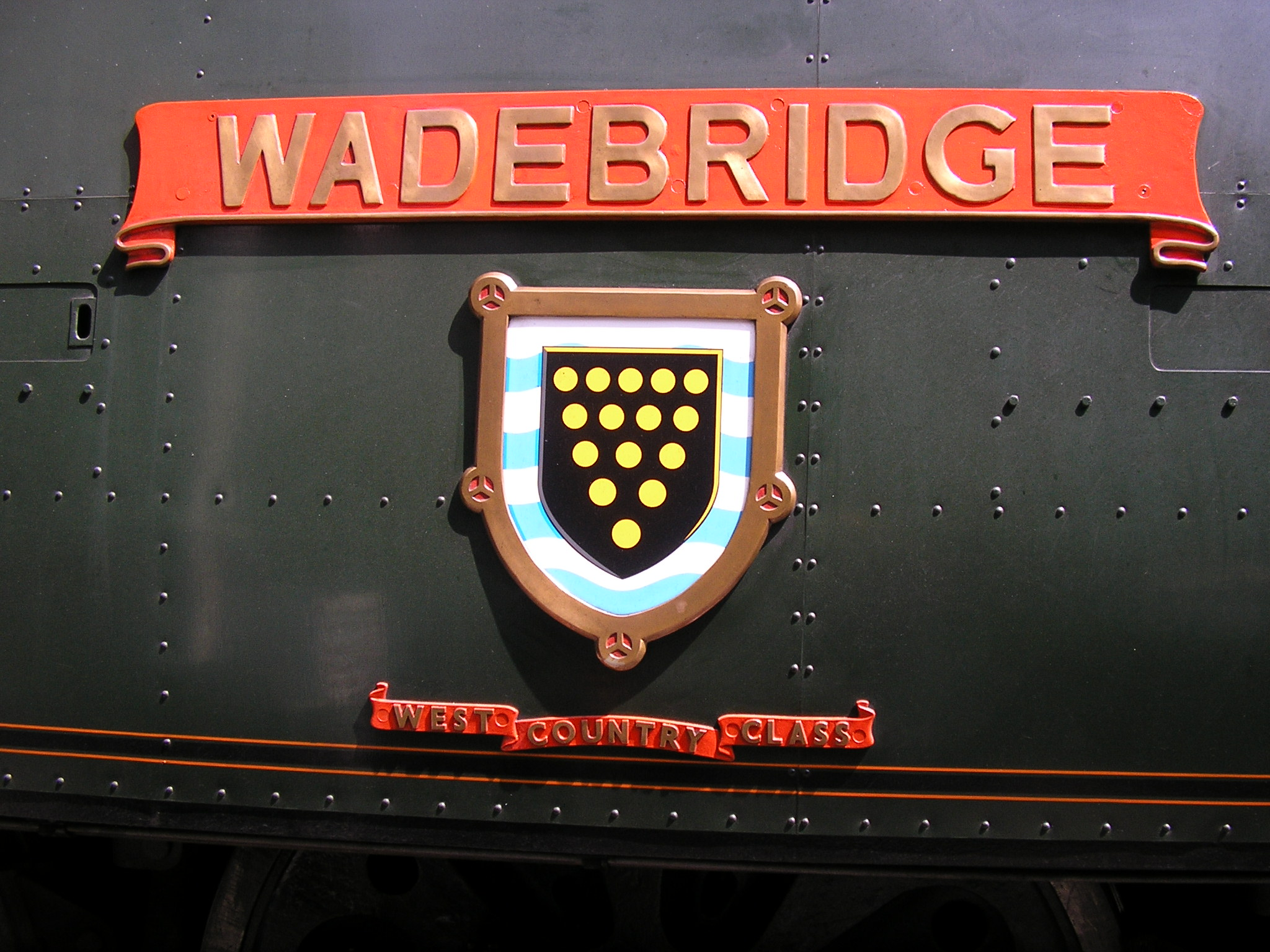
Nameplate configuration 1: West Country (34007 Wadebridge)

The first 48 members of the class were named after places in the West Country served by its trains or close to its lines. This represented a publicity success due to many of the locomotives being able to visit their namesake areas. Many 'West Country' locomotives sported an additional plaque with the coat of arms of the town or region the locomotive was named after. This plaque was mounted on the casing between the gunmetal locomotive nameplate and the West Country Class scroll, above the middle driving wheel. Several members of the class had only the nameplate and the "West Country Class" scroll, a gap being left where a crest would have been mounted. The background of the nameplate was usually painted red, though sometimes examples could be found in black if the locomotive works undertaking overhaul of the engine could not locate the correct colour paint.

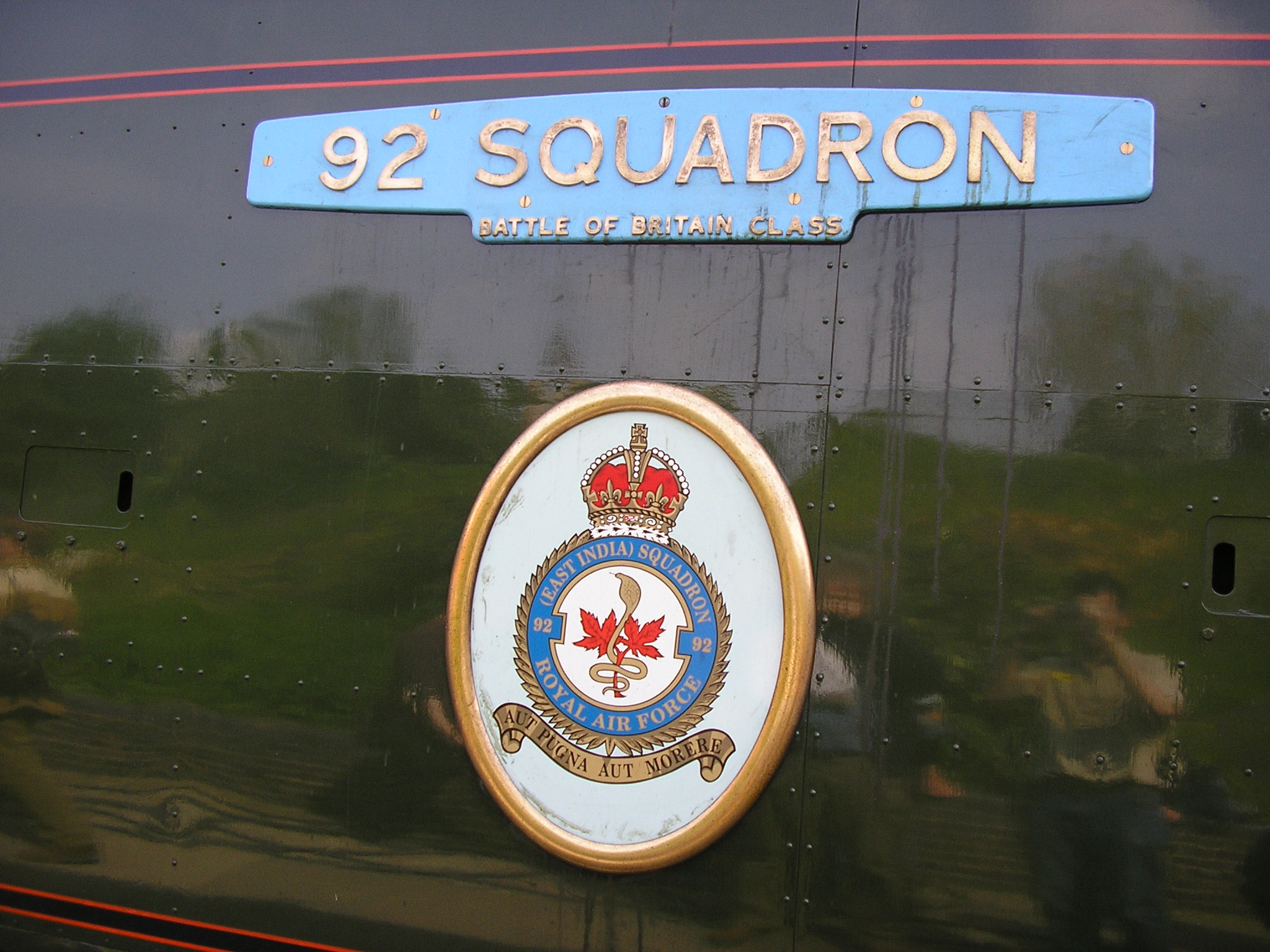
Nameplate configuration 2: Battle of Britain (34081 92 Squadron)

Once it became clear that the locomotives would be used further afield than the West Country, a decision was made to name the remainder after RAF squadrons, airfields, commanders and aircraft that had participated in the Battle of Britain over Kent, Surrey and Sussex. 'Battle of Britain' nameplates incorporated the name of the locomotive with the class name below, in a design that resembled the wings of an aircraft. This was painted Air Force blue, though other colours were sometimes substituted for the same reasons as above. An enamelled crest of the aircraft, personality or squadron was placed below the nameplate, in the same position as the West Country class equivalent.

The first locomotives constructed by British Railways were of the Battle of Britain class, but the naming policy reverted to the West Country for Nos. 34091–34108. The final two locomotives were Battle of Britain class, No. 34109 Sir Trafford Leigh-Mallory and No. 34110 66 Squadron. The result of the delay in completing was that the squadron crest for 66 Squadron was never made, as the manufacturer had retired during the intervening period. Thus 66 Squadron was the only Battle of Britain class member not to have a crest.

== Operational details ==
The original intention was to base the first batch of locomotives at Exmouth Junction depot at Exeter for use on the West of England Main Line to Salisbury and Plymouth, and secondary lines to Barnstaple, Bude and other holiday resorts in Devon and Cornwall. By the winter of 1945, there was a more pressing need for them on Kent Coast services. The class also began to be used on Continental Boat Trains to and from Dover and Folkestone once these were resumed in 1946. Later batches were used on cross-country services such as the Brighton to Bournemouth, Cardiff and Plymouth trains or the Somerset and Dorset Joint Railway trains from Bournemouth to Wells and Bath.

Because of the good route availability the locomotives could be used on non-electrified lines between London and Brighton. These included the Oxted Line, and occasionally the Bluebell Line between East Grinstead and Lewes, where they were also used for freight and parcels traffic, and excursion trains over electrified lines. Thus the original intention for the West Country class locomotives to work in South West England and the Battle of Britain class in Kent, Hampshire, Sussex and Surrey was never operationally practical and both classes were to be found all over the network. The most prominent journey undertaken by a member of the class occurred on 30 January 1965, when the funeral train of Winston Churchill was hauled by No.34051 Winston Churchill from Waterloo station to his final resting place, close to Blenheim Palace in Oxfordshire.

=== Performance of the unrebuilt locomotives ===
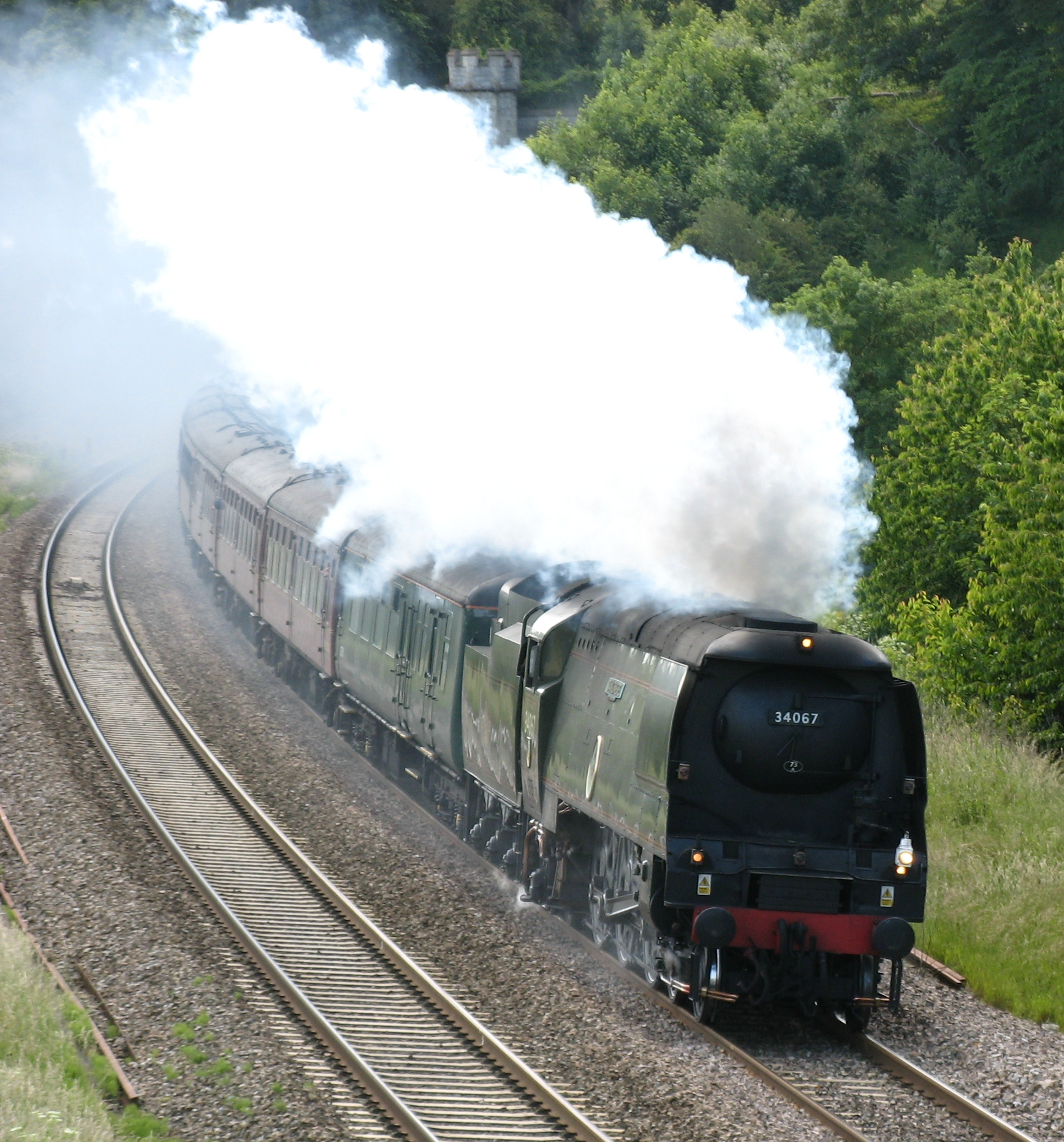
34067 Tangmere working a Poole-Cardiff charter train west of Bath on 11 June 2011

As with the Merchant Navy class, they could generate great power using mediocre quality fuel, due largely to Bulleid's excellent boiler. They also ran smoothly at high speed, but they were also beset with the same technical problems of their larger sisters. These may be summarised as follows:

- Adhesion problems. The lighter loading on their driving axles meant that they were even more prone to wheelslip than the Merchant Navy class, requiring very careful control when starting a heavy train. Once underway they were noted for their free running, excellent steam production and rapid turn of speed.
- Maintenance problems. The chain-driven valve gear proved to be expensive to maintain and subject to rapid wear. Leaks from the oil bath onto the wheels caused oil to splash onto the boiler lagging. Once saturated with oil, the lagging attracted coal dust and ash, which provided combustible material, and sparks from heavy braking would set the lagging on fire underneath the air-smoothed casing. The fires were also attributed to oil overflowing from axlebox lubricators onto the wheels when stationary, to be flung upwards into the boiler lagging in service. In either case, the local fire brigade would be called to put the fire out, with cold water coming into contact with the hot boiler causing stress to the casings. Many photographs show an un-rebuilt locomotive with warped casings, the result of a lagging fire.
- High fuel consumption. This was highlighted during the 1948 locomotive exchanges undertaken by British Railways, and very apparent at Exmouth Junction shed where the Light Pacifics burned 47.9 lb (21.73 kg) of coal per mile (13.5 kg/km) compared to 32 lb (14.51 kg) (9.02 kg/km) for the T9 class that they replaced.
- Restricted driver visibility due to the air-smoothed casing and soft steam exhaust from the multiple-jet blastpipe. The exhaust problem was never adequately resolved, and smoke continued to beat down onto the casing while moving, obscuring the driver's vision. There was much experimentation in order to resolve this problem, with varying degrees of success, and photographic evidence shows the many guises of this project.

== Accidents and incidents ==
- On 29 October 1959, locomotive No. 34020 Seaton was hauling a passenger train that overran signals and was derailed by trap points at St Denys, Hampshire.
- On 20 February 1960, locomotive No. 34084 253 Squadron was hauling a freight when it overran signals at Hither Green and was derailed, falling down an embankment and onto its side. The tender was recovered on 24 February and the locomotive on 28 February.
- On 12 December 1960, locomotive No. 34022 Exmoor was hauling a passenger train that overran signals and was derailed by trap points at St Denys. Two people were injured.
- On 11 April 1961, locomotive No. 34040 Crewkerne was in a head-on collision with an electric multiple unit at Waterloo station, London after the latter overran signals. One person was killed and fourteen were injured.
- On 2 September 1961, locomotive No. 34045 Ottery St Mary was derailed by trap points at Bournemouth Central, Hampshire.
- On 23 November 2013, locomotive No. 34067 Tangmere was hauling a passenger excursion when it suffered a mechanical failure whilst approaching Winchfield in Hampshire at about 40 mph (64 km/h). The right-hand valve gear connecting rod partly detached and dropped down onto the track. Some damage was done to the track but there were no injuries.
- On 7 March 2015, locomotive No. 34067 Tangmere was hauling a charter train that overran a signal at Wootton Bassett, Wiltshire. The train's operator, West Coast Railway Company was banned from running trains on the British railway network as a consequence of this incident.
- On 24 July 2017, locomotive No. 34070 Manston was involved in a collision with BR Standard Class 4 2-6-4T locomotive no 80104 outside Swanage station on the Swanage Railway. Nobody was injured in the incident but damage was caused to both locos.

=== Lewisham railway disaster ===
Restricted driver visibility was mentioned in the report on the disastrous Lewisham rail crash on 4 December 1957 outside St John's railway station, in which 90 people were killed and 173 injured. The driver of No. 34066 Spitfire had failed to see one yellow and one double-yellow "caution" signal in foggy conditions and was travelling too fast to stop when he saw a red signal, and the train crashed into the back of a stationary local train. Members of the class were later fitted with Automatic Warning System equipment, a recommendation of the incident report; fitting of trackside equipment was already underway, but priority had been given to routes equipped with semaphore signals, not electric "colour-light" signals as at Lewisham.

The report on the disaster indicated that it was necessary, with the signals concerned being on the right-hand side of the train and because of the limited visibility from the left-hand side of a steam locomotive, for either the fireman to observe those signals (but with the driver being responsible for asking him to do so) or for the driver to cross over the footplate from his left-hand driving position to observe them from the other side. In the event, the driver did neither, and neither driver nor fireman looked out for the aspect of the signals. The report ascribed blame to the driver, but recommended that the class be fitted with wider windscreens to improve visibility, noting that, in fog with less than 80 yards of visibility, the three signals involved would not be visible at all from the driver's side of the footplate; however, it noted that, even from a Schools class locomotive with its much smaller boiler, it was unlikely that these signals could have been seen from the driver's side in the dense foggy conditions of the incident. The report did not suggest that poor lifting of smoke obstructed visibility.

== Rebuilding ==
BR Rebuilt West Country/Battle of Britain classes
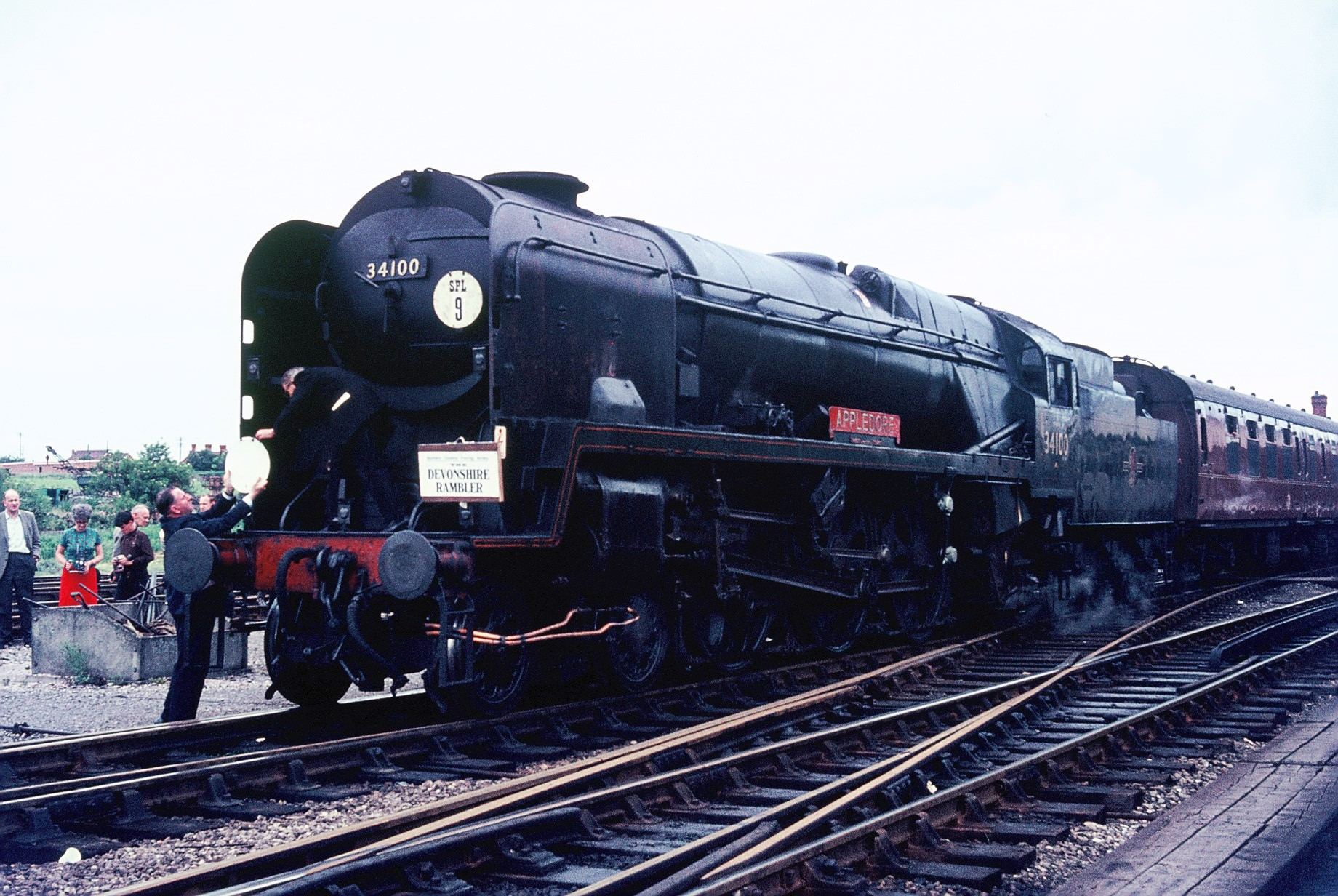
- Rebuilt 34100 Appledore at Westbury in June 1966
Type and origin
- Power type: Steam
- Designer: R. G. Jarvis (after Oliver Bulleid)
- Rebuilder: SR Brighton/Eastleigh Works
- Rebuild date: 1955–1961
- Number rebuilt: 60
Specifications
- Configuration
  - Whyte: 4-6-2 (Pacific)
- Gauge: 4 ft 8 1/2 in (1,435 mm)
- Leading dia.: 3 ft 1 in (0.940 m)
- Driver dia.: 6 ft 2 in (1.880 m)
- Trailing dia.: 3 ft 7 in (1.092 m)
- Length: 67 ft 4.75 in (20.54 m)
- Loco weight: 91.16 long tons (92.6 t)
- Fuel type: Coal
- Fuel capacity: 5.00 long tons (5.1 t)
- Water cap.: 5,200 imp gal (23,640 L; 6,240 US gal)
- Firebox
  - Grate area: 38.25 sq ft (3.55 m^{2})
- Boiler pressure: 250 psi (1.72 MPa)
- Cylinders: 3
- Cylinder size: 16.375 in × 24 in (416 mm × 610 mm)
Performance figures
- Tractive effort: 27,720 lbf (123.3 kN)
Career
- Operators: Southern Region of British Railways
- Class: BR: Rebuilt Light Pacifics
- Power class: BR (June 1957): 7P5F; BR (November 1961): 7P6F
- Locale: Great Britain
- Withdrawn: 1964–1967
- Disposition: 10 preserved, 50 scrapped

Due to the problems experienced with the class, and following the success of the rebuilt Merchant Navy class designed by R. G. Jarvis, British Railways ordered the rebuilding of sixty locomotives to a more conventional design at Eastleigh between 1957 and 1961. The first locomotive to be rebuilt was No. 34005 Barnstaple, which adopted many features from the BR 'Standard' locomotive classes. The casing was removed and replaced with conventional boiler cladding, boiler pressure reduced to 250 psi (1.72 MPa) and the chain-driven valve gear was replaced with modified Walschaerts valve gear fitted both outside as well as between the frames. The rapid onset of the 1955 Modernisation Plan during the early 1960s meant that the remaining fifty locomotives were not rebuilt, and continued in as-built condition until withdrawal.

=== Performance of the rebuilt locomotives ===
The rebuilding solved most of the maintenance problems whilst retaining the excellent features of the original design. Repair costs were reduced by up to 60%, and coal consumption was reduced by up to 8.4%. However the Walschaerts valve gear made the rebuilds heavier and prone to hammerblow on the track, a complaint that was not evident with the original design. The increased weight reduced their route availability, meaning that they could not be used on certain routes available to un-rebuilt examples, such as the line to Ilfracombe.

== Withdrawal ==
The electrification of the Chatham Main Line to Dover and Ramsgate in 1959 deprived the class of some of its work, as did the transfer of the lines west of Salisbury to the Western Region on 30 December 1962. This resulted in the withdrawal of several unrebuilt locomotives stabled at Exmouth Junction shed in June 1963. By the end of the year ten had been withdrawn, including the 12‑year-old No. 34110 66 Squadron, having travelled only 600,000 miles. Most of the unrebuilt locomotives were withdrawn over the next three years but seven survived until 1967 and the end of steam on the Southern Region. Many rebuilt locomotives were withdrawn soon after their rebuilding. The first was No. 34028 Eddystone in May 1964, having run only 287,000 miles since rebuilding. Other early withdrawals included No. 34109 Sir Trafford Leigh-Mallory which had only travelled 162,000 miles in the three and a half years since its rebuilding.

Table of withdrawals
Year	Quantity in service at start of year	Number withdrawn	Quantity withdrawn	Locomotive numbers
1963	110	10	10	34011/35/43/49/55/67-69/74, 34110
1964	100	29	39	34016/20/27-30/45/54/58/61-62/65/70/72-73/75/78/80-81/83/91-92/94/96/99, 34105-107/109
1965	71	16	55	34007/10/14/22/31/33/39/42/63/46/50-51/53/84-85, 34103
1966	55	18	73	34005/09/12/17/26/32/38/41/48/59/64/66/76/79/82/86/97, 34101
1967	37	37	110	34001-004/06/08/13/15/18-19/21/23-25/34/36-37/40/44/47/52/56-57/60/71/77/87-90/93/95/98, 34100/102/104/108

== Preservation ==
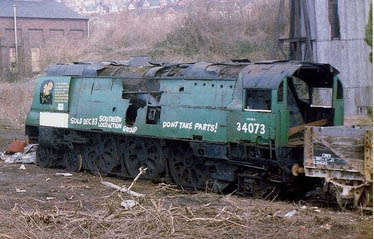
34073 249 Squadron at Woodhams' Scrapyard in 1984

Twenty Light Pacifics still exist, in varying states of preservation: two were acquired directly from BR for preservation, 34023 Blackmoor Vale & 34051 Winston Churchill; the other eighteen being purchased from Barry Scrapyard. Of these twenty class members to survive, ten are in original form, whilst ten are in "rebuilt" form. Had it not been for Woodham Brothers' scrapyard in Barry, South Wales, no rebuilt Light Pacifics would have been preserved. Eleven of the surviving engines are named after West Country locations in the South of England and the remaining nine after RAF Squadrons or significant persons, including Prime Minister Winston Churchill. All but one of the class in preservation were built at Brighton Works, the exception being 34101 Hartland which was built at Eastleigh Works. The class has proved to be useful for preservation societies, due to its good route availability and ample power, with some having returned to the main line to haul special trains. It is uncertain whether all of the preserved locomotives will be restored to working order; owing to the very poor condition some of them were in when purchased and the increasing cost of materials.

Other relics of both classes that have survived are nameplates, which were removed towards the end of steam on the British Railways Southern Region in the 1960s. As a result, many exist in private collections, and several have been seen at auction, selling for several thousands of pounds. A few members of this class were considered candidates for preservation, most notably No. 34086 219 Squadron and No. 34066 Spitfire but these plans never went through and were later scrapped.

Number BR	Number SR	Name	Builder	Livery	B.O.B. or W.C.	Type	Photograph	Current Location	Status	Notes
34007	21C107	Wadebridge	Brighton	BR Brunswick Green, Late Crest	West Country	Unrebuilt		Watercress Line	Under overhaul as of 2026	Undergoing assessment for an overhaul to mainline standards
34010	21C110	Sidmouth	Brighton	TBC	West Country	Rebuilt		Sellindge, Swanage Railway	Under Restoration	Being restored to mainline standards as 34028's eventual replacement.
34016	21C116	Bodmin	Brighton	BR Brunswick Green, Late Crest	West Country	Rebuilt		West Coast Railways Carnforth	Under overhaul to main line standards	
34023	21C123	Blackmoor Vale	Brighton	SR Malachite Green (Post War)	West Country	Unrebuilt		Bluebell Railway	Under Overhaul	
34027	21C127	Taw Valley	Brighton		West Country	Rebuilt		Severn Valley Railway	Under Overhaul	Withdrawn for intermediate overhaul in January 2024, completion expected for 2025.
34028	21C128	Eddystone	Brighton	BR Brunswick Green, Late Crest	West Country	Rebuilt		Swanage Railway	Operational, mainline certified	Mainline certified in 2025.
34039	21C139	Boscastle	Brighton	BR Brunswick Green, TBC	West Country	Rebuilt		Great Central Railway	Undergoing Overhaul	
34046	21C146	Braunton	Brighton	BR Brunswick Green, Late Crest	West Country	Rebuilt		Crewe Diesel TMD	Operational, main line certified	
34051	21C151	Winston Churchill	Brighton	BR Brunswick Green, Late Crest	Battle of Britain	Unrebuilt		National Railway Museum	Static display	
34053	21C153	Sir Keith Park	Brighton	BR Brunswick Green, Late Crest	Battle of Britain	Rebuilt		Spa Valley Railway	Operational	Temporarily renamed 303 Squadron in 2024. Renamed back to Sir Keith Park in 2025.
34058	21C158	Sir Frederick Pile	Brighton	TBC	Battle of Britain	Rebuilt		Sellindge, Swanage Railway	Under Restoration	
34059	21C159	Sir Archibald Sinclair	Brighton	BR Brunswick Green, Late Crest	Battle of Britain	Rebuilt		Bluebell Railway	Operational	
34067	21C167	Tangmere	Brighton	BR Brunswick Green, Late Crest	Battle of Britain	Unrebuilt		West Coast Railways Carnforth	Operational, main line certified.	
34070	21C170	Manston	Brighton	BR Brunswick Green, Late Crest	Battle of Britain	Unrebuilt		Swanage Railway	Operational	
34072		257 Squadron	Brighton	BR Brunswick Green, Late Crest	Battle of Britain	Unrebuilt		Swanage Railway	Operational	Returned to Swanage Railway from Spa Valley Railway as replacement resident for 34028 Eddystone.
34073		249 Squadron	Brighton	N/A	Battle of Britain	Unrebuilt		West Coast Railways Carnforth	Stored	Acting as a donor loco to 34067
34081		92 Squadron	Brighton	SR Malachite Green, British Railways Lettering	Battle of Britain	Unrebuilt		East Lancashire Railway	Operational	Moved from the Nene Valley Railway in 2024
34092		City of Wells	Brighton	BR Brunswick Green, Early Crest	West Country	Unrebuilt		East Lancashire Railway	Operational	Recently returned to service from a short overhaul. Fitted with Giesl ejector
34101		Hartland	Eastleigh	BR Brunswick Green, Late Crest	West Country	Rebuilt		North Yorkshire Moors Railway	Undergoing overhaul	
34105		Swanage	Brighton	BR Brunswick Green, TBD	West Country	Unrebuilt		Mid Hants Railway	Undergoing overhaul	

== Livery and numbering ==
=== Southern Railway ===
The class's livery was Southern Railway malachite green with "Sunshine yellow" horizontal lining. A circular cast brass plate with a red background on the smokebox door featured the word "Southern" and the date of manufacture. Bulleid advocated a continental style of numbering, basing this upon his experiences at the French branch of Westinghouse Electric before the First World War, and his tenure in the Railway Operating Division (R.O.D.) during that conflict. The Southern Railway number adapted the UIC classification system where "2" and "1" refer to the number of un-powered leading and trailing axles respectively, and "C" refers to the number of driving axles, in this case three. However, since "21C" was the prefix already used by the Merchant Navy class, the suffix "1" was added; these locomotives carried numbers that started "21C1" followed by the individual two-digit identifier.

=== British Railways ===
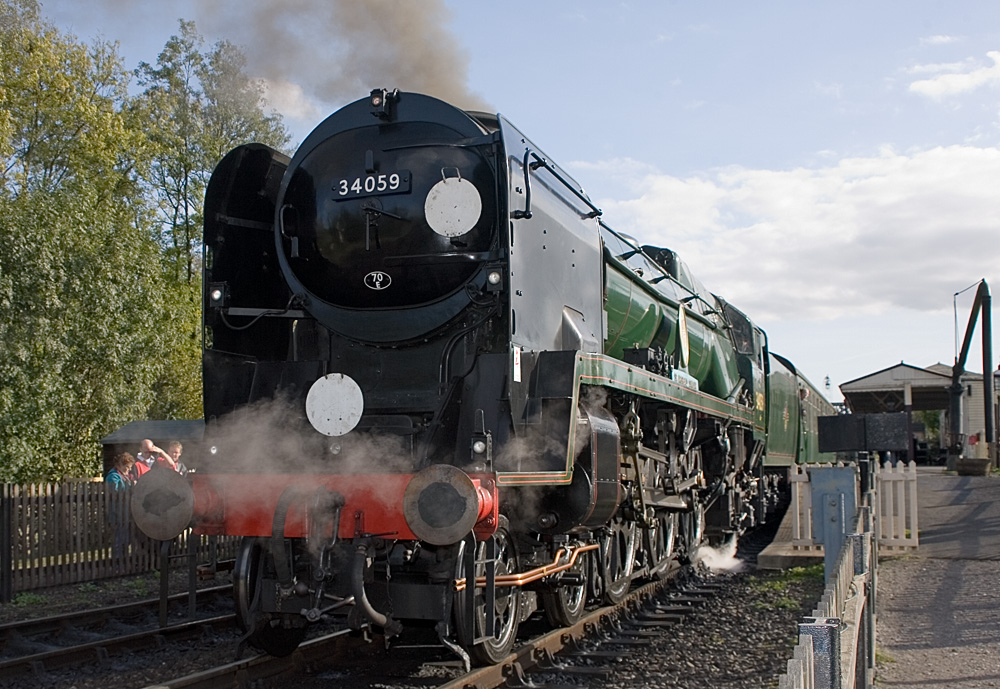
Rebuilt Battle of Britain class 34059 Sir Archibald Sinclair, restored and running on the Bluebell Railway, pictured in Sheffield Park station, Sussex October 2009

Initial livery after nationalisation in 1948 was British Railways malachite green and "Sunshine yellow" lining and lettering, with British Railways on the tender. No. 34090 Sir Eustace Missenden, Southern Railway was given commemorative malachite green livery that included green-painted wheels with yellow rims and the early British Railways crest on the tender. The Bulleid numbering system was temporarily retained on the first seventy locomotives with the addition of an "s" prefix (e.g. s21C101). The classes were given several power classifications in their careers, beginning with 6MT (Mixed Traffic) in 1949. In December 1953 they were reclassified 7P 5FA, the "A" denoting brake power when used on unfitted (non-vacuum braked) goods trains. The rebuilt locomotives retained this classification until all received the classification of 7P6F between November 1957 and November 1961.

The locomotives were turned out in British Railways Brunswick green livery with orange and black lining with the British Railways crest on the tender side, after their first overhaul under new ownership. This was unlike the Merchant Navy class, which was initially turned out in British Railways experimental express passenger blue livery. By this stage, the Southern Railway-built locomotives were re-liveried and renumbered from 34001–34070. The rebuilt locomotives were also in British Railways Brunswick green with orange and black lining, and crest on the tender side, whilst the nameplates were placed on a custom-made mounting on the running plate due to the absence of a flat surface.

Some of the locomotives had additional embellishments. No. 34050 Royal Observer Corps was presented with an ROC long-service medal in July 1961. The ceremony took place at Waterloo station, and included Commandant ROC Air Commodore Wight-Boycott. The cab side was given a representation of the medal and its ribbon, which was displayed until the engine was withdrawn from service and scrapped in the late 1960s. The original nameplate and crest were recovered and displayed in the entrance hall of ROC Headquarters at RAF Bentley Priory until 1996 when they were transferred to the RAF Museum at Hendon. Another locomotive that featured a second crest was 34067 Tangmere, which was given the airfield's crest for the cab side, as it did not feature on the nameplate crest.

== Operational assessment ==
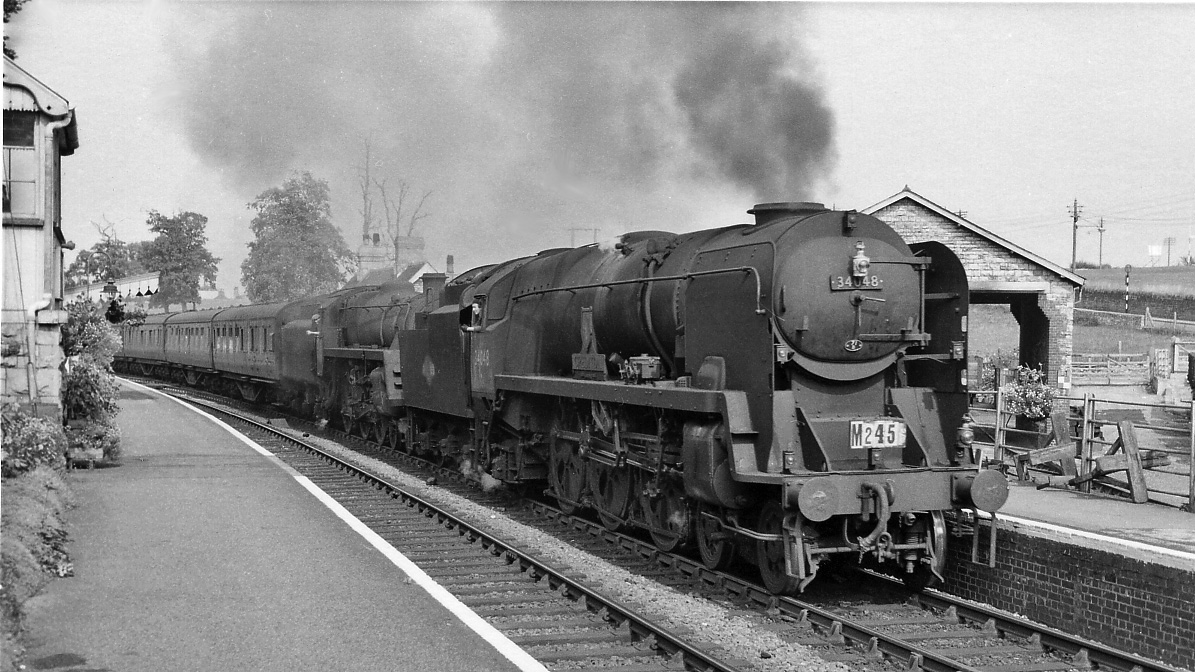
Rebuilt 34048 Crediton leading a double-headed Summer Saturday holiday express on the heavy gradients of the Somerset and Dorset Joint Railway in 1959

The class in both unrebuilt and rebuilt forms has been the subject of divergent opinions. The use of welded steel construction and the various innovations that had not previously been seen in British locomotive design meant that the class earned Bulleid the title "Last Giant of Steam". The steam-raising ability of their boilers represented an advance in British steam technology. Their light axle-loading also meant widespread use over the Southern network, and they were capable of fast running.

Despite these successes, the number of innovations introduced at the same time made the class unreliable and difficult to maintain. A great deal of money was wasted on resolving the problems of a class designed for duties that could have been undertaken by cheaper 2-6-2 or 4-6-0 mixed-traffic locomotives. Likewise, more Light Pacifics were built than were needed, frequently undertaking tasks that would usually befit a much smaller locomotive. A curious but common sight west of Exeter during the winter months was a Light Pacific hauling a local stopping service with a single carriage to destinations as diverse as Padstow and Wadebridge. Finally, too much money was spent on the expensive rebuilding programme when dieselisation and modernisation meant the locomotives would have very limited lives in their new guise.

== Models ==
Kitmaster produced an unpowered polystyrene injection-moulded kit for 00 gauge from 1960. In late 1962, the brand was sold to Airfix, which resumed production in 1968. The moulds later passed to Dapol, which continues to produce the kit.

== See also ==
- Southern Locomotives Ltd – owners of 34070 Manston, 34072 257 Squadron, 34053 Sir Keith Park, 34010 Sidmouth and 34028 Eddystone.

=== External links ===
- Southern E-group (1) – un-rebuilt 'Light Pacifics'
- Southern E-group (2) – rebuilt 'Light Pacifics'
- Bulleid Society: WC/BB locomotive summary – Table showing key dates, mileages, running numbers, etc. for all class members
