= Southern Locomotives Ltd =

British railway preservation organisation

Southern Locomotives Ltd is a not for profit organisation that restores, maintains and runs steam locomotives. It is based at Herston, Swanage, Dorset.

== Locomotives ==
Number	Class	Built	Rebuilt	Withdrawn	Status	Current Location	Photograph	Notes
34010 Sidmouth	SR West Country class 4-6-2	Sept 1945	Feb 1959	Mar 1965	Under Restoration	Sellindge, Kent		Being restored from scrapyard condition. Previously planned to be restored to mainline condition to replace Eddystone on expiry of it's boiler ticket, but now planned to be restored for preservation use only with allowance made for mainline upgrades in the future.
34028 Eddystone	SR West Country class 4-6-2	Apr 1946	Aug 1957	May 1964	Operational	Southall Railway Centre		Returned to service in May 2021 after a 10-year overhaul. Boiler Ticket Expires: 2031. Started mainline operations in late 2025.
34053 Sir Keith Park	SR Battle of Britain class 4-6-2	Jan 1947	Nov 1958	Oct 1965	Operational	Spa Valley Railway		Moved from its previous base at the Severn Valley Railway to the Swanage Railway in January 2018. Under overhaul at Herston Works, Swanage Railway as of December 2022, Operation at the Spa Valley Railway as of September 2024. Temporarily renamed to 303 Squadron but returned to original name in September 2025.
34058 Sir Frederick Pile	SR Battle of Britain class 4-6-2	Apr 1947	Nov 1960	Oct 1964	Under restoration	Sellindge, Kent		Transferred from Mid Hants Railway late 2023
34070 Manston	SR Battle of Britain class 4-6-2	Nov 1947	-	Aug 1964	Operational	Swanage Railway		Overhauled after repairs to front end following low speed collision with 80104 on Swanage Railway in 2017. Completed in 2022
34072 257 Squadron	SR Battle of Britain class 4-6-2	Apr 1948	-	Jun 1964	Operational	Swanage Railway		Recently returned to service following the completion of its recent overhaul. Boiler Ticket Expires: 2027. Announced 5th December 2022 that it would stay based at Spa Valley Railway, after being brought in for the Polar Express. Transferred to the Mid Hants Railway in July 2024. Returned to Swanage Railway as of March 2025.
80104	BR Standard 4 2-6-4T	Mar 1955	N/A	Jul 1965	Under Overhaul	Swanage Railway		Boiler ticket expired May 2021. Under overhaul at Herston Works, Swanage Railway as of August 2026
WD5050; Norman	Hunslet Austerity 0-6-0ST	1943	N/A	-	Under Overhaul	Sellindge, Kent		Robert Stephenson and Hawthorns Ltd. Works No. 7086. Under overhaul at Sellindge as of August 2026

== Locomotives sold by Southern Locomotives Ltd ==
- 31178 SECR P class; sold to the Bluebell Railway
- 35022 Holland-America Line, SR Merchant Navy class; sold to Jeremy Hosking as spares for 35027
- 35025 Brocklebank Line, SR Merchant Navy class, ownership transferred to the Merchant Navy Locomotive Preservation Society in 2026
- 35027 Port Line, SR Merchant Navy class; sold to Jeremy Hosking for overhaul to mainline condition
- 80078 BR Standard Class 4 2-6-4 Tank; sold to a private buyer in October 2012
