= Crewe Diesel TMD =

Diesel-electric locomotive traction maintenance depot

Crewe Diesel Depot
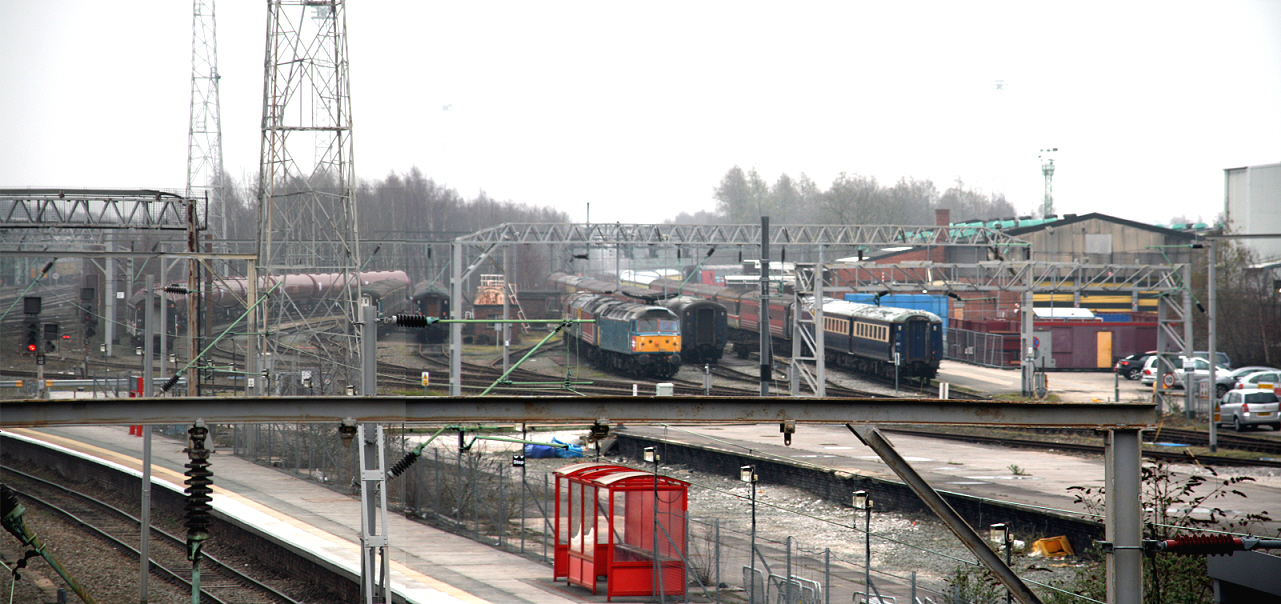
- Crewe Diesel TMD viewed from Crewe station in 2011
- Interactive map of Crewe Diesel Depot

Location
- Location: Crewe, Cheshire, England
- Coordinates: 53.0847°N 2.4312°W
- OS grid: SJ711542

Characteristics
- Owner: Locomotive Storage Ltd.
- Depot code: CD (1973–)
- Type: Steam locomotives, Carriages
- Roads: 8 internal; 12 external

History
- Opened: 1958; 68 years ago
- Original: British Railways
- BR region: London Midland Region
- Former depot code: 5A (1965–1973); CE (1973)

Crewe Diesel Depot is a former diesel-electric locomotive traction maintenance depot (also known as Crewe Diesel Traction Maintenance Depot and Crewe Diesel TMD) situated to the south of Crewe railway station. Built in 1958 by British Railways, it was used as a maintenance facility for the diesel locomotives that were at the time replacing steam traction across the National Rail network. Following the privatisation of British Rail, depot ownership transferred to EWS, now DB Schenker, and continued as a base for diesel traction, latterly becoming a facility for storing surplus rolling stock. In 2014, ownership transferred to Locomotive Storage Ltd, which have been, and are continuing to, renovate the site.

== British Railways ==
Constructed in 1957 and opened the following year, the site was built to maintain the growing fleet of British Railways diesel locomotives and multiple units used on the Midland region.

It was 141 ft (43 m) wide, with five 270 ft (82 m) through roads and five of 80 ft (24 m). Oil-fired boilers heated the offices, messroom, locker room and toilets, designed to accommodate up to 100, with a maximum of 80 at any one time. A 14,000 imp gal (64,000 L) fuel tank supplied three fuelling points. The depot had a two-ton electric hoist block for unloading stores from wagons and a trichloroethylene degreasing machine.

== Privatisation ==
Following privatisation, the depot passed into the hands of English, Welsh and Scottish Railway, which continued to use the site for the assessment, maintenance, repairing, storing and scrapping of diesel-electric locomotives.

Throughout the late 2000s and early 2010s, the site fell into an increasing state of disrepair, being used for the long-term storage of DB Schenker locomotives. The site was also extensively used by Riviera Trains for the storage of rolling stock.

== Current ownership ==
In early 2014, the lease was signed for Locomotive Storage Ltd to operate and develop the facility. This included the 12 outside roads (one of which is electrified), 8 internal roads and the depot building itself, along with the dedicated paint shop and heavy lift building.

Since the transfer of ownership, the site has been extensively renovated. The main building has seen the complete renewal of its roof, along with internal refitting that has included the complete renovation of the living and office areas, allowing the site to become home to both Locomotive Storage and LNWR Heritage's offices.

The internal layout of the building has been modified, with the installation of a partition protecting three of the internal roads from dirt and dust from the workshop areas. Several five-ton cranes have been installed, along with heavy lifting jacks, to expand the maintenance and overhaul capabilities of the site.

== LNWR Heritage ==
LNWR Heritage, a heritage rail restoration company owned by the Royal Scot Locomotive and General Trust, moved to the site in early 2015; it transferred much of its operation from their former base, north of the railway station at Crewe Heritage Centre.

Leasing several of the roads inside the main building, LNWR Heritage can make use of five- and 45-ton cranes, heavy lifting jacks, pit roads, and dedicated workshop and paint shop facilities, aimed at providing a permanent base for their heritage rail engineering work for many years to come.

== Steam locomotives on site ==
Image	Number	Name	Class	Wheel Configuration	Year built	Builder	Status	Notes
	2013	Prince George	LNWR George the Fifth Class	4-4-0	20##	LNWR Prince George the Fifth Steam Locomotive Trust	On Static Display	
	5029	Nunney Castle	GWR 4073 Class	4-6-0	1934	Swindon Works	Under Overhaul	
	6024	King Edward I	GWR 6000 Class	4-6-0	1930	Swindon Works	Under Overhaul	
	35022	Holland America Line	SR Merchant Navy class	4-6-2	1948	Eastleigh Works	Stored	
	45321	The Sherwood Forester	LMS Stanier Class 5 4-6-0	4-6-0	1936	Armstrong Whitworth	Awaiting Overhaul	
	46100	Royal Scot	LMS Rebuilt Royal Scot Class	4-6-0	1927	North British Locomotive Company	Operational	Boiler ticket expires in 2025.
	60532	Blue Peter	LNER Peppercorn Class A2	4-6-2	1948	Doncaster Works	Operational	
	61306	Mayflower	LNER Thompson Class B1	4-6-0	1948	North British Locomotive Company	Operational	Boiler ticket expires in 2029.
	70000	Britannia	BR Standard Class 7	4-6-2	1951	Crewe Works	Under Repair	Boiler ticket expires in 2032.

== Future ==
It is planned that further developments on the site will include the construction of a dedicated boilershop, to be used by LNWR Heritage, for the overhaul of steam locomotive boilers. Locomotive Storage Ltd will also oversee the construction of a two road, roughly 250m long shed to allow the under-cover storage of carriages and other vehicles at the site.

These developments will likely see changes to the current track layout at the site.
