= DB Cargo UK =

British rail freight operator

DB Cargo (UK) Limited
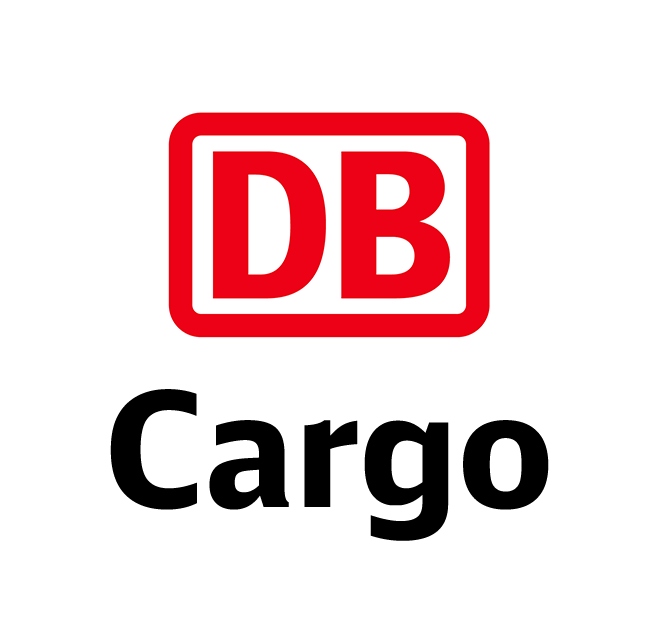
- Industry: Rail freight
- Predecessor: Loadhaul; Mainline Freight; Rail Express Systems; Railfreight Distribution; Transrail Freight; English, Welsh & Scottish Railway (EWS)
- Founded: 1995; 31 years ago
- Headquarters: Doncaster, England
- Area served: United Kingdom
- Key people: Edward Burkhardt (Chairman & CEO 1995–1999); Keith Heller (CEO / Co-chairman) 2004–2010; Alain Thauvette CEO
- Services: Bulk freight and intermodal logistics
- Owner: Deutsche Bahn
- Parent: DB Cargo
- Subsidiaries: Axiom Rail
- Website: uk.dbcargo.com

DB Cargo UK (formerly DB Schenker Rail UK and English, Welsh & Scottish Railway) is a British rail freight company owned by Deutsche Bahn and headquartered in Doncaster, England.

The company was established by Wisconsin Central in early 1995 as North & South Railways, successfully acquiring and merging five of the six freight companies that were sold during the privatisation of British Rail. (Note: The sixth rail freight company created during privatisation, Freightliner, was privatised through a management buyout.) On 25 April 1996, the English, Welsh & Scottish EWS brand was revealed and implemented over successive months. By the end of March 1997, it controlled 90% of the UK rail freight market, operated a fleet of 900 locomotives and 19,000 wagons, and had 7,000 employees. During the late 1990s, EWS invested heavily into rolling stock renewal, procuring a large number of British Rail Class 66 diesel locomotives. EWS reduced staff numbers, aiming to reduce numbers by around 3,000 when merging the companies. It also acquired National Power's open-access freight operator in April 1998.

During January 2001, the Canadian National Railway acquired a 42.5% stake in the business via its purchase of Wisconsin Central. In 2003, EWS lost the Royal Mail contract to run mail trains. In October 2005, it launched a subsidiary, Euro Cargo Rail, to focus on the French market; that same year, the company acquired the wagon maintenance business Marcroft. During 2006, the Office of Rail Regulation fined EWS £4.1million for anti-competitive practices in the coal haulage sector.

In November 2007, the company was bought by German train operator Deutsche Bahn for £309 million. In January 2009, EWS was rebranded as DB Schenker. In November 2011, a weekly service using European sized swap bodies commenced between Barking, London and Wrocław, Poland using High Speed 1. In March 2016, the company was rebranded as DB Cargo UK.

In October 2016, DB Cargo announced plans to cut 893 jobs in response to a sharp downturn in coal and steel traffic. In the following year, it announced a loss after tax for the financial year of £57 million against a turnover of £325 million. Over the next two years, the company's fleet size was reduced somewhat, mainly through the disposal or sale of older elements. During 2019, DB Cargo signed an agreement with Maritime Transport Ltd to launch a new rail freight operation, Maritime Intermodal.

== History ==
=== Background ===
In 1988, British Rail's (BR) freight operations were split into two divisions Railfreight Distribution (RfD) and Trainload Freight (TLF). RfD took over BR's Freightliner and Speedlink services and general wagonload and trainload services, excluding coal, petroleum, aggregates and metals. BR's bulk trainload services were handled by the Trainload Freight division. During 1991, the Rail Express Systems brand was created to handle mail and postal services.

After the passing of the Railways Act 1993, five rail freight companies were formed from RfD and TLF. On 1 April 1994, TLF was split into three separate geographical businesses: Trainload Freight North East, Trainload Freight West and Trainload Freight South East, with each initially given existing contracts, based on the geographic origin of the traffic flow or in the case of power station coal the split was determined by the location of the power stations concerned. There were also some trainload services previously operated by the contract services business of RfD. The three new businesses were to be re-branded as Loadhaul, Mainline Freight and Transrail Freight for the short duration of their existence.

The remainder of RfD was split into two companies: Freightliner (container operations between ports), with the residual RfD company operating freight trains through the Channel Tunnel. The Mail and Parcels business were sold as Rail Express Systems and Red Star Parcels. These companies were subsequently put up for sale by competitive tender.

=== English, Welsh & Scottish Railway ===
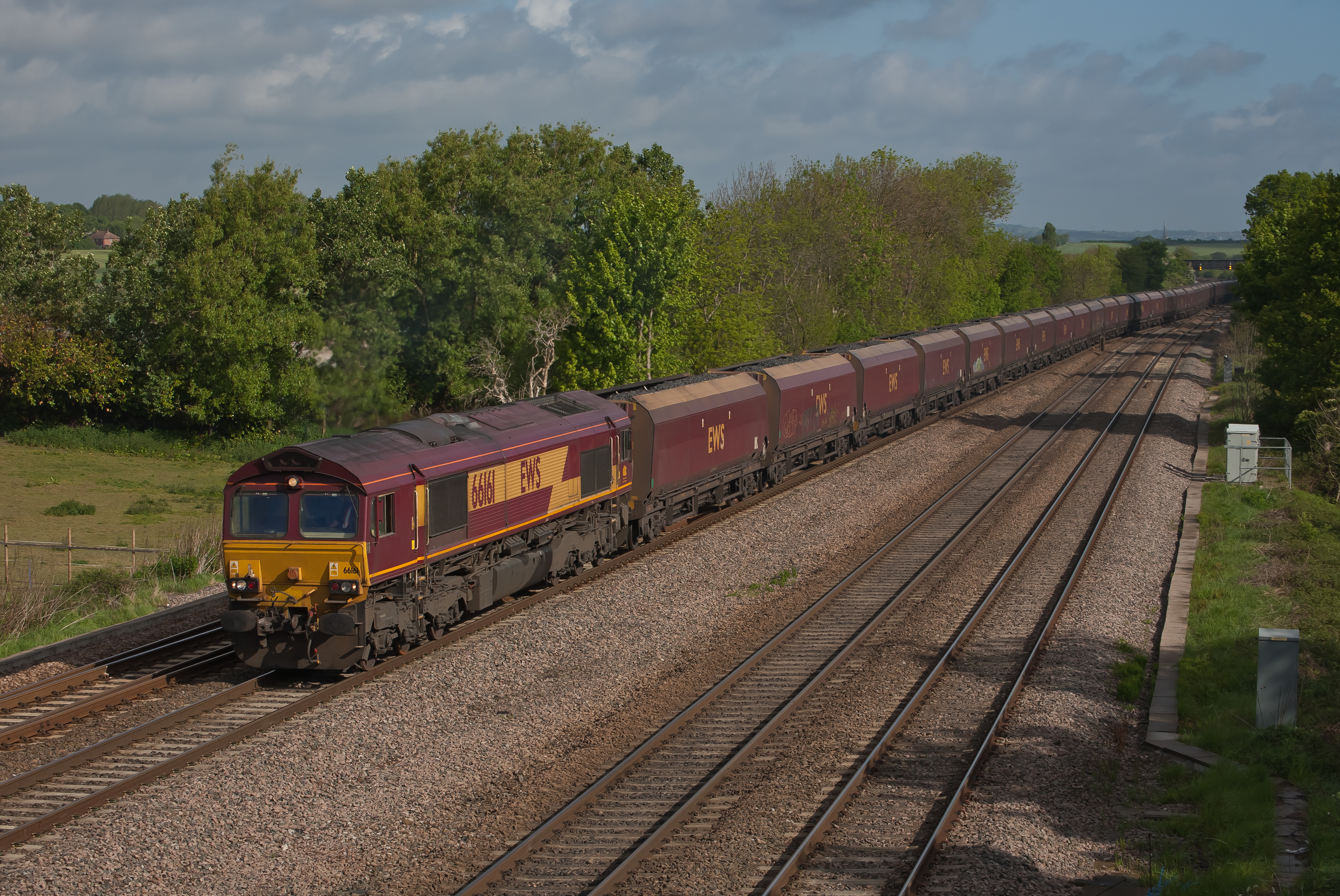
EWS liveried Class 66 and coal wagons near Tupton, Derbyshire in May 2011

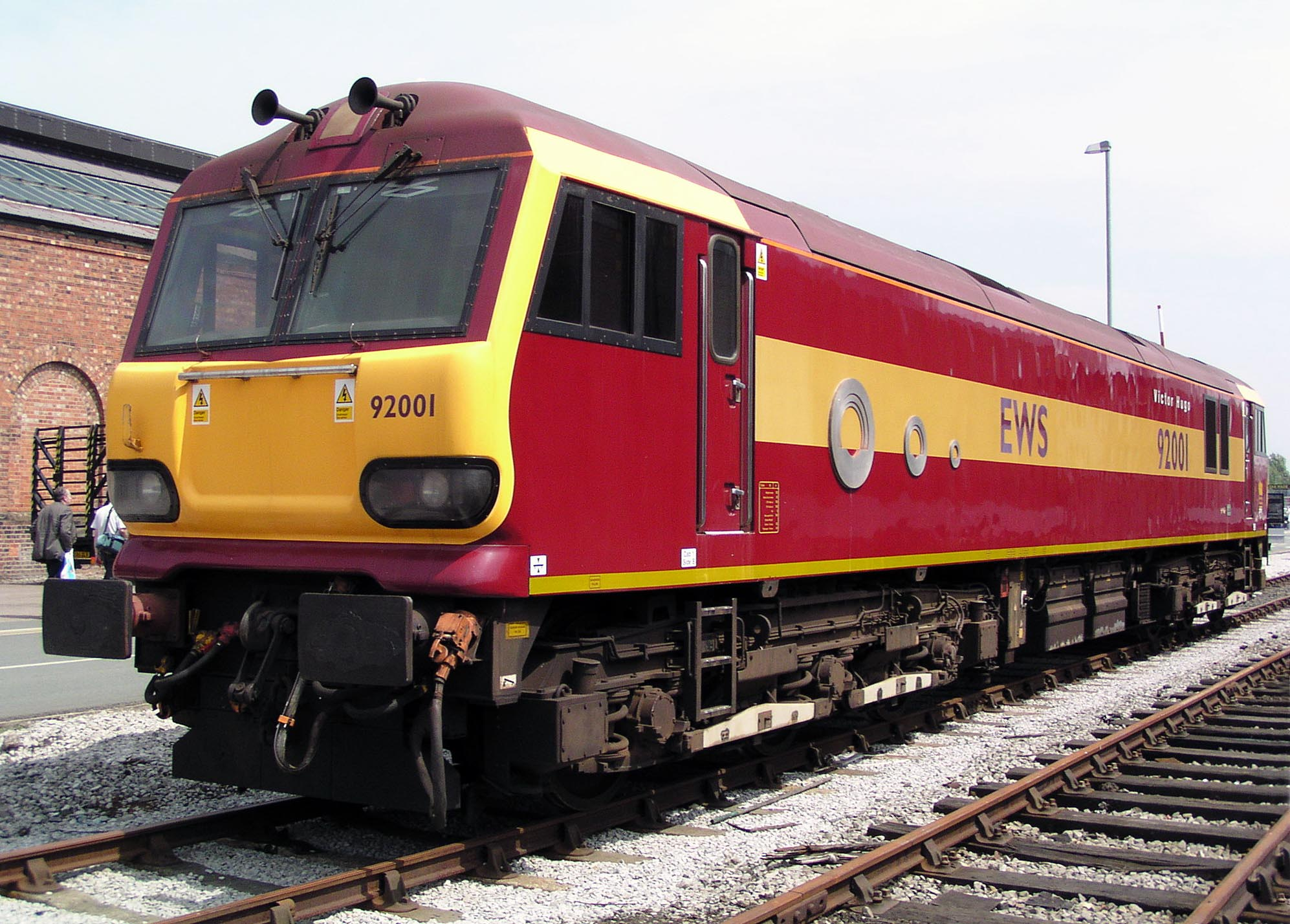
EWS liveried Class 92 at Crewe Works in June 2003

A new company, North and South Railways Limited, was formed for the purpose of bidding for the ex-BR freight businesses being offered for sale. It was owned by a consortium, headed by Wisconsin Central, and financed by multiple investment firms, including Berkshire Partners, Goldman Sachs and Fay Richwhite.

On 9 December 1995, North and South Railways purchased Rail Express Systems for £24 million. With this purchase came the contract for the Royal Mail train service, including the Travelling Post Office trains, and the contract to haul the Royal Train. A fleet of 164 locomotives and 677 postal vans were included along with depots at Bristol Barton Hill, Cambridge, Crewe and London Euston.

Then, on 24 February 1996, British Rail's three trainload freight companies, Loadhaul, Mainline Freight and Transrail Freight were acquired for £225 million. The sale included 914 locomotives and 19,310 wagons.

All four companies were subsequently merged into North and South Railways, nullifying the government's effort to create multiple competitive rail freight firms through the privatisation; the decision to allow the creation of a rail freight company with a dominant market position was justified by the additional competition faced from other transport modes. At the time, rail had a 6% share of the freight market.

Initially, the four companies continued to trade under their existing names. However, on 25 April 1996, the English, Welsh & Scottish (EWS) brand was unveiled.

On 10 July 1996, in accordance with the new branding, the holding company's name was changed to English, Welsh & Scottish Railway Holdings Limited. In October 1996, Loadhaul and Mainline Freight were merged with Transrail Freight, and employees transferred to Transrail Freight, which was then renamed to English, Welsh & Scottish Railway Limited.

One of the first actions of the enlarged company was to seek volunteers for redundancy, as it sought to reduce staff numbers by around 3,000, from 7,600.

On 24 December 1996, EWS was announced as the preferred bidder for the loss-making Railfreight Distribution, for which it received grants and subsidies estimated to amount to £242 million over eight years. including subsidies for the use of the Channel Tunnel. Railfreight Distribution's businesses included international containerised freight, movement of cars and automotive components by rail, and freight services for the Ministry of Defence. The sale, which included 157 locomotives, was concluded on 12 March 1997. At this point, EWS controlled 90% of the rail freight market. Railfreight Distribution was renamed English Welsh & Scottish Railway International on 1 December 1998.

The new company had a vast portfolio, comprising in excess of 900 locomotives, 19,000 freight wagons, and 7,000 employees. Track access charges were renegotiated and, following 1,800 job redundancies, the work force was involved in profit sharing and other incentivised working plans; as a consequence, shipping rates were reduced by over 30%. Many locomotives inherited on foundation were considered unreliable, and expensive to maintain; the company invested heavily in modernisation of its rolling stock; by 2002, £750 million had been invested in this manner, resulting in the delivery of 280 new locomotives and in excess of 2,000 new wagons. (Note: The main orders were: 250 EMD Series 66 locomotives from GM-EMD built in USA/Canada, 30 JT 42HW-HS from Alstom / Electro Motive Diesel (Spain/USA), and around 2500 wagons from Thrall Car Manufacturing Company, built at the Thrall Europa, York works.)

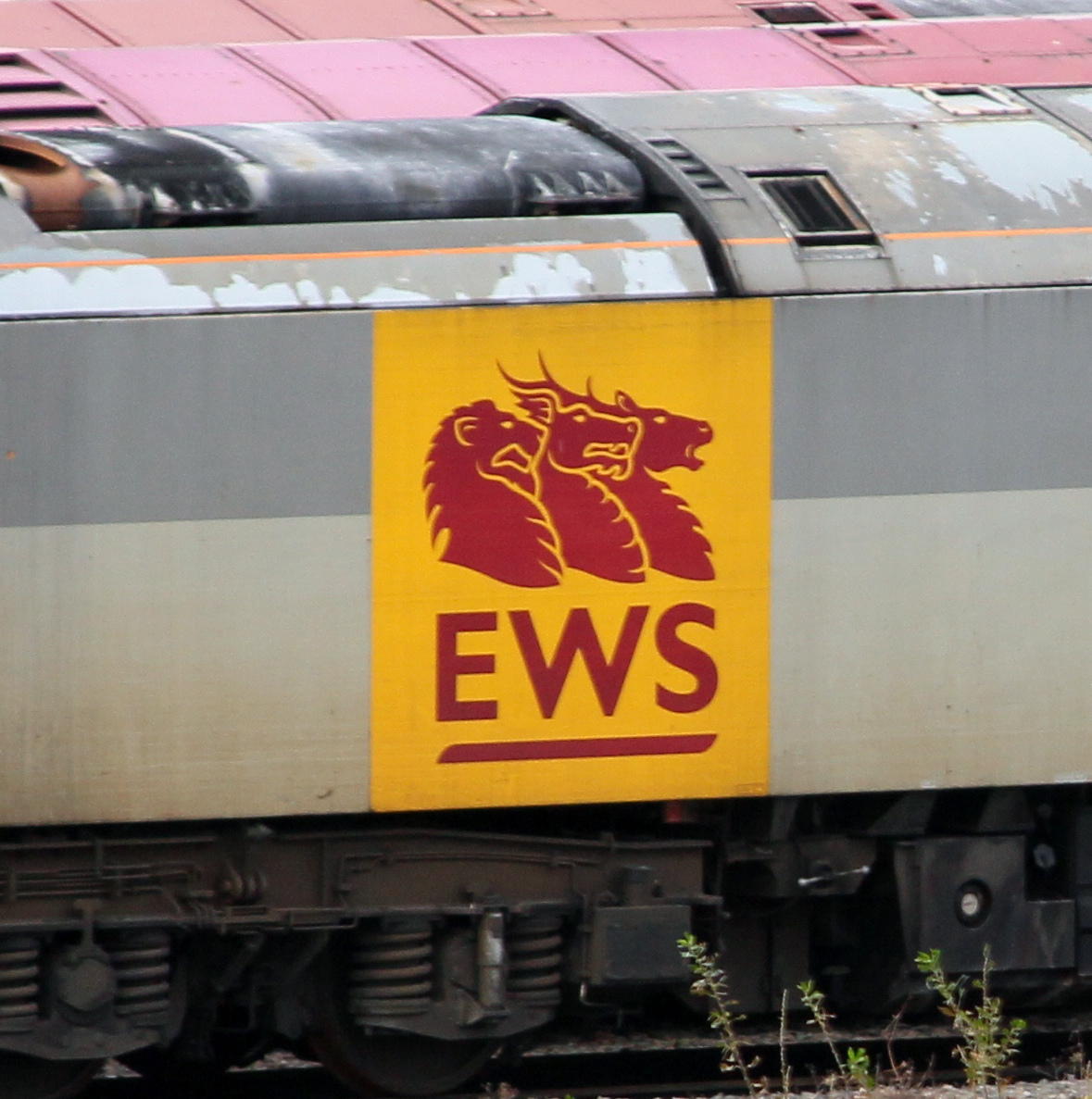
Big Beasties logo used on a locomotive.

Around this time, the company was represented by a logo that was colloquially known as the "Beasties", consisting of three heads: the lion of England, the dragon of Wales and the stag of Scotland. A larger version of the logo was called the "Big Beasties".

Services included mail, locomotive hire, wagonload traffic (branded 'Enterprise', founded by Transrail Freight), cross channel trains via the Channel Tunnel, trainload freight including oil, aggregates, cement and traffic related to the coal, electricity generation and steel industries, and infrastructure trains for Railtrack. Following privatisation EWS began to compete for Intermodal contracts, (Note: After 2002 began intermodal services from the ports of Felixstowe, Southampton, and Tilbury.) while it faced competition from Freightliner in its core markets. In 1999, the company's turnover was £533.7 million, representing an 80% market share in terms of value.

On 1 April 1998, open access operator National Power's rail division was taken over by EWS, along with its six Class 59 locomotives and 106 wagons.

During late January 2001, the Canadian National Railway announced it had agreed to purchase Wisconsin Central. The deal, which included Wisconsin Central's 42.5% stake in EWS, was concluded in October 2001.

During 2003, the Royal Mail terminated its mail train contract with EWS; this traffic was transferred to aircraft and road transport instead. EWS acquired the assets of wagon bogie company Probotec Limited in 2005. (Note: Probotec was formed in 2004 from Powell Duffryn Rail. Powell Duffryn Rail originated as the Cambrian Wagon Company, registered 1905, numerous amalgamations and changes of shareholding, became part of Powell Duffryn in 1935; also acquired the Gloucester Railway Carriage and Wagon Company in 1986.) It was formed into a new subsidiary, Axiom Rail, that also took over responsibility for some of the depots, and leasing surplus locomotives overseas.

During October 2005, the company launched a new subsidiary, which traded as Euro Cargo Rail, based in the French market. Several Class 66 locomotives were transferred from EWS to Euro Cargo Rail.

In November 2005, EWS acquired the wagon maintenance business Marcroft. Due to the potential of the acquisition to reduce competition in the UK wagon repair market, the acquisition was referred to the Competition Commission by the Office of Fair Trading, which required EWS to sell all or part of the business, excluding Marcroft's works at Stoke on Trent, which were incorporated into Axiom.

By 2006, company turnover was reportedly approaching £1 billion. In 2006, the Office of Rail Regulation fined EWS £4.1 million for engaging in anti-competitive practices in the coal haulage business; at the time, the company held a virtual monopoly on such traffic, and its practices had led to official complaints from both Enron and Freightliner Heavy Haul in the early 2000s. (Note: Complaints made in 2003 alleging predatory pricing in the passenger charter sector were not upheld.)

=== DB Cargo UK ===
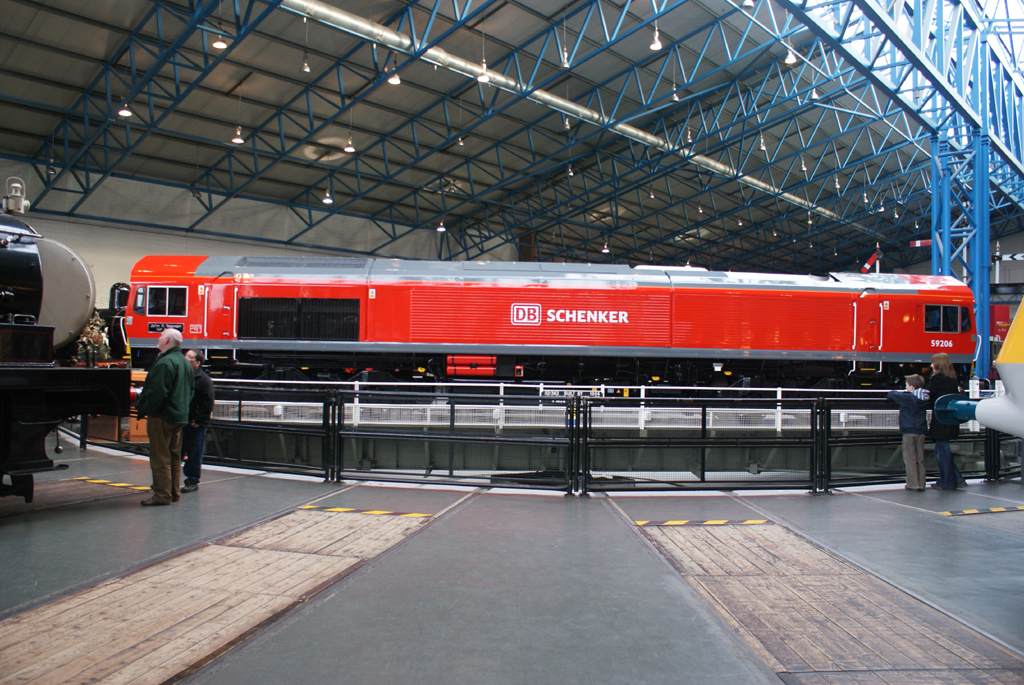
DB Schenker liveried 59206 at the National Railway Museum, York in January 2009

On 28 June 2007, Deutsche Bahn announced it had agreed to purchase EWS, subject to receiving regulatory approval, in exchange for £309 million. At the time of the acquisition, EWS had a market share of around 70% in the United Kingdom rail freight sector and had around 5,000 employees. After the transaction was approved by the European Commissioner for Competition, the transaction was completed on 13 November 2007.

At the time of the sale, it was announced that EWS would not be rebranded, however, on 1 January 2009, EWS was rebranded as DB Schenker along with Deutsche Bahn's Railion and DB Schenker divisions.

The first locomotive painted in DB Schenker livery was Class 59 59206 at Toton Depot in January 2009, being formally unveiled at the National Railway Museum, York on 21 January 2009. (Note: Previously two EWS locomotives had received DB Schenker branding — including a light blue British Rail Class 60 60074 named "Teenage Cancer Trust")

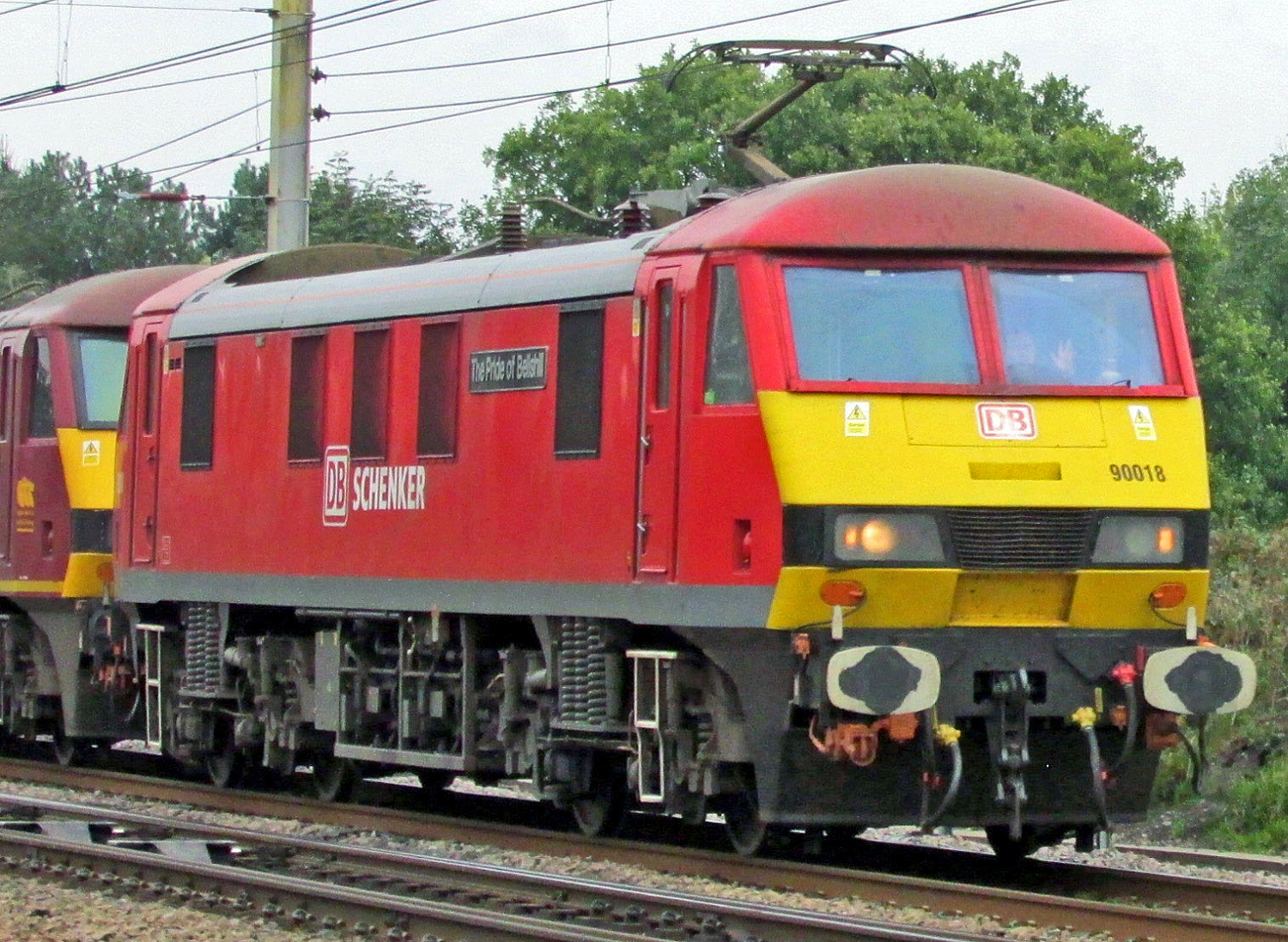
Class 90 90018 The Pride of Bellshill in DB Schenker colours on a freight working in October 2016

During 2009, DB Schenker Rail began work to enable Class 92 hauled trains to operate freight services on the High Speed 1 by installing in cab TVM signalling. The project received funding from the European Commission and it was originally anticipated services would begin in early 2010. On 25 March 2011, a modified Class 92 locomotive travelled from Dollands Moor to Singlewell using the TVM430 signalling system for the first time. The first of five planned test trains ran as a loaded container train from Hams Hall, West Midlands to Novara, Italy on 27 May 2011. DB planned to upgrade an additional five Class 92 locomotives to allow them to run on High Speed 1, making a fleet of six.

In July 2011, a trial run of wagons carrying curtain walled swap bodies built to a larger European loading gauge was run from Dollands Moor, Folkestone to east London. From 11 November 2011, a weekly service using European sized swap bodies has run between Barking, London and Wroclaw, Poland using High Speed 1.

On 2 March 2016, DB Schenker was rebranded as DB Cargo UK. On 17 October 2016, new DB Cargo UK CEO Hans-Georg Werner announced plans to cut 893 jobs in a bid to counter 'unprecedented' market changes, these being a combination of factors, including changes in the British Government's energy policy that had resulted in the early closure of coal-fired power stations, hence DB Cargo UK ran 78% fewer coal trains compared to 2015, while UK steel volumes were also dropping as the industry had been impacted by high energy prices; this resulted in DB Cargo UK running 33% fewer steel trains from 2015. However, Werner recognised that "overall UK steel demand remains stable".

During 2017, DB Cargo UK announced an after-tax loss for the financial year of £57 million against a turnover of £325 million.

=== Maritime Intermodal ===
In early 2019, DB Cargo signed an agreement with Maritime Transport Ltd to create a new rail freight operation called Maritime Intermodal. From 1 April 2019, Maritime took over the running of DB's freight terminals at Trafford Park (Manchester), Birmingham (Birch Coppice) and Wakefield Europort. Seven British Rail Class 66 locomotives have been repainted in blue Maritime livery and named:

- 66005 Maritime Intermodal One
- 66047 Maritime Intermodal Two
- 66142 Maritime Intermodal Three
- 66051 Maritime Intermodal Four
- 66162 Maritime Intermodal Five
- 66090 Maritime Intermodal Six
- 66148 Maritime Intermodal Seven

It is expected that up to ten locomotives will receive the blue livery.

== Services and rolling stock ==
=== Rolling stock ===
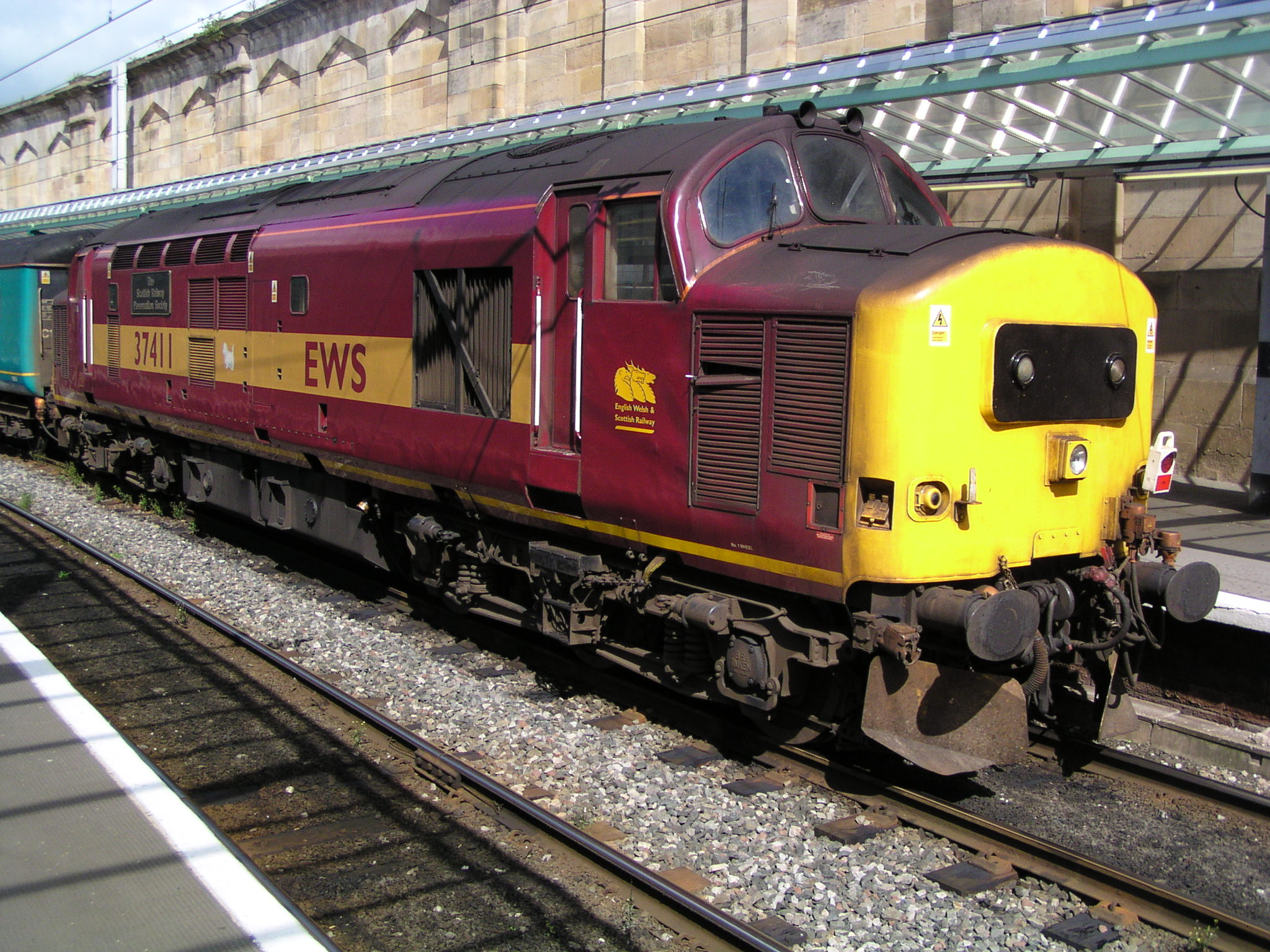
37411 at Carlisle station on an Arriva Trains Northern service in August 2004

EWS inherited a fleet of 1,231 locomotives from its British Rail acquisitions. This fleet, which was mainly diesel powered, had an average age in excess of 30 years; furthermore, roughly 300 were inoperable, having been cannibalised for spares. To enable the company to offer lower pricing to customers, EWS needed to reduce operating costs and increase availability, and quickly concluded that this goal would require new traction to be procured.

During May 1996, the company placed a £375 million order for 250 Class 66 and 30 Class 67 diesel-electric locomotives with the American locomotive manufacturer Electro-Motive Diesel (EMD); the deal was referred to as "the biggest British loco order since steam days". These replaced a large proportion of its original fleet, including all of the 20, 31, 33, 37, 47, 56, 58, 73 and 86 class locomotives. Through improved utilisation, they also replaced many of the newer 60 and 90 class locomotives as well.

During 1999, EWS gained the attention of the Rail Regulator for its practice of scrapping serviceable locomotives rather than making them available for sale to potential competitors; on future disposals, the company was compelled to make efforts to sell units before being allowed to scrap them.

Several of the firm's redundant locomotives saw further use on infrastructure trains in Europe, such as numerous Class 37s operated in France (40), Italy (2) and Spain (14), Class 56s in France (30), and Class 58s in France (26), the Netherlands (3) and Spain (8).

During September 2010, twenty Class 60s were offered for disposal by DB Schenker. Many marked for disposal had sustained catastrophic failures or were otherwise in a poor condition. During November 2010, the firm announced that a batch of 20 Class 60s would be overhauled. According to Rail Magazine, rumours that DB Schenker was interested in replacing the Class 60's engines were prevalent around this time. In January 2011, DB Schenker announced that seven units would undergo overhauls, along with an option to overhaul a further fourteen members of the class; this work reportedly extended the fleet's operational life by 15 years. During January 2013, the overhaul programme was described as an "upgrade" that created a new fleet of "Super 60's". The programme involved the complete overhaul, but not total replacement, of the locomotive's engine, as well as the refurbishment of various elements, including the traction motors, bogies, control gear, cabs, and electrical systems.

In 2018, DB Cargo sold ten Class 66 locomotives to GBRf for an undisclosed sum, comprising eight stored and two active locomotives many with significant engine defects. In 2019, it also sold all of its 59/2 fleet to Freightliner following the latter's takeover of the Mendip stone traffic. DB Cargo also sold five Class 60s to private sales/metal recyclers.

In 2023 in response to the UK Energy crisis DB Cargo UK's current managing director Andrea Rossi announced intentions to withdraw all of their Class 90s with the intention to sell or scrap the locomotives with Rossi stating that the running of electric hauled traction was no longer economically viable, the company instead decided that electric hauled traction would be replaced by diesel traction such as the Class 66 locomotive. The company also stated that they will pledge for further research and implementation of alternative EVO based fuels to meet their climate targets. In September 2023 12 Class 90s were offered for sale on DB's website; the locomotives listed were; 90017, 90018, 90022, 90023, 90025, 90027, 90030, 90031, 90032, 90033, 90038 and 90040.

=== Current fleet in the UK ===
Class	Image	Type	Built	Number	Wheel Arr	Numbers/Notes
60		Diesel locomotive	1989–1993	52	Co-Co	Fleet of 100 inherited from EWS.: All 52 locos are in storage with 47 listed for sale.
66		Diesel locomotive	1998–2000	158	Co-Co	Fleet of 250 inherited from EWS. 158 are operational as of 2024.: 2 are in storage following accidents.
67		Diesel locomotive	1999–2000	20	Bo-Bo	Fleet of 30 inherited from EWS. 20 locomotives are operational in 2024.: 6 are in storage as of 2024.; 11 are subleased to Transport for Wales Rail.
90		Electric locomotive	1987–1990	12	Bo-Bo	Fleet of 24 inherited from EWS.: 12 are in storage in response to high energy prices.
92		Electric locomotive	1993–1996	4	Co-Co	Fleet of 30 inherited from EWS. 4 locomotives are operational as of 2025.: 13 locomotives are stored as of 2025.
			Total	246		

=== Former fleet ===
Class	Image	Type	Built	Number	Wheel Arr	Numbers/Notes	Withdrawn
08		Shunter	1953	5	0-6-0	Fleet of 5 locomotives. All sold as of 2024: 08499 sold to Transport for Wales Rail; 08714 sold to Harry Needle Railroad Company; 08735 sold to Arriva Train Care; 08737 sold to Locomotive Services Limited; 08995 sold to Gwendraeth Valley Railway	2024
58		Diesel locomotive	1983–1987	50	Co-Co	EWS inherited the fleet of 50 locomotives from British Rail: 20 were exported to France, 8 to Spain and 4 to the Netherlands; 13 were scrapped in the UK; 5 have since been preserved	1999–2002
59		Diesel locomotive	1985-1995	6	Co-Co	DB put the six Class 59/2s up for sale and they were purchased by Freightliner.	2019
60		Diesel locomotive	1989–1993	48	Co-Co	10 locomotives were sold to Colas Rail in 2014 and then to GB Railfreight in 2018; 18 sold to DCRail, 4 of which transferred in 2019; 3 preserved, 1 scrapped and 1 sent to a metal recycler in 2019 which was later bought by DCRail; 3 sold to GB Railfreight in 2023; 12 sold to Land Recovery in 2024	2018–2024
66		Diesel locomotive	1998–2000	90	Co-Co	10 locomotives were sold to GB Railfreight in 2018; 65 locomotives transferred to subsidiary Euro Cargo Rail; 15 locomotives have been exported to DB Cargo Polska; 66048 was withdrawn in 2016 following an accident at Carr Bridge; 66230 is in storage at Toton TMD following an accident at Dollands Moor in September 2018	2006–2007, 2016, 2018
67		Diesel locomotive	1999–2000	4	Bo-Bo	2 locomotives sold to Colas Rail; 2 locomotives sold to Transport for Wales Rail.	2017, 2024
86		Electric locomotive	1965–1966	15	Bo-Bo	EWS inherited a fleet of 15 locomotives from British Rail.: 13 locomotives were scrapped; 1 locomotive preserved by West Coast Railways; 1 locomotive exported to Hungary	1996–2004
87		Electric locomotive	1974	1	Bo-Bo	87101 Scrapped at Barrow Hill 2002	1999
90		Electric locomotive	1987–1990	12	Bo-Bo	2 were sold to Freightliner in April 2024; 6 were scrapped at Sandbach Commercial Dismantlers in Cheshire in July/August 2024; 2 sold to Sandbach Commercial Dismantlers in July 2024; 2 sold to European Metal Recyclers in July 2024	2024
92		Electric locomotive	1993–1996	13	Co-Co	9 exported to DB Cargo Romania; 4 exported to DB Cargo Bulgaria. In 2018, DB Cargo Romania sold 4 of their fleet of Class 92s to Transagent Rail Croatia	2018
325		Electric Multiple Unit	1995–1996	16		9 units scrapped; 7 units stored	2024

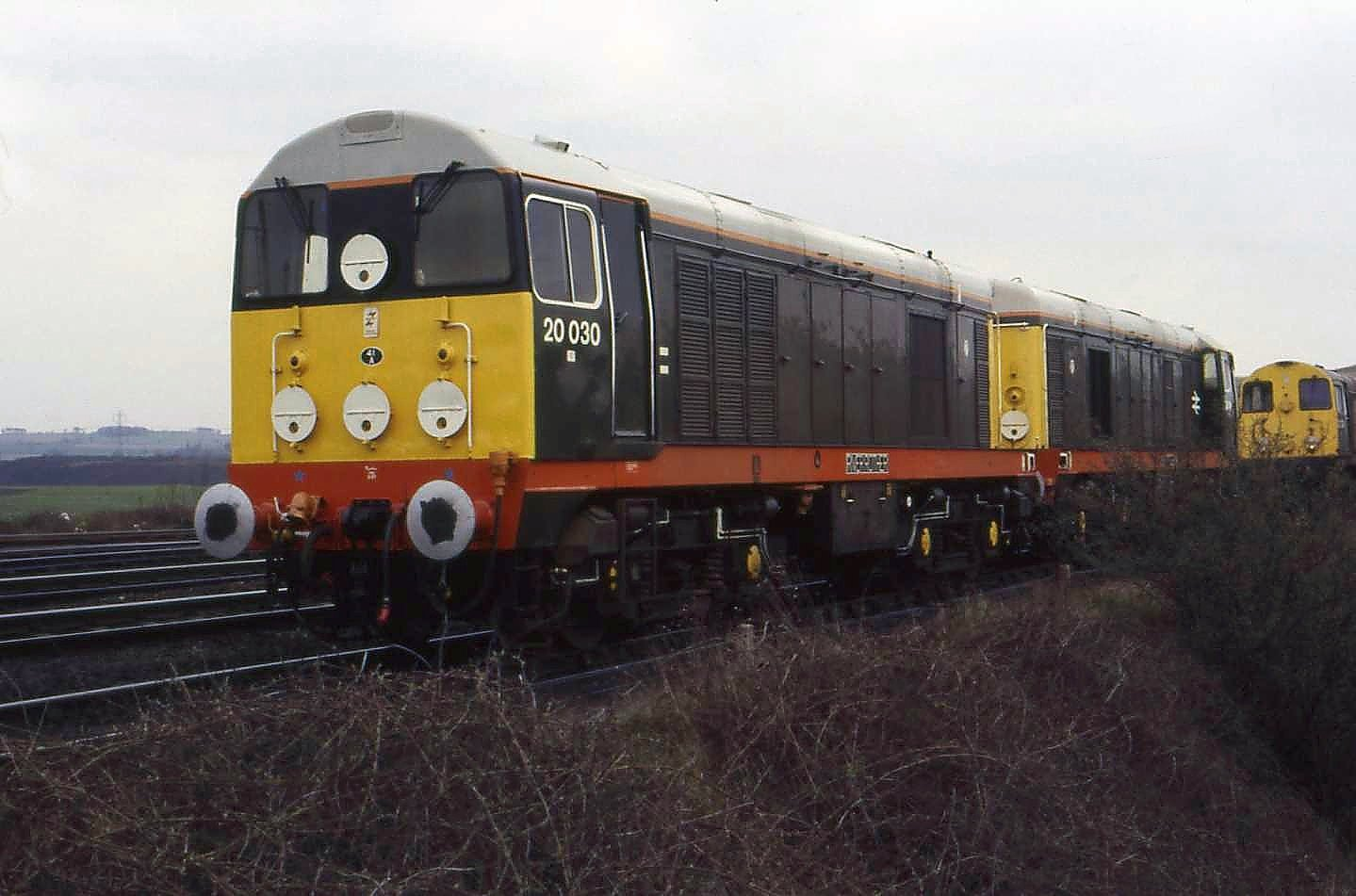
Class 20

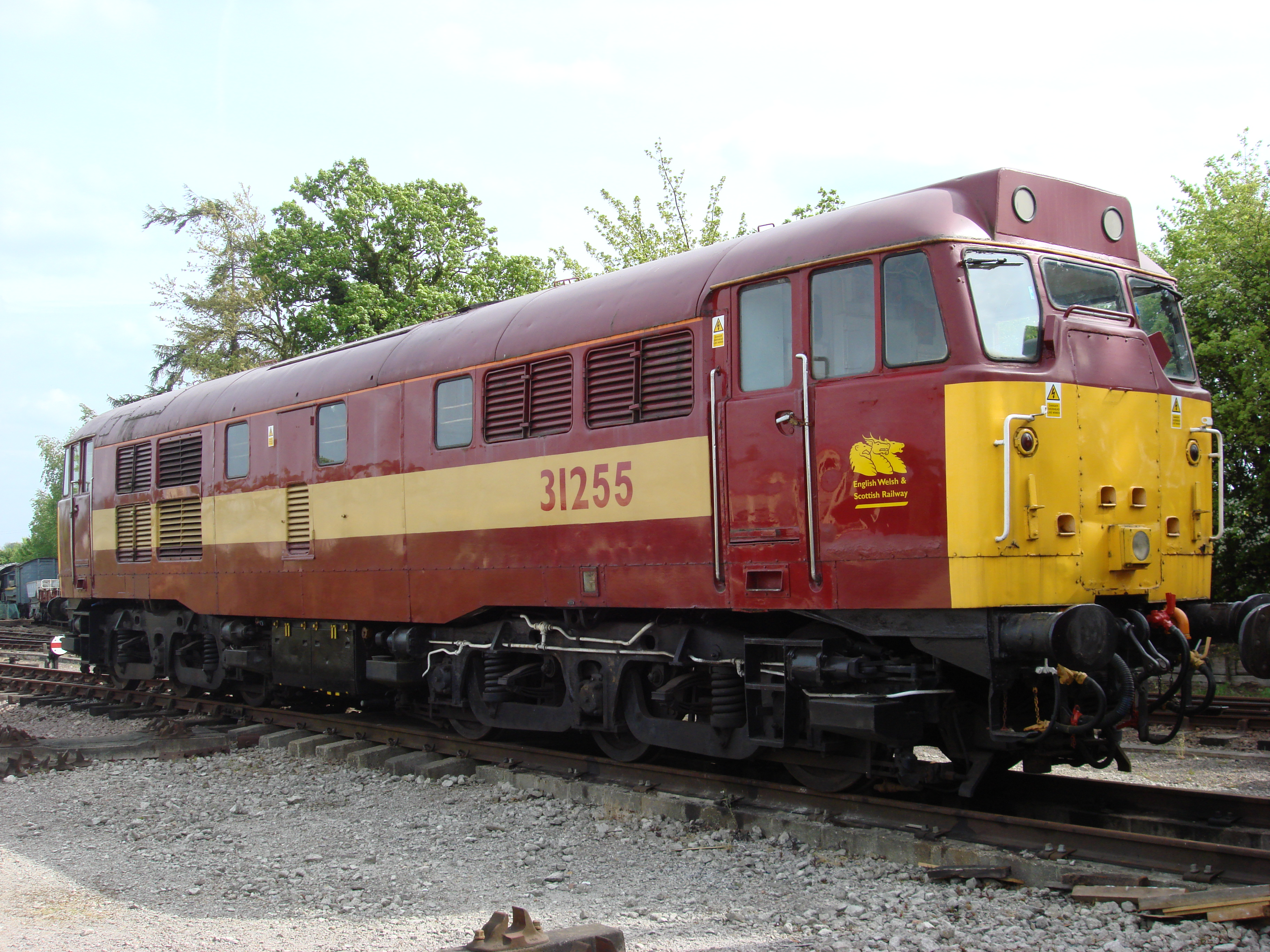
Class 31

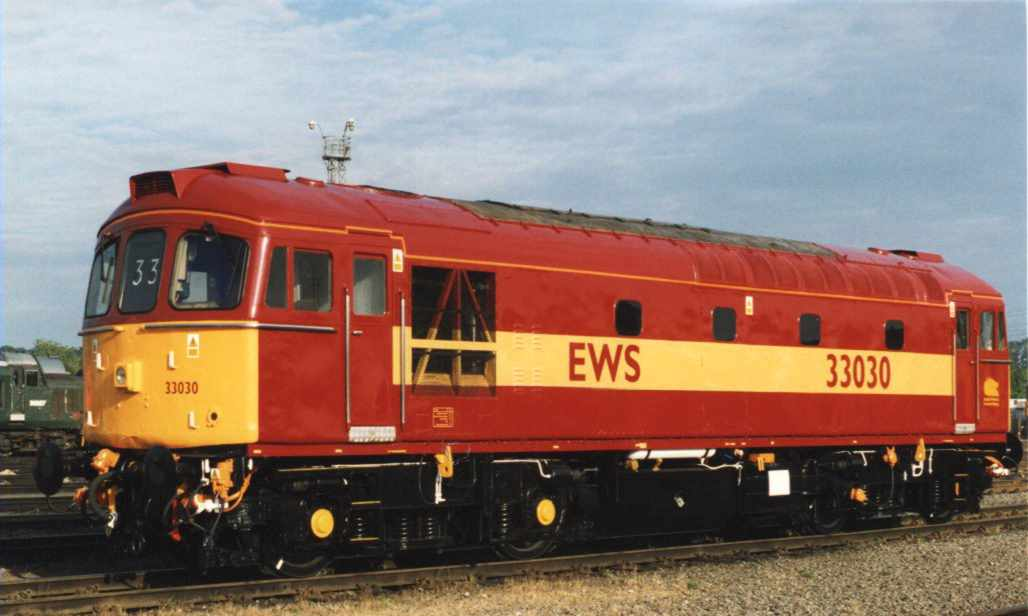
Class 33

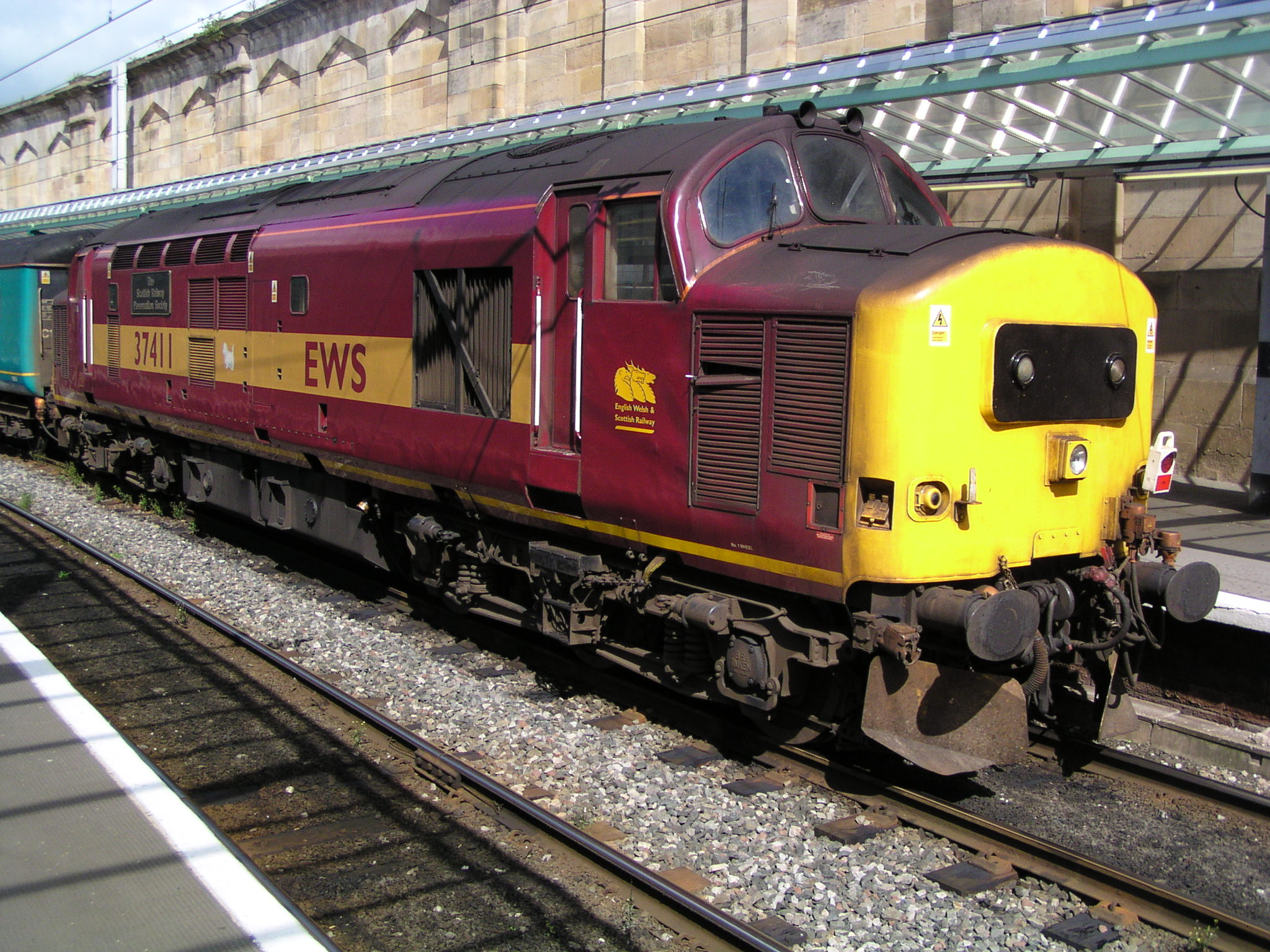
Class 37

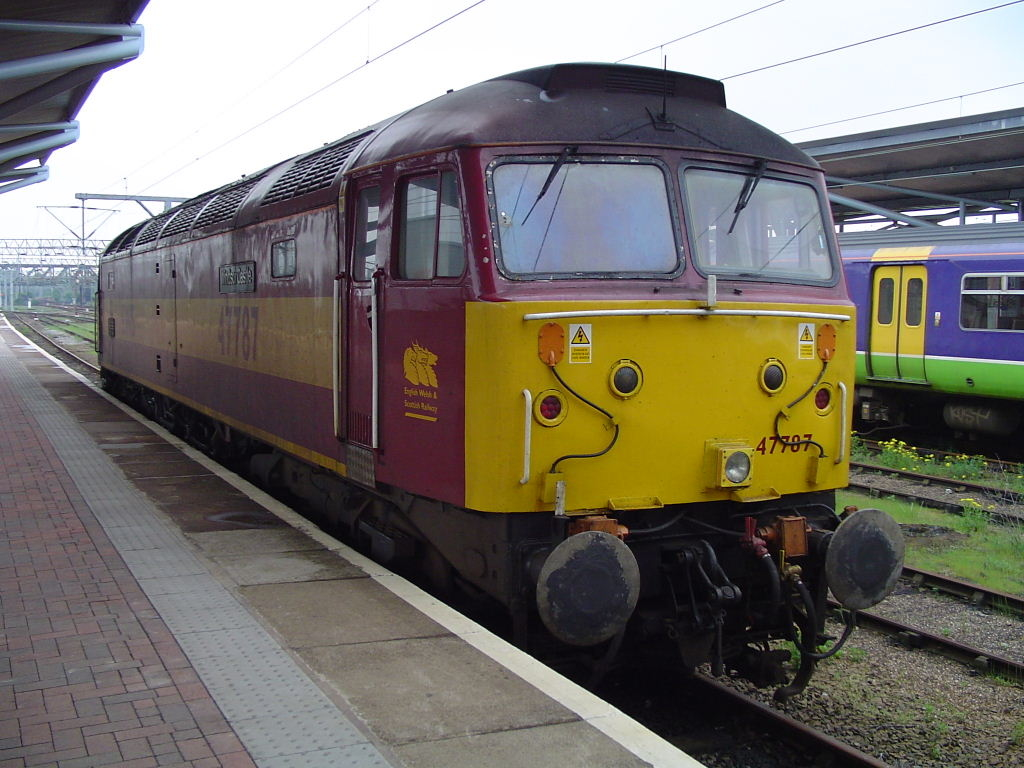
Class 47

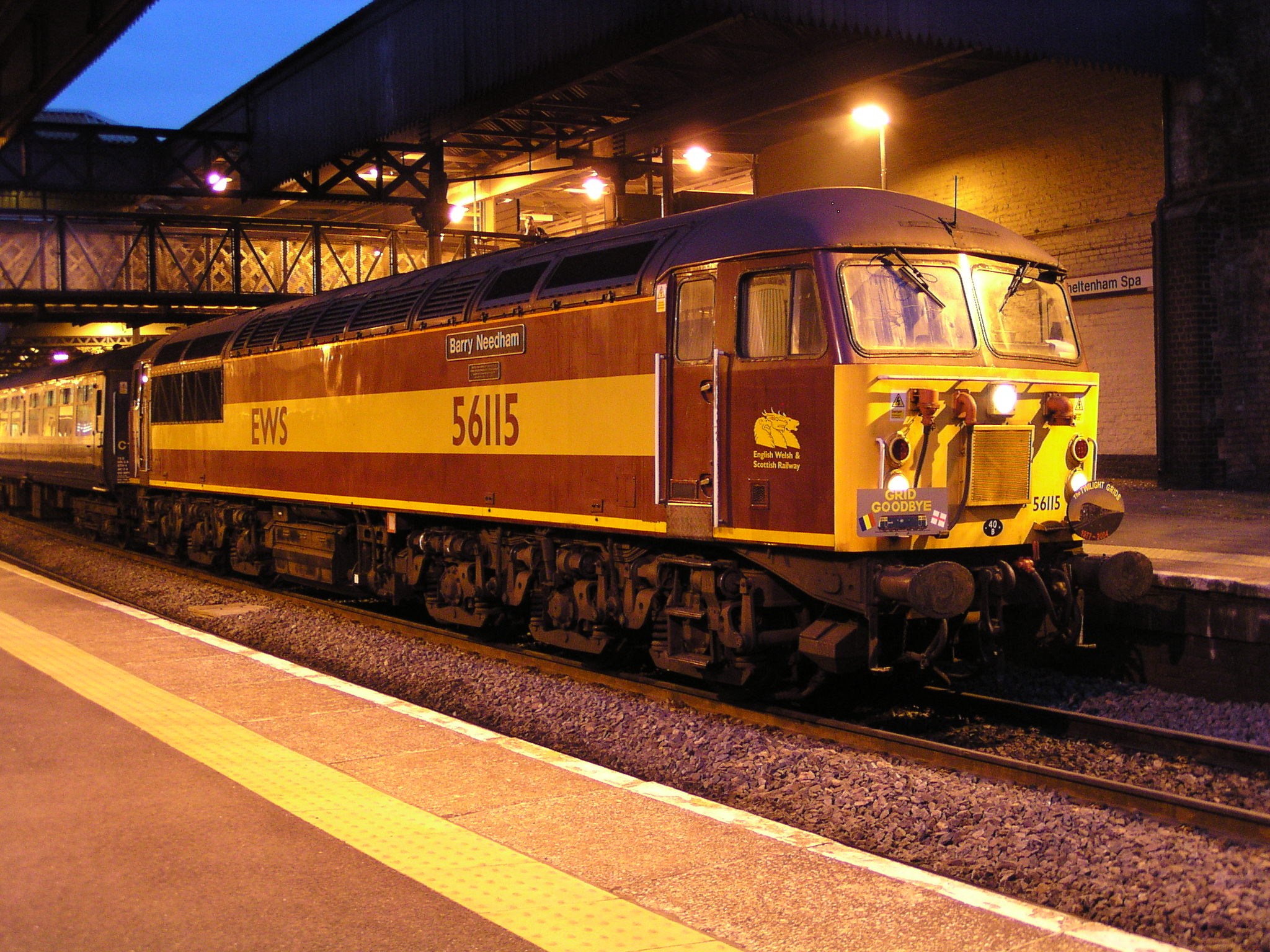
Class 56

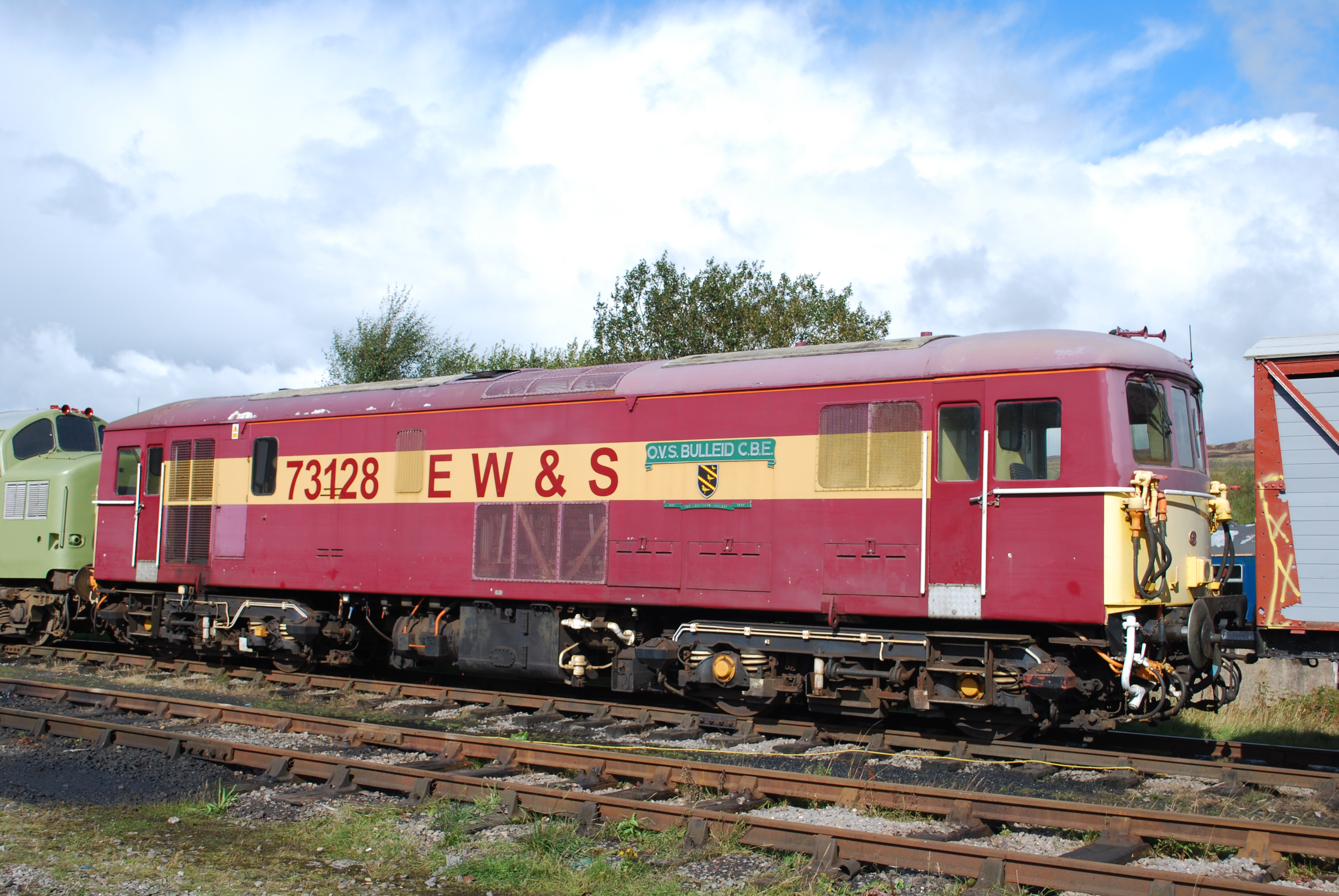
Class 73

=== Carriages and wagons ===
As well as an extensive fleet of freight wagons, DB Schenker Rail operate a small fleet of Mark 2 and Mark 3 carriages, some of the latter form the DB Cargo Company Train.

=== Depots ===
DB Cargo's primary maintenance depot is Toton. The electric fleet is maintained at Crewe. With a modern fleet requiring less maintenance, many of the depots EWS inherited have closed. Some of its other facilities including Bristol Barton Hill, Cambridge, Eastleigh and Newcastle were transferred to fellow Deutsche Bahn subsidiary LNWR (now Arriva TrainCare).

During 2001, EWS commenced a contract to service Virgin CrossCountry's Class 220/221 fleets at Bristol Barton Hill, Eastleigh, Newcastle, Old Oak Common and Three Bridges.

=== Passenger locomotive haulage ===
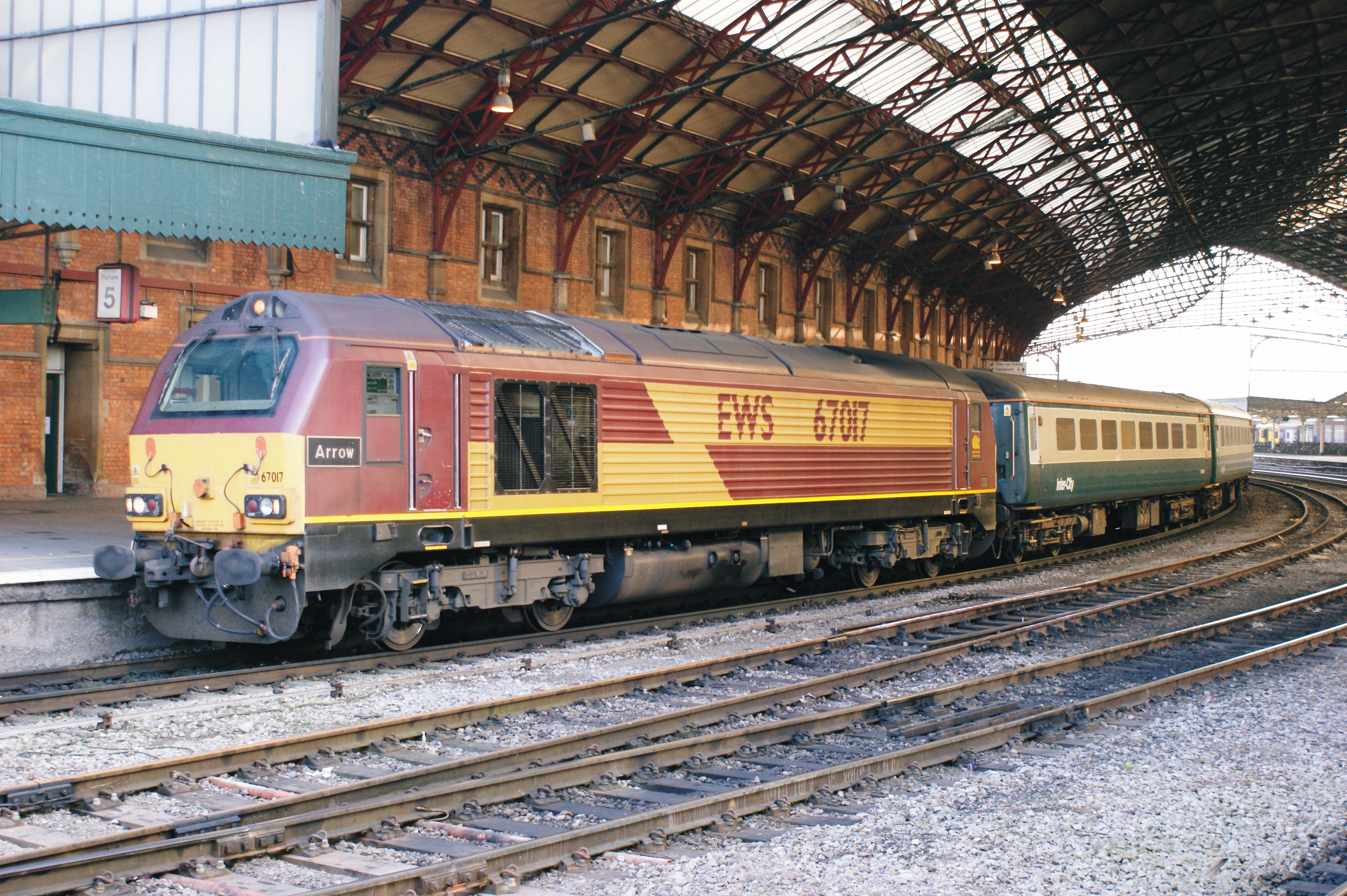
Class 67 on a First Great Western service at Bristol Temple Meads station in April 2009

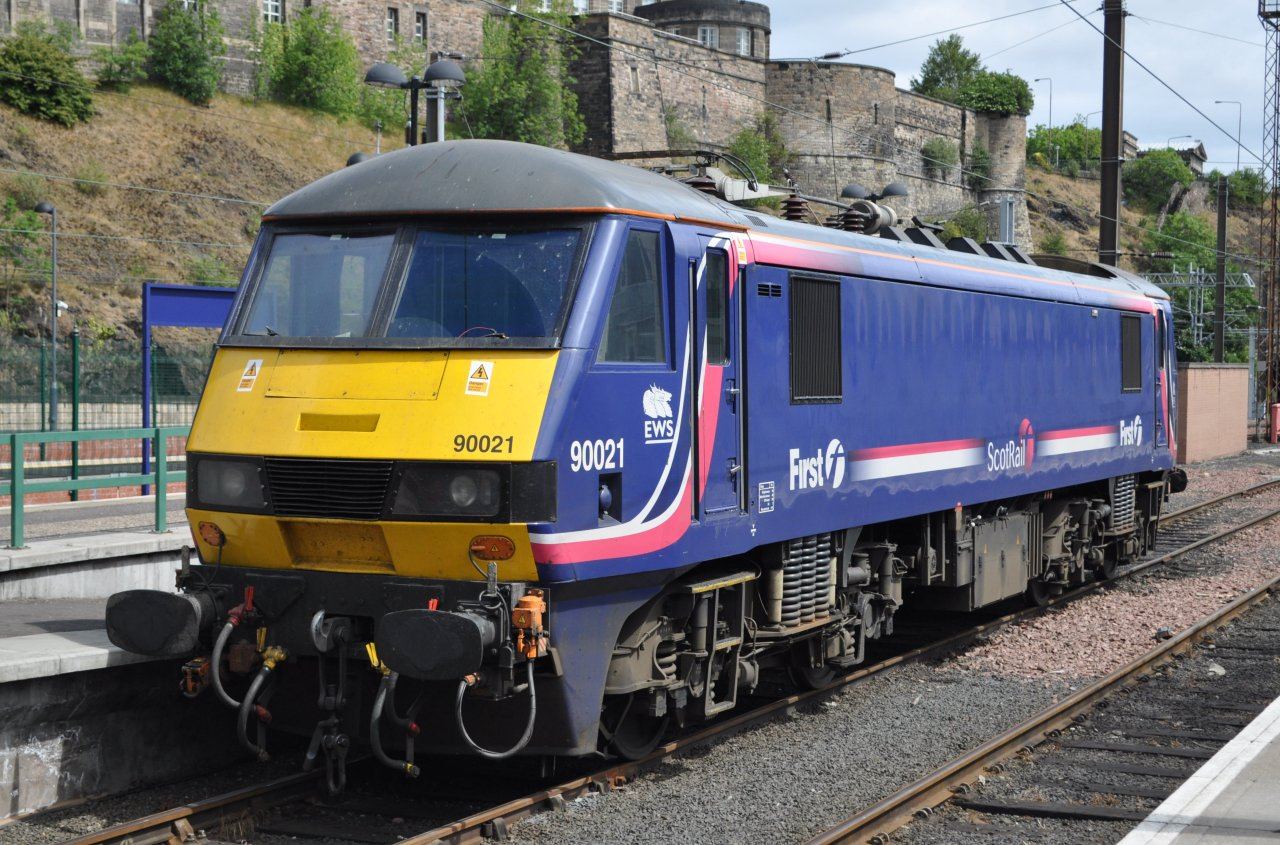
First ScotRail liveried Class 90 at Edinburgh Waverley station in June 2009

Since its inception, EWS had provided locomotives for the Caledonian Sleeper. It inherited the contract from Rail Express Systems to provide Class 37 and 47s north of Edinburgh Waverley. During March 1998, it also began hauling the services south from Edinburgh Waverley and Glasgow Central to London Euston with Class 90s. Class 67s replaced the Class 37s and 47s in the early 2000s. This contract was taken over by GBRf in March 2015.

During April 2003, EWS purchased the Rail Charter Services business from William McAlpine along with its 70 Mark 1 carriages.

By October 2014, EWS Class 67s had started hauling passenger services on behalf of Arriva Trains Wales, Chiltern Railways and First ScotRail. Class 67s are also used as Thunderbird rescue locomotives for London North Eastern Railway. EWS also provides locomotives for the Venice-Simplon Orient Express.

EWS have previously hauled passenger trains for Anglia Railways, Arriva Trains Northern, First Great Western First North Western, National Express East Anglia, Valley Lines, Virgin CrossCountry Virgin West Coast and Wrexham & Shropshire.

Since its inception, EWS has held the contract to operate the Royal Train. Initially, two Class 47s were dedicated to this work; these were replaced in 2004 by a pair of Class 67s.

From September 2016, Virgin Trains East Coast hired class 90 locomotives from DB Cargo for use on services to Leeds, York and Newcastle. Locomotives used have varied as demand required.

==== Liveries ====
During April 1996, EWS adopted a maroon and yellow livery. Initial repaints carried EW&S lettering, however, this was simplified to EWS in January 1997. In January 2009, the DB Schenker corporate red livery was adopted. A few locomotives have been repainted in other liveries including Class 90s in GNER, First ScotRail and Direct Rail Services liveries, and Class 67s in Royal Train, Wrexham & Shropshire and unbranded Arriva Trains Wales liveries.

== Steam operations ==
Alongside DB Cargo's regular operations, a number of steam charters are operated in the UK by steam locomotives on DB Cargo's operating licence.

Number	Name	Class	Livery	Owner	TOPS No.	Mainline until	Max Speed	Air Brakes	Location	Photograph	Status	Notes
2007	Prince of Wales	LNER P2 2-8-2	N/A	A1 Steam Locomotive Trust	988##	–	75 mph	Yes	Darlington		Under overhaul / restoration / construction	Original shape newbuild, next member of class
5029	Nunney Castle	GWR "Castle" 4-6-0	N/A	Jeremy Hosking	98728	–	75 mph	Yes	Crewe LNWR		Under overhaul / restoration / construction	
6024	King Edward I	GWR "King" 4-6-0	N/A	Royal Scot Locomotive and General Trust	98824	–	75 mph	Yes	Minehead		Under overhaul / restoration / construction	
34046	Braunton	SR "West Country" 4-6-2	BR Green, Late Crest	Jeremy Hosking	98746	2023	75 mph	Yes	Crewe LNWR		Operational	
35028	Clan Line	SR "Merchant Navy" 4-6-2	BR Green, Late Crest	Merchant Navy Locomotive Preservation Society	98828	–	75 mph	Yes	Stewarts Lane		Operational	Operational as of April 2024
46100	Royal Scot	LMS "Royal Scot" 4-6-0	BR Green, Early Emblem	Royal Scot Locomotive and General Trust	98701	2022	75 mph	Yes	Crewe LNWR		Operational	
6233	Duchess of Sutherland	LMS "Princess Coronation" 4-6-2	LMS Crimson Lake	Princess Royal Class Loco. Trust	98834	2025	75 mph	Yes	York NRM		Operational	
60007	Sir Nigel Gresley	LNER A4 4-6-2	BR Blue	Sir Nigel Gresley Locomotive Trust	98898	–	75 mph	Yes	York NRM		Mainline / Preservation (Operational)	
60009	Union of South Africa	LNER A4 4-6-2	BR Green, Late Crest	John Cameron	98809	–	75 mph	Yes	York NRM		Expired Mainline Certificate / Withdrawn from Service / Stored	
4464	Bittern	LNER A4 4-6-2	LNER Garter Blue	Jeremy Hosking	98819	–	75 mph	Yes	Margate		Expired Mainline Certificate / Withdrawn from Service / Stored	Recently moved to the Hornby Hobbies Visitor Centre for temporary display.
60103	Flying Scotsman	LNER A3 4-6-2	BR Green, Late Crest	National Collection	98872	2023	75 mph	Yes	York NRM		Operational, Heritage Railway/Museum	
60163	Tornado	LNER A1 4-6-2	BR Brunswick Green	A1 Steam Locomotive Trust	98863	2022	90 mph	Yes	Redmire		Operational, Heritage Railway/Museum	
60532	Blue Peter	LNER A2 4-6-2	N/A	Royal Scot Locomotive and General Trust	98832	–	75 mph	Yes (Post Overhaul)	Crewe LNWR		Under overhaul / restoration / construction	
70000	Britannia	BR Standard Class 7 4-6-2	BR Green, Late Crest	Royal Scot Locomotive and General Trust	98700	2020	75 mph	Yes	Crewe LNWR		Operational	
71000	Duke of Gloucester	BR Standard Class 8 4-6-2	BR Green, Early Emblem (on completion)	Class 8 Steam Locomotive Trust	98802	–	75 mph	Yes	Tyseley LW		Under overhaul / restoration / construction	To be based at Tyseley following overhaul

== See also ==
- DB Cargo Company Train
- History of rail transport in Great Britain
- List of companies operating trains in the United Kingdom
- Rail freight transport in Great Britain
