= SR Merchant Navy Class 35028 Clan Line =

Preserved 4-6-2 British steam locomotive

35028 Clan Line
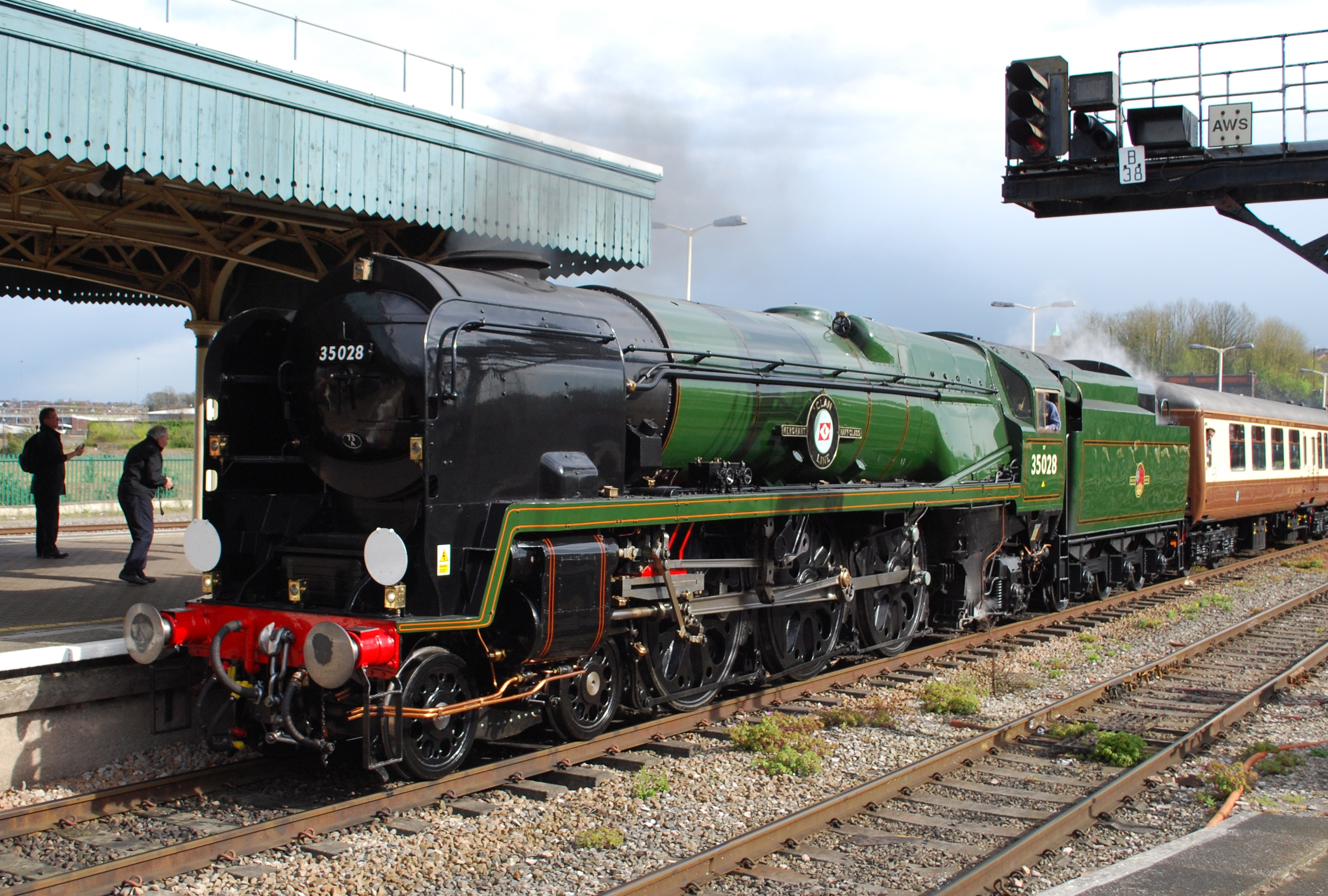
- Clan Line in 2012
Type and origin
- Power type: Steam
- Builder: Eastleigh Works
- Build date: December 1948
- Rebuild date: October 1959
Specifications
- Configuration
  - Whyte: 4-6-2
- Gauge: 4 ft 8 1/2 in (1,435 mm)
- Driver dia.: 6 ft 2 in (1.88 m)
- Wheelbase: 61 ft 6 in (18.75 m)
- Length: 71 ft 7¾ in (21.84 m)
- Total weight: 94 tons 15 cwt (96,270 kg, c. 212,240 lb)
- Boiler pressure: 280 psi (19.31 bar; 1.93 MPa), later reduced to 250 psi (17.24 bar; 1.72 MPa)
- Cylinders: 3
- Cylinder size: 18 in bore x 24 in stroke (457 x 610 mm)
- Loco brake: Air
Performance figures
- Tractive effort: 33,495 lbf (149.0 kN) (previously 37,515 lbf (166.9 kN))
Career
- Operators: British Railways
- Class: Merchant Navy
- Power class: SR: A; BR: 8P
- Numbers: SR 21C28; BR 35028
- Official name: Clan Line
- Withdrawn: July 1967
- Restored: October 2006
- Current owner: Merchant Navy Locomotive Preservation Society
- Disposition: Operational, Mainline Certified

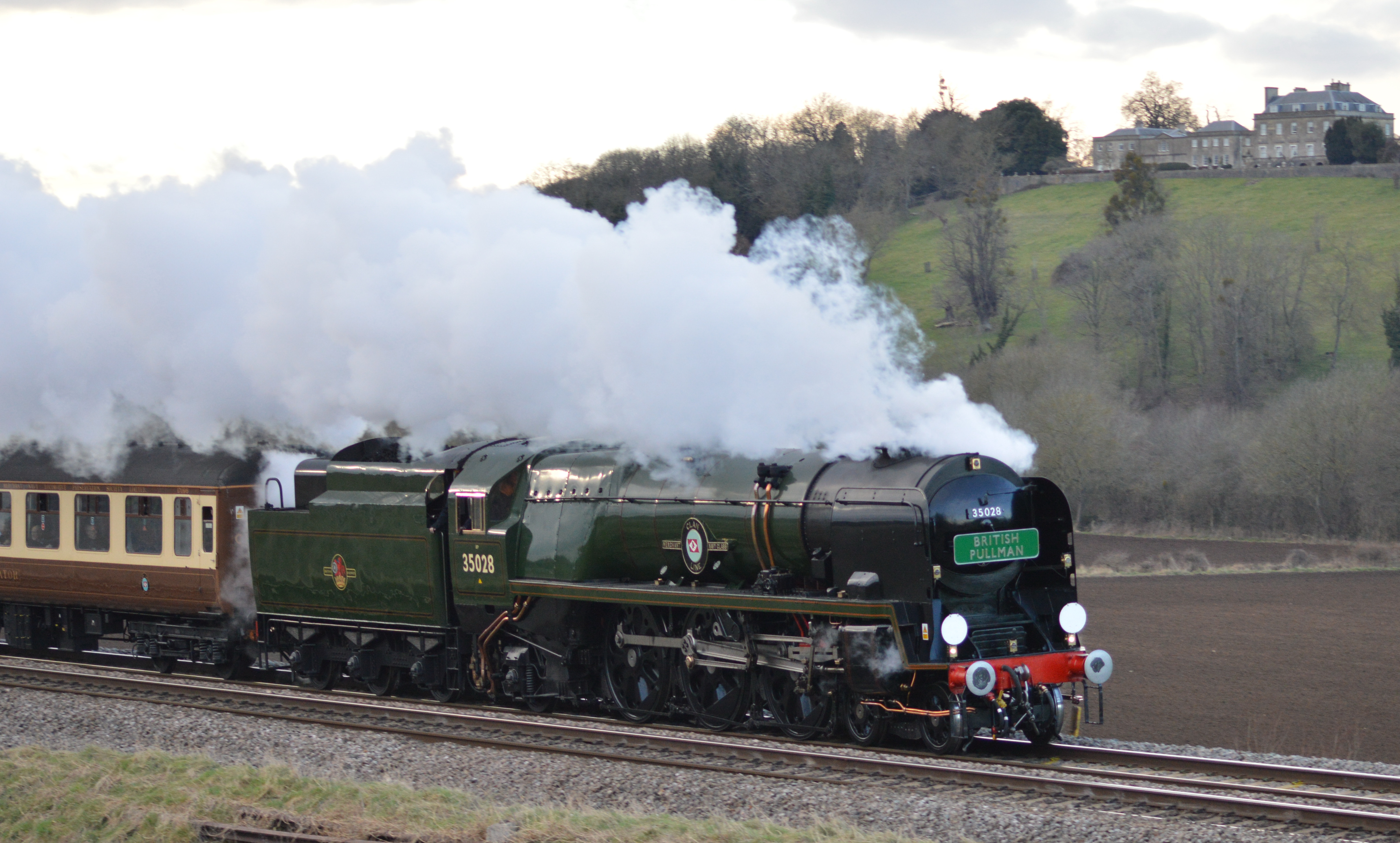
35028 Clan Line in 2013

SR Merchant Navy Class 35028 Clan Line is a Southern Railway rebuilt Merchant Navy 4-6-2 class locomotive. This historic steam locomotive pulls excursion trains about once a month in southern England.

== History ==
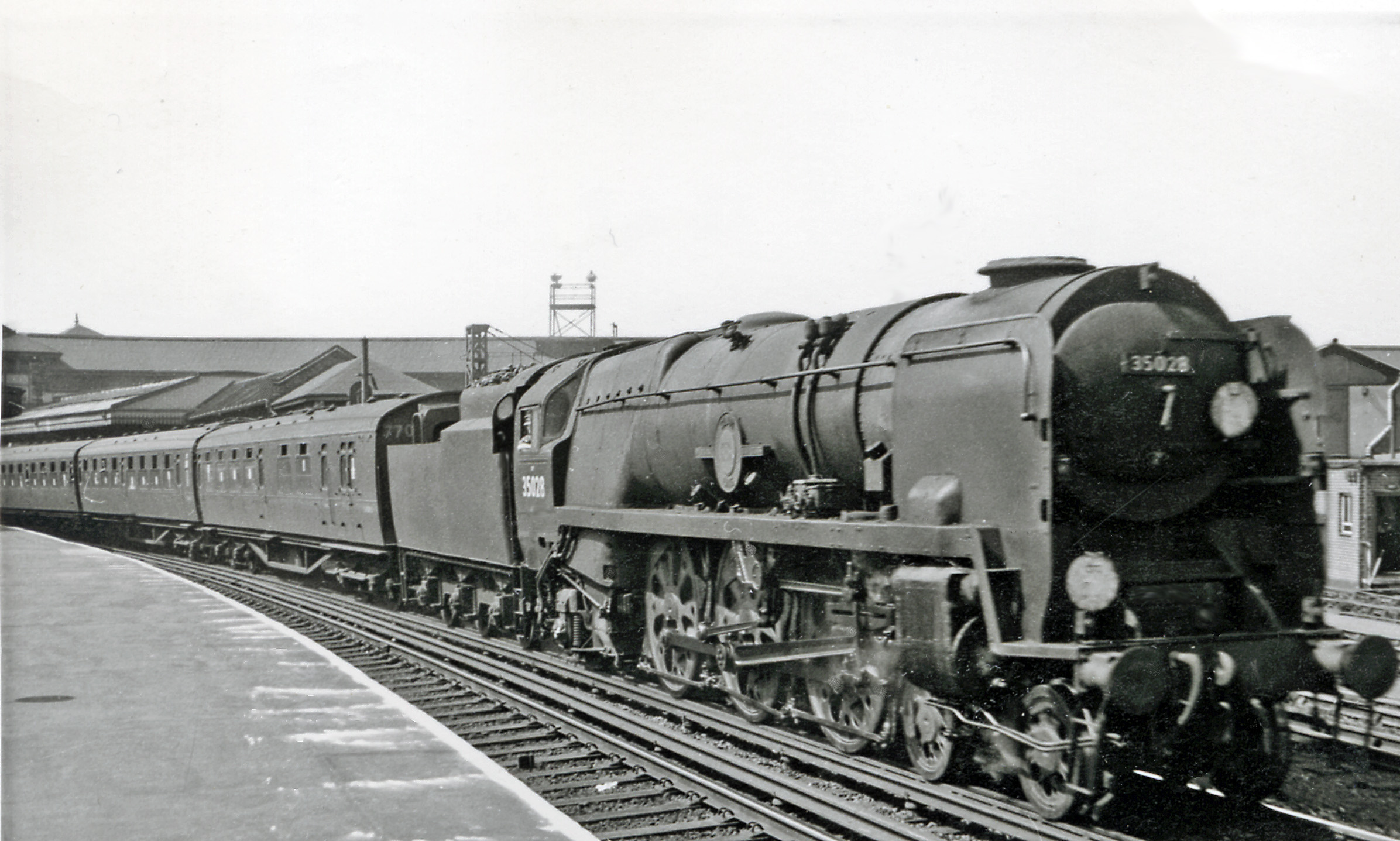
35028 Clan Line at Clapham Junction in 1966

=== British Railways ===
35028 was built at Eastleigh Works in 1948. After a few weeks running in, it was allocated first to Dover and then to Stewarts Lane shed in London, from where it worked heavy trains on the trunk routes to the South East Channel ports, frequently working the prestige expresses, Golden Arrow and the Night Ferry.

After rebuilding in 1959, it was initially allocated to Nine Elms shed, from where it headed such trains as the Bournemouth Belle and the Atlantic Coast Express. While working the latter in 1961, it was unofficially timed at 104 mph (167 km/h) passing Axminster.

On 2 July 1967, Clan Line hauled a farewell special from London Waterloo to Bournemouth and back. This ended its British Railways career.

=== Preservation ===
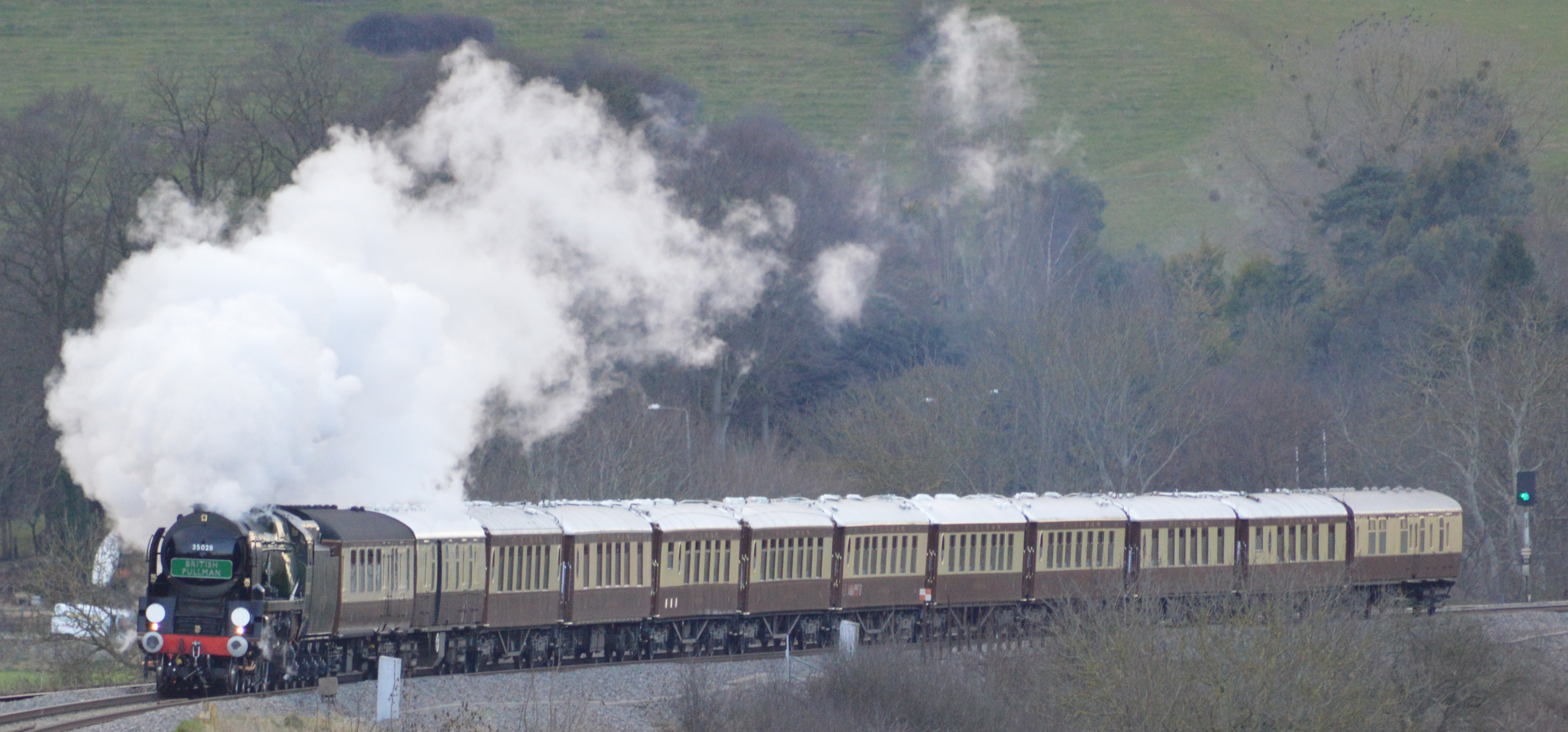
35028 Clan Line hauling the Belmond British Pullman in 2013, west of Bath

One month after finishing the farewell special, Clan Line was bought by the Merchant Navy Locomotive Preservation Society from British Railways for £3,850. The group had wanted 35022 Holland America Line, but it was sent to Woodham Brothers scrapyard in South Wales, before they could purchase it, so the group purchased Clan Line instead. Clan Line was one of the first preserved locomotives to participate in steam specials, and in 1974 hauled its first revenue-earning train in preservation from Basingstoke to Westbury. Its sister engine 35022 Holland American Line was eventually rescued from Barry Scrapyard in 1986.

In the 1990s, 35028 Clan Line was chosen as the locomotive to haul the Belmond British Pullman using preserved Pullman carriages, with tours around Kent, Surrey, Oxford, Bath and Bristol. In September 1994, it was the first steam locomotive in the United Kingdom to be fitted with air brakes. In the early 2000s, when the locomotive went for overhaul, LNER Class A3 4472 Flying Scotsman took over those trains.

The locomotive returned to mainline operation in October 2006, when it resumed British Pullman duties and hauling the occasional enthusiast specials. In 2012, the locomotive was used on a number of Cathedrals Express trips, filling in for locomotives that were not available for the tours.

35028 Clan Line was the first Merchant Navy class locomotive to operate on the mainline in preservation.

On 7 December 2018, Clan Line hauled the British Royal Train, taking the Prince of Wales to Cardiff Central railway station.

=== Operations ===
As of January 2024, Clan Line is based at Stewarts Lane TMD, Battersea.

Clan Line is used on occasion pulling services run by Belmond British Pullman. These services involve journeys from London Victoria to Dover Priory.
