= Drop table =

Device used in railway engine maintenance

External images
- A drop pit and simple drop table in use in South Africa in the early 20th century
- Drop pit and Drop table at Acca, Virginia, USA in the mid 1920s

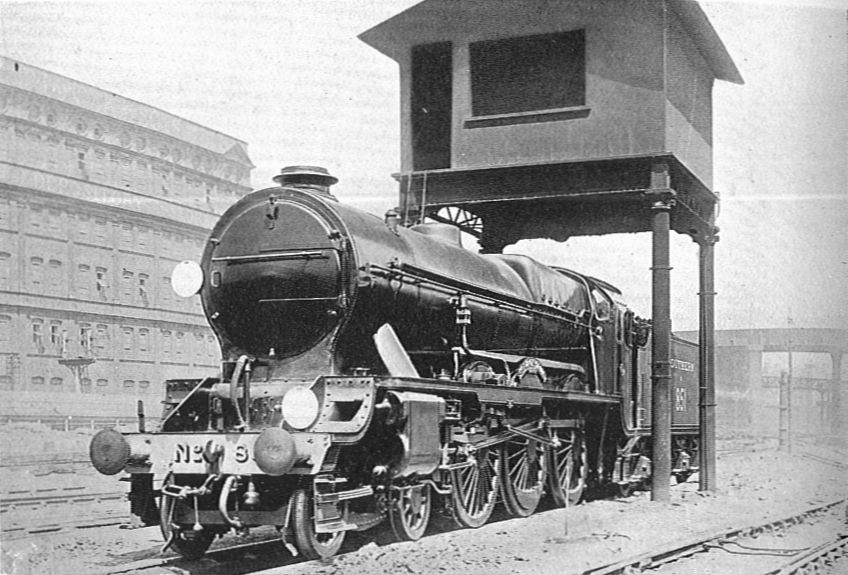
Lord Nelson class No. 851 Sir Francis Drake, at a drop table at Stewarts Lane, c. 1928.

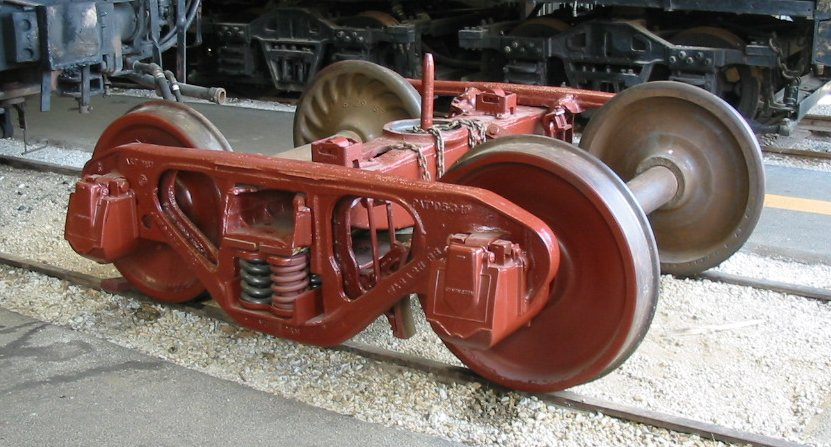
Two wheelsets in a North American (Bettendorf-style) freight bogie.

A drop table or wheel drop is a device used in railway engineering during maintenance jobs that require the removal of locomotive or rolling stock wheelsets. The machine is built in a drop pit allowing a locomotive or rolling stock to be rolled onto it, avoiding the need for heavy cranes or jacks to lift the vehicle off the rails.

The vehicle is placed over the drop table, and the connections attaching the wheelset to the vehicle are unfastened. This allows the wheel set to 'float' independently of the locomotive. The wheelset is lowered into the drop pit on a short section of rail, and a dummy rail, normally a part of the drop table machinery, is then inserted in the gap over the lowered wheelset. This enables the vehicle to be moved clear of the drop table on its remaining wheels, so that the removed wheelset can then be lifted out of the drop pit for maintenance work to be performed on it.
