= SR Merchant Navy Class 35022 Holland America Line =

35022 Holland America Line
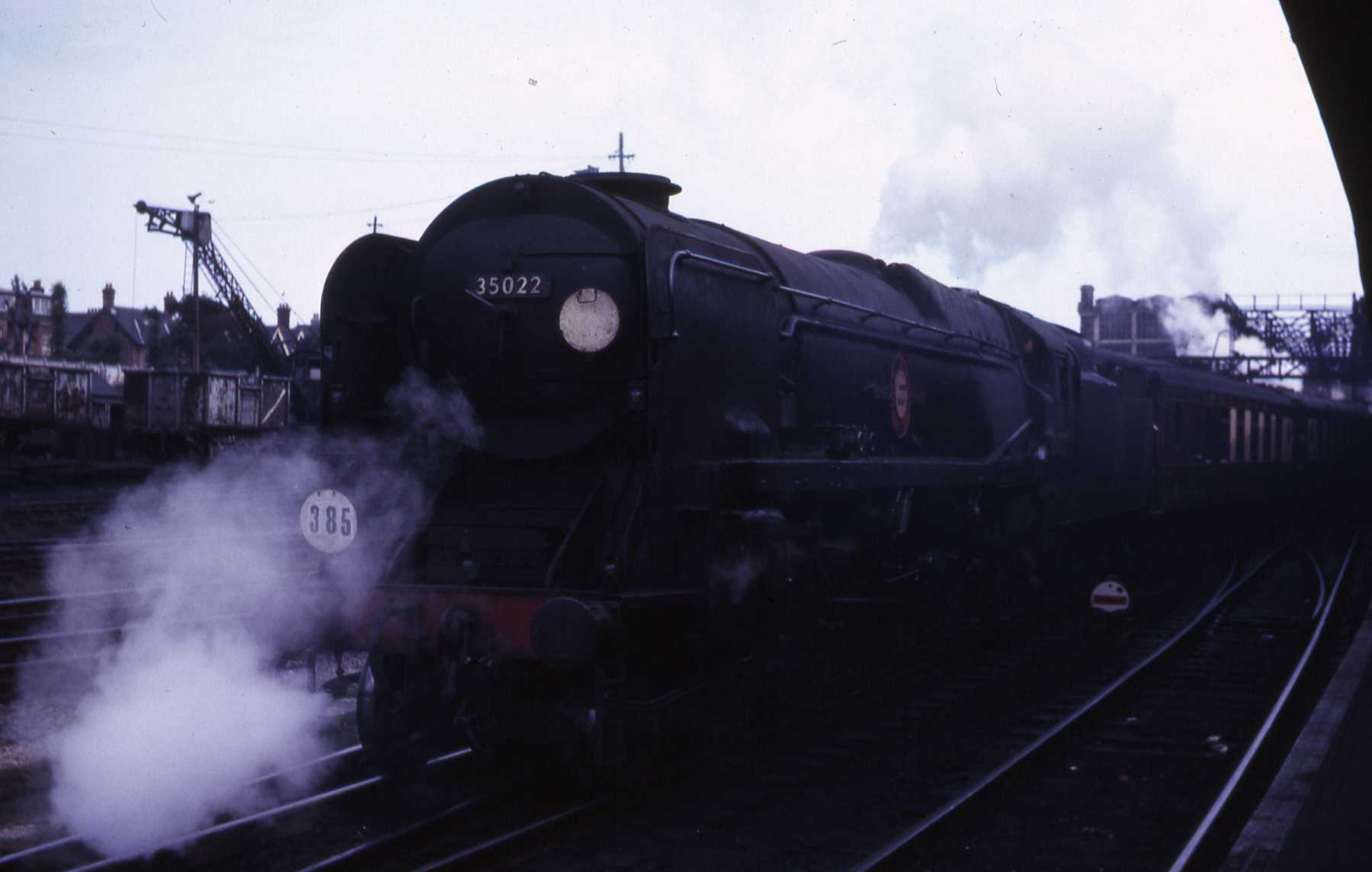
- 35022 at Bournemouth with "The Bournemouth Belle" in 1965
Type and origin
- Power type: Steam
- Builder: Eastleigh Works
- Build date: October 1948
Specifications
- Configuration
  - Whyte: 4-6-2
- Gauge: 4 ft 8 1/2 in (1,435 mm)
- Driver dia.: 6 ft 2 in (1.88 m)
- Wheelbase: 61 ft 6 in (18.75 m)
- Length: 71 ft 7¾ in (21.84 m)
- Total weight: 94 tons 15 cwt (96,270 kg, c. 212,240 lb)
- Boiler pressure: 280 psi (19.31 bar; 1.93 MPa), later reduced to 250 psi (17.24 bar; 1.72 MPa)
- Cylinders: 3
- Cylinder size: 18 in bore x 24 in stoke (457 x 610 mm)
- Loco brake: Vacuum
Performance figures
- Tractive effort: 33,495 lbf (149.0 kN) (previously 37,515 lbf (166.9 kN))
Career
- Operators: British Railways
- Class: Merchant Navy
- Power class: SR: A, BR: 8P
- Numbers: SR 21C22; BR 35022
- Official name: Holland America Line
- Withdrawn: May 1966
- Current owner: Royal Scot Locomotive and General Trust

35022 Holland America Line was one of the last batch of ten SR Merchant Navy class steam locomotives to be built, although a Southern Railway design it was built by British Railways.

Completed at Eastleigh Works in October 1948, Holland America Line was first shedded at Exmouth Junction until June 1954, when it was transferred to Bournemouth. Other shed allocations included Weymouth Radipole and Nine Elms. 35022 was withdrawn from service in May 1966 after a working life of just 17 years, and was sold to Woodham Brothers scrapyard in Barry, South Wales.

== Preservation ==
In 1983, it was purchased by "The Southern Steam Trust" for preservation and was moved to Swanage where a restoration to running order was to take place; however, restoration was never started and as of 2025, it is now owned by "Royal Scot Locomotive and General Trust" and is stored at Crewe awaiting restoration to mainline condition.
