= Intermodal railfreight in Great Britain =

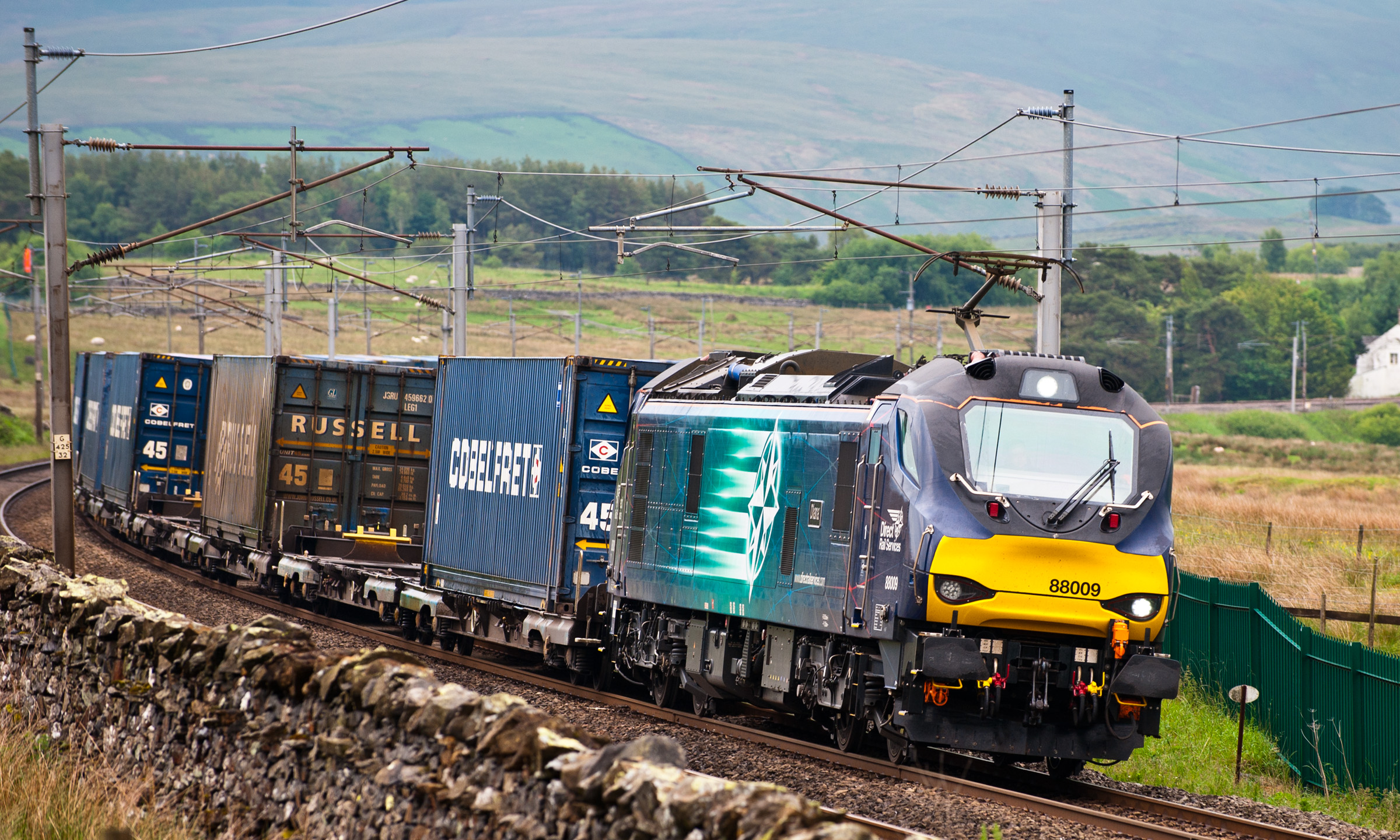
88009 at Scout Green with a Daventry to Mossend intermodal train

Intermodal railfreight in Great Britain is a way of transporting containers between ports, inland ports and terminals in England, Scotland and Wales, by using rail to do so. Initially started by British Rail in the 1960s, the use of containers that could be swapped between different modes of transport goes back to the days of the London, Midland & Scottish Railway.

The transport of containers from ship to rail is classified by the UK government as Lo-Lo traffic (lift-on, lift-off). Volumes of intermodal traffic in the United Kingdom have been rising since 1998, with an expectation of further growth in the years ahead; by 2017, railfreight was moving one in four of containers that entered the United Kingdom. (Note: Geographically, this includes Northern Ireland, however, the term Great Britain, refers only to England, Scotland and Wales, or, occasionally, to the mainland United Kingdom. As it is perceived that containers are not moved in Northern Ireland by rail, the 25% share of containers moved by Railfreight must be within the mainland UK only.) However, the movement of containers through the Channel Tunnel has been labelled as disappointing, but this has suffered myriad problems such as migrant issues and safety problems. Since privatisation of the railways in the 1990s, the market has grown from one initial operator (Freightliner), to four main operators, DB Cargo, Direct Rail Services and GB Railfreight, although other entrants have tried to run intermodal trains.

Many of the older terminals opened by British Rail have closed down, with a governmental push towards strategic rail freight interchanges (SRFIs), which will focus on a wider area or region with good onward road, or water, transport links.

== History ==
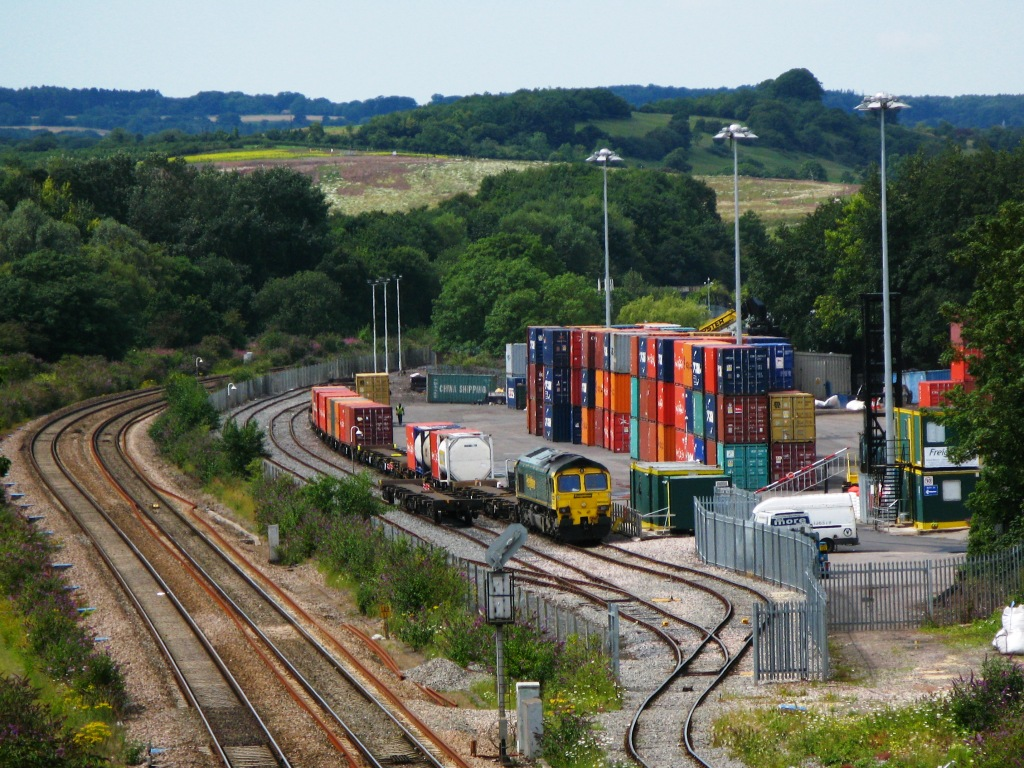
Bristol Freightliner Terminal, which ceased to be used by intermodal trains in 2019

As a transfer container service, Freightliner was set up by British Rail as a separate company, with the first train running in November 1965. It was one of the reformative ideas put forward under the aegis of Richard Beeching as part of the rationalisation of the railway network in the 1960s. The idea of trains moving containers pre-dated the Beeching cuts, with some suggestions being put forward in the 1950s when the railway was under the control of the British Transport Commission. In the 1950s, British Rail ran a Condor service (an Anglo-Scottish container train that ran on two axle-wagons). The first service of Condor containers ran in March 1959, consisting of roller-bearing flat wagons that containers could be moved on and off with ease.

Even further back, the swapping of containers between modes of transport was utilised in the 19th century, when wooden containers were used, but after the railways were grouped in 1921, the London Midland & Scottish Railway (LMS) introduced this type of system with steel and aluminium containers.

Initially, the new Freightliner service was intended for the domestic movement of freight in containers between points in the Great Britain, with 16 terminals in operation in 1968, and Southampton and Tilbury under construction. However, in 1968 a London to Paris working was started which relied upon the Dover to Dunquerke train ferry, and by 1969, the service was linked into ports with a short-sea and a deep-sea service to other countries. By the end of the 1960s, liner trains (united transport) were carrying 12,900,000 tonnes (14,200,000 tons) per year. By the end of 1978, this average was 39,300,000 tonnes (43,300,000 tons). In 1969, British Rail transferred ownership of Freightliner to the National Freight Corporation, but with BR supplying the wagons and locomotives. It was returned to BR in 1978.

By 1981, Freightliner was operating to 43 terminals, 25 of their own and 18 privately used locations. In 1982, the Port of Felixstowe was despatching three daily freight trains with containers on. In 1983, a second terminal opened (Felixstowe North), and between the two terminals, the amount of containers transhipped to and from rail was about 80,000 per year (20%). When a third terminal was opened in 2013 (named Felixstowe North, with the previous one being renamed Felixstowe Central), over 40 million TEUs (twenty-foot equivalent units) with 36 daily departures carrying containers were being handled. In 1986 and 1987, several terminals were closed, including four in Scotland (Aberdeen, Clydeport [Greenock], Dundee and Edinburgh) despite the potential for long-distance services from these terminals. British Rail deemed it more efficient to load containers at Coatbridge in Glasgow, and use electric traction south on the West Coast Main Line. Before the closures, Freightliner operated 35 terminals, including ports, compared with 19 under privatisation.

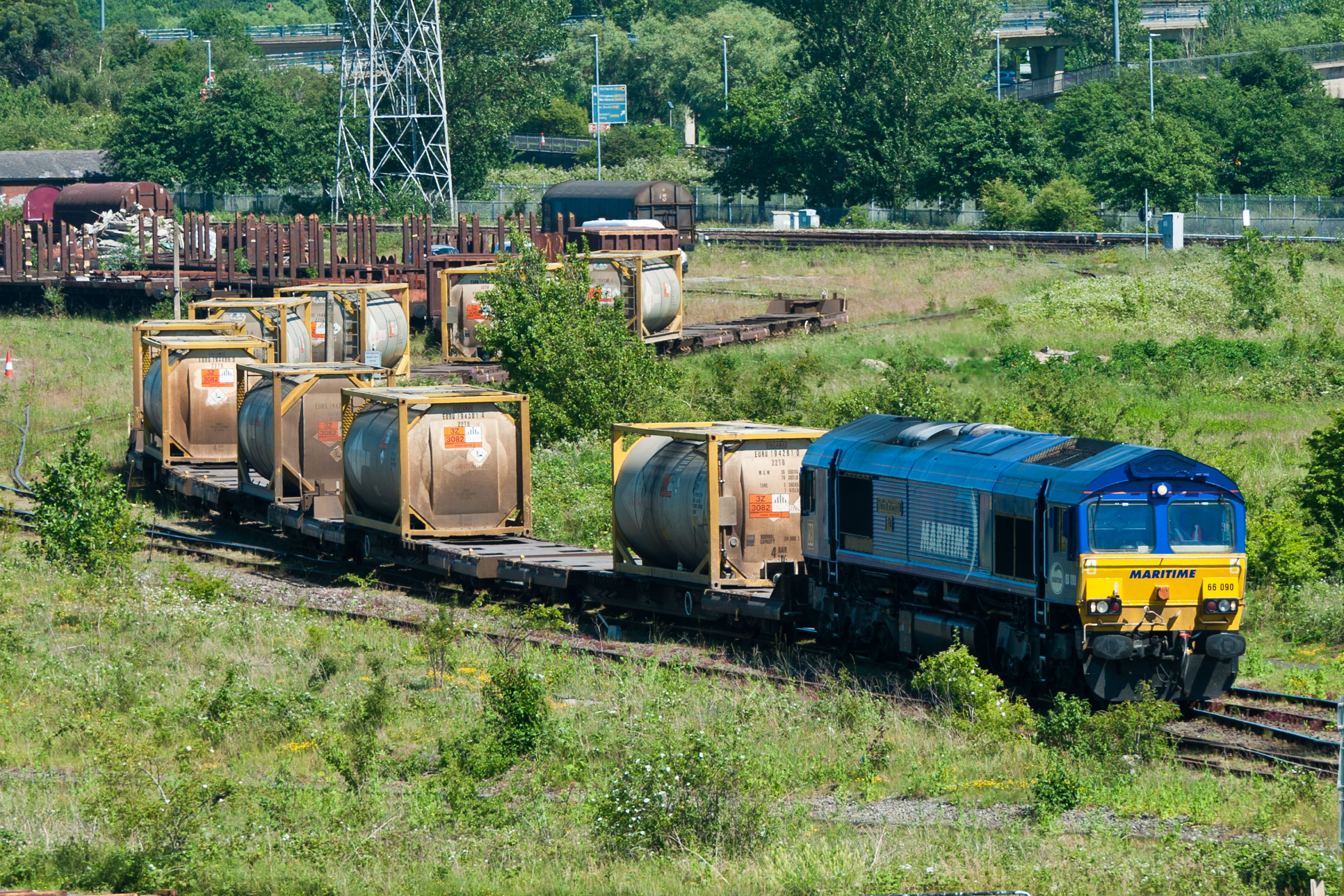
66090 winding through Tees Yard with a containerised chemicals train bound for Grangemouth

In 1988, Freightliner, Speedlink and Railfreight International, were amalgamated into one entity by British Rail, called Railfreight Distribution. A large section of the business that these three separate arms dealt with, were loss-making and the combined efforts were a way in which it was hoped to turn the businesses around. In 1992, it was assessed that Freightliner was making a 50% loss on its £70 million turnover, and the business was only serving nine locations. One of the problems causing this was that the deep-sea nature of the traffic carried was increasingly geared up to using the 9-foot-6-inch (2.90 m) containers, which required gauge enhancement or specially adapted wagons to be carried on the British railway system.

The advent of the Channel Tunnel opening, led to a resurgence in container traffic terminals being opened. These were separated into sites away from the main railfreight business as operated between UK terminals and deep-sea ports such as Southampton and Felixstowe. New European freight terminals were built at Trafford Park in Manchester, Wakefield in West Yorkshire and Willesden in North West London. After this, the intermodal services in Britain could be subdivided into three streams; traffic to and from ports, Channel Tunnel traffic and domestic flows, of which much Anglo-Scottish traffic falls into the latter. This is a complete modal shift of the domestic nature of the Freightliner network as instigated in the mid 1960s which initially envisaged the market being domestic traffic dominating. One suggestion for the change in traffic origin has been that containers entering ports have a lower transport cost, as they only need onward road transport to their final destination, as opposed to the domestic traffic which needs to be road-hauled, railed and then road-hauled again.

The opening of Daventry International Rail Freight Terminal (DIRFT) in July 1997, heralded another new venture into the intermodal business. The site is located on the Northampton Loop of the West Coast Main Line, and close to the M1 motorway and the A45 road. The land had been designated as a "motorway orientated growth point" in 1978, and so was ideally situated for this type of interchange and delivery point for intermodal traffic. In 1997, services through the Channel Tunnel operated between Birmingham Landor Street, Daventry, Mossend, Seaforth, Trafford Park, Wakefield and Willesden in the United Kingdom, with terminals in Europe (Avignon, Barcelona, Lyon, Melzo, Metz, Muizen, Novara, Oleggio, Paris, Perpignan, Rogoredo and Turin). Even so, the volumes of intermodal traffic (and other commodities) shifted by railfreight through the channel Tunnel have been low compared with forecasted freight volumes. (Note: Railfreight as a whole, had been projected to be carrying over 6,000,000 tonnes (6,600,000 tons) of freight per year by 1997, but in reality less than half that was being carried.) Whilst some problems range from the physical; migrants using the services to cross and at one point, invading the railway yard at Frethun, other problems have been strikes by French workers and fires in the tunnel which hampered pathing trains through. (Note: Delays were typically around several months; after the 2008 fire, the tunnel was closed for five months.)

=== Binliners and other traffic ===
Binliners are so named because they carry waste traffic in containers on the same type of wagons used to carry (freight)liner trains, (binliner being a portmanteau of the words bin and liner, so it sounds like a binliner).

The carrying of waste on the railway network, used to involve slow moving wagons, but in the 1970s, terminals began opening which would take compacted waste in containers direct to a landfill site. Whilst this traffic is not routinely grouped under the intermodal umbrella, its use of containers makes it an intermodal railfreight service, even if no onward road transport was used at the destination. Most binliners would run as block trains, but occasional special traffics would be railed to its final destination via the wagonload network, such as spent shot blast from Falmouth to Brindle Heath in Greater Manchester.

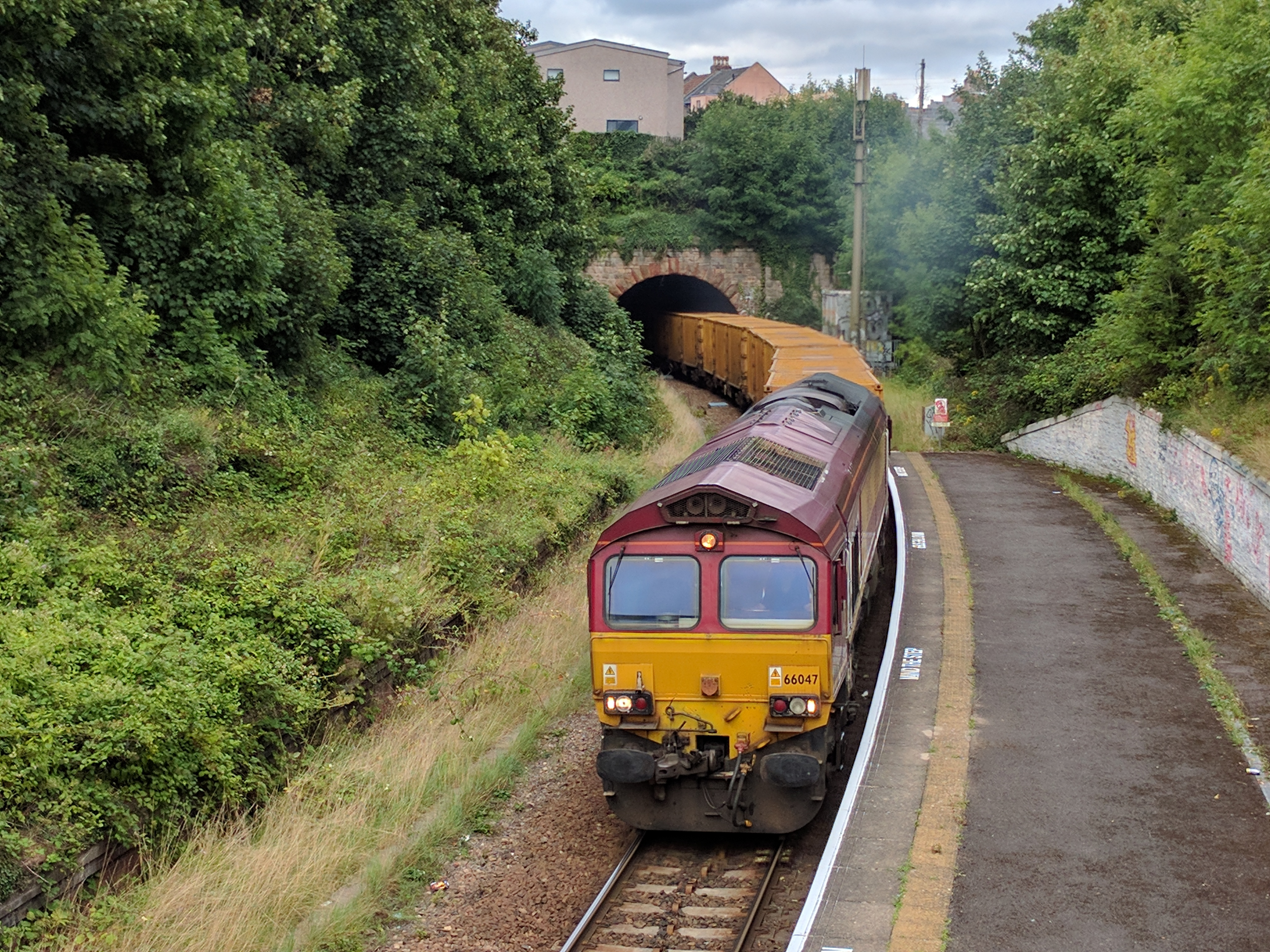
A binliner train at Montpelier station, bound for Severnside EfW

Most destinations were former quarrying or mining operations that had applications to take landfill. The main sites were at Forders in Bedfordshire, Calvert in Buckinghamshire, Appleford in Oxfordshire, Roxby Gullet in Lincolnshire and Appley Bridge in Greater Manchester. The main authorities using these sites were Greater London for Forders and Calvert, Avon for Calvert and Appleford, with Greater Manchester utilising first Appley Bridge, then Roxby when Appley Bridge was full. A similar operation was used on the Powderhall Branch in Edinburgh, which used to take compacted waste to exhausted quarry workings at the cement works at Oxwellmains in the Scottish Borders.

As an adaptation of the binliner trains, a landfill tax introduced in the 2010s, prompted some authorities to send their waste to be burnt in an energy from waste plant (EfW). Merseyside waste is burnt at the Wilton EfW plant, and some waste from London (loaded at Brentford) is burnt at the Severnside EfW plant.

Other commodities have been sent via containers such as desulphogypsum from power stations to gypsum processing plants, however, the containers are used solely for this purpose and not used as a generic swap container service available for different goods. Containers are used on the desulphogypsum traffic as it is sticky, so the use of hopper wagons would not work, and the use of tippler wagons would have been more expensive.

== Rail versus other modes ==
In many areas of freight transport, rail loses out to road (or water transport), typically in smaller consists which has led to the demise of the wagonload network in Great Britain due to the small tonnages involved. Many containers are transferred between ports in Britain by water transport, mostly at sea using coastal shipping, but some on the canal or river systems. In 2018, the movement of Ro-Ro shipping traffic (which accounts for containers transported by sea, instead of the sea to land designation, which is Lo-Lo), equated to 3.3 billion tonne kilometres, in and around the United Kingdom. Even so, one of four containers that enter the United Kingdom, are then transported/part transported onwards by the use of railfreight.

Where rail transport has been beneficial, it has been over long distances such as Felixstowe to Coatbridge (Glasgow). Short distance flows are deemed uneconomic unless they can either be back filled, or be given a guaranteed full load on each train. An example of this was the Wilton to Doncaster Railport service in the 1990s/early 2000s, which carried containerised chemicals a distance of just 85 miles (137 km). A similar service operates between Tees Dock and Doncaster iPort, which has an out and back run of only 200 miles (320 km), and as such, the train and locomotive can be utilised twice in one day, making greater use of the resources. A service between Grangemouth on the Firth of Forth, and Elderslie in Renfrewshire, travelled a distance of only 43 miles (69 km) in the one direction. Whilst it normally loaded to 100% going eastbound (from Elderslie), it was only very lightly loaded westbound (from Grangemouth). However, its ability to deliver containers the short distance and avoid the congested M8, M80, M876 and M9 motorways, meant that it afforded customers a better transit time. The wagons and locomotive were used on additional freight services in between its intermodal run.

The movement of railfreight is measured in net tonne kilometres (NTK). The figures for intermodal railfreight between 1998 and 2018 are given below. Between 1975 and 1995, the NTK for intermodal traffic steadily decreased from 3.1 billion to 2.3 billion. Post 1996 (privatisation of the railfreight companies), this has seen a steady rise.

Railfreight stats 1998–2018 in the United Kingdom

Railfreight intermodal by billion net tonne kilometres (NTK)
Date	Intermodal	All railfreight
1998–99	3.5	18.2
1999–00	3.9	18.1
2000–01	3.7	19.4
2001–02	3.5	18.5
2002–03	3.4	18.9
2003–04	3.5	20.3
2004–05	4.0	21.7
2005–06	4.4	21.9
2006–07	4.7	21.2
2007–08	5.1	20.6
2008–09	5.2	19.1
2009–10	5.5	19.2
2010–11	5.7	21.1
2011–12	6.3	21.5
2012–13	6.3	22.7
2013–14	6.2	22.2
2014–15	6.5	17.8 (Note: The drop in billion tonne kilometres was attributed to the large-scale loss of coal transported by rail in the United Kingdom.)
2015–16	6.4	17.2
2016–17	6.8	17.0
2017–18	6.7	17.4
2018-19	6.8	17.4
2019-20	6.8	16.6
2020-21	6.3	15.2
2021-22	6.5	16.9
2022-23	6.3	15.7
2023-24	6.5	15.8
2024-25	7.1	16.6

== Operational enhancements ==
Constraints on the movement of containers across the UK rail network have been the loading gauge of the railway lines themselves, with most lines being able to accommodate 8 feet 6 inches (2.59 m) containers. Only a few lines can handle the larger 9-foot-6-inch (2.90 m) containers which has led to some lines being adapted to accept the larger gauge, while other routes have used 'pocket' wagons, where the container sits lower down in the wagon. Due to the steady year-on-year increase of intermodal traffic volumes, Network Rail, the owner and infrastructure manager of the UK rail network, has undertaken a series of schemes to allow easier pathing and the removal of gauge restrictions on core routes across the network.

Additionally, due to the increase in billion tonne kilometres travelled, and intermodal slowly gaining a larger market share of railfreight tonnage moved, there have been several key network enhancement operations to enable smoother running of intermodal trains. Outside of the development of SRFI's and general improvements in terminals and ports, the key programmes are listed below.

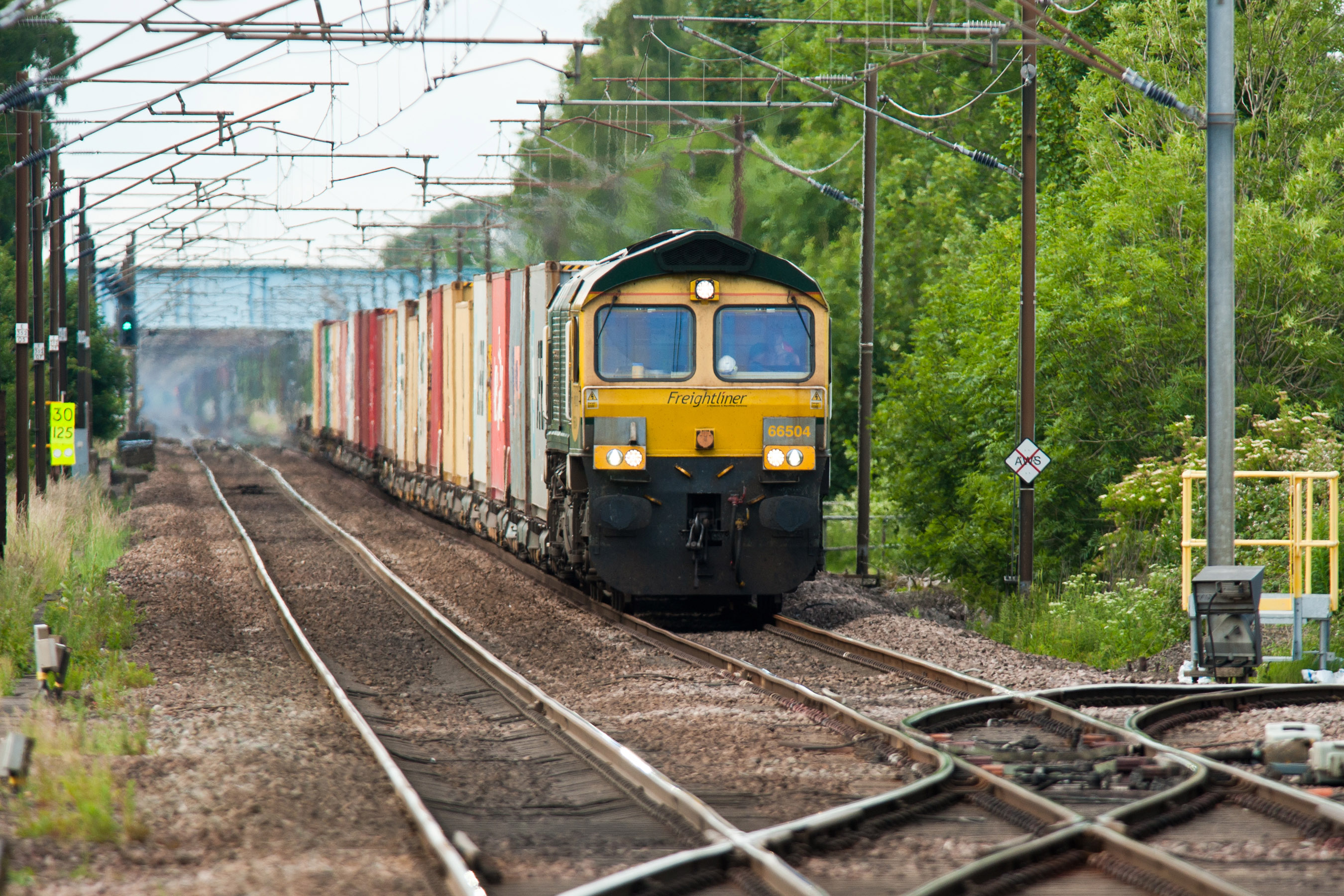
66504 heading south at Northallerton with a Teesport to Felixstowe service. This service has had to go via Darlington railway station and then head south, rather than take the direct route via Yarm due to Northallerton-Eaglescliffe line not being engineered to W12 standards. The direct line through Yarm joins in the right foreground.

- 2000 (onwards) - Felixstowe branch line - a programme of engineering works to improve pathing availability on what was largely a single-track branch line in the early days of privatisation. The 2019 engineering works saw a new passing loop installed to a length of 1.4 kilometres (0.87 mi). The electrification of the line between Felixstowe and Ipswich is designated as a "priority route(s) to support electrification of railfreight services."
- 2004 - Ipswich tunnel enhancement - work to lower the floor of the tunnel, thus allowing 9 feet 6 inches (2.90 m) containers to be carried through the tunnel. This was part of a wider £30 million Strategic Rail Authority programme to enhance the gauge between Felixstowe and Birmingham via London.
- 2010–2011 - Gauge enhancement on the route between Southampton and the West Midlands.
- 2012 - Nuneaton North Chord - previous to the chord being built at Nuneaton, freight trains had to cross the tracks on the flat at Nuneaton station. The new chord allows northbound trains to access the down line without conflicting movements of other trains on the busy West Coast Main Line.
- 2014 - Ipswich Chord - a 0.75-mile (1.21 km) new chord going from east to north allowing trains to access the Peterborough line from the Port of Felixstowe (and vice versa) without having to reverse in Ipswich yard.
- 2021 Werrington Dive Under - works undertaken at Werrington Junction north of Peterborough to allow freight trains to access/egress the Lincoln line and the March line without conflicting with fast passenger trains on the East Coast Main Line.
- 2030 (possible) - a gauge enhancement of the Northallerton–Eaglescliffe line to bring that line, the Stillington line and beyond to Newcastle to W12 gauge clearance.

Network Rail have other schemes in the proposal category that can affect intermodal traffic. One of these is known as the Castlefield corridor, a section of track between Castlefield Junction in West Manchester, and Manchester Picadilly railway station. Both Trafford Park intermodal terminals have east facing connections that lead onto the Castlefield Corridor, and so must traverse the bottleneck through Manchester Oxford Road and Manchester Piccadilly. After the Ordsall Chord opened in West Manchester, more trains were diverted to go through this bottleneck causing delays and cancellations, with Network Rail going so far as to label the 1-mile (1.6 km) stretch of line as "congested infrastructure".

Some suggestions have been to have a west facing connection to the intermodal terminals so that they can access the West Coast Main Line via a new curve in the Warrington area. Another proposal, put forward by Railfuture, is to relocate the Manchester intermodal terminals on the old Carrington Branch, and therefore freeing up paths through Castlefield for passenger trains, or to add flex to the operational capacity of the corridor.

== Open terminals ==
Name	Location	Open	Type	Notes	Refs
Barking/Ripple Lane	East London	1972	Terminal	Has had various container/intermodal uses, but is known for being the terminal for intermodal trains from China. Trains are cheaper than air and faster than sea transport.	
Basford Hall	Crewe	1992	Node	Basford Hall yard is used to swap portions of intermodal trains before onward delivery. The yard started providing a 'hub-and-spoke' service to the myriad of Freightliner trains passing through from 1992 onwards	
Birch Coppice	Polesworth	(2002) 2006 (Note: Opened in 2002 to general freight; four years later to intermodal traffic.)	Terminal	The terminal is located on the former Birch Coppice Colliery branch, and as it is not operated by a railfreight company, it has seen traffic hauled by DB Cargo, Freightliner and GBRf.	
DIRFT (I/II/III)	Daventry	1997/2005/2021	Terminal/Node	Daventry International Rail Freight Terminal. Has been expanded into DIRFT II, with DIRFT III projected for 2021.	
Ditton	Widnes	November 1998	Terminal	Opened on the site of a former British Oxygen Company terminal	
East Midlands Gateway	Castle Donington	2020 (Note: Opened for traffic in early 2020; officially opened 28 February 2020.)	Terminal		
Elderslie	Renfrewshire	2001	Terminal	Used as a general railfreight terminal, but most recently sees a three-way intermodal service between Doncaster iPort, Teesport and itself.	
Felixstowe	Suffolk	1972/1983/2013	Port (three sites)	Felixstowe intermodal railfreight handled over 900,000 TEUs in 2014	
Garston	Liverpool	1965	Terminal		
Grangemouth	Grangemouth	September 2000	Port/Terminal		
Hams Hall	Lea Marston	July 1997	Terminal		
iPort	Doncaster	2018	Terminal		
Inverness	Inverness	1997	Terminal	In 1997, the supermarket Safeway, launched a direct container/swapbody service between Mossend and Inverness. Whilst this service ceased in 2004, when Safeway were taken over by Morrisons, the terminal at Inverness still retained a container transfer service between the Highlands and the Central Belt of Scotland.	
Lawley Street	Birmingham	1969	Terminal	Traffic from Dudley was transferred here in 1986	
London Gateway	Thurrock	2013	Port/Terminal		
Maritime	Southampton	1972	Terminal/Port		
Millbrook	Southampton	January 1968	Terminal		
Port of Southampton	Southampton	2017	Port		
Port of Tilbury	Tilbury	1970	Port		
Purfleet	East London	May 1997			
Rotherham	South Yorkshire	2015	Terminal	Opened in 2015 as an alternative site to that at Selby. GBRf containers were all diverted to here instead of Selby.	
Rugby	Warwickshire		Terminal		
Seaforth	Liverpool	1979	Port/terminal	Services had ceased by 2008, but the terminal remained open for other port traffic. Intermodal trains were started again in 2018, mostly destined for Mossend.	
Stourton	Leeds, West Yorkshire	1967	Terminal		
Teesport	Teesport	2011 (Note: Containers have been transported from Teesport before this date, however, investment in a dedicated terminal was in 2011 and in again in 2014 when Freightliner transferred their operations from Wilton)	Port	Freightliner moved to this site in 2014, closing their previous site at Wilton at the same time. Other operators use Teesport, such as GBRf services to Doncaster iPort.	
Teesside Rail Intermodal Park (TRIP)	Middlesbrough	2013	Terminal		
Tilbury2 Port	East London	May 2020	Port	Newer port terminal which replaced TIRFT in 2020	
Trafford Park	Greater Manchester	1969	Terminal	Opened as a second terminal to Longsight, it became the main Freightliner depot in Manchester when operations at Longsight ceased in 1987.	
Trafford Park Euroterminal	Greater Manchester	1993	Terminal		
Wakefield Europort	West Yorkshire	1996	Terminal	Originally operated by EWS. has the capacity to handle 175,000 TEUs annually.	
Wembley (EFOC)	North London	1993	Node	Wembley European Freight Operating Centre; it was built on the former London North Western Railway Sudbury yard. Whilst it was designed with a capacity of 70 trains per day, not all of this traffic would be intermodal in nature. Trains would arrive from other parts of the UK and be remarshalled into specific destinations on the continent.	
Wentloog	Cardiff	February 2001	Terminal	Opened to replace the previous site at Pengam; site occupies over 25 acres (10 ha), twice the size of Pengam	

== Mothballed/unused terminals ==
The following are either not in use as intermodal terminals at present, but remain connected to the national network. Most will still be in use for rail business, but not handling containers.

Name	Location	Dates of operation	Notes	Refs
ARIFT	Isle of Anglesey	2018	Has been used to accept new passenger trains onto the network	
Bristol West	Bristol	2010–2019	Opened to transport wine in containers. The cessation of tolls for vehicles on the Severn Bridge(s), meant that the traffic was diverted to Wentloog at Cardiff and sent to Bristol via lorry.	
Burton-on-Trent	Burton-on-Trent	–2009		
Griffin Wharf	Ipswich	1970–2013	Container terminal used sporadically by EWS/DB Cargo, until economic pressures forced a relocation to loading at Felixstowe. Terminal is available for other traffics, such as sand and sea-dredged aggregates.	
Harwich	Essex		Much of the intermodal traffic at Harwich as hauled by Freightliner was lost when the Channel Tunnel opened. It has been used sporadically since then.	
Ripple Lane	East London	c. 1970–2007/2008	Used up to 2007 for various Freightliner flows, but was notable for being used in the Sugarliner service, conveying sugar to Daventry.	
Selby	North Yorkshire	2002–2018	The terminal at Selby was run by the Potter group, but traffic to Selby was later diverted to South Yorkshire; first to Rotherham, and occasionally to Sheffield Tinsley.	
Thamesport	Isle of Grain	1991–2016	Closed in 2016 due to downturn in container handling. Other terminals, specifically the Port of Southampton, and London Gateway, took most of Thamesport's business.	
Telford International Rail Freight Park (TIRFP)	Telford	ca. 2009	Terminal	Intended as an intermodal terminal, but the traffic failed to materialise. Some containers are occasionally delivered ad hoc via Ministry of Defence trains that use the site, but the bulk of this traffic is non-intermodal.

== Closed terminals ==
This section relates to former terminals which had dedicated services, and infrastructure such as gantry cranes, which have now closed. It does not include such terminals such as those at ports which operated a service previously. For example, in the early part of the 2000s, containers of car parts were transferred from Avonmouth to Tyne Dock for Nissan. Both these freight terminals still operate, but not necessarily in an intermodal capacity.

Name	Location	Dates	Notes	Refs
Aberdeen		1966–1987		
Aintree	Liverpool	1969–1986	The site was dedicated from the outset to international traffic delivered to and from Aintree via Southampton.	
Barton Dock	Manchester	1969–2013	The site was dedicated from the outset to international traffic delivered to and from Barton Dock via Southampton.	
Beeston	Nottingham	1969–1986		
Caernarfon	North Wales	1970–1972	Used as an alternative port after the Menai Bridge burnt down in 1970. The track was reinstated between Bangor and Caernarvon for the traffic to access the branch. (Note: The name Caernarfon is used, but until 1974, the anglicised version of Caernarvon was used by British Rail.)	
Dudley	West Midlands	1967–1986	Closed completely; traffic transferred to Lawley Street in Birmingham	
Dundee		1972–1987		
Follingsby	Newcastle	1967–1987		
Greenock		–1986		
Gushetfaulds	Glasgow	1965–1993		
Heysham		1967–		
Holyhead	Anglesey	–1991	Spent two years idle (1970 – 1972), when containers were sent to Caernarfon after the Menai Bridge Fire of 1970.	
Immingham		1999	Used sporadically for feeder services during British Rail days. EWS ran a service between Immingham and Ditton in 1999.	
Hull		1967–1987 (1997)	Closed in 1987. Freightliner ran some containers trains to Hull from Trafford Park in 1997, but the service was deemed uneconomic. The port of hull has intermodal transfer facilities, but this only exists between sea and road transport.	
King's Cross (York Way)	London	1968–1986	Also known as Maiden Lane	
Longsight	Manchester	1966–1987		
Par	Cornwall	1968–1970	Service from Park Royal (London), only lasted two years.	
Pengam	Cardiff	1967 – 2001	Closed in February 2001, replaced by Wentloog terminal further east	
Plymouth		1968–1970	Service from Park Royal (London), only lasted two years.	
Portobello	Edinburgh	1965–1987		
Sheffield		1967–		
Stockton		1967–1989	Closed in 1989; replaced by Wilton on South Teesside	
Stratford	London	1968–1994		
Danygraig	Swansea	1969–1987		
TIRFT	Tilbury	1997–2020	Tilbury International Railfreight Terminal, built on the former Tilbury Riverside station, was replaced by a new site, Tilbury2 Port, built on the old Tilbury Power Station site	
Wilton	Teesside	1989–2014	Closed in 2014; replaced by a new site within Teesport	

== Future and proposed sites ==
Name	Location	Date	Notes	Ref
Avonmouth Container Terminal	Avonmouth Docks	Unknown (Note: Official press release from The Bristol Port Company states "We are currently waiting for global economic conditions to improve. Once construction starts the terminal will be ready in 3 years.")	A new deep sea terminal to cater for an increase in container traffic. The share of containers travelling by rail is estimated to be 40%.	
East Midlands Intermodal Park	Toyota Manufacturing UK plant, Burnaston		A NSIP (nationally significant infrastructure project) first proposed in 2014, in 2021 it was announced that the site would be included in proposals to create an East Midlands Freeport.	
Four Ashes	Four Ashes, Staffordshire		Site will be adjacent to the West Coast Main Line and Junction 12 of the M6 Motorway. Site was approved by the Secretary of State for transport in May 2020. The proposed capability is for ten trains per day.	
Mossend International Railfreight Park (MIRP)	Mossend	2021	Site is under construction with an expected opening date of 2021. It will be operated by P D Stirling	
Northampton Gateway	Roade (near Northampton)	2023	Site under construction since January 2021. The site is on land between the Northampton Loop Line and the M1 Motorway, and is only 18 miles (29 km) from Daventry SRFI.	
Radlett Airfield	Radlett	2013	Approval granted in 2013, but St Albans Council zoned the area as housing, which has slowed the process. The campaigns for and against the SRFI have been protracted.	
Rail Central	Blisworth		Proposed site between the West Coast Main Line and the Northampton Loop line	

There are proposals to also open SRFIs (Strategic Rail Freight Interchanges) at Skypark in Devon, Parkside in Lancashire, Etwall in Derbyshire, Burbage, Peterborough and SIFE (Slough International Freight Exchange) with a connection on the Colnbrook branch.

== Operators ==
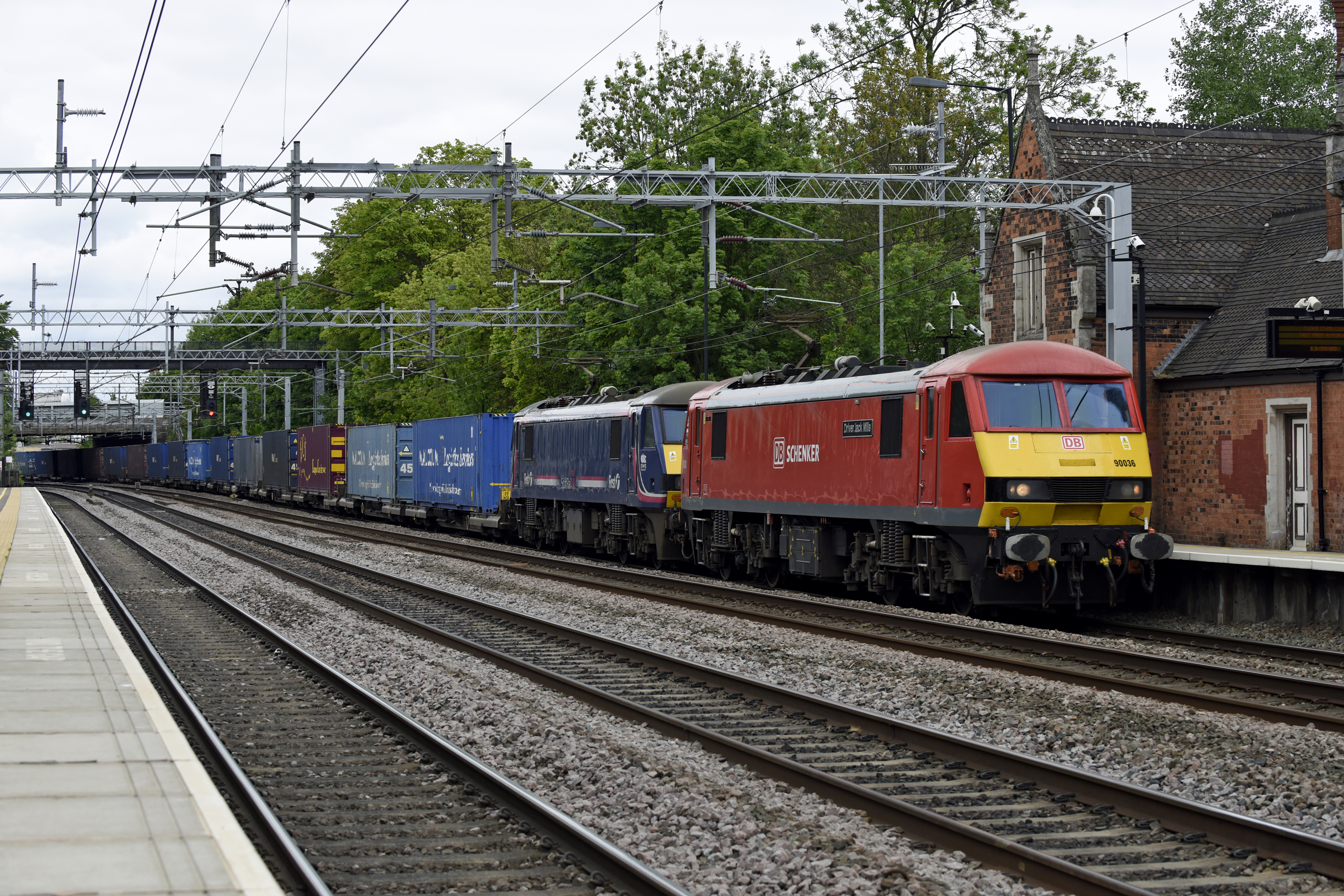
Class 90s, no 90024 and 90036 pass Atherstone railway station with an intermodal train from Mossend to Daventry

Intermodal trains were operated by British Rail from its inception until Privatisation in 1996. Immediately after Privatisation, the main company providing intermodal services was Freightliner, though EWS carried containers on their Enterprise wagonload service, and had started an initial service between Harwich and Doncaster to rival services run by Freightliner from Felixstowe. Later, other operators took on their own services, oftentimes running to their own unique locations, though with the gradual increase in Strategic Railfreight Interchanges (SFRI), many operators would rail containers to the same destinations from the same point of origin.

DIRFT, which opened in 1997, had ten departures daily operated by Freightliner, DB Cargo (previously EWS), and Direct Rail Services. Five of those trains went to Scotland going to their own loading points for each company; typically Coatbridge for Freightliner, Mossend for DB Cargo and either Mossend, Elderslie or Grangemouth for DRS.

- Advenza Freight; 2004–2009 (Note: Whilst the company was in operation between those dates, its intermodal services lasted, weeks or months only.)
- British Rail 1967–1997
- Direct Rail Services 2001–present
- DB Cargo 1996–present
- Fastline Freight 2006–2010
- Freightliner 1995–present
- GB Railfreight 2002–present

== See also ==
- Rail freight in Great Britain
