= Rail freight in Great Britain =

History and types of freight moved by rail in Great Britain

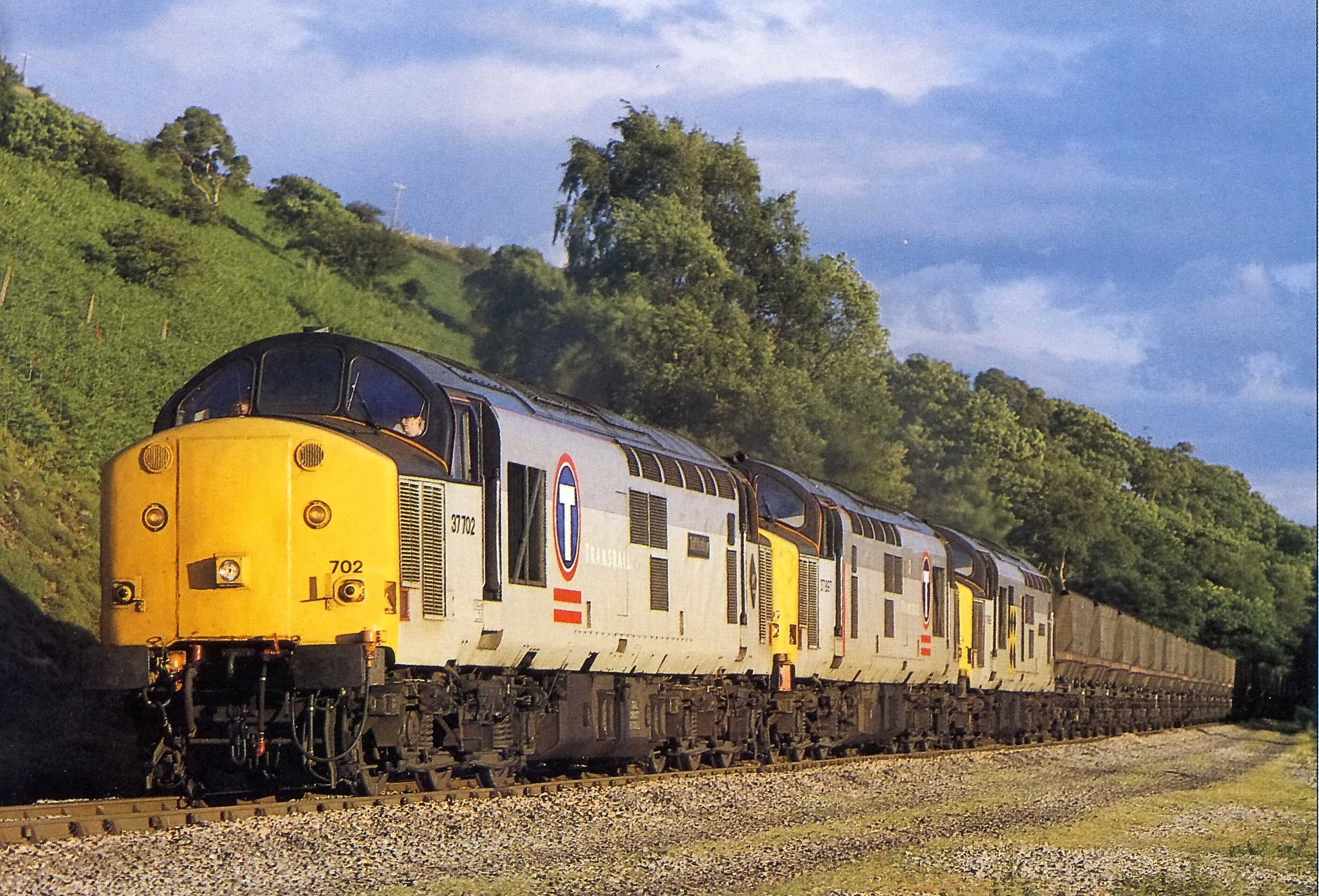
Three Class 37 locomotives hauling a coal train on the Rhymney Line in 1997

Mass of freight carried by rail in the UK from 1983 to 2021 (annual rolling average). There was a large decrease in coal carried in 1984–5 due to the miners' strike.

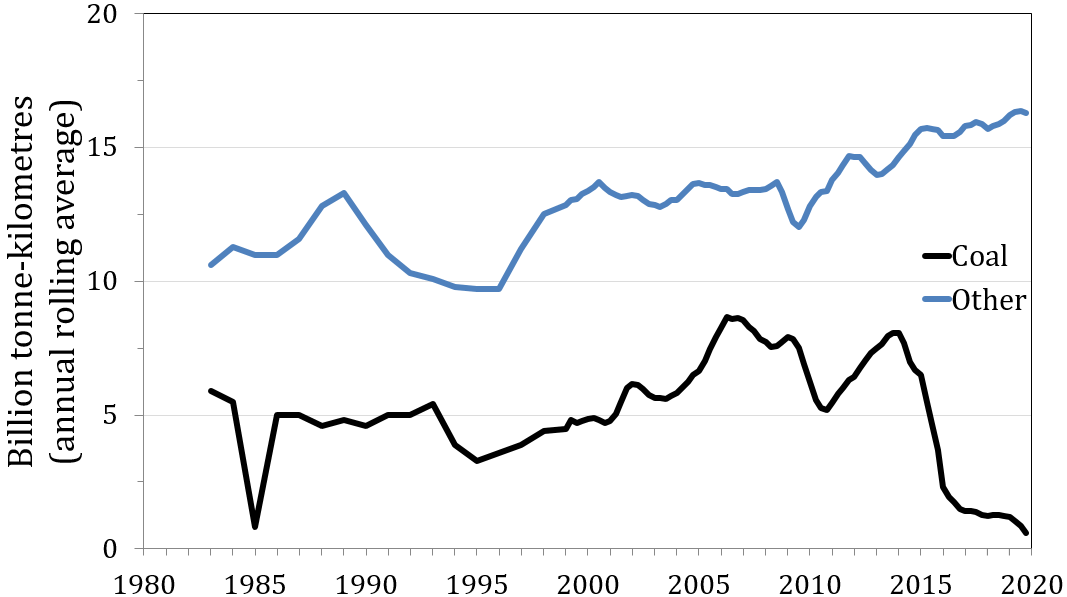
Rail freight moved in the UK from 1983 to 2019, in terms of mass-distance per year

The railway network in Great Britain has been used to transport goods of various types and in varying volumes since the early 19th century. Network Rail, which owns and maintains the network, aims to increase the amount of goods carried by rail. In 2015–16 Britain's railways moved 17.8 billion net tonne kilometres, a 20% fall compared to 2014–15. Coal accounted for 13.1% of goods transport in Britain, down considerably from previous years. There are no goods transported by railway in Northern Ireland.

== History ==
=== Pre-19th century ===
Even in the 16th century, mining engineers used crude wooden rails to facilitate the movement of mine wagons steered by hand. In Nottingham, 1603, a tramway was constructed to transport coal from mines near Strelley to Wollaton. Horse-drawn lines were increasingly common by the 18th and early 19th centuries, chiefly to haul bulk materials from mines to canal wharves or areas of consumption.

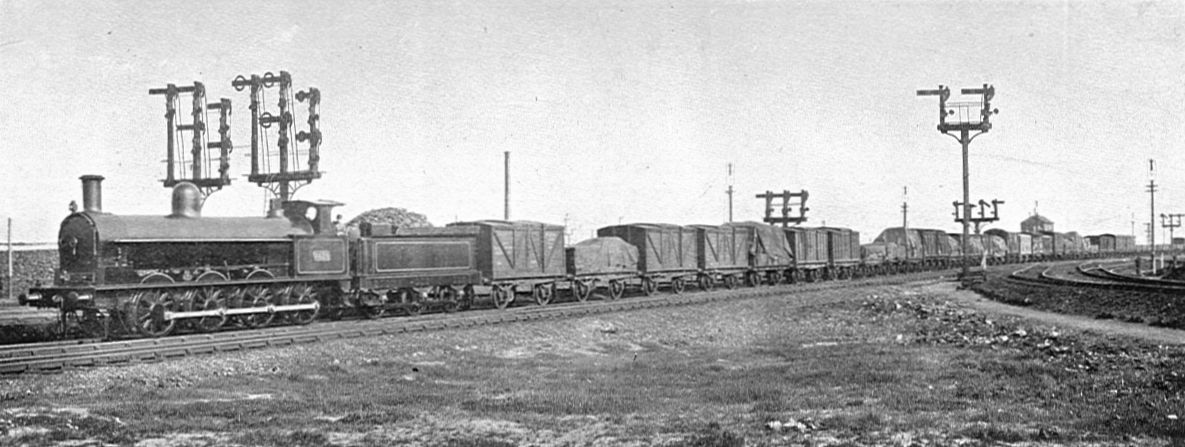
A goods train hauled by an LNWR Class C locomotive, passing through Crewe in 1907

=== 19th century ===
The world's first steam locomotive engine was demonstrated by Richard Trevithick in 1804. Steam powered rail freight operated regularly on the Middleton Railway, near Leeds, long before any passenger services. Many of the early railways of Britain carried goods, including the Stockton and Darlington Railway and the Liverpool and Manchester Railway. The LMR was originally intended to carry goods between the Port of Liverpool and east Lancashire, although it subsequently developed as mixed passenger-goods railway.

The network expanded rapidly as small private firms rushed to build new lines. Over the course of the 19th and early 20th centuries, these amalgamated or were bought by competitors until only a handful of larger companies remained (see Railway mania).

The Post Office began using letter-sorting carriages in 1838, and the railway quickly proved to be a much quicker and more efficient means of transport than the old mail coaches. It was estimated in 1832 that using the LMR to transport mail between the two cities reduced the expense to the government by two-thirds. It was also much faster to send newspapers across Great Britain.

=== Early 20th century ===
The First World War was dubbed the "Railway War" at the time. Indeed, thousands of tonnes of munitions and supplies were distributed from all over Great Britain to ports in the South East of England for shipping to France and the Front Line. Due to pre-war inefficiencies in the rail goods transport, a number of economisation programmes were needed to allow the railways to meet with the huge demand that was being put on their services. The Common User Agreement for wagon usage and regulation of coal services through the Coal Transport Act 1917 are examples of such programmes, which enabled better utilisation of railway assets across the industry. The success of such schemes was entirely down to the collaboration of more than 100 railway companies, who abandoned the fierce competition of the pre-war years to work together in the national interest. In no sector was this more obvious than in rail goods transport.

During the Second World War, vast quantities of materials were moved around Britain by rail. During the early stages of the war, goods trains ran to rural stations in Norfolk to enable airfields to be constructed. In 1944, 500 special trains ran every day on the network and over a million wagons were controlled by the government's Inter-Company Freight Rolling Stock Control organisation.

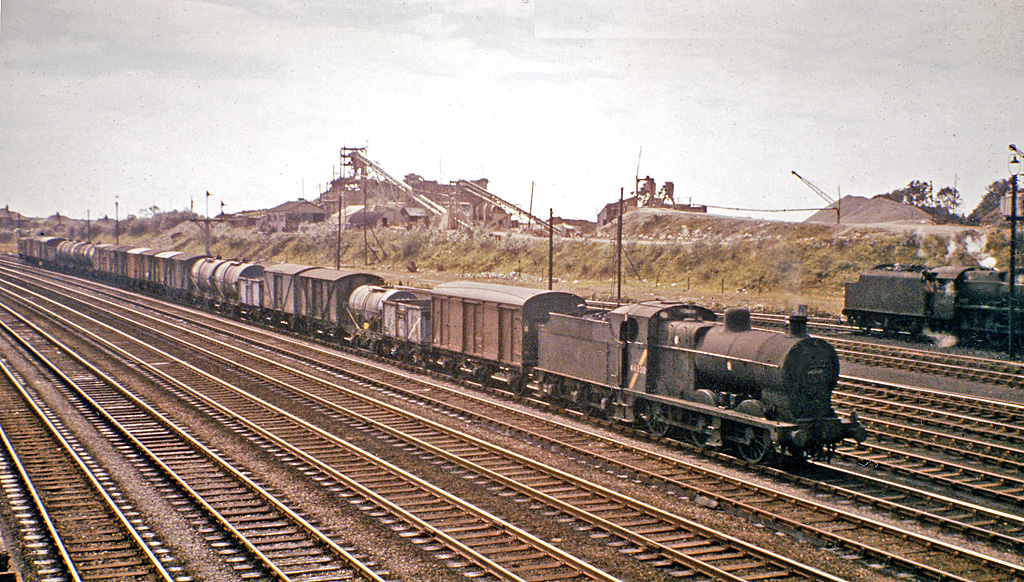
A pre-World War II LMS Fowler Class 4F steam locomotive hauling a mixed freight train at Carnforth in 1964

Beer was a major rail-hauled commodity, but gradually switched to the improving road network. The complex network of brewery railways in Burton upon Trent became disused by 1970. Likewise, milk was widely transported by rail until the late 1960s. The last milk tank wagons ran in 1981.

=== Nationalisation era ===
Britain's railways were nationalised in 1947 including goods operations. Under the 1955 British Rail Modernisation Plan, massive investment was made in marshalling yards at a time when the use of small wagon load traffic with which they dealt was in steep decline. Railway freight services had been in steady decline since the 1930s, initially because of the loss of the manufacturing industry and then road haulage's cost advantage in combination with higher wages.

By 1959 it was realised that the Modernisation Plans were not working. The wagon load traffic lost £57 million on receipts of £105 million in 1961. Signal boxes would have to be staffed 24 hours a day in order to accept a limited amount of traffic. Even the most rural stations transported goods in the form of postal services; 3,368 stations generated only 4% of Royal Mail's receipts.

The Beeching cuts included a reduction in freight services, especially the marshalling yards, to concentrate on long distance bulk transport. In contrast to passenger services, they greatly modernised the goods sector, replacing inefficient wagons with containerised regional hubs. The industry today is very similar to Dr Beeching's vision half a century ago.

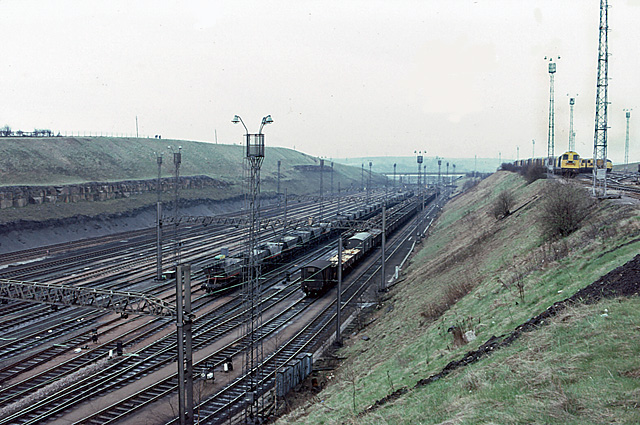
Tinsley Marshalling Yard (pictured here in 1982) was one of several large yards which never handled the large volumes of freight required to make them economical. The yard is now closed but a new cargo terminal opened nearby in 2011.

In the 1980s, British Rail was reorganised into "sectors" including four goods sectors:

- Trainload Freight took trainload goods
- Railfreight Distribution took non-trainload goods
- Freightliner took intermodal traffic
- Rail Express Systems took parcel traffic

The 1980s, however, also brought a huge down-turn in freight traffic, with the sector increasingly seen as irrelevant and without a future.

In 1986, quarrying company Foster Yeoman prompted a turnaround in the reliability of rail freight by obtaining permission to run its own locomotives, and importing the first four EMD class 59s. This design was developed into the class 66 which became widely used by EWS and other operators over a decade later.

=== Privatisation era ===
When British Rail was privatised in the 1990s, six freight operating companies (FOCs) were set up:

- Trainload goods was split into three geographical units (all were purchased by Wisconsin Central and merged to form English, Welsh & Scottish (EWS) in 1996):
  - Mainline Freight in the south-east
  - Loadhaul in the north-east
  - Transrail in the west
- Railfreight Distribution was also sold to EWS in 1997
- Rail Express Systems was also sold to EWS in 1996
- Freightliner was privatised with the brand name retained

The opening of the Channel Tunnel in 1994 allowed direct goods trains to run between the UK and the continent for the first time. Freight services are also offered by the Getlink truck shuttles.

Subsequently, EWS's nuclear flask train operations were sold to the new company Direct Rail Services set up by British Nuclear Fuels.

GB Railfreight was a new freight company established in 1998 by GB Railways. It was later owned by FirstGroup, Europorte and EQT AB.

Deutsche Bahn purchased EWS for £309 million on 13 November 2007. On 1 January 2009, EWS was rebranded as DB Schenker along with Deutsche Bahn's Railion and DB Schenker divisions. In March 2016, DB Schenker was rebranded as DB Cargo throughout Europe.

Since 1995, the amount of freight carried on the railways has increased sharply due to increased reliability and competition, as well as new international services. Major road haulage operations such as the Stobart Group and WH Malcolm move goods by rail, hauling supplies for Asda and Tesco. Morrisons also uses rail freight, as do Marks & Spencer and many more retailers.

A symbolic loss to the rail freight industry in Great Britain was the custom of the Royal Mail, which from 2004 discontinued use of its 49-train fleet, switching to road haulage after a near 170-year preference for trains. Mail trains had long been part of the tradition of the railways in Great Britain, famously celebrated in the film Night Mail, for which W. H. Auden wrote the poem of the same name. Although Royal Mail suspended the mail train in January 2004, this decision was reversed in December of the same year, and Class 325s are now used on some routes including between London, Warrington and Scotland.

The Department for Transport's Transport Ten Year Plan called for an 80% increase in rail freight measured from a 2000–1 base. By the year 2015 rail-borne intermodal traffic is scheduled to double, and by 2030 the whole of rail freight is expected to double at 50.4 billion tonne km.

== Current operations ==
Goods carried by rail are either intermodal (container) freight or trainload freight which includes coal, metals, oil, and construction materials.

There are four main freight rail operating companies in the UK: Direct Rail Services, Freightliner, DB Cargo UK (formerly EWS), and GB Railfreight. There are also three smaller independent operators, which are Colas Rail, DCRail and Mendip Rail. The Rail Delivery Group set up by the DfT includes representatives of rail freight companies.

Statistics on freight are specified in terms of the weight of freight lifted, and the net tonne kilometre, being freight weight multiplied by distance carried. 116.6 million tonnes of freight was lifted in the 2013–4 period, against 138 million tonnes in 1986–7, a decrease of 16%. However, a record 22.7 billion net tonne kilometres (14 billion net ton miles) of freight movement were recorded in 2013–14, against 16.6 billion (10.1 billion) in 1986–7, an increase of 38%. Coal used to make up around 36% of the total net tonne kilometre, though its share is declining. Rail freight has slightly increased its market share since privatisation (by net tonne kilometres) from 7.0% in 1998 to 9.1% in 2011 and around 12% in 2016. Recent growth is partly due to more international services including the Channel Tunnel and Port of Felixstowe, which is containerised. Nevertheless, network bottlenecks and insufficient investment in catering for 9' 6" high shipping containers currently restrict growth.

== Intermodal freight ==
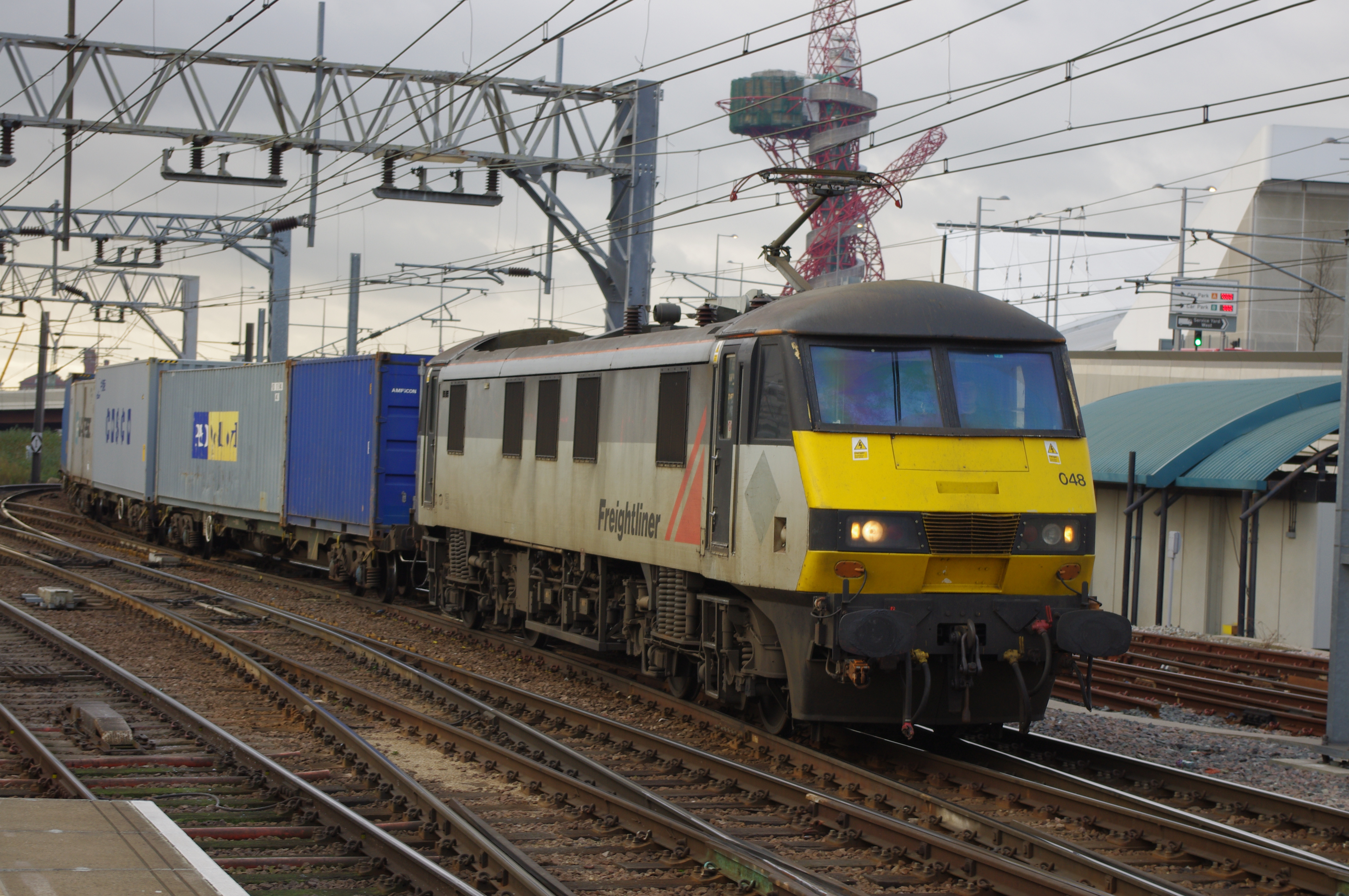
An example of intermodal freight: a Freightliner Class 90 at Stratford, hauling an intermodal train from Crewe to Felixstowe

Liner train and freightliner are UK terms for trains carrying intermodal containers. The latter name was coined by Richard Beeching in the 1960s, and later became the name of the Freightliner sector of British Rail. This was sold off as a private enterprise, Freightliner, in 1995, as part of the privatisation of BR. Freightliner or liner may mean either intermodal services run solely by Freightliner or intermodal services in general. Additionally, bin liner, or binliner, is a slang term for a liner train carrying containers of waste for disposal.

=== Terminals ===
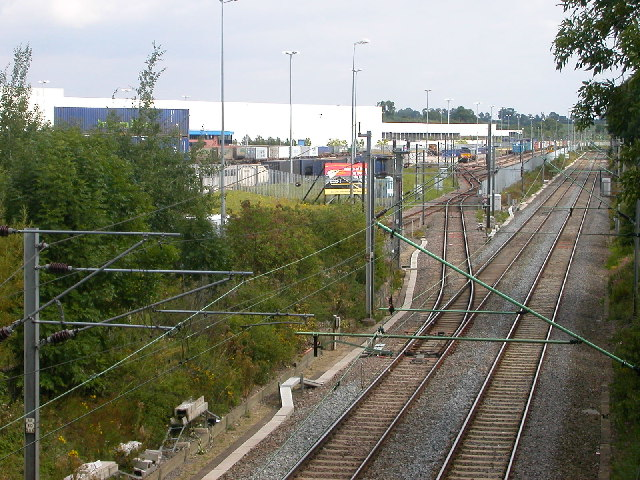
The rail access to the Daventry International Rail Freight Terminal (DIRFT), a major intermodal terminal

Major intermodal freight terminals include:

==== Sea ports ====
- Port of Bristol
- Felixstowe
- Port of Grangemouth
- Port of Hull
- Immingham
- Seaforth Dock, Liverpool
- Southampton
- Thamesport
- Tilbury
- Teesport

==== Inland terminals ====
- Birch Coppice near Tamworth, West Midlands
- Barking Rail Freight Terminal
- Burton upon Trent Rail Freight Terminal
- Birmingham (Lawley Street) Terminal
- Coatbridge (Glasgow) Terminal
- Daventry International Rail Freight Terminal, West Midlands
- Doncaster Inland Port
- Doncaster International Railport
- Dollands Moor, Kent - for freight via the Channel Tunnel
- East Midlands Gateway Rail Freight Terminal, Kegworth, Leicestershire. Near East Midlands Airport.
- Hams Hall Rail Freight Terminal
- Stourton (Leeds) Terminal
- Liverpool Freightliner Terminal, Garston, Liverpool
- Manchester Trafford Park Terminal
- Sheffield International Rail Freight Terminal
- Telford International Railfreight Park
- Trafford Park Euroterminal
- Wakefield Europort
- Wembley European Freight Operations Centre
- Wentloog (Cardiff) Terminal

== Trainload freight ==
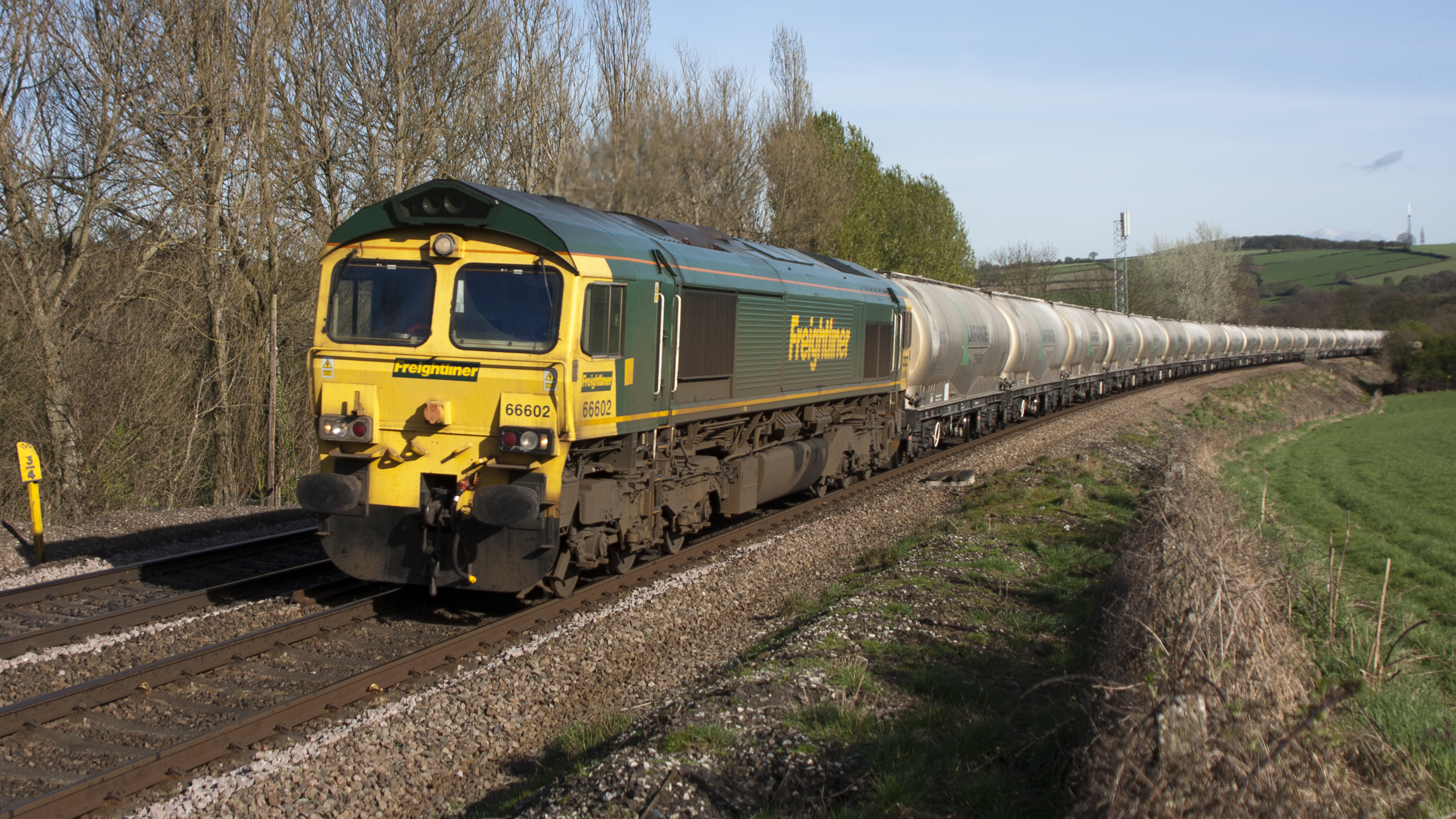
An example of trainload goods: a Freightliner Class 66 hauling empty cement tanks

Trainload freight movements include:

=== Oil and petroleum ===
- GB Railfreight runs up to two 20 tank trains a week for Petrochem Carless Ltd, transporting gas condensate from North Walsham to a refinery in Harwich. The company also transports up to 3 trains per week of petroleum products from the North East to Inver Terminal at the Queen Alexandra Dock in Cardiff
- Colas Rail Freight will provide haulage for bitumen from the Lindsey Oil Refinery to Total UK's Preston production plant.
- DB Cargo UK moves petrochemicals from Grangemouth, Fawley, the Humber, Lindsey and Milford Haven refineries.

=== Construction materials ===
- Lafarge uses rail freight in its various cement works.
- GB Railfreight hauls raw materials and finished goods including gypsum, aggregates, limestone, iron ore, sleepers, ballast and rails. Its customers for this include Lafarge Tarmac, British Gypsum, Yeoman, Aggregate Industries, Network Rail and TfL.
- Mendip Rail operates aggregates trains for its parent companies Aggregate Industries (due to acquisition of Foster Yeoman) and Hanson (due to acquisition of ARC). It holds the record for the longest and heaviest British train.

=== Food and drink ===
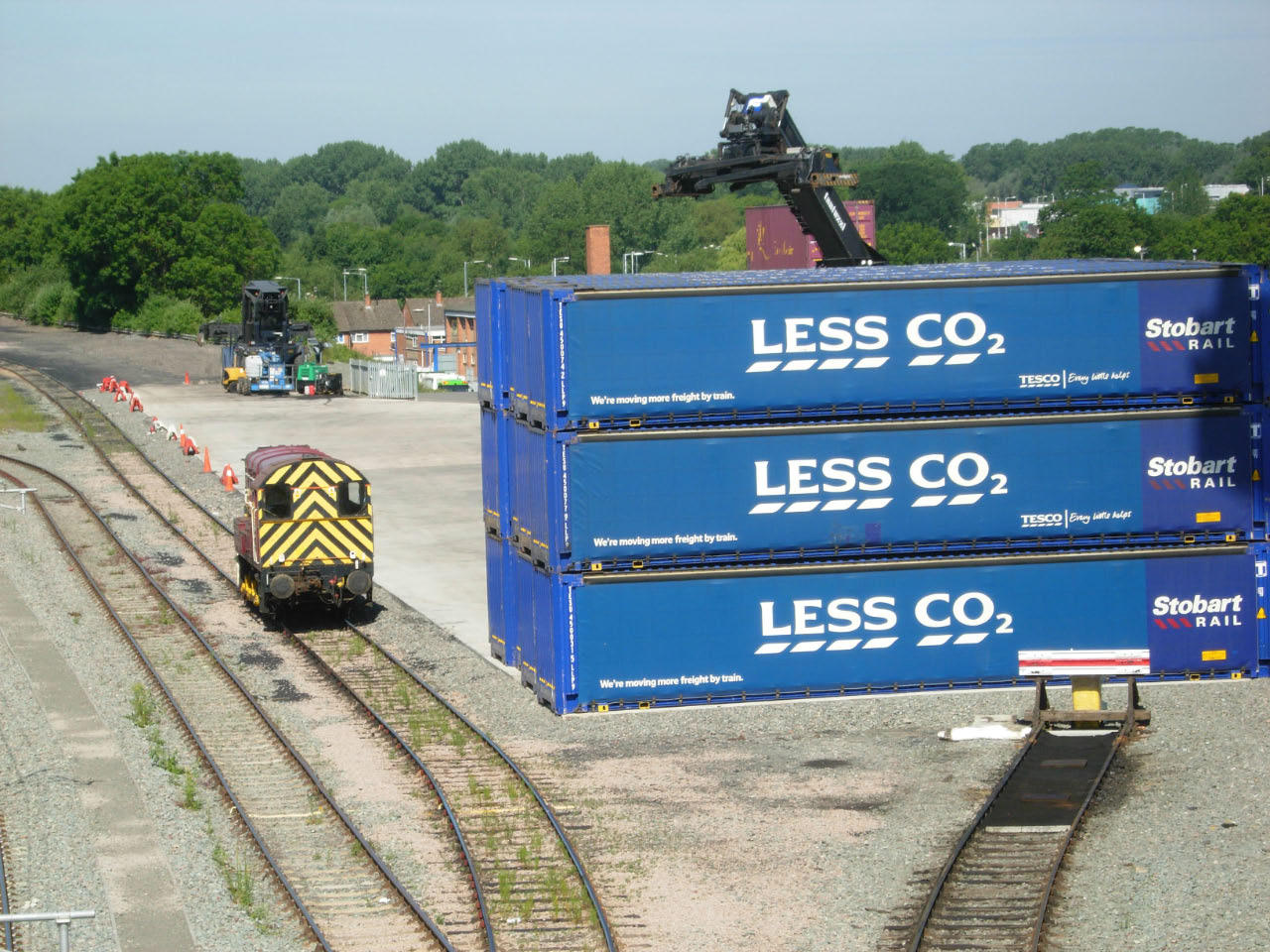
Tesco "Less CO_{2}" intermodal containers at Rugby Yard

- Asda grocery goods have been moved between distribution centres in Daventry, Grangemouth and Aberdeen using Malcolm Group and Direct Rail Services since 2001.
- Tesco products are moved by Stobart Rail (Direct Rail Services) from Daventry to Mossend and Inverness. The company was responsible for the longest train journey in Europe by a single operator when fresh Spanish produce was transported in a refrigerated train from Valencia to Dagenham—a 1,100 mile journey.
- Colas Rail imports melons as part of the regular Norfolk Lines train from Italy to the Midlands.
- Soft drinks manufacturer Britvic uses Malcolm Logistics for its rail freight from Daventry to Grangemouth and Mossend.

=== Nuclear flask trains ===
- Direct rail Services operates all nuclear flask trains in Britain which, until the late 1990s, were previously operated by EWS (and British Rail before it). Destinations served include the UK nuclear power stations at Heysham, Valley (for Wylfa), Bridgwater (for Hinkley Point), Berkeley (for Oldbury), Hunterston, Torness, Seaton Carew, Dungeness and Sizewell.
- The company formerly operated trains to the railhead at Southminster for fuel from Bradwell nuclear power station, however this installation is now in the process of being decommissioned.
- There are also occasional trains from Ramsden Dock at Barrow-in-Furness to the processing plant at Sellafield, carrying nuclear waste from nuclear power stations in Japan and the Netherlands for treatment. DRS also have a contract to supply the Royal Navy's Devonport Dockyard with fuel for Britain's nuclear submarine fleet. These trains only run as required. There is also a train from Hull to Sellafield which reprocesses Russian spent fuel.
- Low-level nuclear waste is carried by rail in containers from Sellafield to the Low Level Waste Repository at Drigg, several miles down the Cumbrian Coast.
- There are plans to start running trains between Sellafield and Georgemas Junction in 2012, returning spent fuel from Dounreay to Sellafield.

=== Steel ===
- Tata move steel products from Margam to Llanwern by rail, and from Scunthorpe to Ebange (France) via the Channel Tunnel. 10 trains run to/from the major Tata plant at Scunthorpe.

=== Timber ===
- Colas Rail operates timber trains to Chirk from Carlisle, Ribblehead in the Pennines, Baglan Bay in South Wales and Teigngrace in Devon.

=== Vehicles ===
Road vehicles, particularly passenger cars, can be moved by rail using autoracks. Ford and Honda are two companies who use rail to transport road vehicles. Ford launched its Dagenham Dock to Halewood train using Cartic 4 wagons (up to 34 cars on each double deck wagon) on 13 July 1966. It was expected 200,000 Ford vehicles would be carried each year at a rate of 50 to 60 trains a week, plus 10 a week to the docks. 538 sets of Cartic 4 wagons were built between 1966 and 1972 and not finally scrapped until 2013. Jaguar Land Rover and BMW also use rail to transport vehicles. 90% of all finished vehicle rail movements within the UK are run by DB Cargo UK.

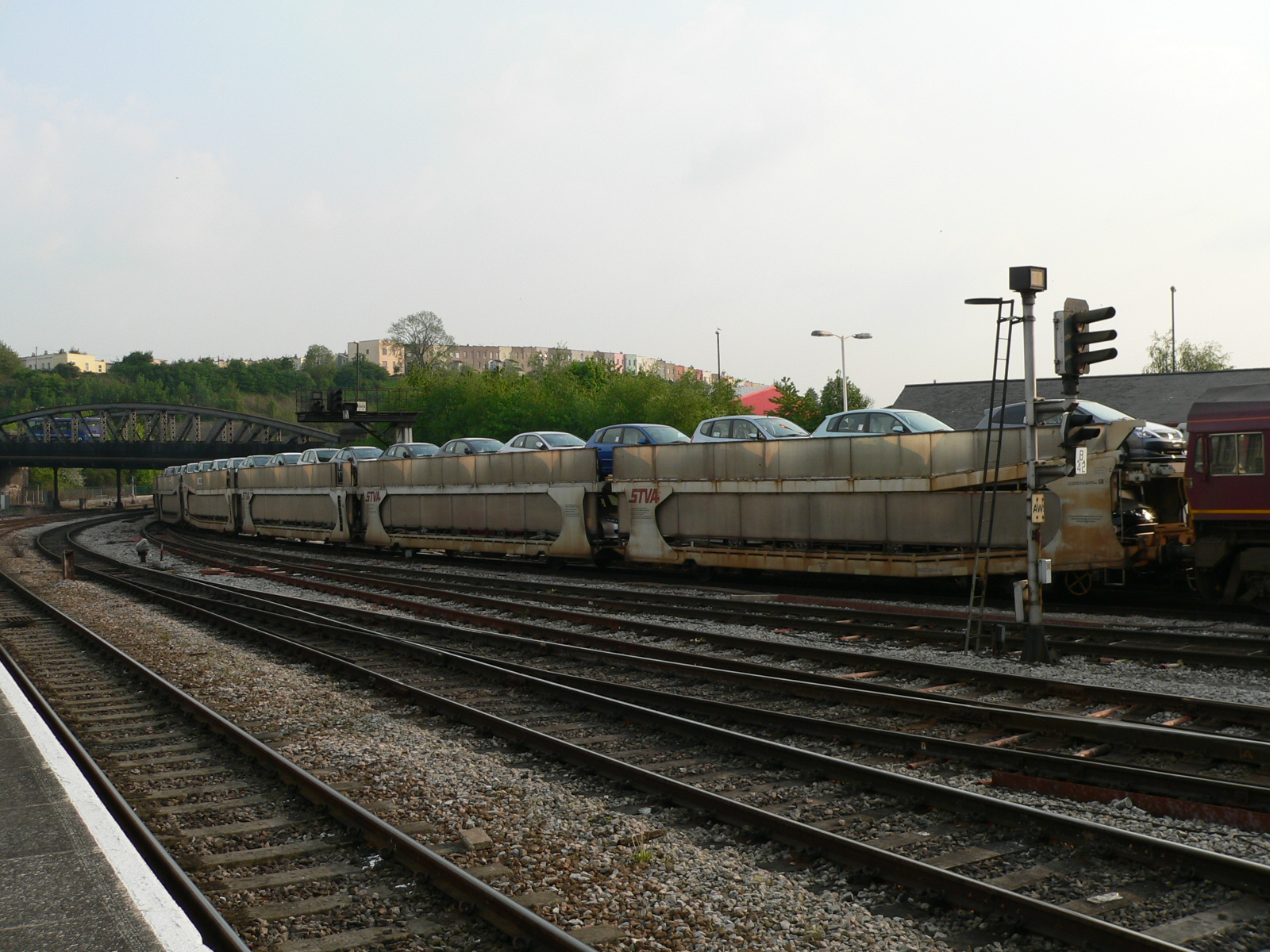
Wagons transporting Honda cars at Bristol Temple Meads, 2006

=== Waste ===
"Binliner" routes include:

- Northolt and Cricklewood to Calvert landfill site
- Routes from Greater Manchester to Roxby Gullet landfill site (Freightliner)
- Brentford to Appleford in Oxfordshire by DB Cargo UK
- Dagenham and Hillingdon to Calvert landfill for West Waste, also a DB Cargo UK service
- North London Waste Authority uses Freightliner Heavy Haul to operate a daily service from the transfer station at Hendon to Stewartby
- Bristol and Bath Councils have used rail since the 1980s and Freightliner now operate the service completing a daily circuit between the two transfer stations in Bristol and Bath to the landfill site at Calvert in Buckinghamshire
- Freightliner Heavy Haul carries Manchester's household waste on daily services from four transfer stations at Northenden, Bredbury, Pendleton and Dean Lane to Runcorn EfW Facility
- Edinburgh has used rail since 1989, and the DB Cargo UK service is booked to run Mondays to Saturday from Powderhall waste transfer station to a landfill site at Dunbar, a distance of 27 miles

=== Coal ===
Coal transport declined rapidly in the 2020s as Great Britain phased out coal use in power generation. The last coal supply train ran into the last coal power station in Britain, Ratcliffe-on-Soar, on 29 September 2024, shortly before the power station closed. Trains circa 2013 included:

- DB Cargo UK ran coal trains between mining sites in South Wales, Nottinghamshire, South Yorkshire and Scotland and coal-fired power stations around Britain. These were merry-go-round trains.
- 40 coal trains per day ran from Immingham to coal-fired power stations in the Aire Valley (Drax, Eggborough) and the Trent Valley (Cottam, Ratcliffe-on-Soar, West Burton). Around 2011, the Humber ports generated 18% of total UK freight by tonnage via the South Humberside Main Line.
