= Basford Hall Yard =

Railway yard in Crewe, Cheshire, England

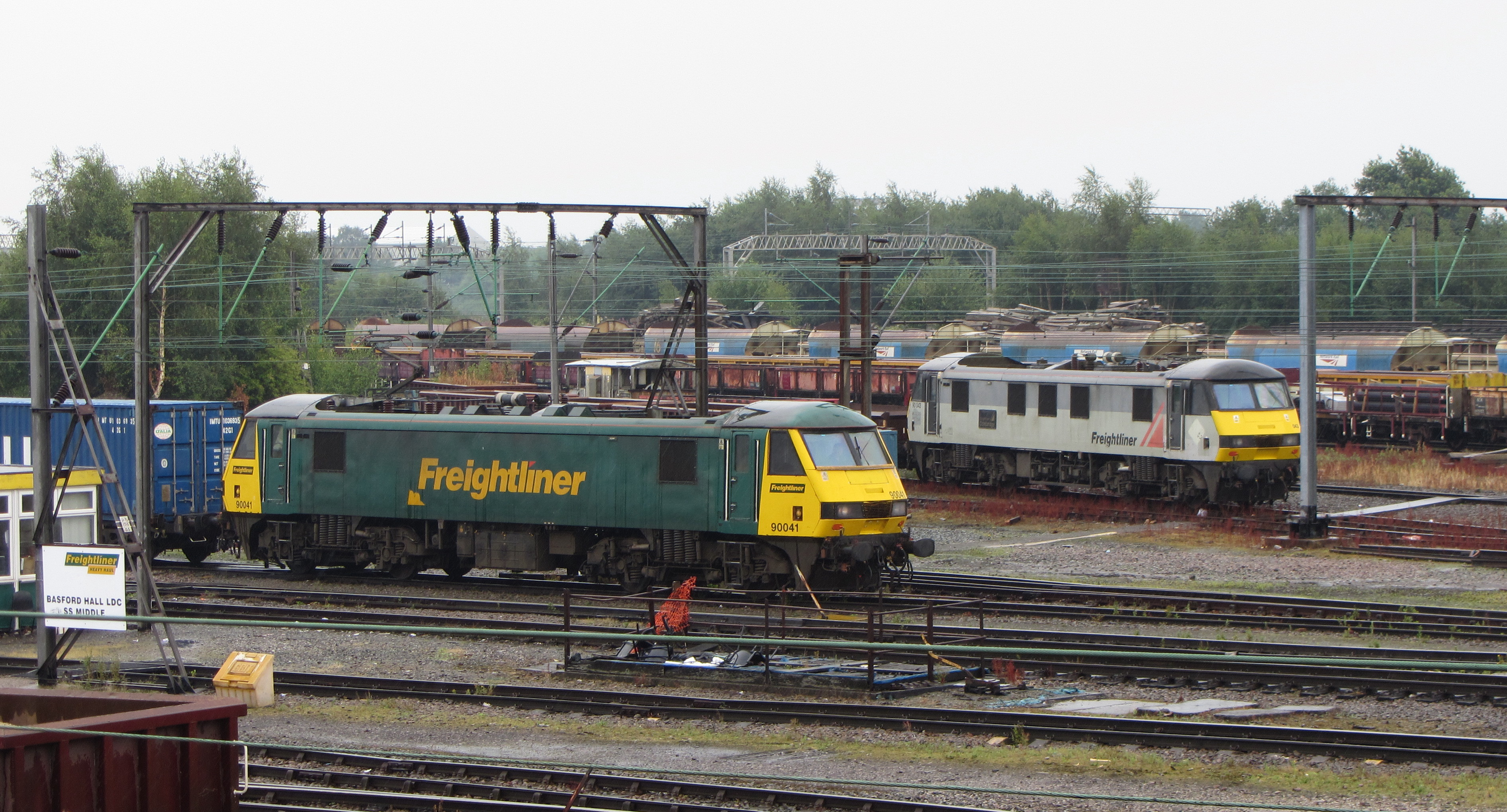
- Locomotives at Basford Hall Yard, Crewe
- Interactive map of Basford Hall Yard

Location
- Location: Crewe, Cheshire, England
- Coordinates: 53.075°N 2.428°W
- OS grid: SJ714532

Characteristics
- Owner: Network Rail
- Operator: Freightliner Group
- Type: Freight yard
- Routes served: West Coast Main Line

History
- Opened: 1901
- Original: London and North Western Railway
- Post-grouping: London Midland Scottish Railway
- BR region: Midland Region

Basford Hall Yard is a railway marshalling yard near the town of Crewe, Cheshire, England. The yard, which is 0.93 miles (1.5 km) south of Crewe railway station, was opened in 1901 by the London and North Western Railway (LNWR). Initially used to marshal trains, the site now acts as a hub mainly for Freightliner intermodal trains, but also houses departmental sidings (track engineering works) as used by Freightliner Heavy Haul, and other operators. For a period in the 1930s, Basford Hall was the busiest marshalling yard in Europe, handling between 28,000 and 47,000 wagons every week.

The yard is a nationally important node on the West Coast Main Line (WCML), with most freight trains routed through the yard in order to avoid congesting the nearby Crewe railway station, which is also an important junction on the WCML for passengers. The yard is now one of the busiest in Great Britain for freight traffic.

== History ==
The railway through Crewe was opened by the Grand Junction Railway (GJR) in 1837, however, the marshalling yard at Basford Hall was not built until 1901, when the LNWR, successors to the GJR, built avoiding lines due to the amount of freight trains passing through Crewe railway station. The opening of Basford Hall, allowed smaller yards at Gresty Green, Gresty Lane and North Staffordshire Junction to be closed and the traffic handled there transferred to the new yard. Between the 1920s and 1940s, the average number of wagons shunted at the yard, amounted to 28,000 per week. In 1937, it was recorded that over 47,000 wagons had been dealt with in the yard in one week; this made Crewe Basford Hall the busiest marshalling yard in Europe at that point, and had over 30 miles (48 km) of trackwork in sidings and access lines.

The yard was adapted as part of the 1955 Modernisation Plan, and electrified in 1961 when the West Coast Main Line was electrified through Crewe to Liverpool and Manchester between 1960 and 1966. The re-modelling of the yard, which was undertaken between June 1959 and November 1961, amounted to £280,000, and included the installation of a hump and 33 miles (53 km) electrified sidings. Previously, the yard was flat-shunted, but the addition of the hump allowed wagonload traffic to be sorted efficiently in the sidings. The electrification of the yard was complete by June 1962, and a new link to the Crewe–Derby line and to the south connecting to the Madeley line, allowed for a greater throughput of traffic and the closure of the yards at Chatterley and Alsager.

The yard is located some 0.93 miles (1.5 km) south of Crewe railway station and was originally constructed to serve wagonload traffic, which it did until 1972, when all wagonload /Speedlink traffic was concentrated on Warrington Arpley Yard. After Speedlink was closed down, some wagonload traffic continued, and Crewe was used as a marshalling point for terminals in the north west from 1991. A dedicated service ran from Crewe to Dover to connect with the train ferry, and also from Crewe to Mossend Yard. This was the first time that Basford Hall had been used for marshalling since 1972.

The yard is connected to the West Coast Main Line to the south (Basford Hall Junction), but has access from the north end to the Shrewsbury Line, and via the Independent Lines (Note: The Independent Lines in Crewe bypass the station and allow freight trains to avoid the station and add to any congestion. The lines were built in the 1890s, with a major remodelling in 1985.) to the Chester line, the Manchester and Middlewich lines and the West Coast Main Line to the north. There used to be a dive-under connection to the line to Stoke-on-Trent, but this closed in 1984. The yard remains an important staging point on the West Coast Main Line, with much of the freight services passing through in order to avoid using the congested approaches to Crewe railway station.

=== Freightliner ===
Since the 1970s, the main use of Basford Hall has been the stabling and swapping of intermodal trains operated by the Freightliner Group. The use of Basford Hall as a node in the Freightliner network has been in use since the 1970s. Before the privatisation of British Rail, Freightliner trains would run from various locations in the north west, and also to and from Leeds and Holyhead, which were then swapped to make whole trains for other locations. In 1992, the destination roster was changed so that all services stopped at Crewe to allow swapping of containers. This meant that any destination or point of origin was possible with only one change. Whilst this process has lessened in the 21st century, Basford Hall is still an important location for the stabling and rearranging of trains for Freightliner's intermodal network. Basford Hall has a large throughput of traffic, partly due to its location on the avoiding lines from Crewe station, and as such, is now one of the busiest rail freight yards in Great Britain.

Freightliner also stable non-intermodal freight trains at Basford Hall, and they have a maintenance location on site for wagons and locomotives, but heavier repairs and maintenance is still undertaken at Leeds Midland Road. A fuelling point was opened at Basford Hall in 1998, when the yard experienced an upsurge in traffic, and in 2000, further remodelling of the down yard (on the west side of the complex) was undertaken. The Basford Hall facility is the home depot of the Class 86 and Class 90 fleet, and has five roads under cover. The traction maintenance depot (TMD) was opened on site in 2016, with the TOPS code of BA.

=== Local distribution centre ===
Freightliner also operate the local distribution centre (LDC) at Crewe. LDCs were introduced in the late 1990s as part of a new plan on the privatised railway. Previously, engineering trains of ballast, track and sleepers were taken direct from their locations to wherever the work was needed, but the privatised railway introduced a streamlining of the "departmental" system of trains and established virtual quarries (VQ) in strategic locations. Crewe Basford Hall LDC was opened in July 2000, replacing a VQ at Guide Bridge, (on the east side of Manchester), initially receiving ballast for its stockpile from Penmaenmawr Quarry on the North Wales coast, it has since had ballast delivered from Mountsorrel and Stud Farm in Leicestershire. Railtrack, Network Rail's predecessor, invested £3 million in remodelling part of Basford Hall for the new contract, which would include new sidings for the High Output Ballast Cleaner (HOBC).

The LDC has disposed of rails and metal sleepers via the EAF smelter at Aldwarke, and used ballast as recycled aggregates to a disposal point in Longport.

== HS2 ==
As part of the HS2 plan to link into Crewe railway station, a new infrastructure maintenance depot would be built to the west of the current Basford Hall yard. This would cover 37 hectares (91 acres) and be linked southwards onto the HS2 line.
