= Leeds Midland Road depot =

Railway locomotive and rolling stock depot in Leeds, England

Leeds Midland Road
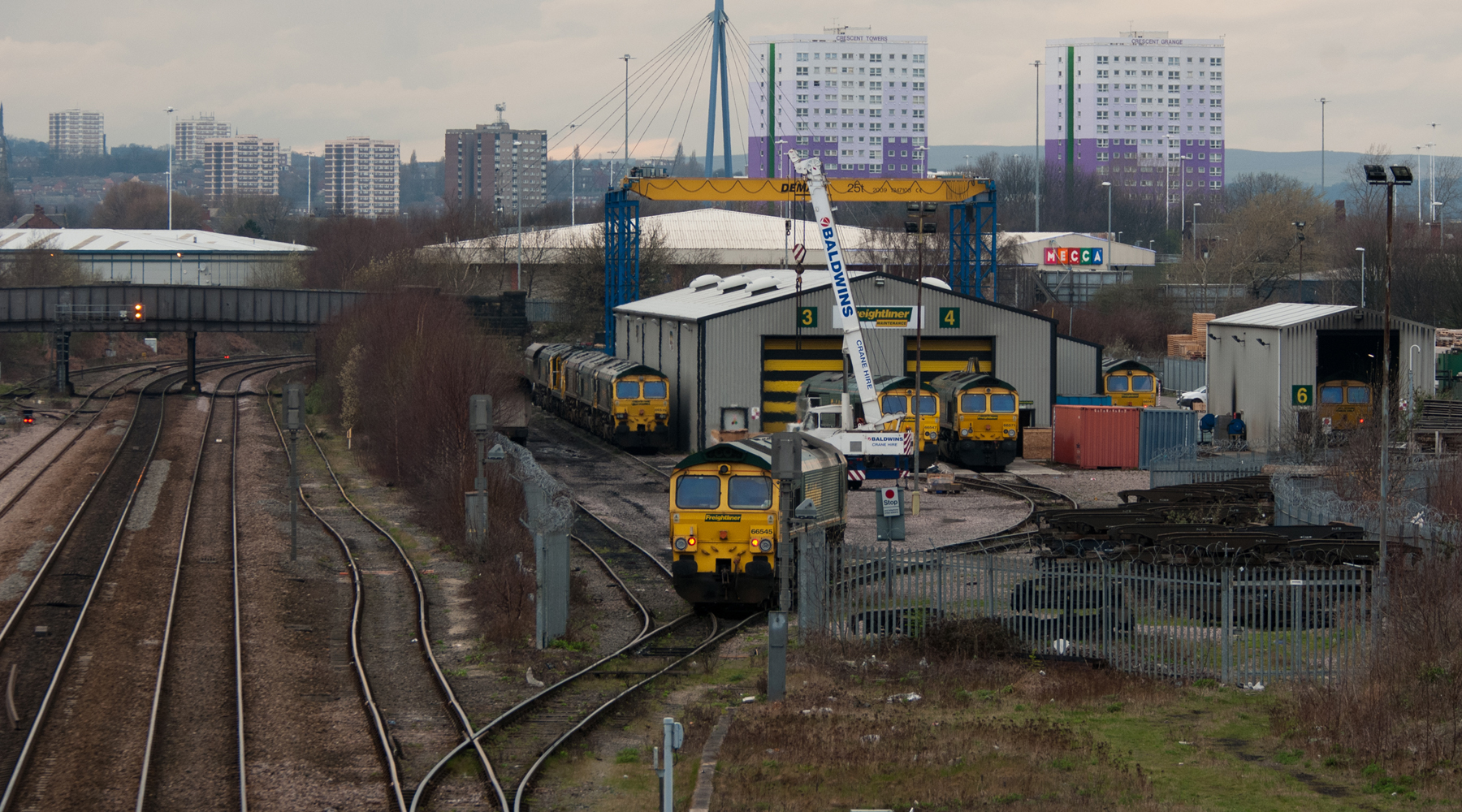
- The view from Pepper Road north west across Leeds Midland Road Depot. The lines on the left head towards Leeds station.
- Interactive map of Leeds Midland Road

Location
- Location: Leeds, West Yorkshire
- Coordinates: 53°46′30.8″N 1°31′40.1″W
- OS grid: SE312310

Characteristics
- Owner: Freightliner
- Operator: Freightliner
- Depot code: FD
- Type: Freight locomotive
- Roads: 10
- Rolling stock: Class 66; Class 70; Class 90

History
- Opened: July 2003

Leeds Midland Road depot is a locomotive and rolling stock maintenance facility located in Leeds, West Yorkshire, England. The site is located a few miles to the south-east of Leeds station on the line between Leeds and Castleford. Owned and operated by Freightliner, it is the heavy maintenance facility for its diesel and electric locomotives and wagon fleet.

== History ==
Leeds Midland Road depot was opened in 2003 by London & North Western Railway (LNWR) as a maintenance facility to maintain the Freightliner Class 66 fleet under a ten-year contract. and was located on the former Balm Road sidings that had been used to offload quarry products. LNWR were contracted to maintain up to 30 class 66 locomotives that worked in the Yorkshire area at the site, with heavier maintenance being carried out by Electro-Motive. In 2006, Freightliner Maintenance Limited (FML) was formed and assumed control of operations at Leeds. FML is a subsidiary of the Freightliner Group and was instituted when the number of locomotives and wagons the company leased or owned increased with an upsurge in traffic. Besides being a central point for maintaining the class 66 and Class 70 fleets, both classes are based from here and the facility undertakes wagon maintenance.

The site has a total of ten roads (Note: Initially, under the 2003 LNWR contract, the site had fewer roads, but more have been added over the years) the shed has two covered roads that have pits beneath them to allow access to the underside of wagons and locomotives, whilst the fuelling point also has two roads, but only one of these is covered. Outside of these, there are a further five roads for storage and maintenance. A 25-tonne (28-ton) crane spans roads 3 and 4 to allow for wheelset changes on locomotives and wagons.

As the site is 10 chains (660 ft; 200 m) north of Stourton Freightliner Terminal, locomotives in need of repair (or electric locomotives) are often hauled dead-in-train (DiT) to Stourton and transferred to Midland Road for servicing or repair. (Note: It is not uncommon for locomotives from Crewe being hauled DiT from Crewe to Southampton (intermodal terminal) and then being hauled DiT from Southampton to Leeds Stourton intermodal terminal to avoid needing a separate path direct between Crewe and Leeds) Locomotives on routine maintenance find their way to Midland Road by hauling scheduled services. Besides the container trains passing through Stourton to the south, many Heavy Haul trains run past the depot too, which makes switching locomotives easy and cost-effective.

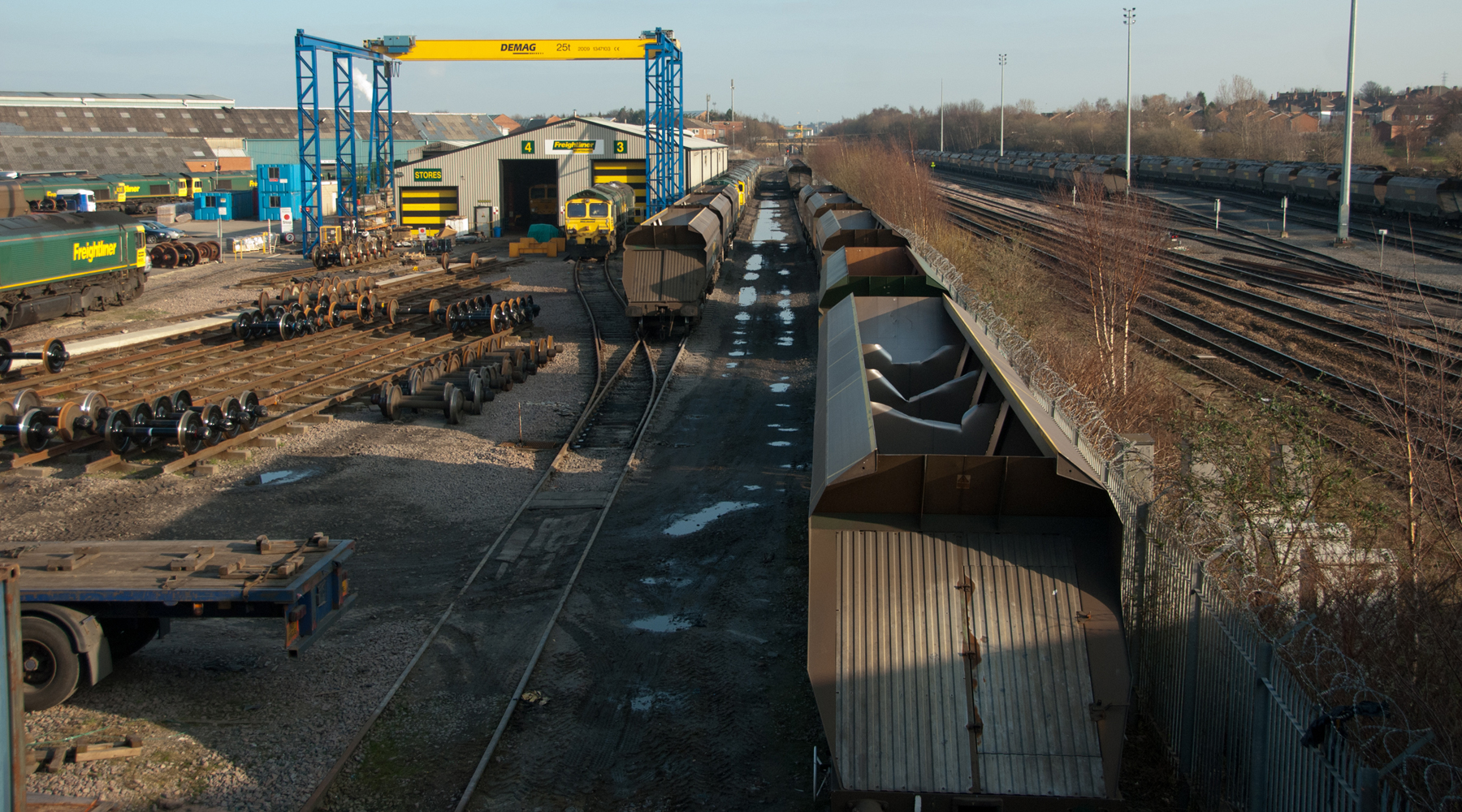
The view from Midland Road south east across Leeds Midland Road Depot showing the 25-tonne (28-ton) crane. The coal wagon nearest the camera has some internal damage awaiting repair.

With the downturn in tonnages of coal moved by railfreight in the United Kingdom, several examples of Class 70 locomotives have been stored on the non-maintenance sidings that border the running lines to the south.

In November 2017, Freightliner opened up a new maintenance facility at Crewe Basford Hall that has taken on some of the work previously undertaken at Leeds Midland Road, particularly the electric locomotives as there is no overhead wire access into Midland Road. The heavier maintenance work will still be carried at Leeds though.

The site is under threat from the High Speed 2 (HS2) project into central Leeds. The draft environmental statement for the West Midlands to Leeds arm of the HS2 line states that

The construction of the Proposed Scheme would also require the demolition of buildings and the acquisition of employment land at the Freightliner Maintenance site on Midland Road. This resource is deemed to be sensitive to this particular location as rail connectivity is imperative to the viability of the business and it cannot be easily relocated. This resource draws upon a specific local labour market and therefore provides economic opportunities to those seeking skilled manual employment in the south of Leeds. As such, the resource is considered to be highly sensitive to this displacement. The effect on this resource, and its employees, is assessed to be major adverse and therefore significant.
