= Arriva UK Trains =

Company that oversees Arriva's British train operations

- Type: Subsidiary
- Predecessor: Arriva and DB Regio's train operations in the UK
- Founded: 1996
- Headquarters: Sunderland, England, UK
- Key people: Dave Brown (Managing Director)
- Services: Train Operator
- Owner: I Squared Capital
- Parent: Arriva
- Subsidiaries: Arriva TrainCare; CrossCountry; Grand Central
- Website: www.arriva.co.uk/en/transport-modes/train-services

Arriva UK Trains Limited is the company that oversees Arriva's train operating companies in the United Kingdom. It gained its first franchises in February 2000. These were later lost, though several others were gained. In January 2010, with the take-over of Arriva by Deutsche Bahn, Arriva UK Trains also took over the running of those formerly overseen by DB Regio UK Limited.

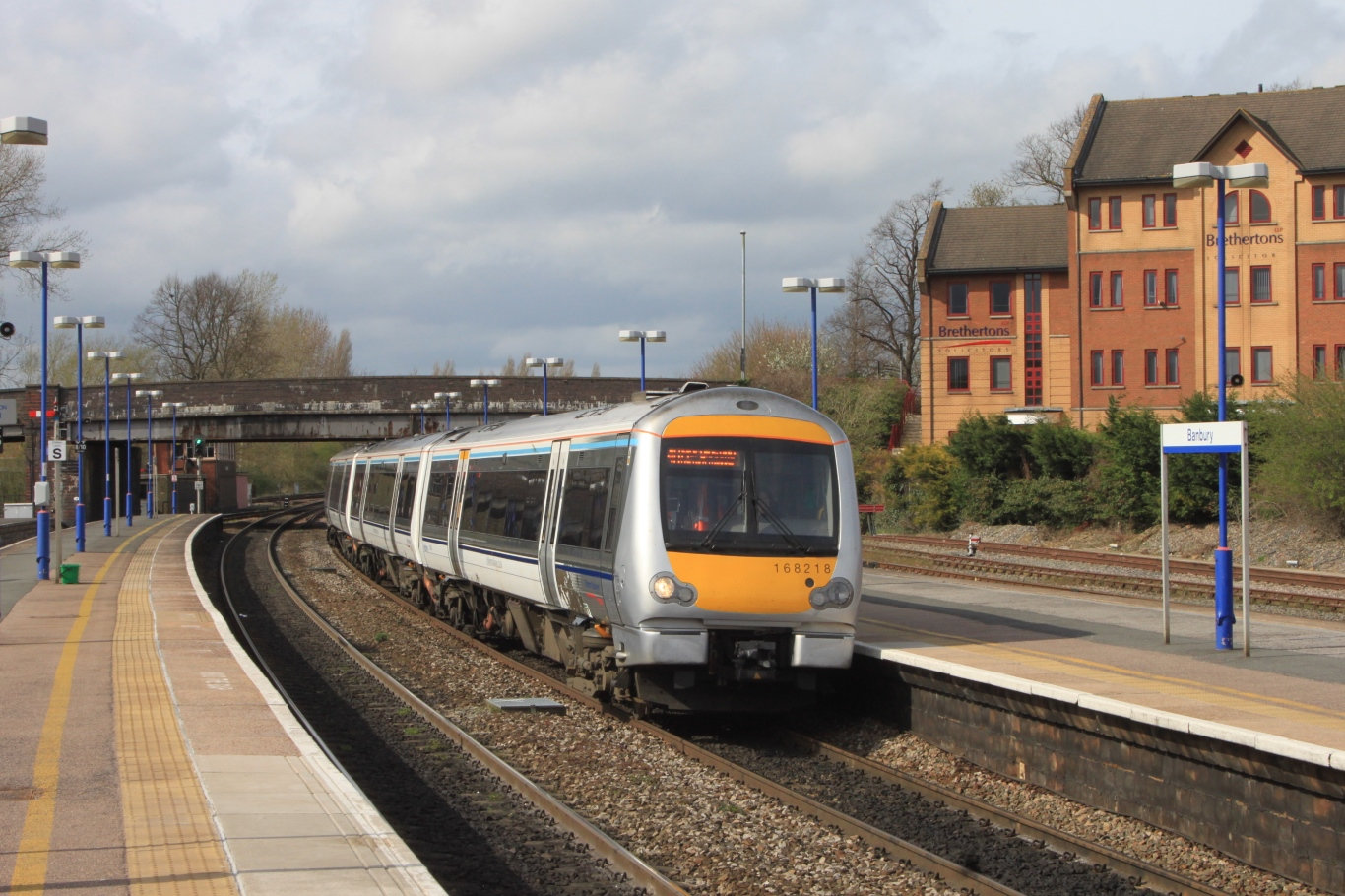
Chiltern Railways Class 168

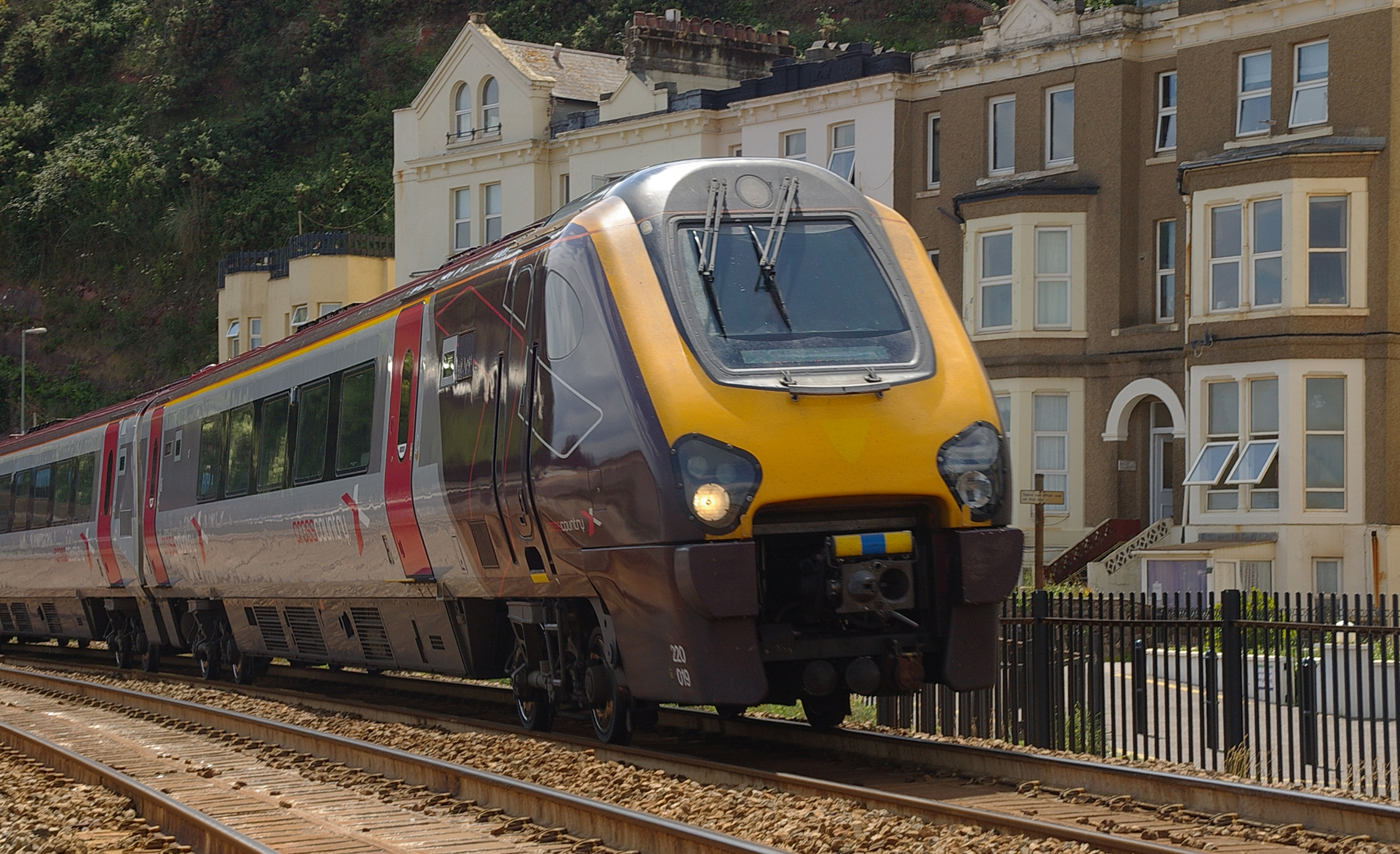
CrossCountry Class 220

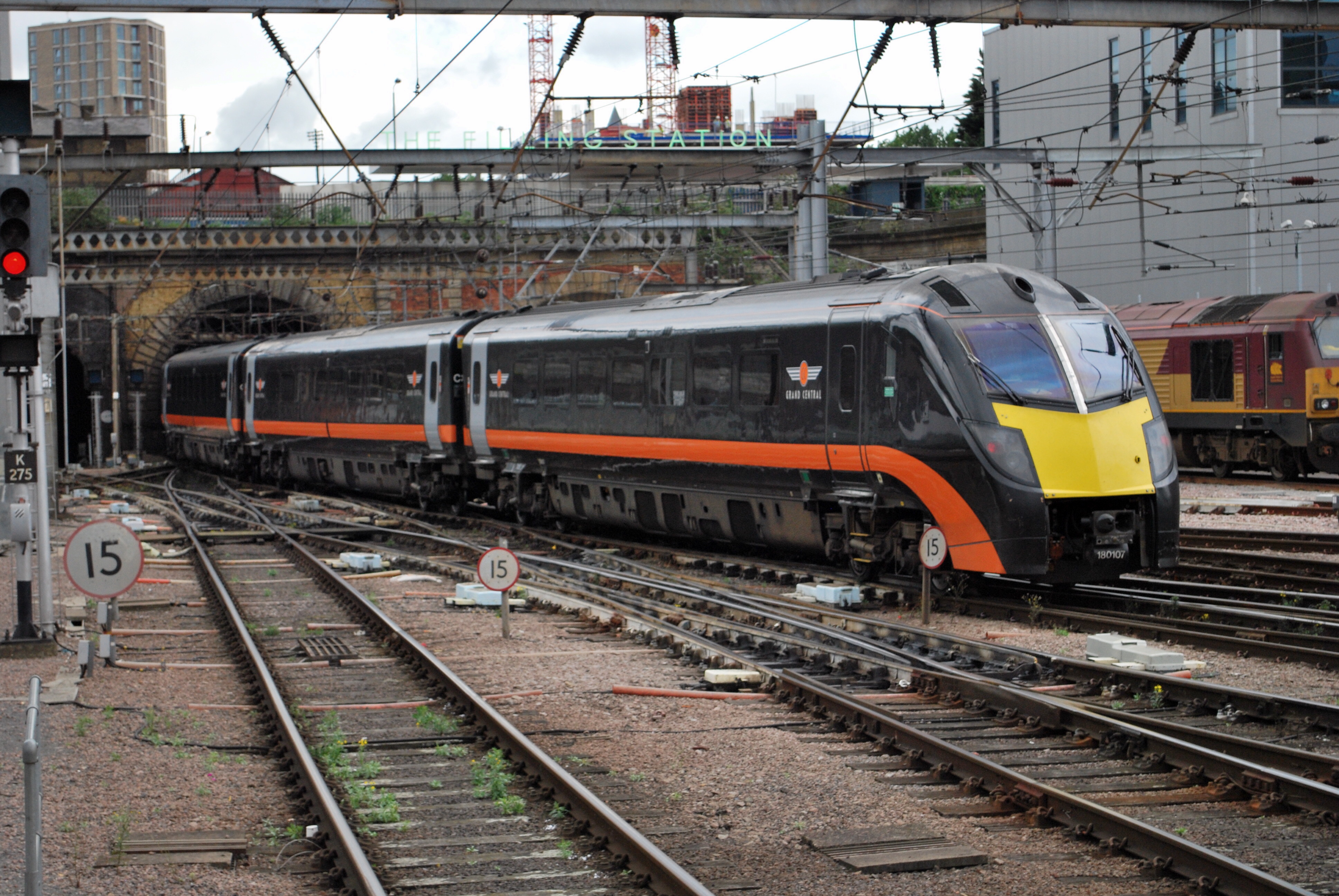
Grand Central Class 180

== Divisions ==
Arriva currently runs the following railway companies with operational dates listed:

Franchises:

- CrossCountry – 2007–2027

Open-access operators:

- Grand Central – 2007–present

Maintenance:

- Arriva TrainCare – rolling stock maintenance company

== History ==
=== Arriva's operations ===
==== Former operations ====
Arriva Trains Merseyside ran urban rail services on Merseyside from February 2000 until March 2003 and Arriva Trains Northern ran local rail services in Northern England from February 2000 until December 2004. Both franchises were lost to a 50:50 joint venture between Serco and NedRailways.

Arriva Trains Wales operated the majority of rail services in Wales, operating the Wales & Borders franchise from 7 December 2003 until 13 October 2018. This franchise was lost to KeolisAmey Wales.

Arriva Rail North operated the Northern franchise from April 2016 to 29 February 2020. This franchise was terminated and handed to the government-owned Northern Trains.

Arriva Rail London operated the London Overground concession from 13 November 2016 until 3 May 2026. The concession was then handed over to First Rail London.

Chiltern Railways operated commuter and regional routes on the Chiltern Main Line. The Chiltern franchise ran from 21 July 1996 to 20 September 2026, and operations were transferred to the state-owned train operating company of the same name.

==== Current operations ====
CrossCountry operates long-distance cross-country routes. The New Cross Country franchise runs from 11 November 2007 until October 2027.

Grand Central is an open-access operator operating from London King's Cross to Bradford Interchange and Sunderland. The operator runs from 18 December 2007 until December 2026.

Arriva TrainCare operates train maintenance depots at Bristol Barton Hill TMD, Cambridge, Crewe, Eastleigh and Newcastle upon Tyne.

=== Former DB Regio UK operations ===
In January 2008 it was announced that subject to regulatory approval, Deutsche Bahn would purchase Laing Rail which had itself just started operating the London Overground concession in partnership with MTR Corporation. As a result of the Deutsche Bahn purchase, Laing Rail Limited was renamed DB Regio UK Limited in April 2008.

DB Regio UK continued to expand when in February 2009 it was shortlisted and on 3 December 2009 awarded a contract to operate the Tyne & Wear Metro, taking over operations on 1 April 2010.

Following the purchase of Arriva by Deutsche Bahn in August 2010, Arriva UK Trains expanded to take over Deutsche Bahn's existing DB Regio UK division which consisted of Chiltern Railways, DB Regio Tyne & Wear, a 50% shareholding in the now closed Wrexham & Shropshire open access operation and a 50% shareholding in London Overground Rail Operations. The Tyne & Wear Metro contract with DB Regio did not renew, and Nexus took over the operation of the Tyne & Wear Metro in April 2017.

== Future ==
=== Post-merger growth strategy ===
Arriva UK Trains wishes to expand the number of UK Rail businesses it operates by developing open access operations and successfully bidding for further Department for Transport Rail Franchises. As part of this strategy in November 2011 Arriva bought open-access operator Grand Central for an undisclosed price. Disappointingly in the last full financial year before the purchase, Grand Central's seven return trains a day lost £8.5m leaving an overall deficit of £35m. Alliance Rail Holdings continues to develop new open access proposals following the rejection of their initial plans by the Office of Rail Regulation in 2011.

During 2012 Arriva's applications to bid for the InterCity West Coast, Greater Anglia, Essex Thameside and Thameslink franchises were all rejected by the Department for Transport. Following this run of failure Arriva was publicly critical of the government's prequalification process and called for it to be abolished. However Arriva was shortlisted to bid for the aborted Greater Western franchise in March 2012 and the Caledonian Sleeper and Crossrail franchises in 2014.

In June 2014 Alliance successfully concluded negotiations with Network Rail for access paths to run between Euston and Blackpool/Huddersfield and Leeds from 2017 using Pendolino trains. However, in January 2015 and despite Network Rail support, the Office of Rail Regulation refused all proposed GNWR services and the application for reasons that included protection of the revenues of Virgin Trains (the operator of the former InterCity West Coast franchise) and thence payments to the Department for Transport. Also because of capacity issues. This followed a proposed in December 2013 to run services between King's Cross and Skipton via Garforth and Keighley, but was rejected in 2014, by the Office of Rail Regulation.

Alliance submitted an amended application which was accepted in August 2015, and plan from 2018 to commence operating services from London Euston to Poulton-le-Fylde after the Office of Rail and Road granted access rights for 10 years.
