= Arriva TrainCare =

Railway rolling stock maintenance company

- Founded: 1993
- Founder: Pete Waterman
- Headquarters: Crewe, England
- Number of locations: 5
- Services: Railway rolling stock maintenance
- Parent: Arriva UK Trains
- Website: www.arrivatc.com

Arriva TrainCare (formerly London & North Western Railway (LNWR)) is a railway rolling stock maintenance company. It is presently a wholly owned subsidiary of Arriva UK Trains.

It was established as LNWR by Pete Waterman during 1993; in under a decade, it had become the largest privately owned provider of rail maintenance services in the UK. It started providing maintenance services to various train operating companies in 1999. Its initial facility was in Crewe, a second maintenance depot in Leeds was launched in 2004. Multiple locations, such as Bristol, Cambridge, Eastleigh, and Newcastle, were integrated into the business during the early 2010s.

In November 2008, Arriva UK Trains acquired LNWR, after which it was reorganised. It became the default servicing agent for the rolling stock of Arriva UK Trains' various subsidiaries. The company has also carried out extensive overhauls on operator's whole fleets, as well as the restoration of several heritage locomotives. Arriva TrainCare has sought to achieve a high standard of working practice and to improve conditions for its employees and various stakeholders.

== History ==
The company was founded in 1993 as London & North Western Railway (LNWR) by the British record producer Pete Waterman to provide maintenance for locomotives and rolling stock for specialist and charter operators from premises in Crewe. During 1999, it began maintaining rolling stock for various train operating companies (TOCs). By 2002, LNWR had reportedly become the largest privately owned provider of rail maintenance services in the UK.

In 2004, a facility in Leeds was opened to service Freightliner Class 66 diesel locomotives; this depot was subsequently sold to Freightliner.

In November 2008, LNWR was acquired by Arriva UK Trains in exchange for £2.4 million. Waterman remained with the company as its chairman for numerous years following the acquisition.

In 2011, amid a restructuring of DB Schenker, a sister to Arriva company, several facilities in Bristol, Cambridge, Eastleigh, and Newcastle-upon-Tyne were integrated into LNWR.

During May 2017, members of the National Union of Rail, Maritime and Transport Workers (RMT) trade union voted in favour of industrial action in response to a recent pay offer by Arriva TrainCare.

In addition to the servicing of trains for Arriva UK Trains' subsidiaries, the company services various forms of rolling stock for other companies, such as Bombardier Transportation (CrossCountry and Avanti West Coast Class 220/221 Voyagers), Freightliner (Class 86s and 90s) and Siemens (West Midlands Trains Class 350s). It also conducts heavy overhauls on rolling stock, and extensive restorations of heritage locomotives. It routinely handles various forms of waste, including asbestos, scrap metal, electronic waste, various oils, and hazardous/confidential materials, yet Arriva TrainCare has reportedly achieved a recycling rate of 99.68 percenter overall, having engaged with specialist waste services to handle all materials in a fully compliant manner.
