= Bristol Barton Hill TMD =

Railway maintenance depot in Barton Hill, Bristol

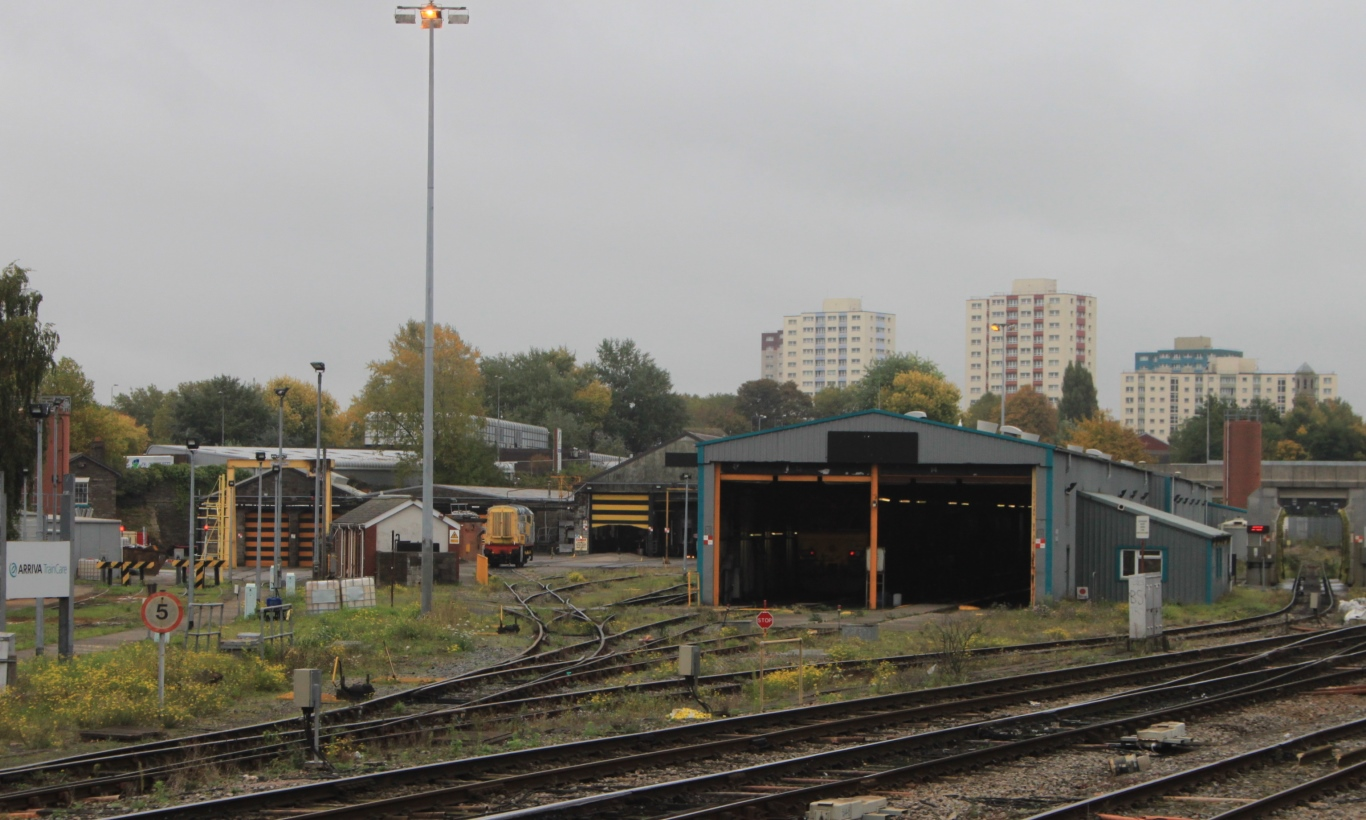
- Interactive map of Bristol Barton Hill TMD

Location
- Location: Barton Hill, Bristol
- Coordinates: 51.4533°N 2.5702°W
- OS grid: ST604728

Characteristics
- Owner: Network Rail
- Operator: Arriva TrainCare
- Depot code: BK
- Type: DMU, Diesel

History
- Opened: 1840

Bristol Barton Hill TMD is a traction maintenance depot located in Barton Hill, Bristol, England. The depot is located on the Great Western Main Line to the north-east of Bristol Temple Meads station.

== History ==
Bristol Barton Hill TMD opened 1840 as locomotive depot. From 1870 it was used as a carriage and wagon depot. In 1960, a new shed was built to service the Blue Pullman.

Locomotives returned in July 1995 when the depot was taken over by Rail Express Systems (RES) after Bristol Bath Road TMD closed. In 1996 it was included in the sale of RES to EWS.

In 2001 it resumed servicing passenger stock with Virgin CrossCountry Class 220 and Class 221s being serviced overnight. In 2004, stored Class 56 locomotives were reactivated at Barton Hill before being exported to France.

In 2011 Barton Hill was transferred within the Arriva UK Trains group from Axiom to Arriva TrainCare. As such it has also performed overhaul work on trains for Arriva Rail North, Arriva Trains Wales and First Great Western (Class 158s), Chiltern Railways (Mark 3s) and Tyne & Wear Metrocars.

As at September 2022, five CrossCountry sets were serviced at Barton Hill each night; four Class 220/221s and one Class 170.

== Incidents ==
CrossCountry 221129 derailed on 24 March 2014 just outside of the depot. The train suffered minor damage and nobody was injured, but the track was heavily damaged, being pulled 6 inches sideways and sleeves being destroyed along with cables and the track needed grinding down.
