= Stourton Freightliner Terminal =

Intermodal railway terminal in Leeds, West Yorkshire, England

Stourton Freightliner terminal
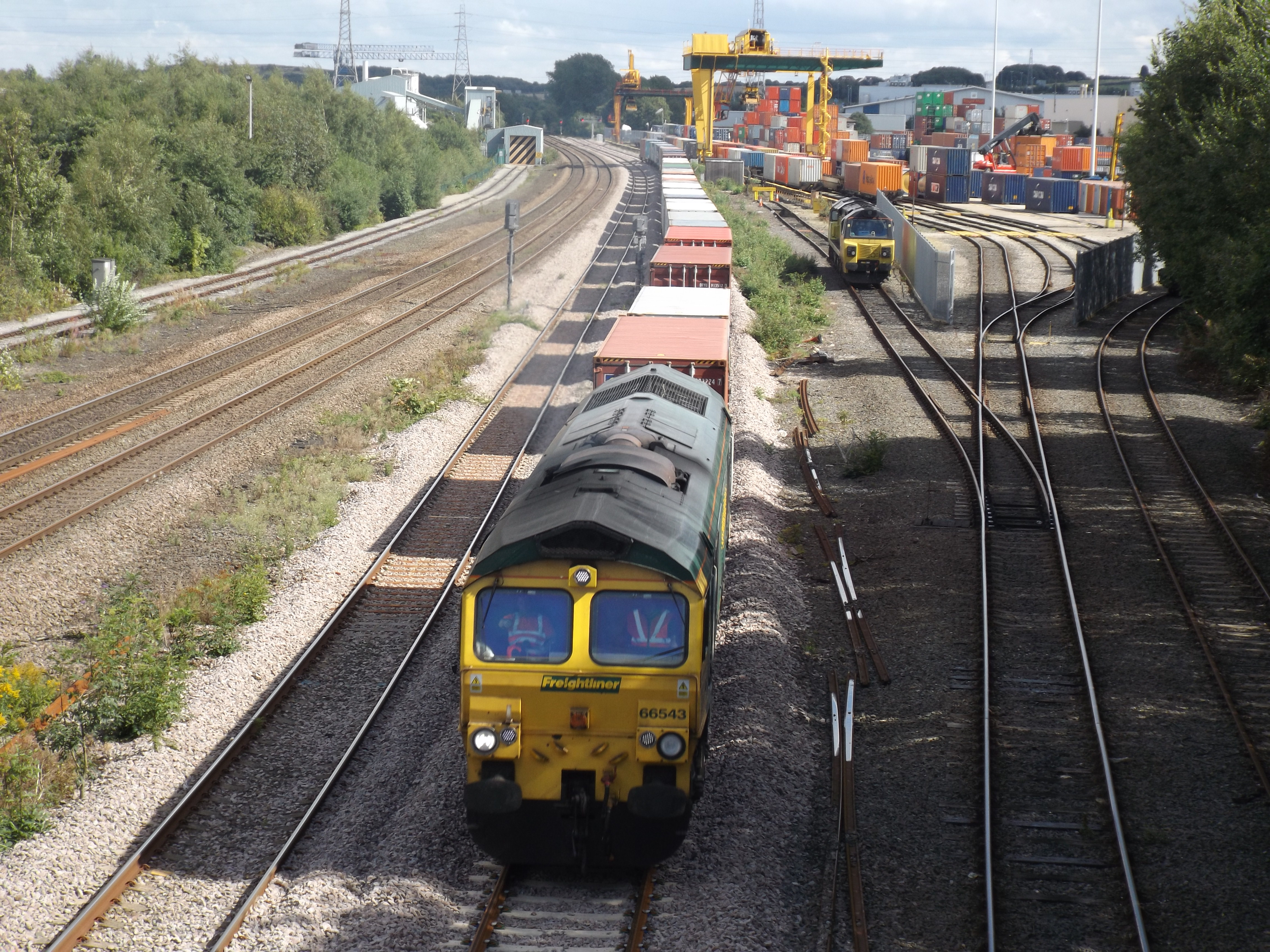
- Stourton Freightliner container terminal looking south eastwards
- Interactive map of Stourton Freightliner terminal
- Location within England

Location
- Country: England
- Location: Stourton, Leeds
- Coordinates: 53.768°N 1.510°W
- UN/LOCODE: GB SYR

Details
- Opened: 1967
- Operated by: Freightliner Group
- Type of Harbor: Intermodal terminal
- Land area: 14.3 acres (5.8 ha)
- Rail lines: Hallam Line
- Rail gauge: 4 ft 8 1/2 in (1,435 mm)
- Street access: M1 motorway M621 motorway A639 road

Statistics
- Website; Official webpage

Stourton Freightliner Terminal (Stourton FLT), is a railfreight intermodal transport hub located in Stourton, Leeds, England. It is operated by the Freightliner Group, and has services arriving and departing for ports in Felixstowe, Southampton and Tilbury in the south of England. Stourton serves as a dedicated collection and delivery point for containers across Yorkshire, with a minor sub-service to Teesport in Middlesbrough by rail.

The site was opened in July 1967 by British Rail as part of its dedicated Freightliner brand. Between the closure of many intermodal terminals in the 1980s, and the prospect of a resurgence in Channel Tunnel traffic, Stourton was the only intermodal terminal in Yorkshire between 1987 and 1994.

== History ==
When the Freightliner brand was introduced by British Rail (BR) in the 1960s, three of the initial 17 terminals would be in the Yorkshire region (Hull, Leeds and Sheffield). The site was built on the former Stourton sidings, which were earmarked for investment as a marshalling yard under the 1955 modernisation plan, though this never came to fruition. After the mass closure of Freightliner terminals across the UK in 1986 and 1987, Leeds Stourton remained the only Yorkshire based terminal. (Note: Of the original 17 terminals, one was in Stockton (then County Durham). It was deemed as being poorly sited for the Teesside industrial region and was moved to Wilton on the south bank of the River Tees in 1984. This placed it in the ceremonial county of North Yorkshire (then Cleveland). It has also since moved a second time, in 2014, now being located at Teesport alongside other railfreight intermodal operations run by competitors.) Stourton is also one of only five of the original 1960s batch of terminals still in operation (the others being Garston in Liverpool, Lawley Street in Birmingham, Southampton Millbrook and Trafford Park in Manchester).

Opened in July 1967, the site is located on the former Stourton steam shed, and at its opening covered over 11 acres (4.5 ha).

Under British Rail in 1994, the prospect of Channel Tunnel traffic, led to BR developing a new intermodal terminal at Wakefield Europort, which in the post-privatisation era has been operated by Freightliner Group competitor DB Cargo UK. During this period, the terminal at Stourton was handling an average of 65,000 containers every year. Originally, British Rail wanted to develop Stourton into a single terminal for both deep-sea, domestic and Channel Tunnel traffic, so the site would be similar to that at Trafford Park in Manchester, where the two intermodal terminals are quite close. However, the upgrade at Stourton wasn't eligible for a European Economic Community grant, but the Wakefield site was.

Throughout the 1990s and the 2000s, the typical destinations served by Leeds Stourton have been the ports at Felixstowe, Southampton and Tilbury, with feeder services to Crewe Basford Hall and Wilton, or Teesport terminals on Teesside. After the opening of London Gateway in 2014, Stourton has been one of the new services from that location. During the late 1980s, a feeder service operated between the Port of Immingham and Stourton.

== Future ==
In 2018, the typical number of train movements to and from Stourton was 14. The projected traffic growth in intermodal containers is estimated to increase to 47 trains per day by 2043.

== Access and layout ==
The terminal can only be operated by diesel trains as no electric wires (catenary) exist on this stretch of line. The section south has been mooted in the railway press as an 'infill' electrification project; from Stourton terminal to Hare Park Junction (on the Doncaster to Wakefield Line), is 18 miles (29 km). The electrification of the line between Whitehall Junction (Leeds) and Hare Park Junction (on the Leeds to Doncaster line), appeared as a desired future project in Network Rail's Freight Network Study of 2017.

Aside from the arrival siding, the main part of the terminal consists of three through lines with gantry cranes straddling all three. The site covers 14.3 acres (5.8 ha), and has the capacity to store 1,150 standard containers (rated as TEU). Stourton is located on Valley Farm Way in Stourton, a suburb of south Leeds, with road access to the M1 motorway, the M621 motorway and the A639 road.

== See also ==
- Leeds Midland Road depot - the Freightliner maintenance facility close by.
