= Wakefield Europort =

Intermodal railfreight terminal in Wakefield, West Yorkshire, England

Coordinates: 53.714702°N 1.408298°W

Wakefield Europort is a rail-connected warehousing and industrial estate located to the northeast of Wakefield at junction 31 of the M62 motorway in West Yorkshire, England. It opened in 1996 in anticipation of increased international railfreight due to the construction of the Channel Tunnel. As of 2012 the site employs over 3,000 persons, and has motorway, high capacity rail, and waterway (canal) transport access.

== Location and background ==
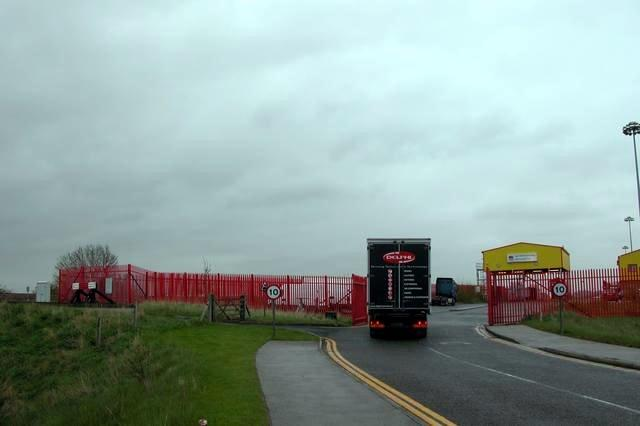
Entrance to the facility

The site is approximately 3 miles (5 km) northeast of Wakefield, and 2 miles (3 km) west of Castleford on the north side of the M62 directly west of its junction with the A655 road. It is mostly within the civil parish of Normanton, West Yorkshire, and surrounded by the townships of Altofts, Whitwood, and Normanton. Other industrial and commercial developments including the Diggerland theme park are located to the east and south.

The River Calder and Aire and Calder Navigation canal form the northern boundary, the site is trisected by two parts of the Hallam Line which branches at Altofts Junction; the former North Midland Railway, and the former York and Normanton Line of the York & North Midland Railway from which the rail port branches. The site of the defunct Altofts and Whitwood railway station is within the estate.

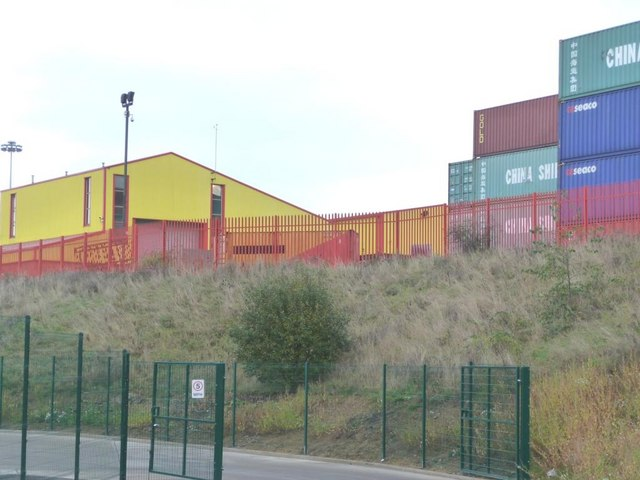
The site in 2009

Historically the site was used for agricultural purposes until the late 19th century, when coal mining began in the area at West Riding Colliery. (Note: Opened by Pope and Pearson, also known as the West Riding and Silkstone Collieries.) Coal mines and associated terraced housing (Providence Row, and Silkstone Row) were built, along with a gas works, coke ovens and a dock (later staithes) on the Aire and Calder Canal. The site continued to be used for coal mining until closure in the 1960s, both the colliery and associated housing were cleared in the 1970s.

In response to sanctioning of construction of the Channel Tunnel by the Channel Tunnel Act 1987, a number of schemes for rail-connected intermodal terminals and distribution centres were put forward in expectation of additional rail freight flow to be serviced; in 1989 terminals in Leeds and Doncaster were proposed. In 1990, Railfreight Distribution backed a plan to build a terminal at Wakefield instead of Leeds.

Initially the terminal was planned to be south of the M62 at the former Normanton marshalling yards but was locally opposed. The alternative site included green belt land and required a public enquiry: in 1992 the 350 acres (140 ha) development was officially sanctioned by the Secretary of State John Gummer due to its strategic importance. The development was backed by Wakefield Metropolitan District Council (underwriter), British Rail (Railfreight Distribution: operator) and AMEC subsidiary AMEC developments (developer).

In 1996 the terminal opened, operated by Railfreight Distribution. (Note: Railfreight Distribution was privatised and acquired by EWS in 1997.) Due to the international nature of the channel tunnel freight, the terminal was operated at a higher security level than standard rail yards. The railfreight terminal occupied only 8 acres (3.25 ha) of the site.

By 1998 the terminal was handling 2,500 units per annum mostly swap bodies with one or less train per day operating, typically hauled in the UK by British Rail Class 47s, later replaced by newer Class 66 as introduced; the logistics park had been more successful creating 500 jobs. By 2000 over ten clients had occupied buildings including Asda and Royal Mail.

In 2000 Wakefield council gave planning permission to Lafarge Redland Aggregates (part of Lafarge) for the construction of an aggregate handling wharf at the site on the Aire and Calder Canal, the wharf became operational in 2001.

By 2009 the railport was working at approximately half capacity and handling one intermodal container train from Tilbury and Felixstowe per weekday and two per day from Southampton (600,000 t p.a.).

The site was identified in 2009 by the Railfreight Investment Interest Group (RIIG) as one of three 'Strategic Railfreight Interchanges' (SRFI) in England together with Hams Hall and DIRFT. As of 2011 the railport is operated by EWS successor DB Schenker Rail (UK); the site as a whole employed 3,500 people.

=== Site description ===
Although the rail terminal is centrally located in the development, it lacks directly associated warehousing and is used only for intermodal transfers. As of 2009 its rail access was cleared to loading gauge W9, with an expectation of being upgraded to W10 by 2011. The rest of the development is divided into four industrial/commercial estates; Normandy Park and Rhine Park (total 84 acres [34 ha]) located on reclaimed colliery spoil heaps and rail yard, Valencia Park (64 acres [26 ha]), and Tuscany Park (190 acres [75 ha]). The 99 acres (40 ha) Whitwood Industrial estate predates the Europort and is located close by.

== See also ==
- Strategic rail freight interchange
