= 1996 in rail transport =

This article lists events related to rail transport that occurred in 1996.

== Events ==
=== January events ===
- January 6 – A computer-controlled Washington Metro train overruns the platform at the Shady Grove station, colliding with a parked train and fatally injuring the operator.

=== February events ===
- February 4 – The first two British passenger train operating companies begin operation of their service franchises as part of the privatisation of British Rail: South West Trains (part of the Stagecoach Group) and Great Western Trains (Great Western Holdings).
- February 9 - 1996 Secaucus train collision: A southbound New Jersey Transit train (Train #1254) bound for Hoboken Terminal collides nearly head-on with a northbound NJ Transit train (Train #1107) heading to Suffern. 3 People are killed.
- February 10 – Woodlands Extension of the MRT North South line in Singapore opened, adding six new stations to the current network.
- February 16 – 1996 Maryland train collision: A Chicago bound Amtrak train, the Capitol Limited, collides with a MARC commuter train bound for Washington, killing 11 people.
- February 19 – Approximately 1,000 passengers are trapped in the Channel Tunnel when two Eurostar trains break down due to electronic failures caused by snow and ice.
- February 24 – The three British trainload freight companies, Loadhaul, Mainline Freight and Transrail, are acquired by North & South Railways, a subsidiary of Wisconsin Central, as part of the privatisation of British Rail.

=== March events ===
- March 4 – Weyauwega, Wisconsin derailment: A Wisconsin Central freight train derails on a broken switch in Weyauwega, Wisconsin. The derailment forces the evacuation of the entire town until March 20 while fire crews work to control the resulting blaze.
- March 15 – Amtrak selects the "American Flyer" design developed by Bombardier and Alstom, based on the TGV trains of France, as the design model for its Acela rolling stock.
- March 18 – SNCF begins a construction project to renew the track ballast on the Paris-Lyon TGV line; the project is expected to last through 2006.
- March 20
  - In Seoul, South Korea:
    - A section of Line 5 of the Seoul Metropolitan Subway is opened independently from Banghwa to Kkachisan (8.8 km (5.5 mi)).
    - A branch of Line 2 of the Seoul Metropolitan Subway is opened from Sindorim to Kkachisan.
- March 28
  - Muzha Line of Taipei Mass Rapid Transit, the first rapid transit line of Taiwan, opens.
  - Freight services between Higashi-Yokoze freight terminal and Shin-Akitsu on the Seibu Ikebukuro Line in Japan are discontinued.
- March 30
  - Opening of the first 4.9 km (3.0 mi) section of the Rinkai Line between Shin-Kiba and Tokyo Teleport stations in Tokyo, Japan.
  - In Seoul, South Korea, a branch of Line 5 of the Seoul Metropolitan Subway is opened from Macheon to Gangdong (6.9 km (4.3 mi)). At this point, trains operate from Wangsinmi to Sangil-dong or Macheon, branching from Gangdong.
- March – Government of Guatemala suspends operation on the entire 885 km (550 mi) Ferrocarriles de Guatemala network.

=== April events ===
- April 14 – The British trainload freight company North & South Railways Ltd becomes EWS.
- April 21 – The Jokela rail accident, a derailment in thick fog, kills 4 in Tuusula, Finland.
- April 27 – The Tōyō Rapid Railway Line, connecting Nishi-Funabashi and Katsutadai opens in Chiba Prefecture, Japan.
- April 28 – Further British train operating companies begin operation of their passenger service franchises as part of the privatisation of British Rail: Gatwick Express and Midland Mainline (both National Express) and Great North Eastern Railway (Sea Containers).

=== May events ===
- May 4 – Purchase by the Dakota, Minnesota and Eastern Railroad of the former Chicago & North Western branch lines from Rapid City, South Dakota to Colony, Wyoming and Crawford, Nebraska becomes effective.
- May 12 – The Green Line of the Chicago Transit Authority elevated and subway rail system, returns to service after a 2-year reconstruction period. Many stations were still incomplete, while six other stations (including, Halsted, Homan, 58th, 61st, Racine, and University) were closed permanently.
- May 17 – Canadian National's Beachburg Subdivision between Pembroke and Nipissing, 126 miles (203 km) of track which traversed Algonquin Provincial Park, is officially abandoned.
- May 20 – The British railway infrastructure management company, Railtrack, is privatised, being floated on the London Stock Exchange with shares worth 360p.
- May 26 – Further British train operating companies begin operation of their passenger service franchises in England as part of the privatisation of British Rail: Connex South Central and LTS Rail.

=== June events ===
- June 2 – First part of the Belgian High Speed line (HSL 1, from Antoing to the French Border) put into service, continuing the French LGV Nord.
- June 26 – The Atlanta & St Andrews Bay Railroad and the A&G Railroad merge to form the Bay Line Railroad.

=== July events ===
- July 21 – British train operating company Chiltern Railways begins operation of its passenger service franchise in England as part of the privatisation of British Rail, following a management buyout.
- July 24 – The Dehiwala train bombing carried out by the LTTE kills 64 people.
- July 26 – Conventional rail world speed record of 443.0 km/h (275.3 mph) attained by the JR Central "300X" six-car train between Kyoto and Maibara on the Tokaido Shinkansen.
- July 27 – Ron Burns becomes president of Union Pacific.
- July 28 – The Talleyr and Terminal Railroad (a subsidiary of Genesee & Wyoming) begins operations in Jacksonville, Florida.
- July 31 – Canadian Pacific makes the last run of a grain load in a 40 ft (12 m) boxcar with the final deliveries of grain to Thunder Bay, Ontario.
- July 31 – The first low-floor light rail car in North America is received (from its manufacturer, Siemens) by Portland, Oregon's TriMet.

=== August events ===
- August 12 – In Seoul, South Korea, the northern section of Line 5 of the Seoul Metropolitan Subway is extended from Yeouido to Kkachisan (6.9 km (4.3 mi)).
- August 19 – Metra's North Central Service commuter rail line begins operations on the Milwaukee District West Line and on the Wisconsin Central Railroad between Union Station in downtown Chicago and Antioch.

=== September events ===
- September 11 – Union Pacific finishes the acquisition that was effectively begun almost a century before with the purchase of the Southern Pacific. The merged company retains the name "Union Pacific" for all railroad operations.
- September 14 – The York–Durham Heritage Railway begins operations on Canadian National's former branch between Uxbridge and Stouffville, Ontario.

=== October events ===
- October 1 – The Norwegian Railway Inspectorate is created.
- October 11 – In Seoul, South Korea, Line 7 of the Seoul Metropolitan Subway is opened from Jangnam to Koknuk University (19.0 km (11.8 mi)).
- October 13 – Further British train operating companies begin operation of their passenger service franchises as part of the privatisation of British Rail: Cardiff Railway Company (operating as Valley Lines) and Wales & West (both subsidiaries of Prism Rail); Connex South Eastern; Island Line, Isle of Wight (Stagecoach Group); and Thames Trains (Go-Ahead Group).
- October – The first stage of Cairo Metro's Line Two (the Yellow line) opens.

=== November events ===
- November 18 – Channel Tunnel fire seriously damaging 200 m of the tunnel's lining.
- November 21 – Limited freight service in the Channel Tunnel resumes while construction crews make repairs at the location of the fire three days earlier.
- November 23 – In Seoul, South Korea, Line 8 of the Seoul Metropolitan Subway is opened from Jamsil to Moran (13.1 km (8.1 mi)).

=== December events ===
- December 1 – Norwegian State Railways is split into the Norwegian National Rail Administration and Norges Statsbaner.
- December 4 – Passenger service resumes through the Channel Tunnel.
- December 5
  - BNSF reopens Stampede Pass in Washington and resumes operating freight trains over the line.
  - Canadian National operates its last train of grain to be hauled in 40 ft (12 m) boxcars; CN SD40s numbered 5256 and 5051 depart Canora, Saskatchewan, with a train of 114 such boxcars bound for Winnipeg, Manitoba, and Thunder Bay, Ontario.
- December 11 – Opening of the second phase of the Osaka Rapid Electric Tramway Line No. 7 (高速電気軌道第7号線) (Nagahori Tsurumi-ryokuchi Line) between Kyōbashi and Shinsaibashi.
- December 16 – Opening of Malaysia's first metro line, the LRT STAR Line (Chinese: 实达轻快铁) from Ampang to Sultan Ismail in the Kuala Lumpur, the capital of Malaysia.
- December 30
  - Dallas Area Rapid Transit opens the first line of Trinity Railway Express between Dallas and Irving, Texas.
  - The Brahmaputra Mail train bombing: a bomb explodes a train travelling in Lower Assam in Eastern India, totally destroying three carriages of the train and derailing six more, killing at least 33 people.
  - In Seoul, South Korea, Line 5 of the Seoul Metropolitan Subway is extended from Wangsimni to Yeouido (14.1 km (8.8 mi)). This would be the line's fourth expansion in ten months, connecting the two pre-existing sections in the process.
- December 31 – Burlington Northern and the Atchison, Topeka & Santa Fe Railway merge to form BNSF.

== Deaths ==
=== January deaths ===
- January 3 – Terence Cuneo, British railway artist (born 1907).

=== May deaths ===
- May 9 – Carl Fallberg, cartoonist who created Fiddletown & Copperopolis (born 1915).
