= Railfreight =

Sector of British Rail

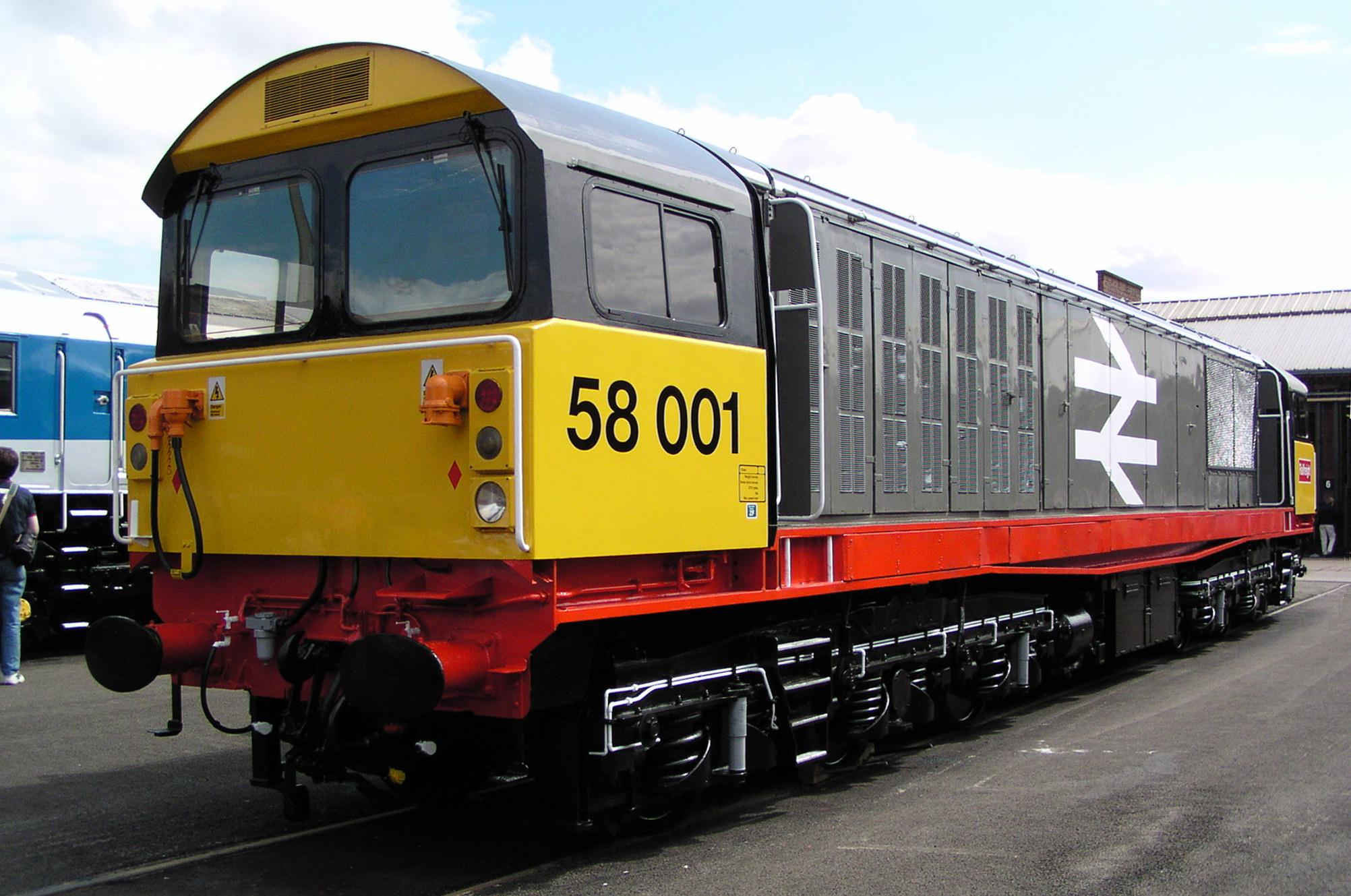
- 58001 at Doncaster Works
- Company type: State owned
- Industry: Rail freight
- Founded: 1982
- Defunct: 1994
- Fate: Split into regional sectors for privatisation
- Successor: 1994: Loadhaul, Mainline Freight, Transrail; 1995: Freightliner
- Services: Intermodal, Wagonload freight, unit trains
- Parent: British Rail
- Divisions: Railfreight Distribution. Trainload: Metals, Petroleum, Coal.

Railfreight was a sector of British Rail responsible for all freight operations on the British network. The division was created in 1982 when BR sought to assign particular stock and management to the evolving requirements of freight traffic.

== History ==
Railfreight existed as a single unit from 1982 until 1987 as the rail freight division of British Rail. In 1987 BRs freight operations were further divided according to the type of train operated and material carried: the Trainload Freight division and its sub-sectors handled unit trains of coal, metal, aggregates, oil or petroleum, LPG, petro-chemicals, and construction materials; while Railfreight Distribution handled intermodal, non-unit train work and channel tunnel freight. Activities which were not assigned to one of the new Trainload Freight or Railfreight Distribution sub-sectors were then continued under the Railfreight General banner. Railfreight General was dissolved in 1989, its limited responsibilities being taken over by Railfreight Distribution.

== Brand ==
Railfreight's image had lagged behind the image of the other areas of British Rail, and staff morale reflected this. As part of major restructuring as traffic moved away from wagonload and towards unit trains and containerization, British Rail commissioned a major redesign of the brand from locomotive down to depot entry sign. Roundel Design Group took inspiration from aircraft squadron markings, distinct and visible from a distance, which would also look well even when soiled. To improve staff morale, over £8 million were invested in depot facilities, giving them a bright and fresh appearance, improving crew spaces, and catching up on overdue maintenance. Unique plaques that represented major depots were applied to locomotives and some rolling stock; with equipment easily identifiable as to its home depot, staff felt motivated to take more care in maintaining the locomotives assigned to them.

The rebranding extended beyond just rolling stock and locomotives: signage, depots and vehicles also received the new paint schemes and logos to tie the sectors together. The use of Rail Alphabet, however, remained consistent with the rest of British Rail.

=== Logos ===
In 1987, British Rail unveiled a new brand and image for Railfreight, introducing six logos for the six new sectors that Railfreight was divided into: Railfreight (Note: Later known as 'Railfreight General'.), Speedlink Distribution (Note: Later known as 'Railfreight Distribution'), Railfreight Petroleum, Railfreight Coal, Railfreight Construction and Railfreight Metals. One of the more subtle aspects was a 'vertical marker strip' used to tie publications, equipment and signage together, which duplicated the distinctive aspect of the main logo, such as 'triangles' for Speedlink Distribution and rectangles for General.

=== Livery ===
==== Railfreight grey ====
The Railfreight sector was immediately identifiable through the introduction of a new 'Railfreight Grey' livery, which was revealed in 1982 alongside one of the new Class 58 locomotives for which it was originally developed. It was then soon applied to most of the locomotives and rolling stock assigned to the division. This new colour scheme was very distinctive on the British network, as it represented the first clear break from the universal application of variations of Rail Blue for 15 years.

==== Railfreight red stripe ====
The new livery was further distinguished, in locomotive classes where the bodywork was mounted on a solebar (such as the Class 58 and Class 20), by painting the solebar red to give a distinctive red stripe running the length of the lower bodyside. This variant was known as 'Railfreight Red Stripe'. Other classes of locomotives with an integrated monocoque construction (and thus no solebar), such as the Class 26, Class 31, Class 37, Class 47 and Class 56, also had red stripes applied to the lower body side.

==== Two-tone grey ====
Some of the monocoque locomotives briefly acquired a red stripe in 1987; however, following the creation of Trainload Freight and Railfreight Distribution in 1987, they were soon repainted in the new sub-sector two-tone grey livery with appropriate decals. Four remaining Railfreight locomotives and rolling stock, not assigned to the sub-sectors, were painted in two-tone grey livery with dedicated Railfreight General decals.
In 1992, Freight Connection 92 saw three Class 90s repainted into fictional interpretations of liveries from France, Germany and Belgium. Following the event, it was suggested by the personnel responsible for painting the locomotives that Railfreight Distribution adopt the French paint scheme. After some reworking, the design for the modified livery was finalised in March 1993; it revised the proportions of the grey sections and changed the roof colour slightly. Most noticeable was the inclusion of "Railfreight Distribution" on the sides, the only sector to have its sector name displayed on locomotives.

Railfreight liveries

Railfreight grey livery, shown on a Class 37 in September 1985.

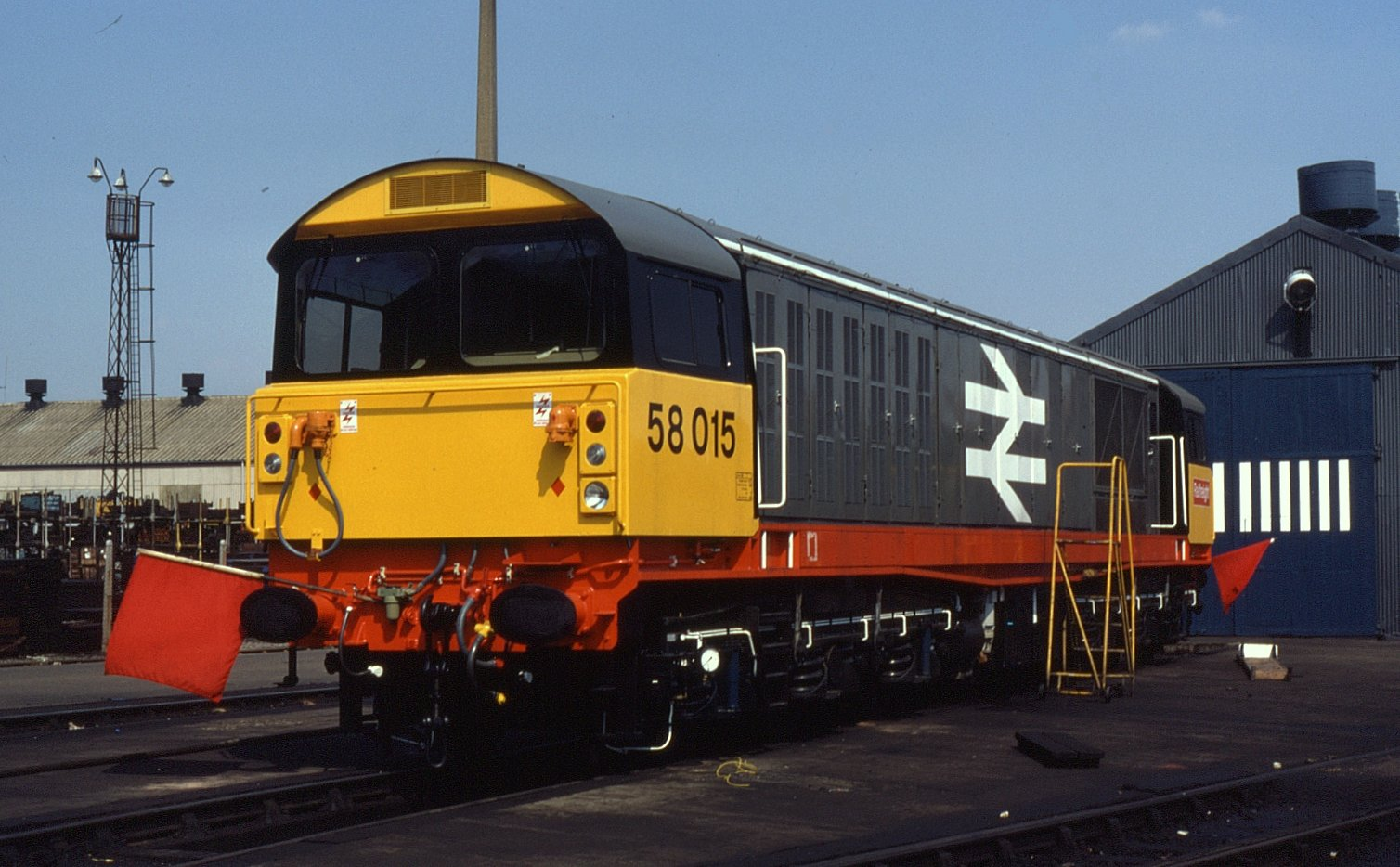
Railfreight Red Stripe livery, shown on a new Class 58 in August 1984.

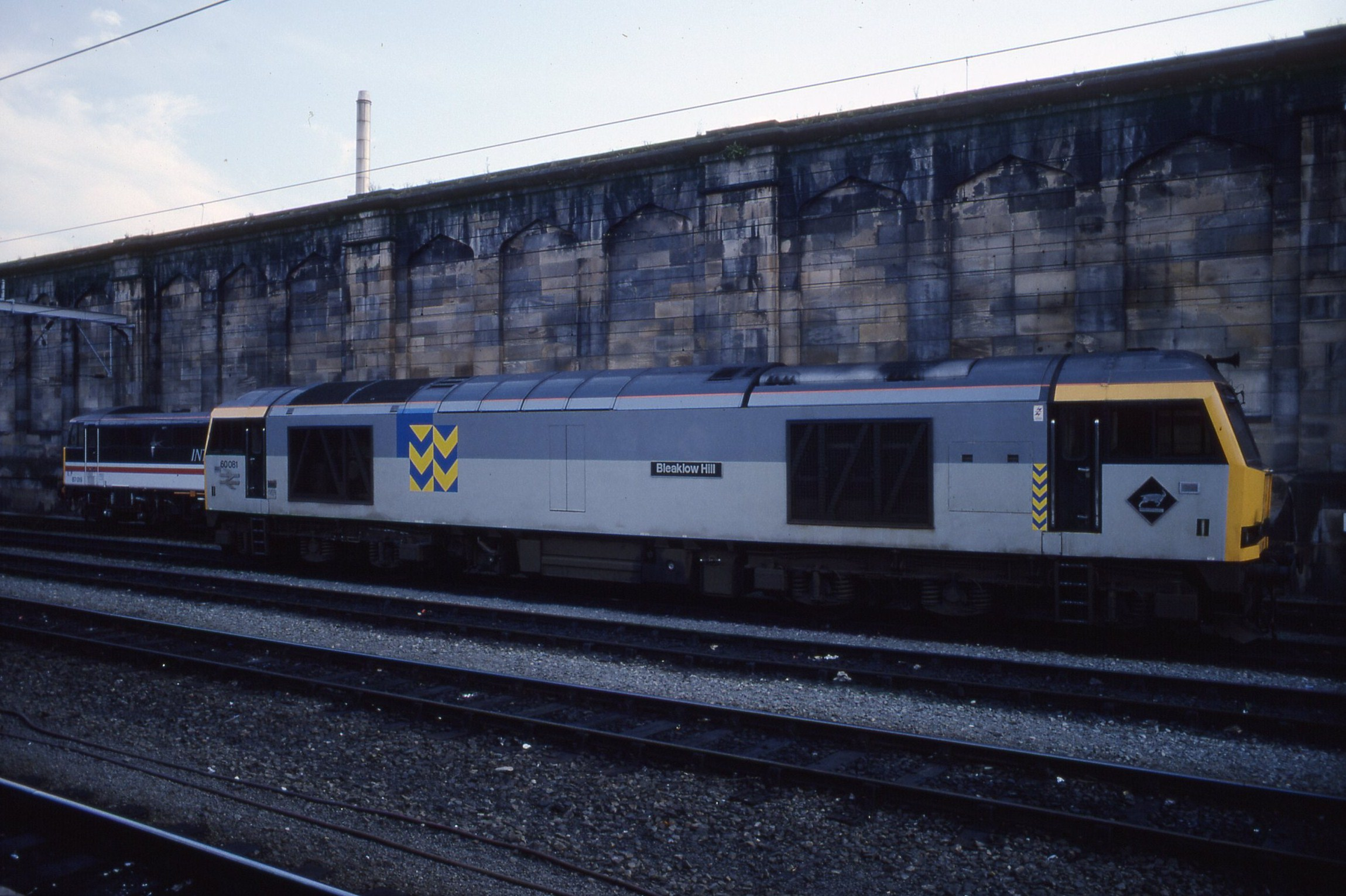
Railfreight Two-tone grey livery, on a Class 60 in September 1993.

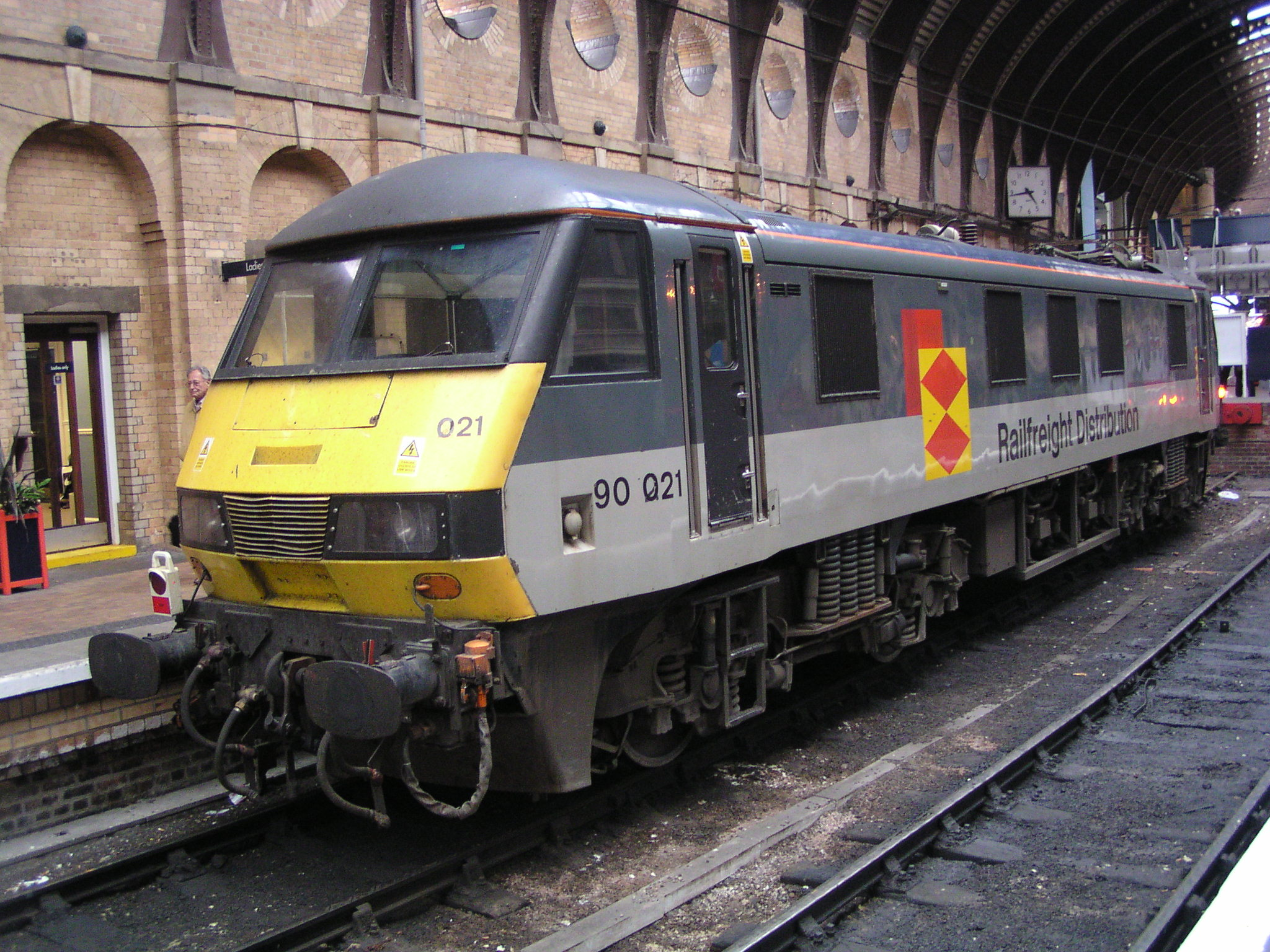
The modified Railfreight Two-tone grey livery used by Railfreight Distribution that appeared in the 1993, on 90021 at York on 3 June 2004.
