= Speedlink =

Wagonload freight service operated by British Rail

- Type: Subsidiary
- Industry: Rail
- Founded: 1977
- Defunct: 1991
- Headquarters: United Kingdom
- Services: Wagonload freight
- Parent: British Rail

Speedlink was a wagonload freight service that used air-braked wagons and was operated by British Rail from 1977 to 1991.

== History ==
=== Background ===
In the late 1960s British Rail (BR) was loss making and government supported. Management sought solutions and remedies to the problem of the declining wagonload business; in 1968 a Freight Plan committed the company to continuing wagonload traffic; the possibility of reducing the scope of the freight network was investigated, and computer modelling and computer route planning was introduced to seek increased efficiency. Additionally BR began operating a relatively high speed freight service (Bristol to Glasgow) using air braked wagons in 1972, (Note: The airbraked wagons could operate at up to 75mph, compared to 45mph for unbraked wagons.) a forerunner of the Speedlink service. Further air braked freight services were introduced in the early 1970s, and an investment in 650 wagons was sought.

During the 1970s, BR substantially reduced its rolling stock and infrastructure for wagonload traffic and total wagon numbers were reduced to 137,000 in 1979 from over 400,000 in 1968; from 1973 to 1979, a third of the system's marshalling yards were closed, and freight depots were reduced by nearly one fifth; in the same period total air braked wagons nearly doubled in number.

=== Speedlink ===
By 1977, the 1972 air-braked train service pilot had increased to 29 trains per day. The Speedlink service was formally launched in September 1977. (Note: A much more advanced proposal (1976) also named 'Speedlink' utilising "Freight multiple units", 20 major depots with automated sorting systems and 200 minor depots with gravity unloading system using roller conveyors was not funded.)

The Speedlink system was more restrictive than a traditional wagonload service utilising marshalling yards, but used fixed timetables between a more limited number of destinations — the resulting service was faster, with higher reliability on delivery times. In 1984, Speedlink was running 150 trunk services per day, with a peak 8 million tonnes carried per year, with two dozen main and secondary distribution sites with around 800 potential sidings as destinations — it was claimed (1983) that the service was profitable. (Note: This is believed to have been an accounting trick whereby Speedlink claimed an income based on charging other BR operating companies the full rate for transporting goods regardless of the actual income from the services.)

In 1988, the Speedlink service became part of a new BR operating sector, Railfreight Distribution (RfD) together with Freightliner, BR's intermodal container carrying rail freight subsidiary. The merger was hoped to bring in further business through business synergies between the two subsidiaries. Minor differences in the braking systems used by the two companies prevented train operating economies being realised.

The future of the company was under question throughout the 1980s; one reason for retaining the service was a potential increase in traffic after the opening of the Channel Tunnel. (Note: SNCF operated a large amount of wagonload traffic; additionally BR's contract to use the tunnel was a fixed annual charge, there was an understanding between SNCF and BR on cross channel freight, estimate to be over 5 million tonnes pa in 1995 after a 1993 opening.) Attempts to make Speedlink break even by 1992/3 were stymied by the early 1990s recession, as in 1989/90 the company lost £28 million, with revenue of £42 million; a review of operations had shown "trainload" freight to be profitable only on journeys of over 500 miles, with substantial loadings (10 wagons per day). The Conservative governments first elected in 1979, in power throughout the period (see Thatcher ministry and First Major ministry), sought improved financial performance of BR which was in contrast to the extensive public subsidy provided by earlier Labour governments.

Attempts to convert British Rail into a wholly commercially viable business prior to privatisation came to an end as The Speedlink service closed down in 1991. It had received state grants of £69 million during its existence, and at closure was carrying approximately 3 million tonnes of freight per year, at a loss of over £30 million pa on revenue of £45 million. After closure, approximately 70% of the freight carried was initially retained by BR, representing 125 trains per day; any freight viable as trainload services operated by the division were transferred to British Rail's regional trainload sectors Mainline Freight, Loadhaul, and Transrail Freight.

=== Successors ===
After the end of the Speedlink service in 1991, a number of services were initiated in attempts to serve the potential wagonload rail freight market:

Railfreight Distribution (RfD) established a wagonload service for cross-channel tunnel freight, named Connectrail; the operations of this business were incorporated into EWS after it acquired RfD in 1997, and merged it into its 'Enterprise' service.

A road-rail intermodal service Charterail was established in 1990 to serve potential customers post Speedlink using piggyback wagons from Tiphook. The company went into liquidation in 1992, claiming high locomotive haulage rates made the enterprise unsustainable.

In the BR privatisation transitional period (1994-1996), Transrail Freight started a long-distance service named 'Enterprise'; the service continued operations after the company became part of EWS as EWS Enterprise.

== Sources ==
- T.R. Gourvish (2011), British Railways 1948-73: A Business History, Cambridge University Press, ISBN 9780521264808
- T.R. Gourvish (2002), British rail, 1974-97: from integration to privatisation, Oxford University Press, ISBN 978-0-19-925005-9
