= Trainload Freight =

Sector of British Rail

- The four sectors of Trainload: Top row: "Coal", "Metals"; Bottom row: "Construction", "Petroleum".
- Company type: State owned
- Industry: Rail freight
- Founded: 1987
- Defunct: 1994
- Fate: split into regional sectors for privatisation
- Successor: 1994: Loadhaul, Mainline Freight, Transrail Freight 1996: English Welsh & Scottish
- Services: unit trains
- Parent: British Rail

Trainload Freight was the sector of British Rail responsible for trainload freight services. The division was subdivided into four sub-sectors; coal, petroleum, metals and construction.

It was formed in 1988 from the trainload operations of British Rail's Railfreight division. The company existed until 1994, when, as part of the privatisation process of British Rail, it was split into three separate companies by region: Load-Haul, Mainline Freight and Trans-Rail.

== History ==
Trainload Freight (TLF) was created in 1988 as the sector of British Rail responsible for operating unit trains. The division was subdivided into four sub-sectors according to cargo carried: Coal, Construction, Metals, and Petroleum. Other wagonload freight activities and containerised freight were organised in the Railfreight Distribution (RfD) division at the same time. The trainload business represented approximately 80% of British Rail's total revenue from freight, and 90% of freight traffic by mass. Trainload Freight was the only consistently profitable freight sector within British Rail.

In 1988, the company was authorised to acquire 100 Class 60 locomotives, at a cost of approximately £124 million.

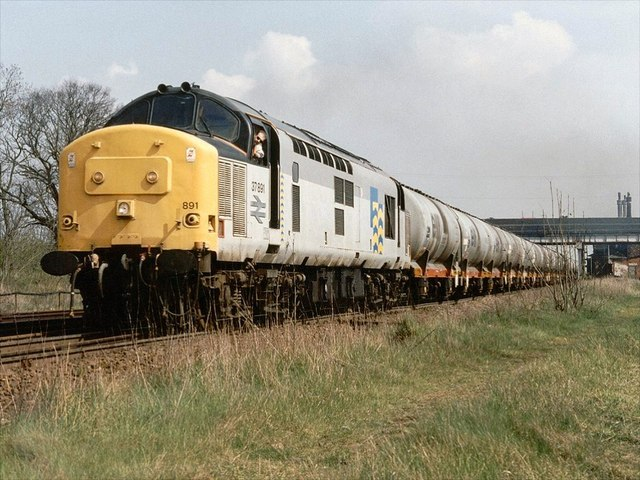
Class 37 hauled tanker train with petroleum sector decals near Immingham (1993)

In 1992 the company had revenue of around £500 million and made a profit of £67.5 million, exceeding government targets of a £50 million profit. Returns on capital assets were typically over 8% in the late 1980s prior to the early 1990s recession. British Rail was able to charge a 45% margin on basic costs in 1989 for coal transport prior to the privatisation of the electricity industry, after which less profitable contracts were negotiated.

From 1990 to 1994, the sector undertook further exercises to increase profitability; discriminatory pricing was employed. Approximately 10 million tonnes of unprofitable freight had been identified, of which 70% was retained under new working conditions and pricing arrangements; the remaining 3 million tonnes was lost, much of it being freight transport for the cement industry. Cost-cutting measures included a 20% reduction in employees, 50% reduction in locomotives, and 40% reduction in wagons, resulting in rail freight transport being reduced to under 100 million tonnes per annum in the lead-up to privatisation, a modal share of under 5%. Approximately 250,000 tonnes of coal was being transported per day by the company by 1993.

=== Shadow franchises and privatisation ===
After the Railways Act 1993, the trainload business was split into regionally based shadow franchises: Load-Haul, Mainline Freight and Trans-Rail. Trainload services offered by Railfreight Distribution were also merged into the regional businesses. All three trainload companies were acquired by North and South Railways, a company set up by a consortium led by Wisconsin Central, and became part of English Welsh & Scottish.

== Rolling stock ==
Class	Image	Number	Power
Class 20			Diesel Locomotive
Class 37			Diesel Locomotive
Class 47			Diesel Locomotive
Class 58		50	Diesel Locomotive
Class 60		100	Diesel Locomotive
Class 90		4	AC Electric Locomotive
