= Transrail (disambiguation) =

Transrail may refer to:

- Transrail, a Canadian consortium running Inter-city trains in Senegal and Mali
- Transrail Freight, a former freight division of British Rail

== See also ==
- Tranz Rail, a former rail operator in New Zealand
