= British Rail Class 09 =

Class of diesel-electric shunter locomotive

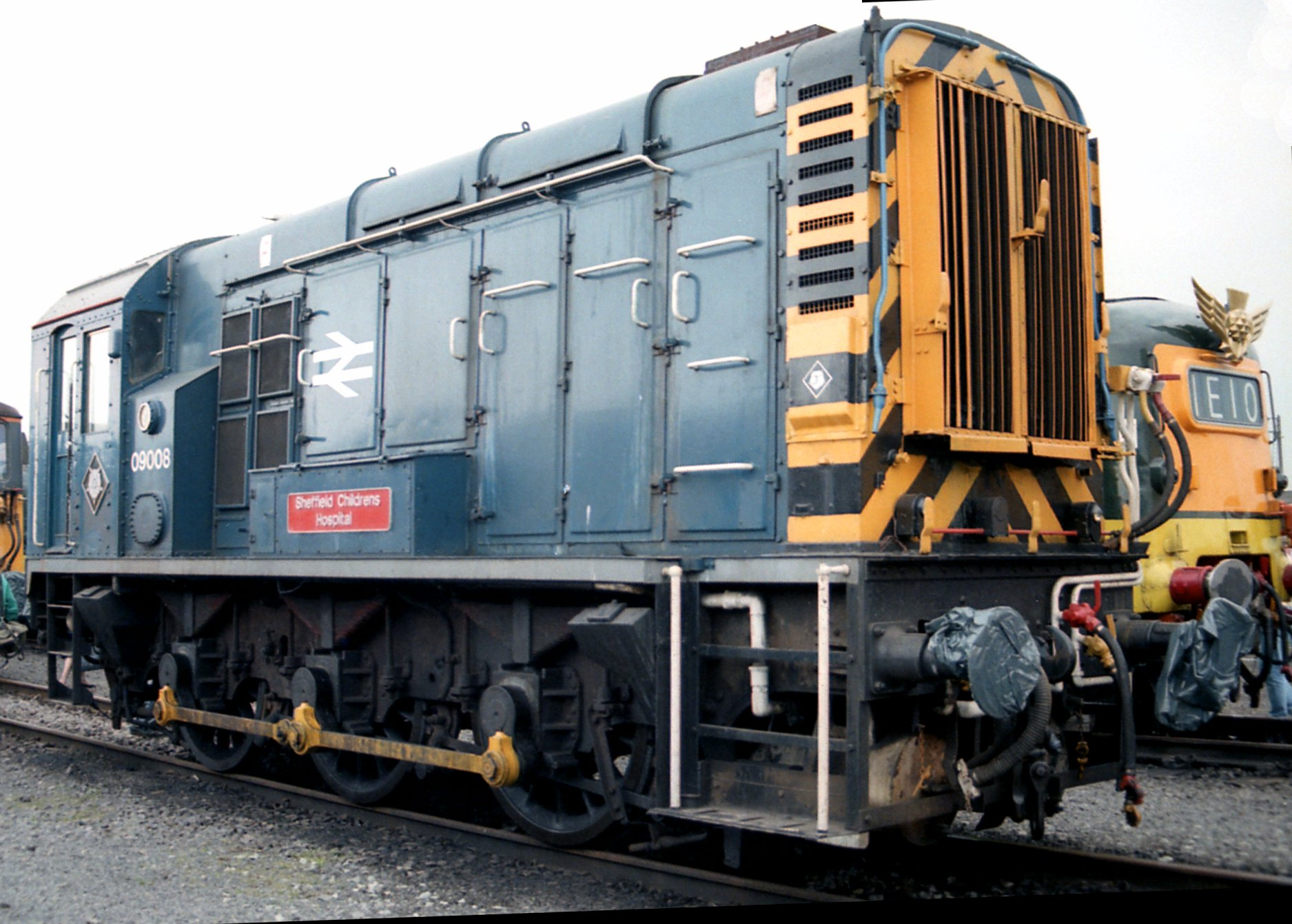
- 09008 at Coalville open day in 1991.
Type and origin
- Power type: Diesel-electric
- Builder: British Railways' Darlington Works, Horwich Works
- Build date: 1959, 1961–1962 (09/0)
- Total produced: 26 (09/0)
- Rebuild date: 1992–1993 (09/1, 09/2)
- Number rebuilt: 12 (7 09/1 + 5 09/2)
Specifications
- Configuration
  - Whyte: 0-6-0DE
  - UIC: C
- Gauge: 4 ft 8 1/2 in (1,435 mm) standard gauge
- Wheel diameter: 4 ft 6 in (1.372 m)
- Minimum curve: 3.5 chains (70.41 m)
- Wheelbase: 11 ft 6 in (3.505 m)
- Length: 29 ft 3 in (8.92 m)
- Width: 8 ft 6 in (2.591 m)
- Height: 12 ft 8 1/2 in (3.874 m)
- Loco weight: 49 long tons (49.8 t; 54.9 short tons)
- Fuel capacity: 668 imp gal (3,040 L; 802 US gal)
- Prime mover: English Electric 6KT
- Generator: DC English Electric 801
- Traction motors: 2 x English Electric 506
- Transmission: Diesel-electric, double reduction gearing
- Train heating: None
- Train brakes: originally Vacuum, later Dual, some now Air only
Performance figures
- Maximum speed: 27.5 mph (44.3 km/h)
- Power output: Engine: 350 hp (261 kW)
- Tractive effort: Maximum: 25,000 lbf (111.2 kN); Continuous: 8,800 lbf (39.1 kN)
- Brakeforce: 19 long tons-force (189 kN)
Career
- Operators: British Rail
- Number in class: 38
- Numbers: 09/0: D3665–D3671, D3719–D3721, D4099–D4114; later 09001–09026; 09/1: 09101-09107; 09/2: 09201-09205
- Nicknames: Gronk; Supergronk
- Axle load class: RA 5
- Withdrawn: 1981–present
- Disposition: 12 preserved, 25 still in service, 2 scrapped

The British Rail Class 09 is a class of 0-6-0 diesel locomotive designed primarily for shunting and short-distance freight trips along branch lines.

The 26 locos are nearly identical to the more numerous Class 08 shunting locomotives but have different gearing, giving a higher top speed of 27.5 mph (44 km/h) at the expense of a lower tractive effort. They were introduced from 1959 to 1962 and latterly operated in the Southern Region of British Railways, although some of the class were originally allocated to depots in the Midlands and North. Further locomotives were converted from Class 08 in 1992 and, following this and privatisation in 1997, the class has been distributed much further afield.

== Passenger operations ==
Although not normally considered for passenger work, Class 09s were recorded working passenger trains between Clapham Junction and Kensington Olympia when the booked Class 33 diesel was unavailable.

They were also used on railtours which needed to depart Brighton heading along the West Coastway Line or vice versa. To achieve this the 09 worked between Brighton and Preston Park, allowing the main tour locomotive to work the train forward via the Cliftonville tunnel and Hove. The connection to the West Coastway Line at Brighton can only be used by four car trains due to the arrangement of the points and track.

== Liveries ==
=== Post-Privatisation ===
The following liveries have been carried since the privatisation of British Rail:

- 09006/007/019/024 carried Mainline Freight livery
- 09008 in EWS livery
- 09025 in Connex livery
- 09204 in Arriva TrainCare livery
- 09201 in Railfreight grey and is currently in the Knottingley area working at EWS Depot

== Sub-classes ==
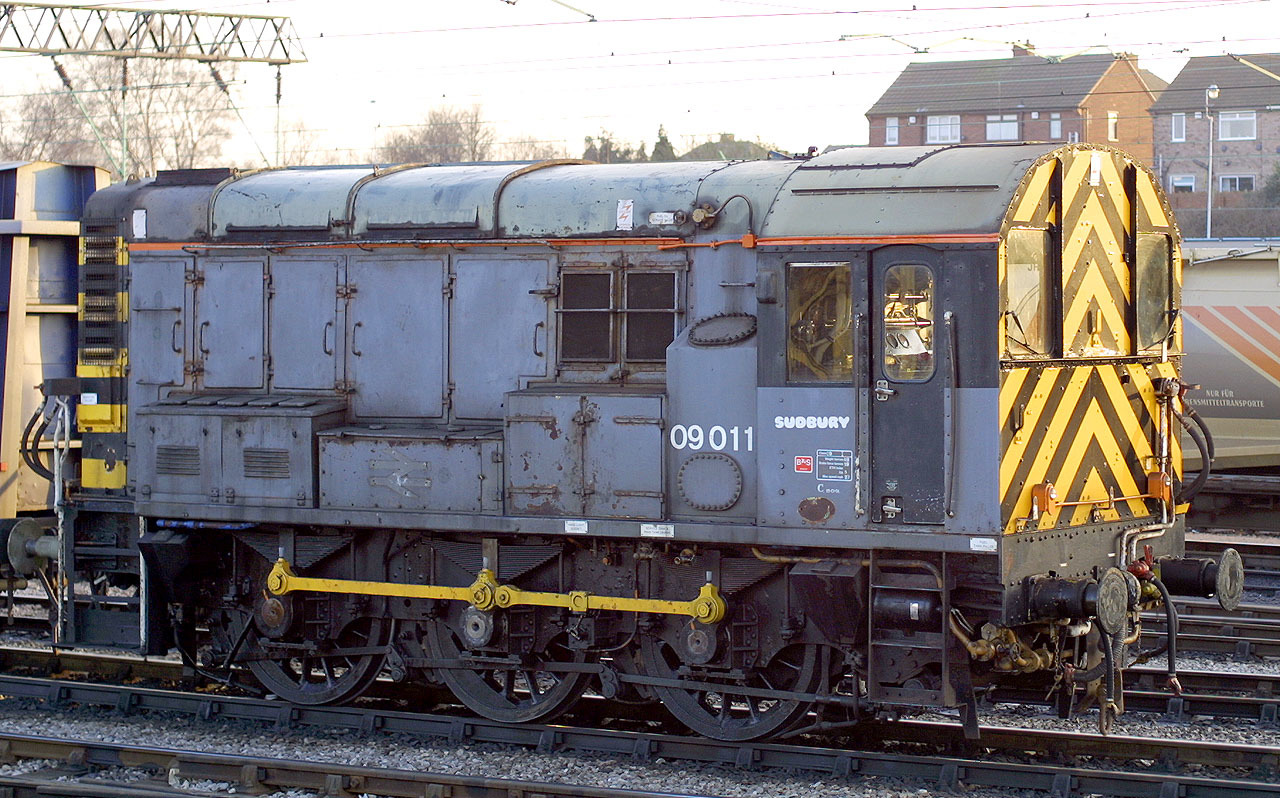
09011 at Bescot in 2001

The original 26 locomotives (built 1959–1962) became sub-class 09/0 when further locomotives were modified from Class 08s in 1992 which became subclasses Classes 09/1 and 09/2. There were variations, which were given the following TOPS design codes:

=== Class 09/0 ===
TOPS design code	Electrical system	Max speed	Weight	Brakes	Route availability	Notes
09-0AX	110 V	27.5 mph (44.3 km/h)	50.4 long tons (51.2 t; 56.4 short tons)	dual	?	Original design
09-0BA	110 V	27.5 mph (44.3 km/h)	51.0 long tons (51.8 t; 57.1 short tons)	air	6	knuckle couplings fitted (09003/11)

=== Classes 09/1 & 09/2 ===
TOPS design code	Electrical system	Max speed	Weight	Brakes	Route availability	Notes
09-1AX	110 V	27.5 mph (formerly 20 mph)	50.4 long tons (51.2 t; 56.4 short tons)	dual	?	
09-1BX	110 V	27.5 mph (formerly 15 mph)	50.4 long tons (51.2 t; 56.4 short tons)	dual	?	
09-1CX	110 V	27.5 mph (44.3 km/h)	49.0 long tons (49.8 t; 54.9 short tons)	dual	?	fitted with knuckle couplings
09-1EA	110 V	27.5 mph (44.3 km/h)	51.0 long tons (51.8 t; 57.1 short tons)	air	6	fitted with knuckle couplings
09-2AA	90 V	27.5 mph (44.3 km/h)	49.6 long tons (50.4 t; 55.6 short tons)	air	?	
09-2BX	90 V	27.5 mph (44.3 km/h)	50.5 long tons (51.3 t; 56.6 short tons)	dual	?	
09-2DA	90 V	27.5 mph (44.3 km/h)	51.0 long tons (51.8 t; 57.1 short tons)	air	6	fitted with knuckle couplings

== Preservation ==
12 members of the class have been preserved

- 09001 Ex DB Schenker at Peak Rail (Heritage Shunters Trust)
- D3668 (09004) at Avon Valley Railway
- D3721 (09010) at South Devon Railway
- D4100 (09012) Dick Hardy at Severn Valley Railway
- 09015 at Avon Valley Railway
- 09017 at National Railway Museum
- 09018 at Bluebell Railway
- 09019 at West Somerset Railway
- 09024 at East Lancashire Railway
- D4113 (09025) at Lavender Line
- 09026 Cedric Wares at Spa Valley Railway
- 09107 at Severn Valley Railway

== Model railways ==
Lima produced a range of Class 09s in OO gauge.

Hornby Railways and Bachmann have also produced 00 gauge models of Class 09 locomotives.

== References and sources ==
=== Sources ===
- Marsden, Colin J. (1981). Motive power recognition:1 Locomotives. Shepperton: Ian Allan Ltd. ISBN 0-7110-1109-5.
- Strickland, David C. (September 1983). Locomotive Directory: Every Single One There Has Ever Been. Camberley: Diesel and Electric Group. pp. 53–61. ISBN 978-0-906375-10-5. OCLC 16601890. OL 27959920M. Wikidata Q105978499.
