= Lake States Transportation Division =

Division of Soo Line Railroad (1986–1987)

The Lake States Transportation Division (LSTD) was a wholly owned division of the Soo Line Railroad that existed from 1986 until 1987. The bankruptcy of the Chicago, Milwaukee, St. Paul and Pacific Railroad (Milwaukee Road) saw Soo Line acquire its routes to add trackage between Chicago and the Twin Cities in 1985. The Interstate Commerce Commission (ICC) mandated that Soo Line must divest of some lines in the interest of preserving competition.

Soo Line created the LSTD on February 10, 1986 to operate the original Soo Line mainline from Forest Park, Illinois to Minneapolis via Withrow, Minnesota, as well as from Withrow to Sault Ste. Marie, Michigan, and branch lines from Argonne, Wisconsin to Neenah, Wisconsin and former Milwaukee Road branch lines from Green Bay to Milwaukee. The LSTD was around 2,000 miles (3,200 km) long.

The Canadian Pacific Railway's Soo Line subsidiary operated the LSTD with tri-weekly service on main lines and less frequently on branch lines. The entire LSTD was sold to newly formed Wisconsin Central Ltd. in 1987 for $133 million as per the ICC ruling. The WC was acquired by the Canadian National Railway in 2001 and the latter became the dominant operator of trains on its Chicago-Minneapolis mainline.
