= Fox River Valley Railroad =

Temporary railroad in Wisconsin, United States

Overview
- Headquarters: Green Bay, WI
- Reporting mark: FRVR
- Locale: Wisconsin
- Dates of operation: December 9, 1988–August 28, 1993
- Successor: Fox Valley and Western Ltd.

Technical
- Track gauge: 4 ft 8 1/2 in (1,435 mm) standard gauge

The Fox River Valley Railroad (reporting mark FRVR) was a short-lived railroad in eastern Wisconsin, US from 1988 to 1993 with about 214 miles of track, all of which was former Chicago and North Western Railway trackage. The line ran from Green Bay, Wisconsin, to the north side of Milwaukee. Owned by the Itel Rail Corporation, FRVR had problems from the start, plagued by big debt and little revenue. FRVR and sister railroad Green Bay and Western were eventually absorbed by the Wisconsin Central on August 28, 1993, as a subsidiary, Fox Valley and Western Ltd.

The railroad was known for its paint scheme and its extensive roster of former Chicago and North Western geeps.

The Fox River Valley Railroad actually began to take shape more than 100 years earlier when the Rock River Valley Union Railroad, a predecessor of the Chicago and North Western Railway (C&NW), reached Fond du Lac from Minnesota Junction in 1854. C&NW continued building north from Fond du Lac and reached Green Bay in 1862. Other lines followed, connecting Fond du Lac with Milwaukee, Milwaukee with Manitowoc, and Manitowoc with Green Bay by 1906.

All these lines operated as part of the C&NW system - until 1988 when C&NW sold most of them for $61 million to the newly formed Fox River Valley Railroad, a unit of Itel Rail Corporation.

Right from the start, FRVR struggled under the weight of heavy debt, continually suffering from cash flow problems. Itel tried to remedy the situation by placing it under common management with the Green Bay and Western Railroad in 1991. Then in 1993 Itel sold both properties to WCTC's new subsidiary, Fox Valley and Western Ltd.
