= Railfreight Distribution =

Sub-sector of British Rail

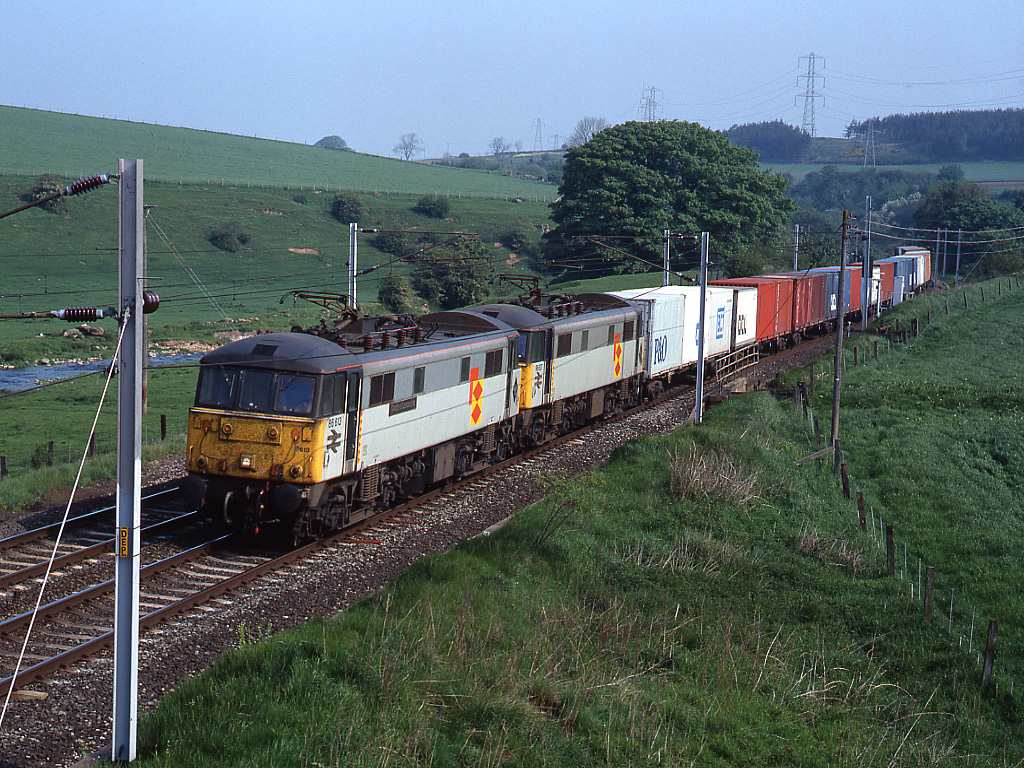
- Class 86s at Thrimby Bridge in 1992
- Type: State owned
- Industry: Rail freight
- Predecessor: Split off from Railfreight in 1988.
- Founded: 1987
- Defunct: 1995
- Fate: Split into regional sectors for privatisation
- Successor: 1995: Freightliner (Intermodal) 1996: English Welsh & Scottish (Wagonload)
- Services: Intermodal and Wagonload freight
- Parent: British Rail
- Divisions: Speedlink (Wagonload) and Freightliner (Intermodal)

Railfreight Distribution was a sub-sector of British Rail, created by the division in 1987 of British Rail's previous Railfreight sector. It was responsible for non-trainload freight operations, as well as Freightliner and Intermodal services. In its early years, the division was occasionally referred to as Speedlink Distribution. It was later responsible for freight operations through the Channel Tunnel.

== History ==
In the 1980s, freight traffic on the railway was in decline, due to a mixture of increased competition from road transport, a shrinking network that had reduced rail's reach and a decline in the domestic manufacturing industry, reducing internal demands for raw materials and transport of finished product for export. By the late 1980s, British Rail In October 1988, took three troublesome divisions of their freight operations; Speedlink (wagonload), Freightliner (Container), Railfreight International (International traffic) and merged them into one entity, Railfreight Distribution.

In 1991, following multiple years of losses, Speedlink was shut down. The losses were largely related to the costs involved with operations at marshalling yards and drop off and pick up of wagons at sidings amounted to 80% of total expenses. It was determined services only became economical if the wagons were moving over 500 miles (800 km), or in at least 10 wagon loads daily. However, approximately 70% of former Speedlink traffic was transitioned to more efficient trainload operations via trunk-haul or contracted train-loads. Railfreight Distribution turned its sights on the Channel Tunnel, which it would be responsible for conveying freight trains through, in cooperation with French train operator SNCF. Lessons learned from the elimination of wagonload operations created a push to emphasise and expand long-distance trips, such as Freightliner container traffic from ports in Felixstowe, Southampton, and London Thamesport. This push also would position Railfreight Distribution for an expected increase in freight traffic from Europe with the opening of the Channel Tunnel during the mid-1990s. However, this traffic would not materialize until after 2000.

== Division and sale ==
With the privatisation of British Rail, the intermodal business was split off in 1995 to form a separate company called Freightliner. In 1997, Railfreight Distribution was bought by English Welsh & Scottish.

== Locomotives ==
By the end, the fleet included several Class 47s, a group of Class 86s, a single Class 87 (87101), a fleet of Class 90s, and Class 92s, most of which were in store awaiting acceptance. Some of these were owned by European Passenger Services and SNCF and these were operated as a common user pool. The fleet was primarily based at Tinsley and Crewe Electric Depots at the time of privatisation, although many other depots were utilised during Railfreight Distribution's existence, mainly for shunting locomotives.

== Liveries ==
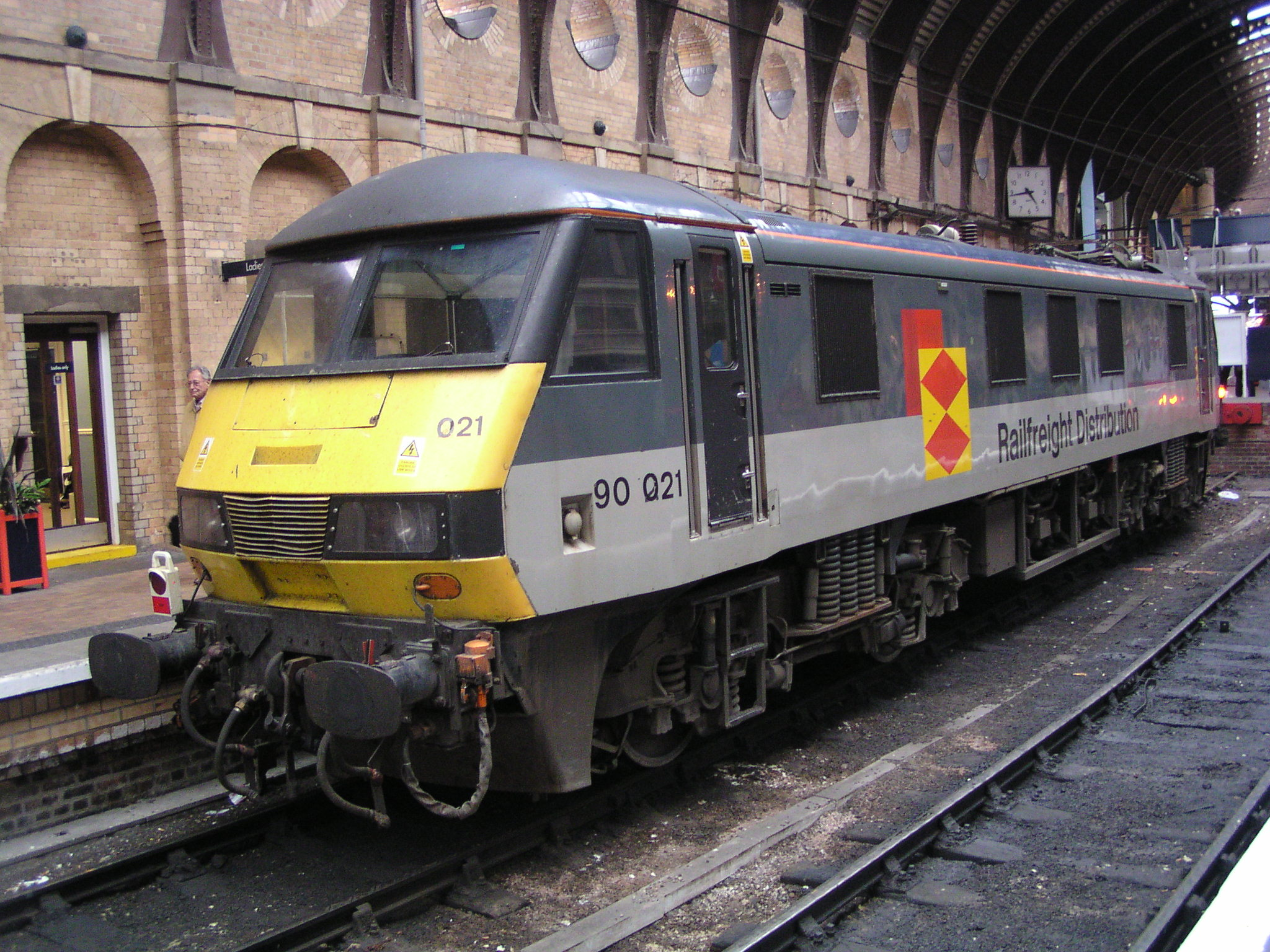
Revised Railfreight Distribution livery, as carried by 90021 at York on 3 June 2004.

In 1987, it introduced a new livery of two-tone grey similar to those adopted by the Trainload Freight and Railfreight General sub-sectors, with a logo consisting of two red diamonds on a yellow background offset on top of a red square. In 1992 in anticipation of the opening of the Channel Tunnel, the livery was revised to the 'European' version with a dark grey upper bodyside, a light grey lower bodyside, a blue coloured roof and 'Railfreight Distribution' lettering on the bodyside. Also in 1992, three Class 90/1s, (90128, 90129 and 90130), were given "continental" liveries of NMBS/SNCB blue, Deutsche Bahn red and SNCF grey to mark the Freightconnection Conference. Each loco was named "Freightconnection" in the livery's appropriate language. These three Class 90s were later reverted to their original 90/0 configuration
