= Weyauwega, Wisconsin, derailment =

1996 train accident in Wisconsin, U.S.

Coordinates: 44°19′47.5″N 88°55′59.6″W

Weyauwega derailment
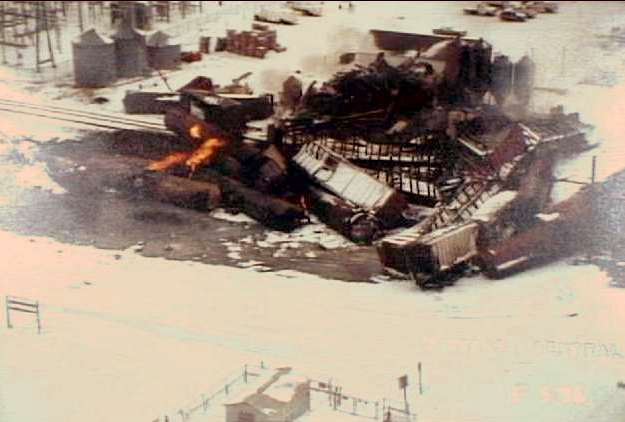
- Overhead view of the derailment site taken March 5, 1996

Details
- Date: March 4, 1996; 30 years ago 05:49 CST
- Location: Fremont, Wisconsin
- Country: United States
- Operator: Wisconsin Central Ltd.
- Service: L022-4
- Incident type: Derailment of a freight train
- Cause: Broken rail

Statistics
- Trains: 1
- Crew: 3
- Deaths: 0
- Injured: 0
- Damage: train cars and a feed mill destroyed by fire; 2,700 people evacuated for 16 days
- Weyauwega (Wisconsin)

The Weyauwega derailment was a railroad accident that occurred in Weyauwega, Wisconsin, United States, in the early morning hours of March 4, 1996. The derailed train was carrying a large quantity of hazardous material, which immediately caught fire. The fire, which involved the train cars and an adjacent feed mill, burned for more than two weeks after the actual derailment, resulting in the emergency evacuation of 2,300 people for 18 days, including the entire city of Weyauwega, with about 1,700 evacuees.

== Derailment and fire ==
At approximately 5:49 am, an 81-car Wisconsin Central freight train, identified as LO22-4, was traveling from Stevens Point, Wisconsin, to Oshkosh, Wisconsin, and approached the city of Weyauwega at 48.3 miles per hour (77.7 km/h), traveling on a downward grade. There were 2 locomotives at the head end of the train, with the leading locomotive identified as Wisconsin Central EMD SD45 6525, and the trailing locomotive identified as Wisconsin Central EMD GP40 3003. The locomotives and the first 16 cars of the train passed a switch without incident, after which the seventeenth through fifty-third cars behind them derailed at the location of the switch, at 5:49:32 AM. A subsequent NTSB investigation found the cause of the derailment to be a broken rail within the switch that was the result of an undetected bolt hole fracture. The derailed cars included seven tank cars of liquefied petroleum gas (LPG), seven tank cars of propane and two tank cars of sodium hydroxide. The derailment ruptured three of the tank cars, spilling both LPG and propane, which immediately ignited. The conductor of the train cut the train after the first nine cars, and proceeded onward 1.5 miles (2.4 km).

When the local fire crew arrived on the scene five minutes after the derailment, fireballs were exploding up to 300 feet (90 m) high, visible for nearly 13 miles (21 km). Fire spread to a nearby feed mill and storage building that were both difficult to access by the fire crew because the derailed train was blocking the Mill St. grade crossing. High-tension power lines were also torn down by the derailment, which caused secondary electrical fires. In total, seven of the tank cars of LPG and propane leaked, and the two sodium hydroxide tank cars leaked their contents. Electricity and natural gas service to 25% of the city of Weyauwega was disrupted, and city water services had to be shut off because of a rupture in a water main.

Jim Baehnman, the assistant fire chief (the commanding Fire Chief, Gary Hecker, was on vacation the day of the accident), quickly determined that the accident was beyond the scope of Weyauwega's fire department. Fire crews from 10 surrounding departments were called in to help with the recovery. Between 10 minutes and one hour after the derailment, it became known that propane and LPG were involved in this derailment.

One hour after the derailment, Wisconsin Central Railroad informed responding firefighters that the tank cars could withstand approximately 90 minutes of fire. Additionally, the head end of the train was rolled back to the accident scene, and pulled away seven cars of the train that were not derailed. At this point, a decision was made by the fire chief to pull firefighters back from the derailment, because of the risk of a BLEVE (boiling liquid expanding vapor explosion). This evacuation of personnel was two blocks for one hour, then 1 mile (1.6 km), and finally 1.5 miles (2.4 km); the initial evacuation was completed so quickly that fire hoses in use were abandoned and froze where they lay.

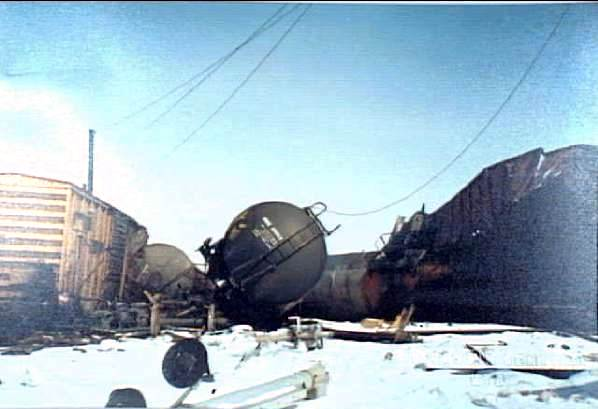
Derailed cars in the western section of the accident site

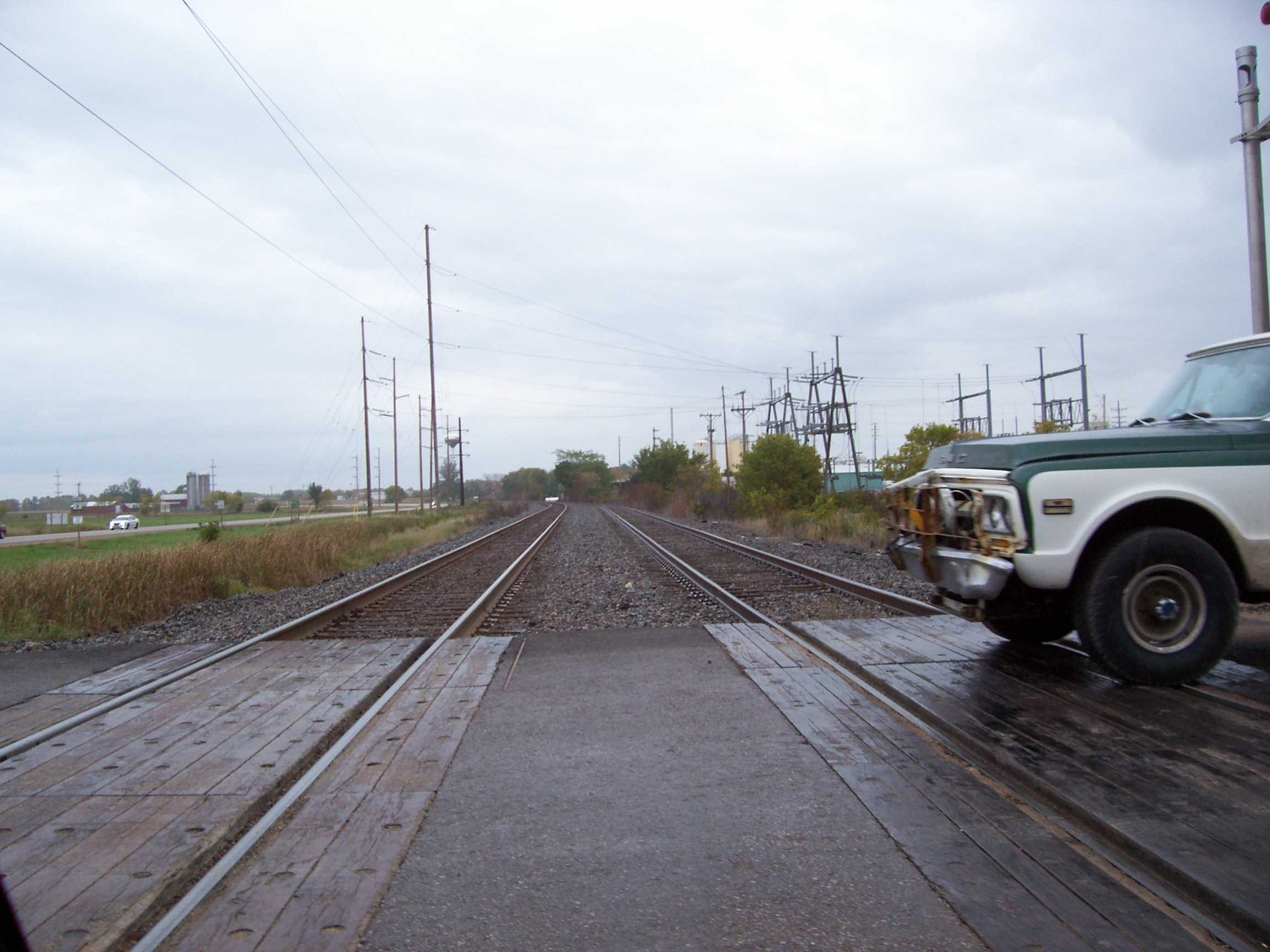
Looking east at the site of the derailment from Mill St in 2008.

Baehnman also decided to evacuate the entire city of Weyauwega, a decision which displaced approximately 1,700 residents of the city, and 600 additional people in surrounding rural areas. The scope of the resulting fire and leaking of chemicals kept residents evacuated for just over two weeks, and many of the fires that erupted as a result of the derailment burned for most of the 16-day evacuation.

The weather may have helped ease the situation for firefighters; the ambient temperature at the time of the derailment was only 10 °F (−12 °C) and there was still snow on the ground. Both factors may have helped prevent a BLEVE explosion within the first hour of the disaster, while emergency personnel were still on site. Ultimately, one of the cars containing LPG was involved in a BLEVE, causing a large fireball several hours after the accident. On March 20, officials in charge of the evacuation and disaster recovery declared the town safe for residents to return.

WC 6525 was eventually renumbered WC 7525. It is now owned by the Illinois Railway Museum and is on display there. It is occasionally used for special events hosted by the museum. WC 3003 pulled excursion trains for the National Railroad Museum to Kewaunee, WI, but eventually suffered from an electrical fire, and was retired and put out of service for good.

== Cause ==
Subsequent investigation and litigation established that the derailment was caused by an undetected, fractured heel block in a switch. The fracture then propagated through several bolt holes. A contributing factor was a lock bar that had been missing for approximately a year.

== Litigation and costs ==
Nine individuals who were affected by the evacuation filed a class action suit seeking punitive and treble damages against Wisconsin Central on March 26, 1996. By the end of the year, 13 additional families and two businesses joined the suit against the railroad, and another business filed a separate suit for damages in Waupaca County Circuit Court. Another company filed a separate suit in U.S. District Court for damages. Both of the separate suits were eventually dismissed. In 1998, the railroad estimated the costs from the derailment and class action suit to be valued at $28 million, of which Wisconsin Central had paid $27.2 million by the end of 1998.
