= Wisconsin Central Ltd. =

Transport company

Wisconsin Central Ltd

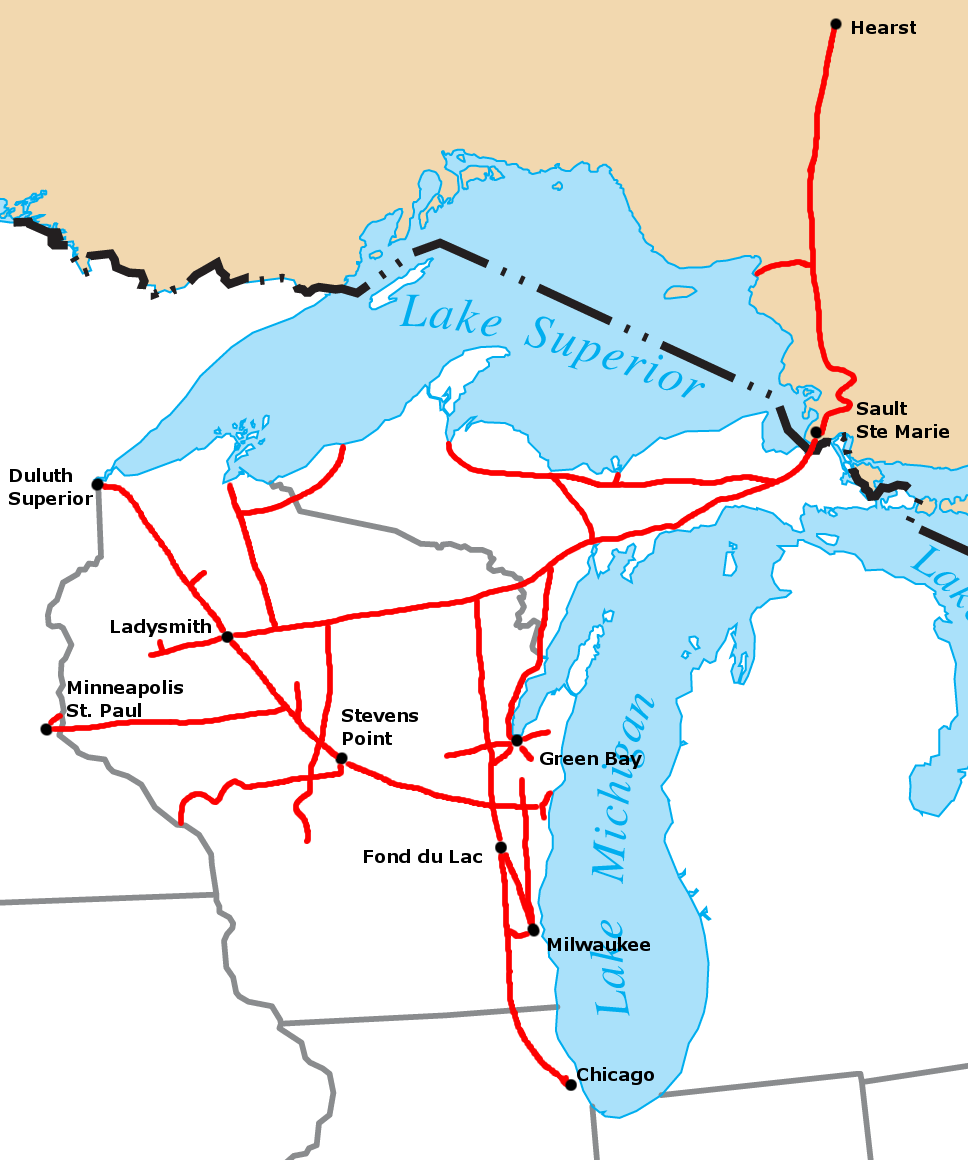
- System map of Wisconsin Central's trackage in 1998

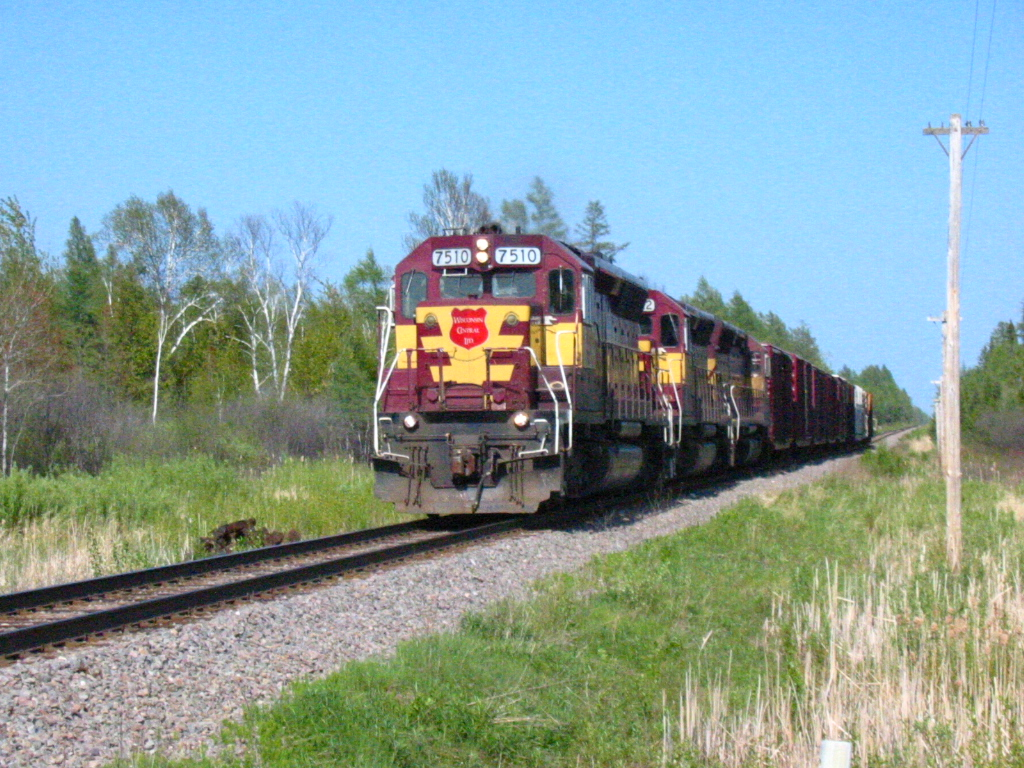
- A trio of Wisconsin Central EMD SD45s on Michigan's Upper Peninsula in 2003.

Overview
- Headquarters: North Fond du Lac, Wisconsin
- Reporting mark: WC
- Locale: Wisconsin, Upper Peninsula of Michigan, Illinois, Minnesota, Ontario
- Dates of operation: 1987–2001 (Standalone company) 2001-Present (As parent company CN subsidiary Wisconsin Central Ltd.)
- Successor: Canadian National Railway

Technical
- Track gauge: 4 ft 8 1/2 in (1,435 mm) standard gauge
- Length: 2,850 mi (4,590 km)

Wisconsin Central Ltd. (reporting mark WC) is a railroad subsidiary of Canadian National, operating in Wisconsin, Michigan, Illinois and Minnesota in the United States and Ontario in Canada. Its parent Wisconsin Central Transportation Corporation formerly owned or operated railroads in the United States, Canada (Algoma Central Railway), the United Kingdom (English Welsh & Scottish), New Zealand (Tranz Rail), and Australia (Australian Transport Network).

== Overview ==
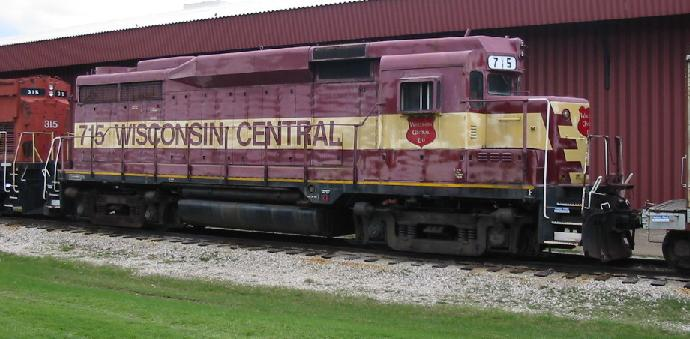
Wisconsin Central EMD GP30 on display at the National Railroad Museum in Ashwaubenon, Wisconsin

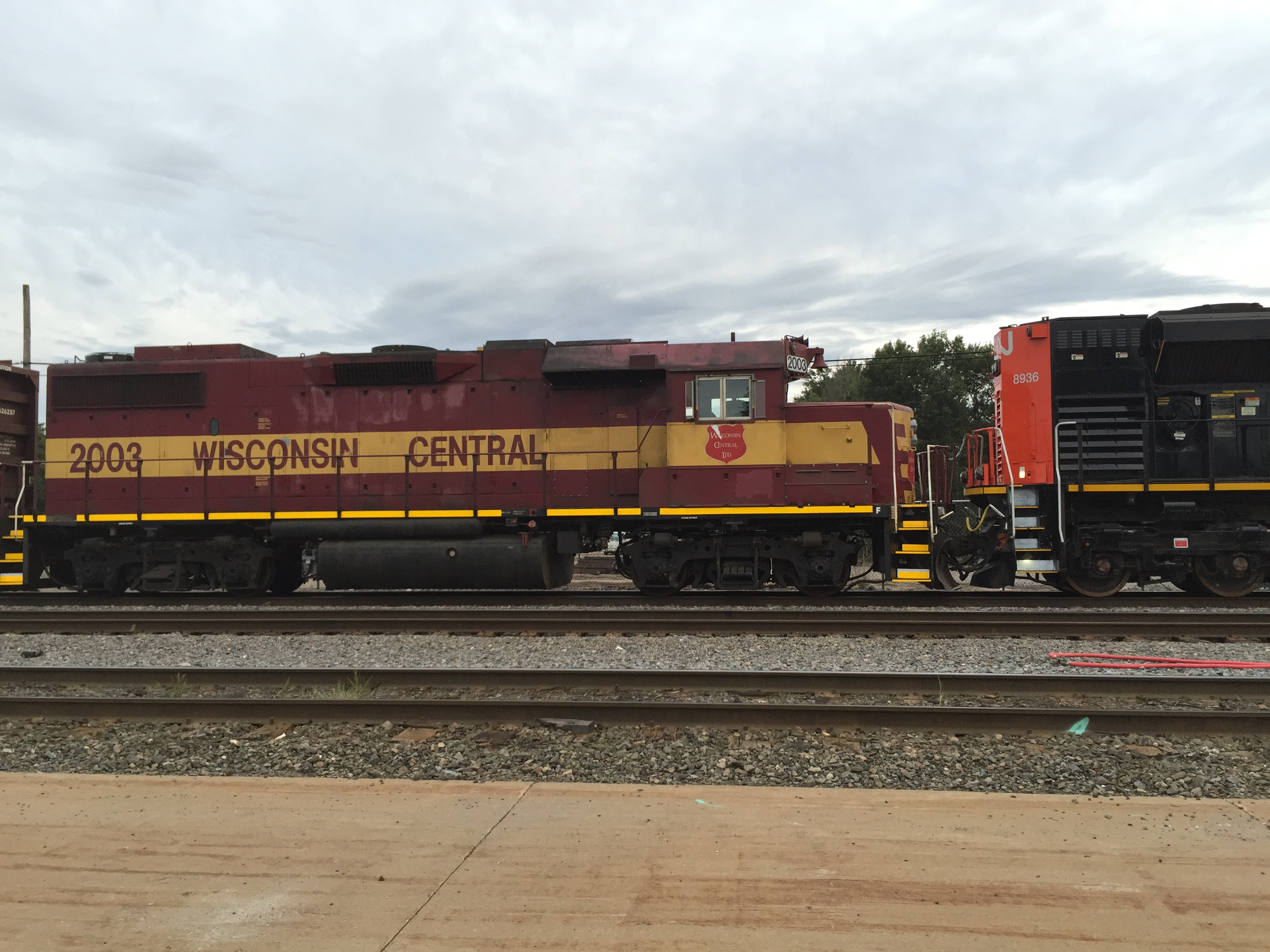
Wisconsin Central EMD GP38-2 at Stevens Point, Wisconsin in September 2015

Wisconsin Central Ltd. (WC) started in US in the mid-1980s using most of the original Wisconsin Central Railway's rights of way and some former Milwaukee Road rights of way after the Soo Line Railroad acquired the Wisconsin, Illinois, Indiana, Missouri and Minnesota holdings of the bankrupt Milwaukee Road and divested its older railway trackage in Wisconsin. In 1993 the Wisconsin Central also acquired the Green Bay and Western Railroad and the Fox River Valley Railroad.

In 1995, Wisconsin Central acquired the 322-mile (518 km) Canadian Algoma Central Railway whose tracks ran north of Sault Saint Marie to Hearst, Ontario. The Algoma Central runs a popular tourist passenger train through the Agawa Canyon and Agawa Canyon Wilderness Park near Lake Superior Provincial Park.

In 1996, Chicago commuter rail agency Metra inaugurated service on the WC's Waukesha Subdivision as the North Central Service.

In 2001, the Wisconsin Central was purchased by Canadian National. Along with the former Illinois Central Railroad, the former Wisconsin Central became part of Canadian National's United States holdings and its property integrated into the CN system.

At the time of its sale to Canadian National, Wisconsin Central operated over 2,850 miles (4,590 km) of track in the Great Lakes region. The railroad extended from Chicago into and through Wisconsin to Minneapolis-Saint Paul and Duluth, Minnesota, to Sault Ste Marie, Michigan, and north (through the Algoma Central Railway) to Hearst, Ontario.

In November 2020, as part of celebrations for the 25th anniversary of CN's privatization, the company unveiled a series of locomotives repainted in the schemes of its predecessor and/or subsidiary railroads. GE ET44AC No. 3069 was repainted in the burgundy and yellow livery of Wisconsin Central, along with the logos of that company.

== Timeline ==
- January 10, 1986: The Soo Line, nine days after purchasing the Milwaukee Road, creates the Lake States Transportation Division to operate its mainline between Forest Park, Illinois and Minneapolis, Minnesota.
- April 3, 1987: The Soo Line Railroad announces the sale of its Lake States Transportation Division to private investors, forming the new Wisconsin Central Transportation Corporation
- October 11, 1987: The first WC train runs, from Stevens Point to North Fond du Lac, Wisconsin
- May 1991: WC shares begin trading under the ticker symbol WCTC, raising $36.2 million
- 1992: Railway Age names Wisconsin Central the Regional Railroad of the Year
- 1993: WC acquires the Fox River Valley Railroad and Green Bay & Western railroads
- 1993: A Wisconsin Central-led consortium acquires New Zealand Rail through a new subsidiary, Wisconsin Central International, and renames it Tranz Rail in 1995
- 1995: WC acquires the Algoma Central Railway through a new subsidiary, Wisconsin Central Canada Holdings
- 1995: A WC-led consortium acquires Rail Express Systems in the United Kingdom from the British Railways Board
- 1996: WC partners with Canadian National (CN) and CSX, inaugurating a new intermodal shipping corridor between the west and east coasts of North America
- 1996: The Loadhaul, Mainline Freight and Transrail Freight freight operators in the UK are purchased from the British Railways Board and merged as English Welsh & Scottish (EWS)
- March 4, 1996: A Wisconsin Central freight train derails in Weyauwega, Wisconsin; the derailment results in a 16-day evacuation
- August 19, 1996: Metra, a commuter railroad agency based in Chicago, inaugurates its North Central Service route on the WC's Waukesha Subdivision.
- 1997: EWS acquires Railfreight Distribution in the UK from the British Railways Board and merges it into EWS
- 1997: Another WC subsidiary, the Sault Ste. Marie Bridge Company, acquires 207 miles (333 km) of track from Union Pacific Railroad forming a WC connection between Green Bay, Wisconsin, and Ishpeming, Michigan
- 1997: Australian Transport Network (ATN), in which Wisconsin Central owned a one-third stake, purchased Tasrail in Tasmania, six months later ATN acquired the Emu Bay Railway in Tasmania
- 1999: Railway Age names Wisconsin Central president Edward Burkhardt its Railroader of the Year
- January 30, 2001: Wisconsin Central and Canadian National announce plans for CN to purchase the former for $800 million and the assumption of $400 million of WC's debt, it is completed on October 9, 2001
- June 28, 2007: Deutsche Bahn announced it had agreed with CN/WC to purchase EWS, subject to receiving regulatory approval, in exchange for £309 million. At the time of the acquisition, EWS had a market share of around 70% in the United Kingdom rail freight sector and had around 5,000 employees. After the transaction was approved by the European Commissioner for Competition, the transaction was completed on 13 November 2007.
- December 21, 2011: Duluth, Winnipeg & Pacific Railway and Duluth, Missabe & Iron Range Railway, also owned by CN, are merged into Wisconsin Central
- January 1, 2013: Elgin, Joliet and Eastern Railway is merged into Wisconsin Central Ltd indirectly as parent company CN made the acquisition
