= Wagonload freight =

Trains made of single wagon consignments of freight

In rail freight transportation the terms wagonload or wagonload freight refer to trains made of single wagon consignments of freight. In the US and Canada the term carload refers to a single car of any kind, and manifest train refers to trains made of diverse cars of freight.

With competition from road transport rail freight transport is increasingly operated as unit trains, with wagonload less able to compete with road haulage.

As of 2012 in Europe wagonload freight represents 30 to 40 percent of freight carried in many countries including France, Italy, Germany, Belgium; in other countries, including the UK and Romania, wagonload freight is a very minor aspect of rail freight transport representing less than 5% of rail freight transport.

== Overview ==
Wagonload traffic typically consists of individual wagons load with goods at separate locations (goods shed), transferred to marshalling yards where the wagons are sorted by destination, then transported to a destination marshalling yard where individual wagons are separated and collected into trains per destination.

== By country ==
=== Europe ===
Wagonload is a diminishing sector of rail freight transport in the EU; the percentage of rail freight transported as wagonload diminished from 45% to 35% from the late 1980s to 90s. The relative extent of wagon load traffic within the Europe varies considerably; in the 1990s within the EU an EFTA wagonload traffic accounted for approximately 40% of rail freight, whilst in eastern European countries the percentage was higher, around 60%.

==== France ====
In France wagonload freight (French: wagon isolé), though unprofitable continued to be operated by SNCF (2010), wagonload freight was responsible for a significant operating losses in the SNCF group in the first decade of the 21st century, with low productivity levels, including freight terminals that were inactive over periods of months. As a result, SNCF began to seek solutions for the profitability options, including considering the use of US style "shortline" operators on branch networks. In 2009 approximately 50% of SNCF's railfreight was wagonload. A 'multi-lots, multi-clients' contracting system was introduced in 2010 in an attempt to move towards more profitable freight work, and cut on demand wagonload services on lightly utilised routes.

==== Germany ====
In Germany wagonload traffic decreased by 10% from 1994 to 2010, but still represented 30% of railfreight in Germany.

==== UK ====
In the United Kingdom the wagonload system was reduced by the consequences of the implementation of The Reshaping of British Railways report. Cuts to the system included the closure of marshalling yards (reduced by over one third by 1965), and 60% of freight stations – though the initial cuts had no effect on volume of freight carried. Wagonload freight was still loss making in 1965 despite the closures – making a loss of £40 million (from a £54million loss in 1961). No improvement in profitability had been achieved by 1966, despite the economies, and in part exacerbated by the cuts.

In 1967 wagonload freight produced two thirds of British Rail's freight revenue. Further reductions of the systems were made, 4,000 miles of line were closed between 1965 and 1973. By 1972 the number of marshalling yards had been reduced to 124 from over 600 a decade earlier. These cuts had a limited effect of freight traffic, reducing freight by only 13%. Introduction of unit train type merry-go-round services and Freightliner intermodal services introduced from the 1960s onwards also shifted rail freight transport away from the wagonload workings, but could not total replace it; the economic future of wagonload services remained uncertain in the 1970s, despite the introduction of a new airbraked higher speed service named Speedlink (trialled in 1972, formally introduced in 1977). In 1976 wagonload freight was still making a loss of £30 million pa. The loss making Speedlink operations ceased in 1991. In 1992 wagonload traffic carried by BR in the UK was 15.2million tonnes, approximately 10% of freight traffic. Some residual wagonload operations including international freight work continued to be operated by Railfreight Distribution (RfD), in particular as part of its Connectrail service; RfD was also unprofitable, and when privatised in 1997 the acquirer, EWS received significant subsidies (over £200 million over 8 years). Minor wagonload services were operated in the post privatisation period, including EWS's 'Enterprise' service, which carried 3 million tonnes of freight in 1999.

==== Other ====
As of 2010 wagonload freight is a significant part of the rail freight transport business in Switzerland (38%), Italy (35%), Poland (34%) and Spain (30%) (by tonne-km). In Romania (2010) single wagonload traffic represents less than 10% of the rail freight transportation.

=== North America ===
In the US and Canada the term manifest train refers to trains made of diverse cars of freight, moving from rail hubs to rail hubs to save costs and gain in efficiency.

As of 2000, in the USA Class 1 railroads act as trunk route operators, whilst 'Short line' operators act as branch and feeders to the trunk lines - the short line operators have lower operating costs.

== See also ==
- Demurrage
- Interchange
- Less than carload
