= Unit train =

Train

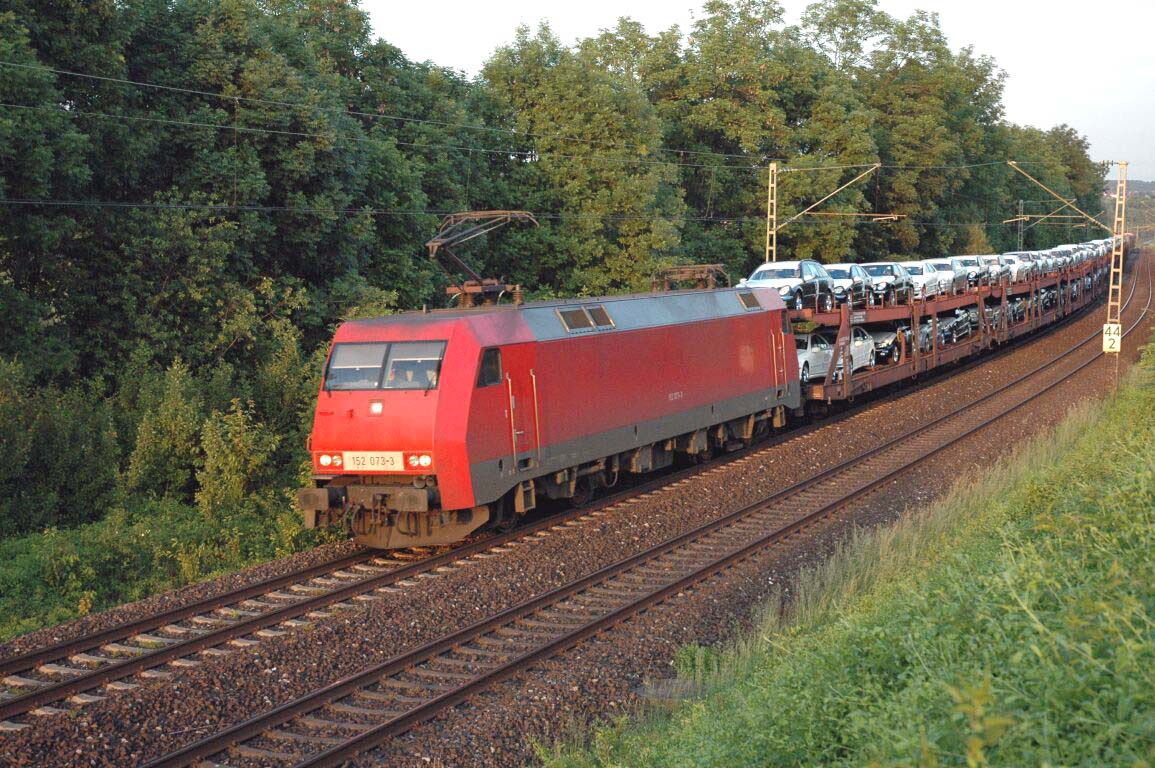
A Deutsche Bahn unit train working for Daimler AG between the factories at Sindelfingen and Bremen

A unit train, also called a block train or a trainload service, is a train in which all cars (wagons) carry the same commodity and are shipped from the same origin to the same destination, without being split up or stored en route. They are distinct from wagonload trains, composed of differing numbers of cars for various customers.

Unit trains enable railways to compete more effectively with road and internal waterway transport systems. Time and money are saved by avoiding the complexities and delays that would otherwise involve assembling and disassembling trains at rail yards near the origin and destination.

Unit trains are particularly efficient and economical for high-volume commodities. The use of unit trains allows for more efficient use of train cars, especially when facilities exist for rapid loading and unloading. This leads to cost savings for both train operators and shippers. Since they often carry only one commodity, cars are of all the same type; often identical. Some commodities (e.g., coal) can be loaded at the origin while the train moves slowly on a loop track. The procedure is reversed at the receiving end, and because there generally is not any commodity to be hauled in the opposite direction, the train returns empty. In the United States the Santa Fe is credited with operating the first true unit train, hauling coal from a mine near Raton, New Mexico to a steel mill at Fontana, California.

== Use ==
Unit trains are typically used for the transportation of bulk goods. These can be solid substances such as:

- Aggregate
- Coal from mines to power stations
- Coke from coking plants to steel mills
- Iron ore from mines to ports or steel mills
- Ore
- Phosphate from mines to fertilizer plants
- Potash
- Sand (e.g., for hydraulic fracturing)
- Steel
- Taconite
- Track ballast or gravel

Bulk liquids are transported in unit trains made up of tank cars, such as:

- Crude oil from oil fields to refineries (can be [60,000 barrels (9,500 m^{3})] of oil in a unit train of 100 tank cars)
- Ethanol from ethanol plants to motor fuel blending facilities
- Molten sulfur (non-US:sulphur)

Food, such as:

- Fruit juice
- Corn
- Mineral oil products from the refineries to the storage facilities
- Refrigerated food
- Wheat

Other examples include:

- Automobiles in autoracks
- Intermodal containers, generally between a port and a truck depot
- Mail
- Military Equipment (weapons)
- TOFC (Trailer on flat car)
- Waste (garbage), usually for recycling, often metals or paper

== Benefits ==
The use of unit trains allows for improved utilization of equipment and less dwell time compared to the traditional method of routing individual cars to and from destinations. The Potash Corporation of Saskatchewan projected the use of unit trains reduced turnaround time (one full cycle from origin to destination and back) from 40 days to 15 days when implemented in 1980, along with a decrease in expenses. The company was also able to achieve a lower shipping rate per car from railroads when using unit trains.

== See also ==
- Drag freight, a type of unit train.
- Coke Express
- Merry-go-round train
- Railex
- Tropicana's Juice Train
