= Mainline Freight =

British rail freight operator

Mainline Freight Ltd

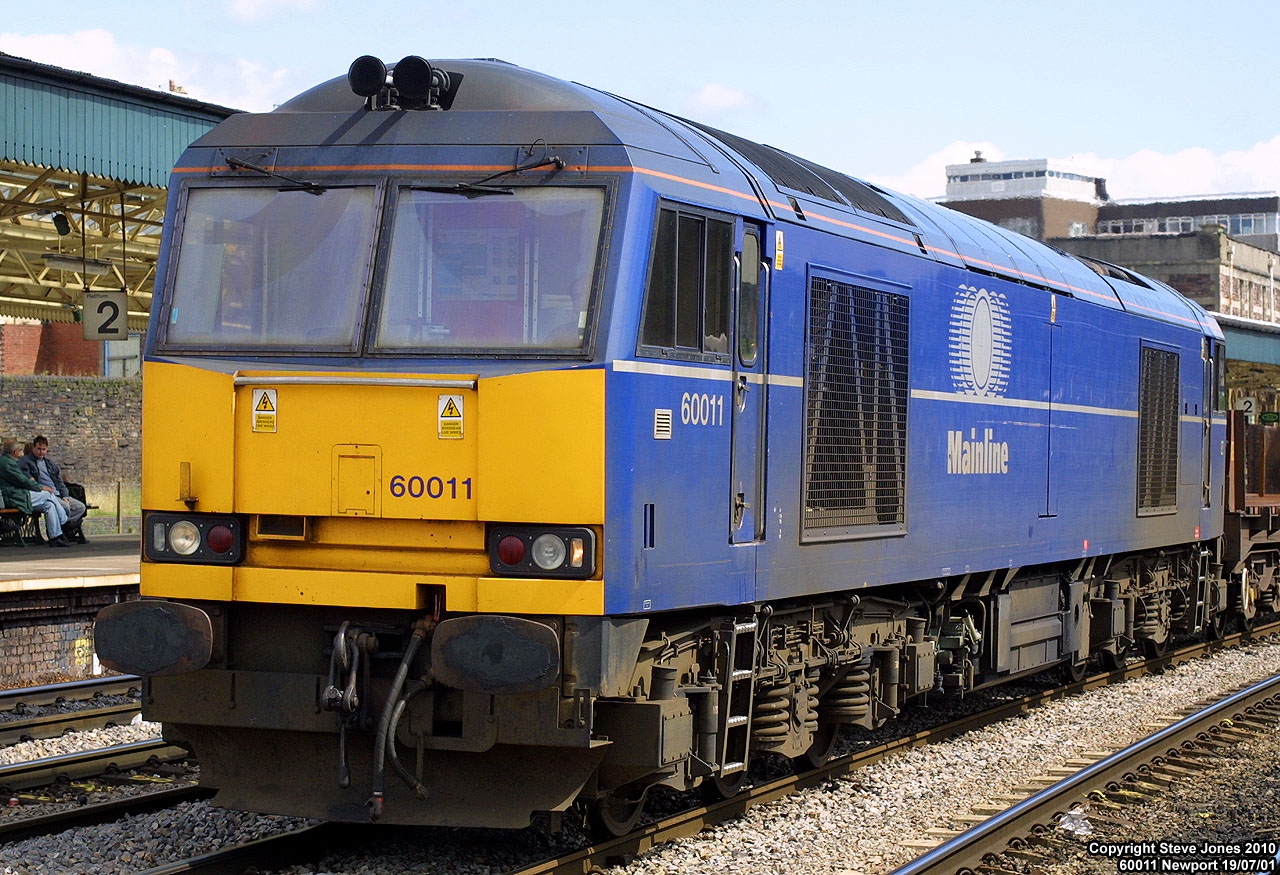
- 60011 at Newport on 19th July 2001
- Industry: Rail freight
- Founded: 9 June 1994 as Trainload Freight South East
- Defunct: 1996
- Fate: Acquired by Wisconsin Central Ltd.
- Successor: English Welsh & Scottish
- Headquarters: Islington, United Kingdom
- Services: Freight train owner/operator
- Parent: British Rail

Mainline Freight was a trainload rail freight operator based in Islington, London, England with operations extending to Yorkshire in the north and Somerset in the west. It was formed from part of British Rail's Trainload Freight division as part of the privatisation of British Rail.

Mainline Freight, Loadhaul and Transrail were purchased by a consortium led by Wisconsin Central in 1996 and amalgamated into a new company, English Welsh & Scottish.

== History ==
Mainline Freight was created in 1994 along with Transrail and Loadhaul as part of the broadly regional split of British Rail's Trainload Freight operations – Mainline Freight's centre of operations were South East England, and East Anglia, and the East Midlands. Three companies were created with the aim of promoting competition between the businesses. It was initially and briefly named "Trainload Freight South East Limited" before being re-branded in September 1994.

All three former Trainload Freight companies including Mainline Freight were acquired in February 1996 by 'North-South Railways': a company formed by a consortium led by US railroad company Wisconsin Central, for a combined total of £225.15million (approximately $349 million). The management of Mainline Freight, backed by Candover and Associated British Ports also formed a bidding consortium for the three former Trainload Freight companies. The three companies together with Rail Express Systems were formed into a new company, English Welsh & Scottish (EWS).

== Fleet ==
Mainline Freight's fleet consisted of Class 08, Class 09, Class 31, Class 33, Class 37, Class 47, Class 58, Class 60 and Class 73 locomotives based at Toton, Stratford, Hither Green, Stewarts Lane and Eastleigh depots

=== Livery ===
The company introduced a livery of 'aircraft blue' with a silver bodyside stripe, and "rolling wheels" logo with Mainline branding. Some locomotives (particularly the classes 33, 37, 58 and 60) retained the Trainload Freight two-tone grey livery but with the addition of the Mainline Freight logo.

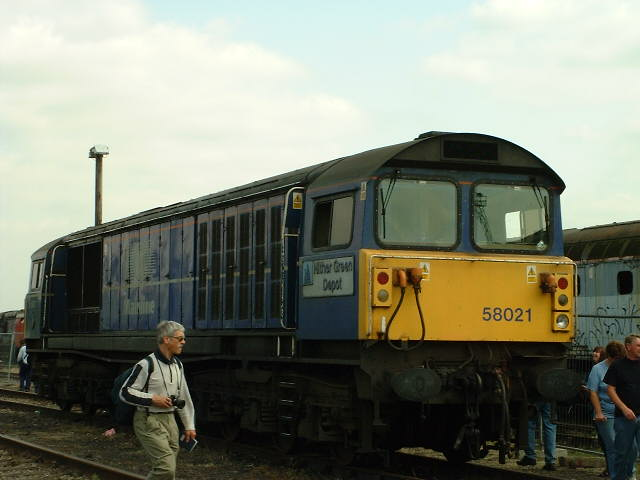
Mainline Freight Class 58 in

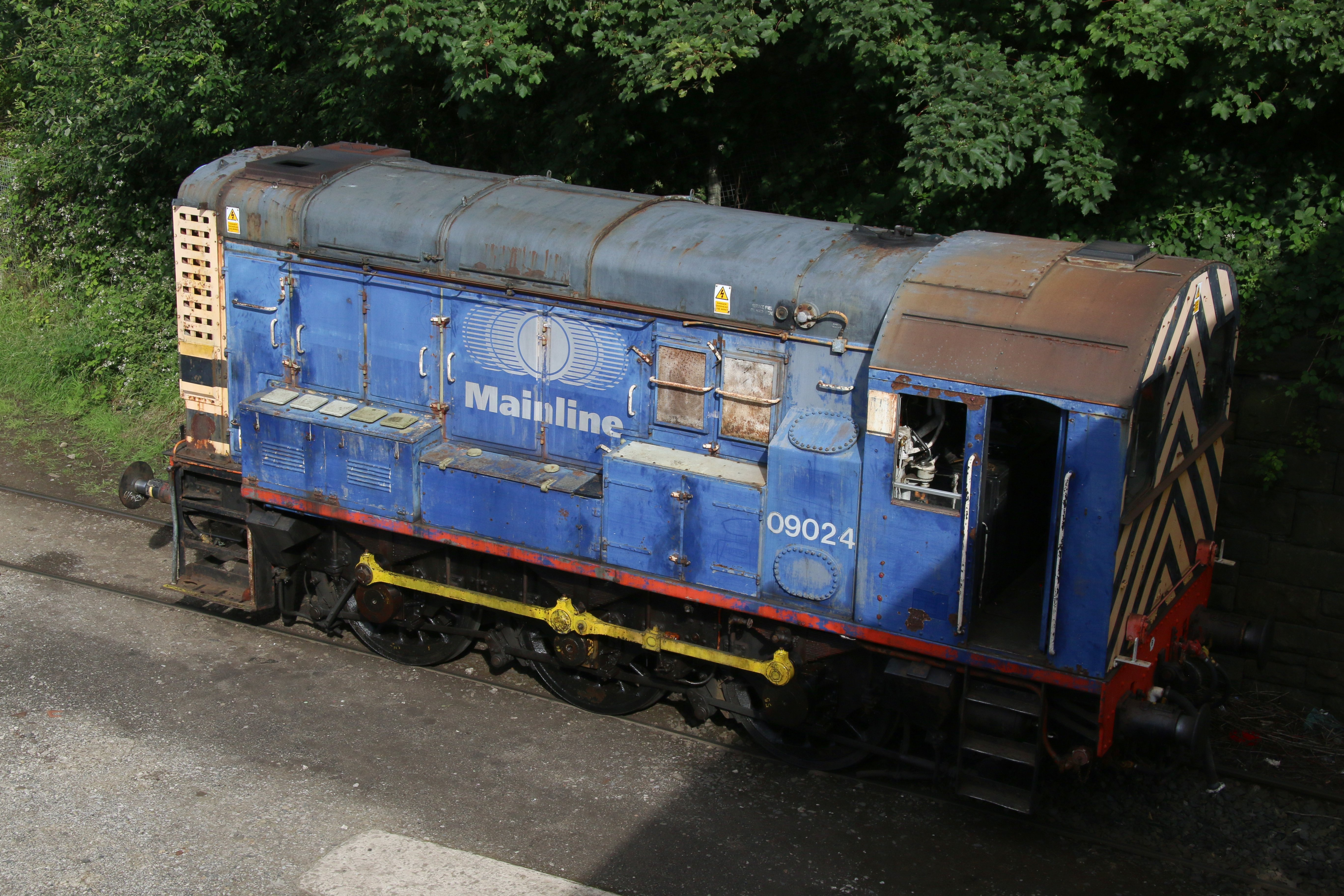
Mainline Freight Class 08

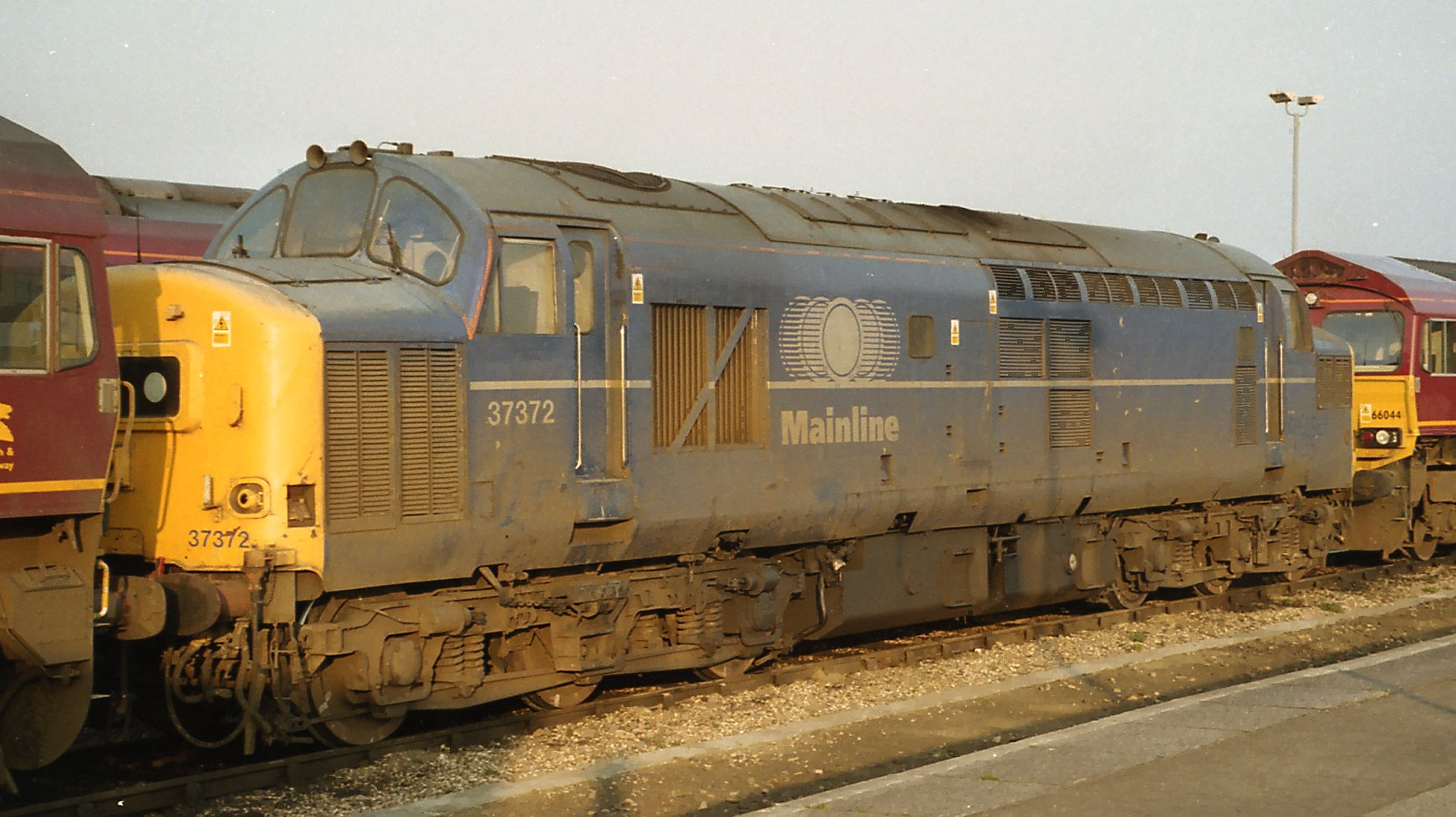
Mainline Freight Class 37

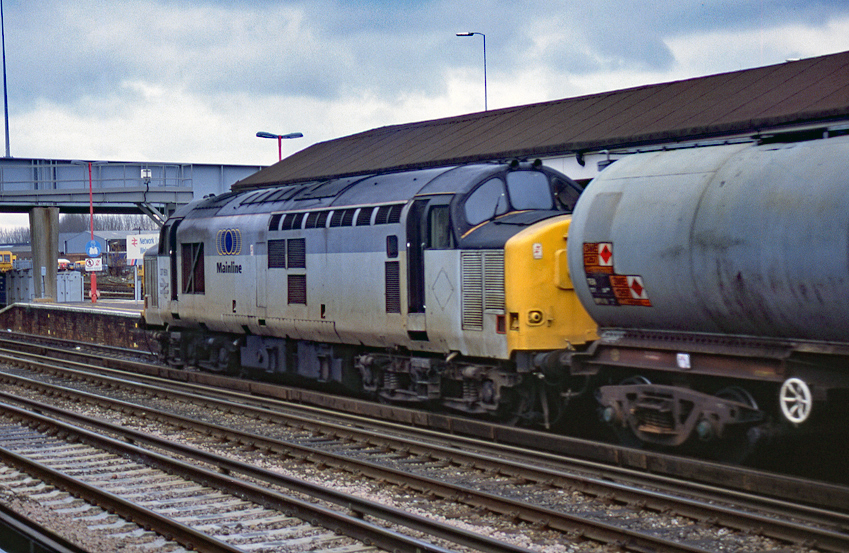
37891 in Railfeight grey with Mainline branding

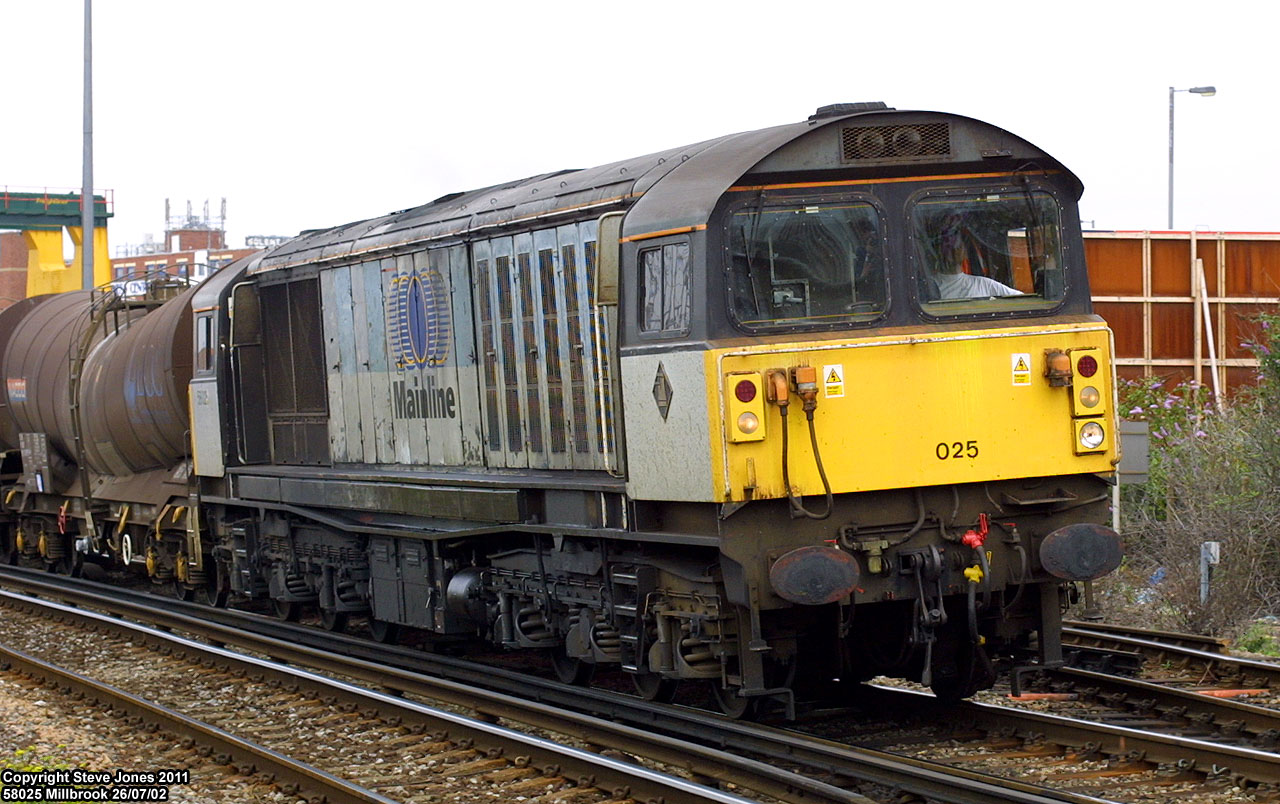
Class 58 in 2002

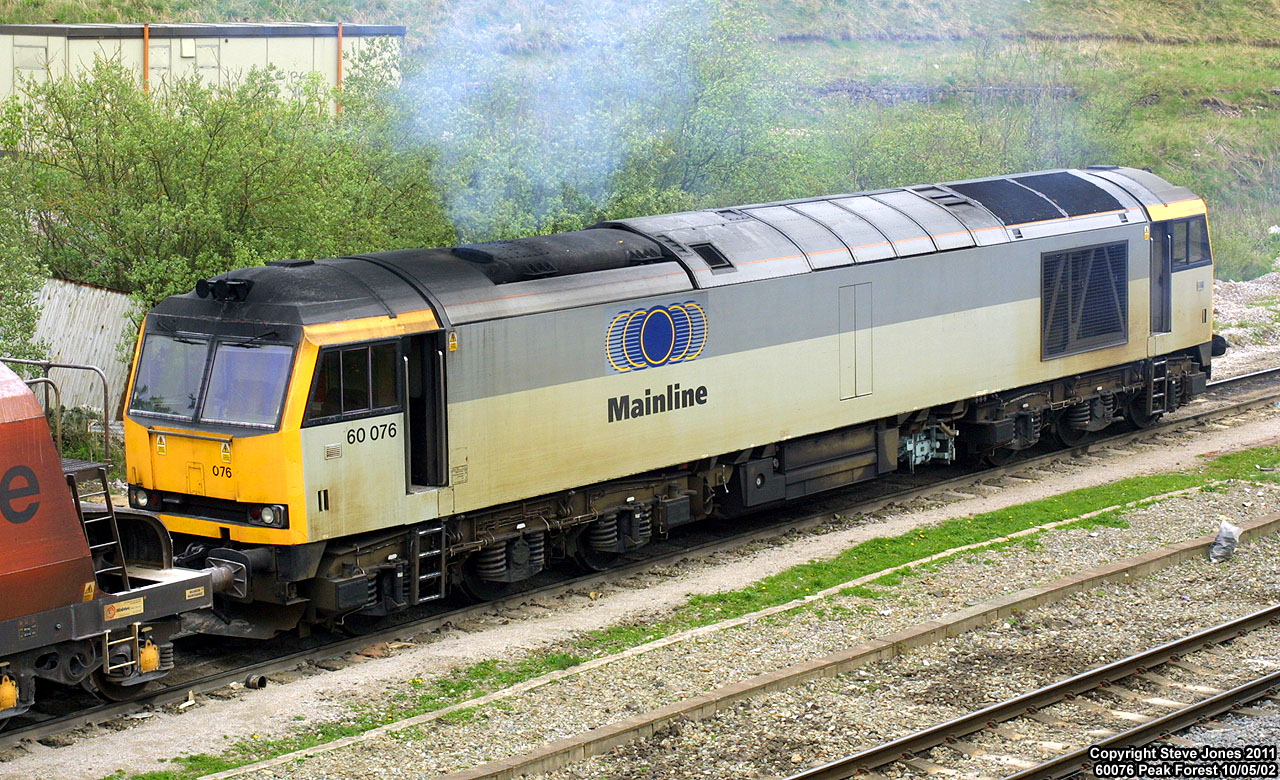
Class 60 in 2002
