= Loadhaul =

British rail freight operator

Loadhaul Limited

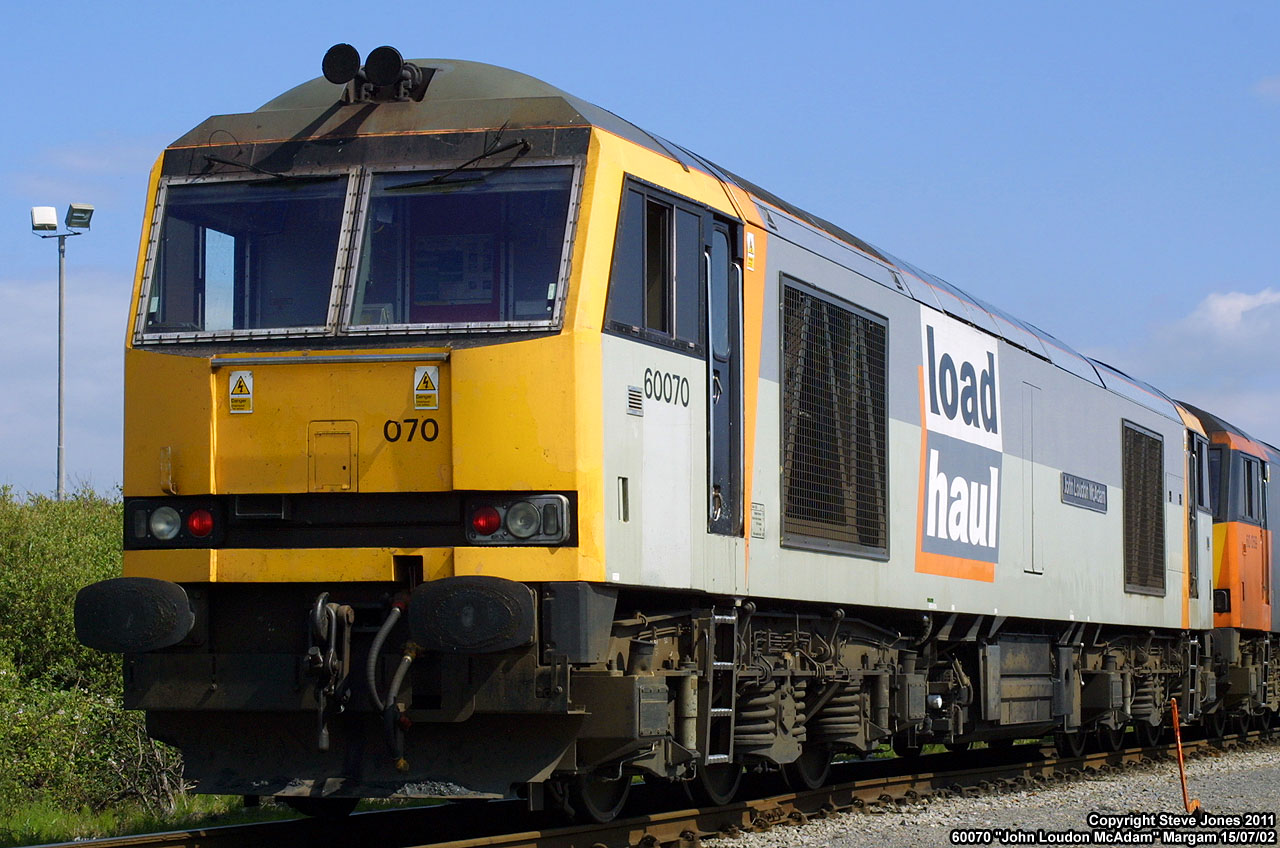
- 60070 at Margam in 2002
- Industry: Rail freight
- Founded: 9 June 1994 as Trainload Freight North East
- Defunct: 1996
- Fate: Acquired by Wisconsin Central Ltd.
- Successor: English Welsh & Scottish
- Headquarters: Doncaster, United Kingdom
- Services: Freight train owner/operator
- Parent: British Rail

Loadhaul Ltd. was a railfreight operator based in the north-east of the United Kingdom. It was formed in 1994, as part of the privatisation of British Rail, and acquired in 1996 by a consortium headed by Wisconsin Central, then merged into a new company English Welsh & Scottish Railway. It is now part of DB Cargo.

== History ==
Loadhaul was created in 1994, along with Transrail and Mainline as part of the broadly regional split of British Rail's Trainload Freight operations – Loadhaul's centre of operations were North East England, and South and East Yorkshire. The three companies were created with the aim of promoting competition between the businesses with the eventual aim of being privatised. It was initially and briefly named "Trainload Freight North East Limited" before being renamed Loadhaul Limited.

All three former Trainload Freight companies including Loadhaul were acquired in February 1996 by 'North-South Railways': a company formed by a consortium led by US railroad company Wisconsin Central, for a combined total of £225.15million (approximately $349 million). The USA based Omnitrax in association with Loadhaul management submitted an unsuccessful bid under the name "FirstFreight". The three companies together with Rail Express Systems were formed into a new company, English Welsh & Scottish (EWS).

== Operations and traffic ==
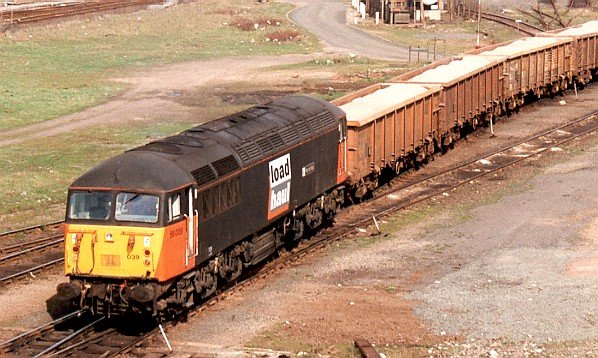
Class 56 in Loadhaul livery with salt train at Tees Yard (July 1998)

In late 1995 the company employed 1,650, with a fleet of 194 locomotives and over 5000 wagons, carrying 38 million tons of freight with a revenue of $225 million (£144.9 million). The company's main locomotive depots were Immingham TMD, Blyth, Healey Mills, Thornaby TMD, Knottingley and at Doncaster Carr rail depot. Headed by Ian Braybrook who was previously a director for Trainload Freight, the company was split into two operational areas, North East and Yorkshire/Humberside. Each area had its own manager and administrative staff.

Coal formed just over half of the company's income, with much of the traffic originating from the Yorkshire collieries and in particular the Selby Coalfield. The Aire Valley power stations received much of the coal, with each power station taking up to 30 MGR trainloads every 24 hours. Coal was also transported in huge volumes to Scunthorpe Steelworks along with imported iron ore. Semi-finished steel products were forwarded from Scunthorpe to British Steel plants at locations such as Lackenby and Wolverhampton. Loadhaul also carried large volumes of petroleum traffic from the Lindsey and Humber oil refineries. Crude oil from the Lincolnshire Oil Field was also delivered to refineries on the Humber. Smaller but regular volumes of other traffics were also carried including paper for news print to Barking, construction blocks from the Plasmor Block plant at Heck near Selby and Salt & Potash from Boulby.

== Fleet ==
The total fleet including stored locomotives consisted of 66 Class 37s, 24 Class 47s and 57 Class 56 diesel locomotives, as well as 33 of the then new Class 60 diesel locomotives. The company also had 48 Class 08/09 shunting locomotives on its books.

An unusual member of the fleet was class 122 'Bubblecar' No. 55012. This single car DMU was used as a driver route learner, for which it also carried the number 977941.

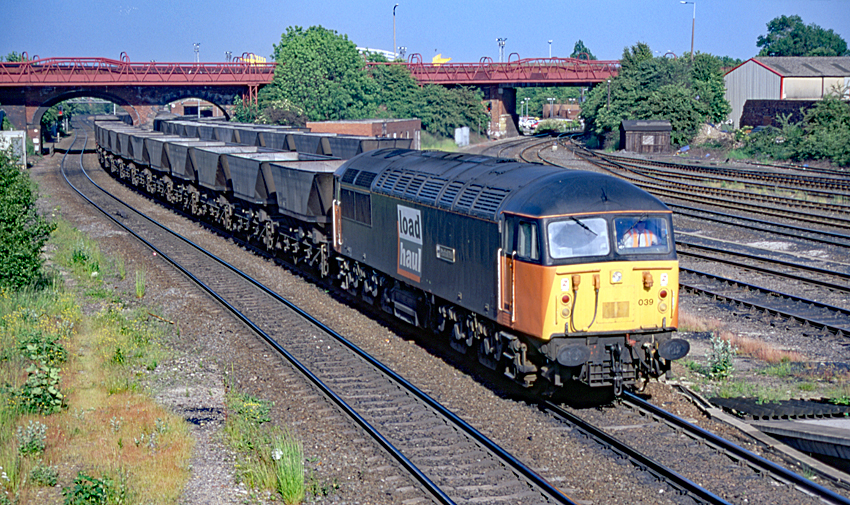
BR Class 56 in Loadhaul livery with HAA coal hoppers at Knottingley

Loadhaul operated 2176 coal wagons, mostly HAA "MGR" hoppers used on power station coal circuits. Smaller numbers of older HEA hopper were used for industrial coal users. 40 MEA wagon conversions from redundant four wheel hoppers were ordered from RMS at Doncaster, these being delivered in 1996. These were primarily for industrial coal customers who relied on mechanical grabs to unload as opposed to having fixed hopper discharge facilities.

1250 wagons were operated on steel traffic, which included the bogie iron ore tippler wagons used on the Scunthorpe ore circuit. Closed vans and infrastructure vehicles contributed to over 1700 other wagons in the Loadhaul fleet.

Loadhaul also ran a number of articulated lorries with flatbed trailers out of the steel terminal at Rotherham. These include ERF and DAF 95 tractor units.

=== Motive Power Summary ===
| Class | Quantity | Image | Type | Notes |
|---|---|---|---|---|
| Class 08/09 | 48 | | Diesel Shunter | No shunters ever wore Loadhaul livery |
| Class 37 | 66 | | Diesel Locomotive | |
| Class 56 | 57 | | Diesel Locomotive | |
| Class 60 | 33 | | Diesel Locomotive | |
| Class 122 | 1 | | Diesel Multiple Unit | Number 55012 was used for route learning |

== Livery and Branding ==
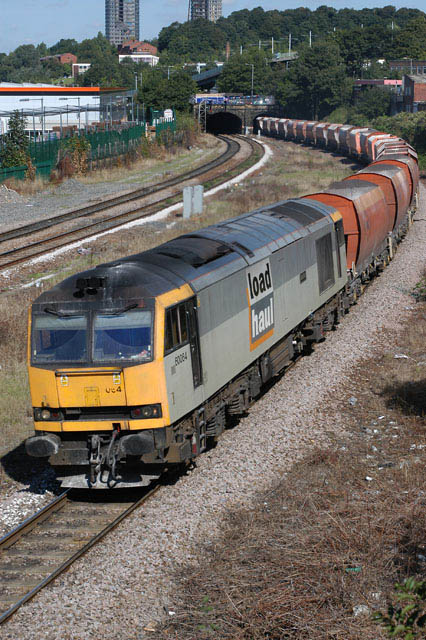
EWS locomotive 60064, seen still wearing Trainload Freight grey with Loadhaul logos

The company was the first of the three trainload companies to introduce a completely new livery. Deliberately breaking with traditional railway colours of Yellow, Green, Red and Blue, Loadhaul introduced a livery of black with orange lower cabsides.

Produced by Venture Design, the livery was also favoured for its practicality. Gloss Black bodysides helped disguise bodyside ripples and oil leaks; Orange lower cab sides helped to hide brake deposits. The logo and livery, with large blocks of colour running across the bodysides as opposed to typical "linear" and "streamline" designs, were designed with the brief to convey the message "Big & Heavy". This livery was unveiled at Doncaster Locomotive Works' open day on 9 June 1994, with 37713 and 56039 being the first locos to wear the livery.

It was the intention of the company to only repaint locomotives where existing paintwork was in poor condition. The paintwork on the Class 60 locomotives was still under warranty and most remained in triple grey livery and received a large body side logo and orange flashes next to the cab doors. However, June 1995 saw 60059 repainted in full Loadhaul livery and named "Swinden Dalesman". Unveiled at the Hillhead Quarry exhibition, the repaint was part of a public relations exercise with Tilcon Roadstone.

Single car route learner DMU number 55012 also received Loadhaul livery, which it carried through the EWS era up to withdrawal. No shunters received Loadhaul livery despite being operated by the company. Inspection saloon number TDM395280 gained a version of the livery. This was all over black with the orange at full height on one end only. A horizontal orange stripe ran the length of the saloon, interrupted for a small logo.

Many wagons were repainted during the company's short existence, with revenue earning stock such as HEA domestic coal hoppers and BDA and BSA steel flats being reliveried during refurbishment. The 40 new MEA open box wagons received a black livery upon completion but didn't feature any orange markings. Many examples of non-revenue earning stock (engineering wagons) were also re-liveried. These included YGB and YGH ballast hoppers, ZFV, ZCA open spoil wagons and a shark brake van.

The fleet of road vehicles working out of Rotherham Steel Terminal received the Loadhaul livery. This consisted of an all-over black livery with small Loadhaul logos on the cab doors then an optional orange flash down the rear of the cab side. The wording "Rotherham Depot" in orange block letters was prominent on the cab headboard. Trailers had orange ends similar to flatbed rolling stock.

Branding of traction depots and yards was also in the design remit. External signage was black with an orange triangle low down in one corner. A small Loadhaul logo featured with the facility name in large white lettering.
