= Transrail Freight =

Freight division of British Rail

Transrail Freight Ltd

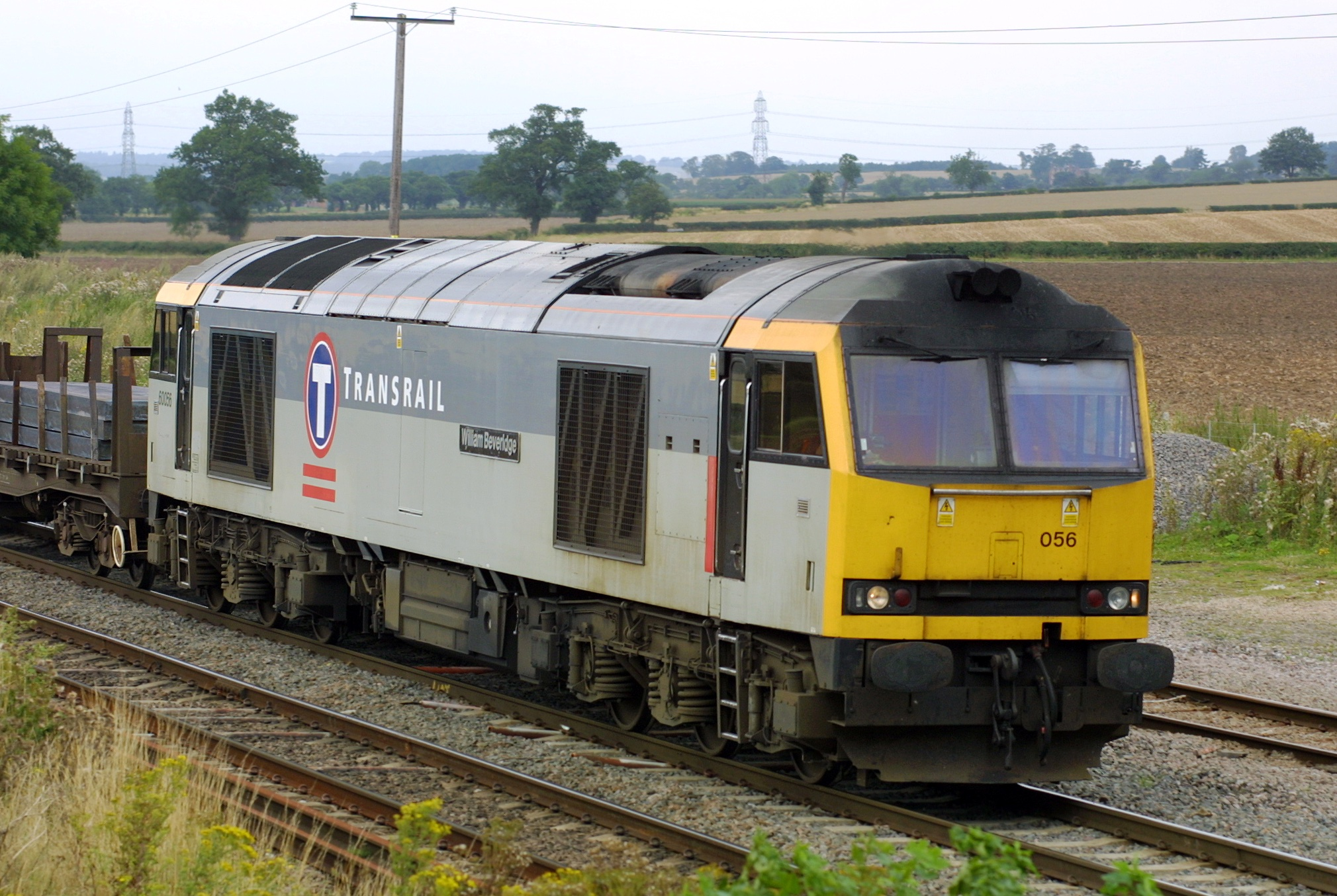
- 60056 at Elford in 2002
- Industry: Rail freight
- Founded: 9 June 1994 as Trainload Freight West
- Defunct: 1996
- Fate: Acquired by Wisconsin Central Ltd.
- Successor: English Welsh & Scottish
- Headquarters: St Blazey, United Kingdom
- Services: Freight train owner/operator
- Parent: British Rail

Transrail was a trainload rail freight operator based in St Blazey, England, UK with a large operating area including Scotland, Wales and the west of England. It was formed in 1994 from part of British Rail's Trainload Freight division, as part of the privatisation of British Rail.

Mainline Freight, Loadhaul and Transrail were purchased by a consortium led by Wisconsin Central in 1996 and amalgamated into a new company, English Welsh & Scottish.

== History ==
Transrail was created in 1994 along with Mainline Freight and Loadhaul as part of the broadly regional split of British Rail's Trainload Freight operations. Transrail had the largest operating area of the three companies, operating in Scotland, Wales and the entire west of England (South West, West Midlands, and North West). The three companies were created with the aim of promoting competition between the businesses. It was initially and briefly named "Trainload Freight West Limited" before being re-branded in July 1994.

Transrail had the largest inherited operating area of the three post-Trainload Freight companies, but the least amount of traffic. The company initiated a long-distance wagonload train service branded 'Enterprise', later operated by EWS as the 'EWS Enterprise' service.

All three former Trainload Freight companies were acquired in February 1996 by North-South Railways, a company formed by a consortium led by US railroad company Wisconsin Central, for a combined total of £225.15 million (approximately US$349 million). The three companies and Rail Express Systems were merged to form English Welsh & Scottish (EWS).

== Fleet ==
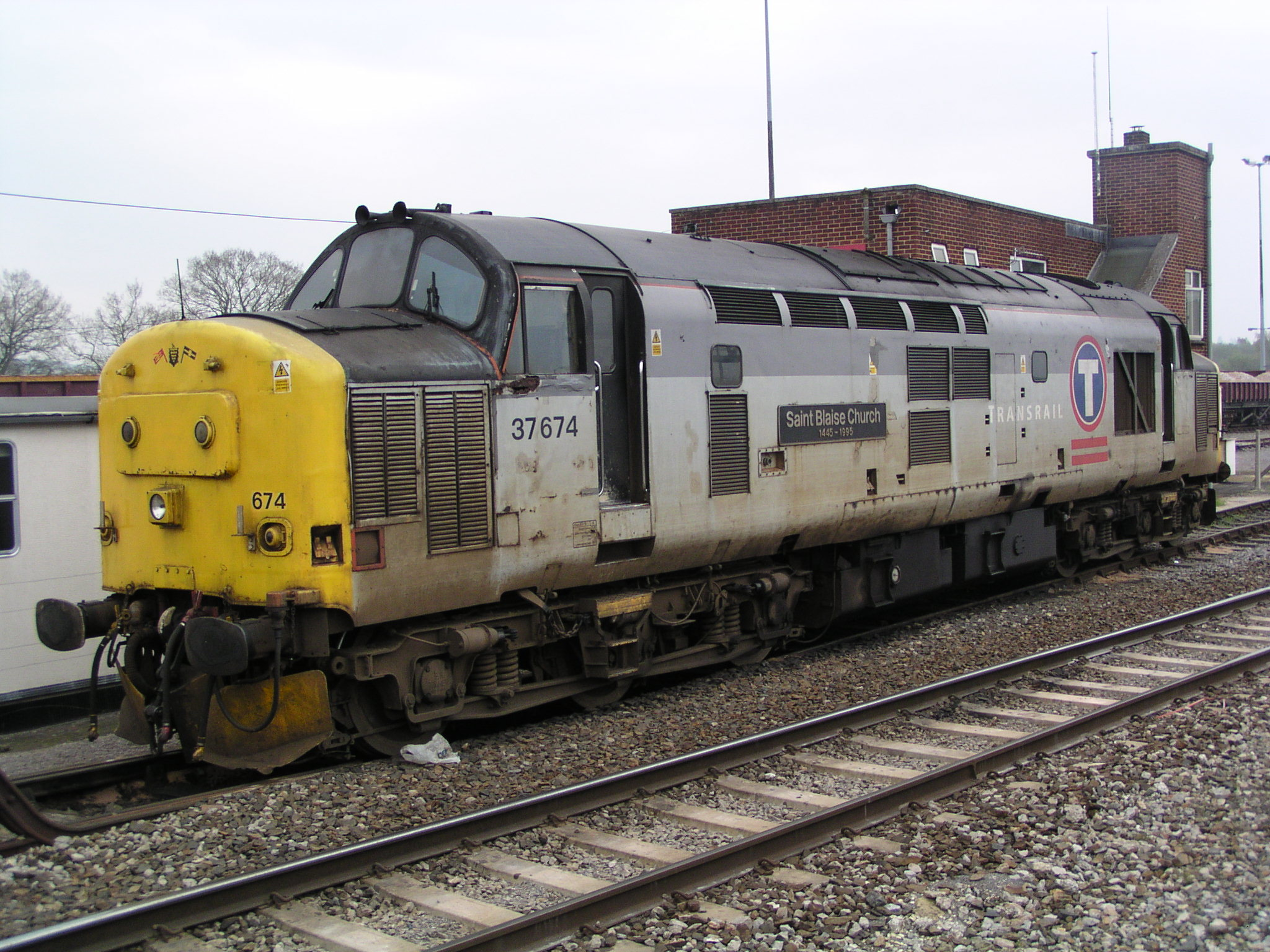
Transrail livery on 37674 at Westbury in April 2004

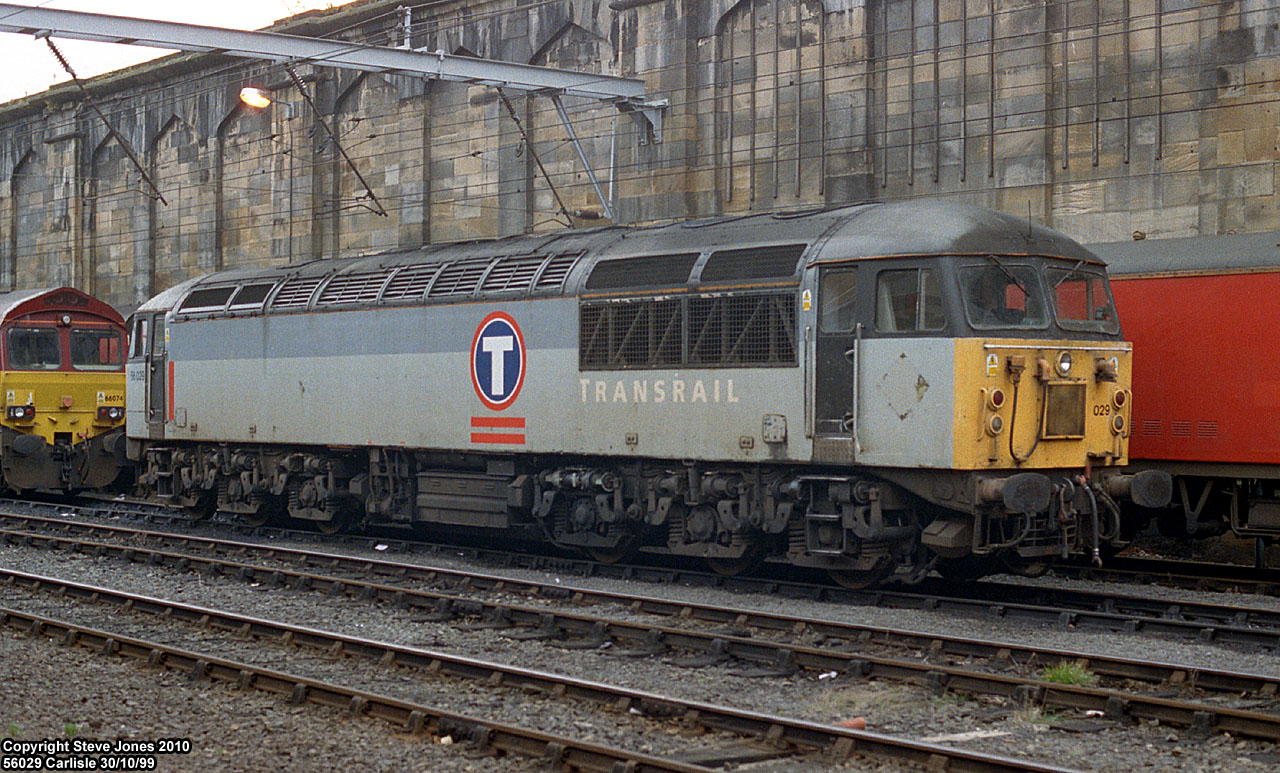
Transrail class 56

Locomotives operated included classes 08, 31, 37, 47, 56 and 60.

=== Livery ===
The company's livery was based on the previous Trainload Freight two-tone grey livery, with the addition of a blue and red "T" logo and Transrail branding. There were also a few Class 37's and Class 56's that carried the blue and red "T" logo with Transrail branding on the Civil Engineers Yellow and Grey "Dutch" livery.
