= Merry-go-round train =

Train that loads and unloads its cargo while moving

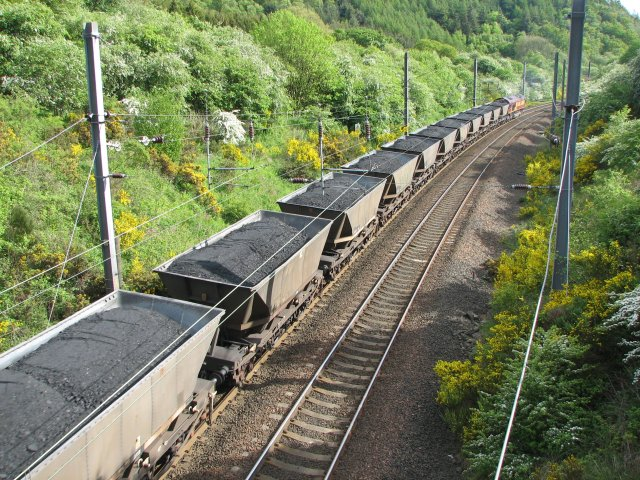
A merry-go-round train hauled by a Class 66 locomotive

A merry-go-round train, often abbreviated to MGR, is a block train of hopper wagons which both loads and unloads its cargo while moving. In the United Kingdom, in the era of coal-fired generation, they were most commonly coal trains delivering to power stations. These trains were introduced in the 1960s, and were one of the few innovations of the Beeching cuts, along with investment from the Central Electricity Generating Board (CEGB) and the NCB (National Coal Board) into new power stations and loading facilities.

== History and description ==
West Burton Power Station was used as a testing ground for the MGR system but the first power station to receive its coal by MGR was Cockenzie in Scotland in 1966. It was estimated at the time that the 80 MGR hoppers needed to feed Cockenzie would replace up to 1,500 conventional wagons.

A 1.2 GW power station, such as Cockenzie, received up to 3 million tons of coal a year, whereas a larger 2 GW plant, like West Burton, received up to 5 million tons per year. By the end of 1966 there were about 900 wagons carrying 53,000 tons a week to four power stations. Power stations that were built to handle the new MGR traffic were Aberthaw, Drax, Didcot, Eggborough, Ferrybridge C, Fiddlers Ferry and Ratcliffe. Many of the older power stations were gradually converted to MGR operation.

Merry-go-round operation was also adopted for the Immingham Bulk Terminal built in the early 1970s to supply iron ore to the Scunthorpe Steelworks from the Port of Immingham.

== The MGR hopper wagons ==
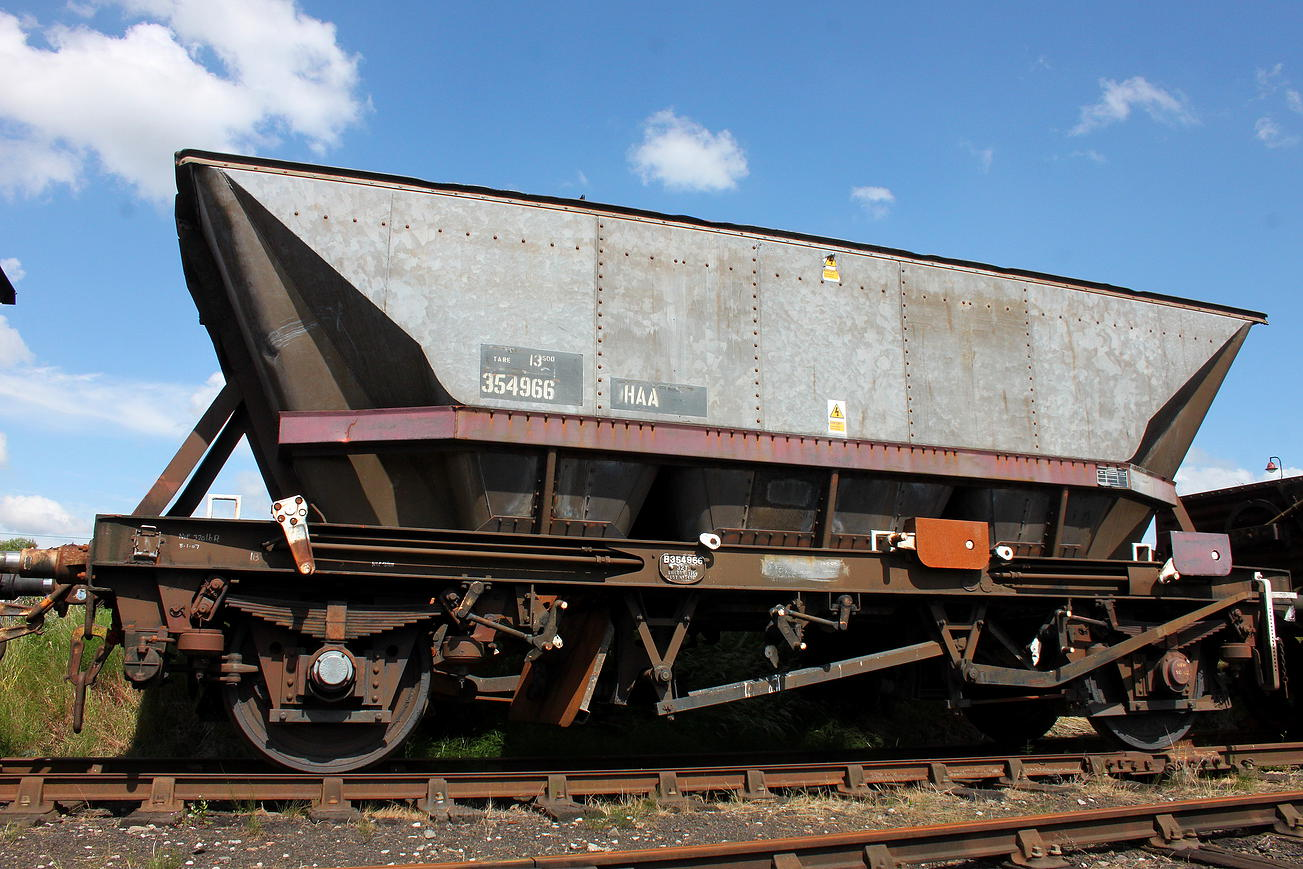
HAA 354966 at Barrow Hill, with EWS-liveried framework

There were 11,162 MGR hoppers built. The numbering ranges were 350000–350001, 350002–359571, 365000–366129 and 368000–368459, known as the Mk1, Mk2, Mk3 and Mk4 builds.

The two prototype wagons, 350000 and 350001, were built at Darlington works in 1964 and 1965 respectively, following which several large batches were constructed at the nearby Shildon works. With the exceptions of the two prototypes built at Darlington and the 160 wagons built at Ashford, all 10,702 HAA wagons and 460 HDA wagons were built there. Most of the early wagons (up to 355396) were originally lettered with B prefix numbers but these were later removed.

While the majority of the wagons were built as HAAs, the final batch (built in 1982 as 368000–368459) were coded as HDA to indicate their ability to operate at up to 60 mph (97 km/h) when empty instead of the standard 45 mph (72 km/h). This was achieved through modifications to the design of the brakes. Another variation, which did not initially result in a change of TOPS code, was the fitting of top canopies to increase the load volume. Many of the early wagons had these but then lost them and for some years canopied hoppers were only common in Scotland.

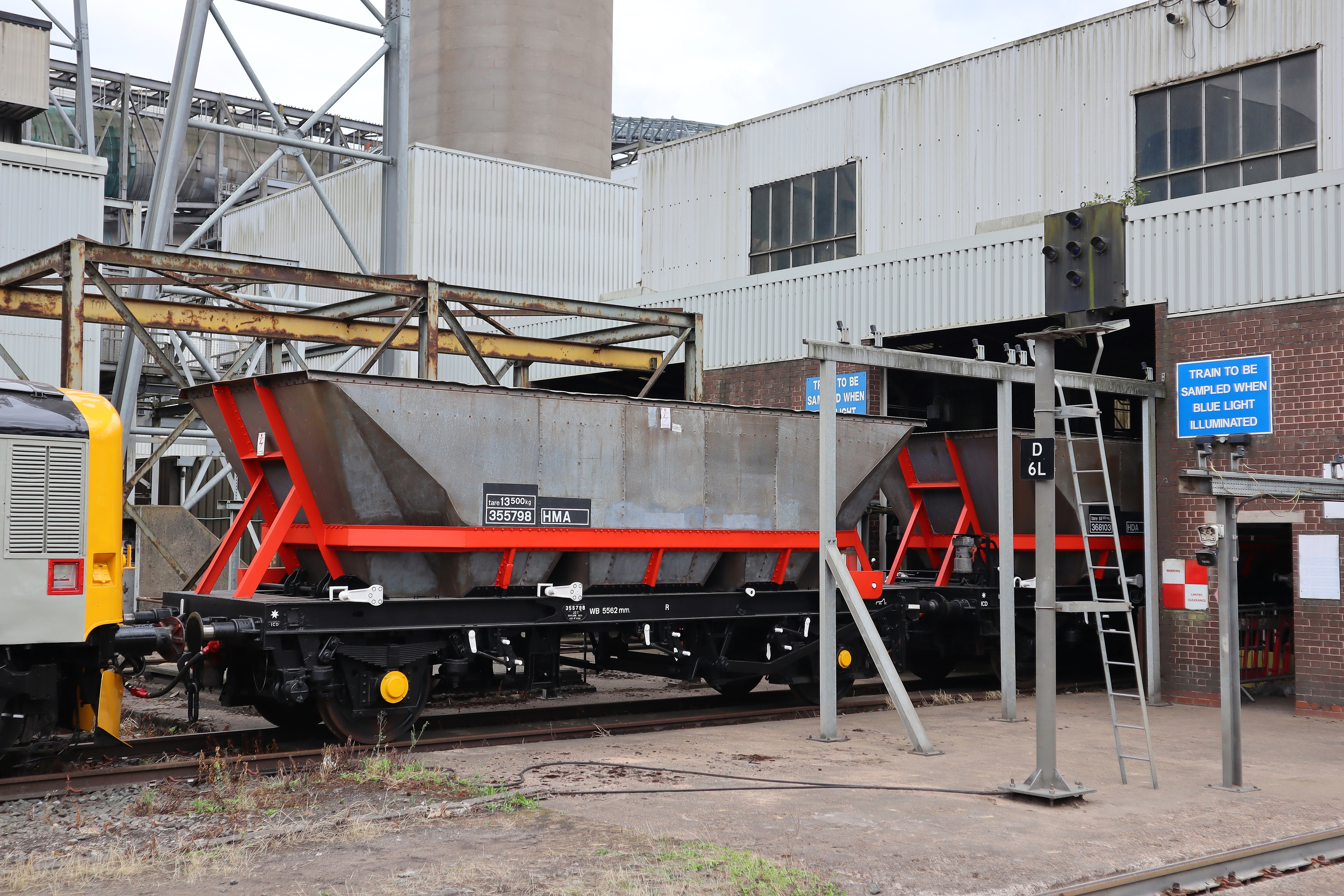
355798 at Drax Power Station

When MGR services were first introduced, British Rail designed an all-new wagon with air brakes and a capacity for 33 tonnes of pulverised coal. The prototype was a 32-ton unit and was built at Darlington and tested in 1964. Before the introduction of TOPS these wagons were referred to by the telegraphic code name "HOP AB 33", this was an abbreviation of Hopper Air Brake 33 tonne.

With the coming of privatisation to Britain's railways, new wagon types have been introduced by EWS (HTA), GB Railfreight (HYA), Freightliner Heavy Haul (HHA and HXA) and Jarvis Fastline (IIA). These new wagons have increased tonnage and air-operated doors that do away with the need for the "Dalek" release mechanism at the power station end of the trip.

== MGR wagon variants ==
With the introduction of TOPS in 1973, the wagons were given the code "HAA", and with modifications to the wagons other codes have been allocated over the years, including HDA and HMA.

From the early 1990s, further TOPS codes were introduced to show detail differences, such as canopies and modified brakes. Many HAAs became HFAs, while all of the HDAs became HBAs, this code now being available since all the original HBA hoppers had been rebuilt as HEAs. Later codes used were HCA, HMA and HNA.

Code	Description	Speed	
Code	Description	Loaded	Empty
HAA	The original design in 1964 of MGR hopper wagons. No canopy or modifications to the wagon.	45 mph (72 km/h)	55 mph (89 km/h)
HBA	The wagon has a canopy in addition to the original design.	60 mph (97 km/h)	60 mph
HCA	The wagon has a canopy in addition to the original design.	45 mph	55 mph 60 mph in block formation
HDA	The final batch of 450 MGR coal hoppers, built in 1982	60 mph	60 mph
HFA	The wagon has an aerodynamic canopy in addition to the original design.	45 mph	60 mph
HMA	The wagon has modified brakes in addition to the original design.	45 mph	60 mph
HNA	The wagon has modified brakes and a canopy in addition to the original design.	45 mph	60 mph

== MGR wagon liveries ==
The livery of these wagons was of unpainted metal hoppers and black underframes. The hopper support framework was originally brown, then red with the introduction of the new Railfreight image in the late 1970s. When Railfreight re-invented itself in 1987, a new livery with yellow framework and a large coal sector logo on the hopper side was introduced. Under EWS the framework is now painted maroon. Merry-go-round hoppers were worked hard however, and the typical livery included a coating of coal dust. Some of the terminals served used stationary shunters to move the wagons forward at low speed. These often featured tyred wheels that gripped the wagon sides, resulting in horizontal streaks on the hopper sides.

== The balloon loop and the "Dalek" mechanism ==
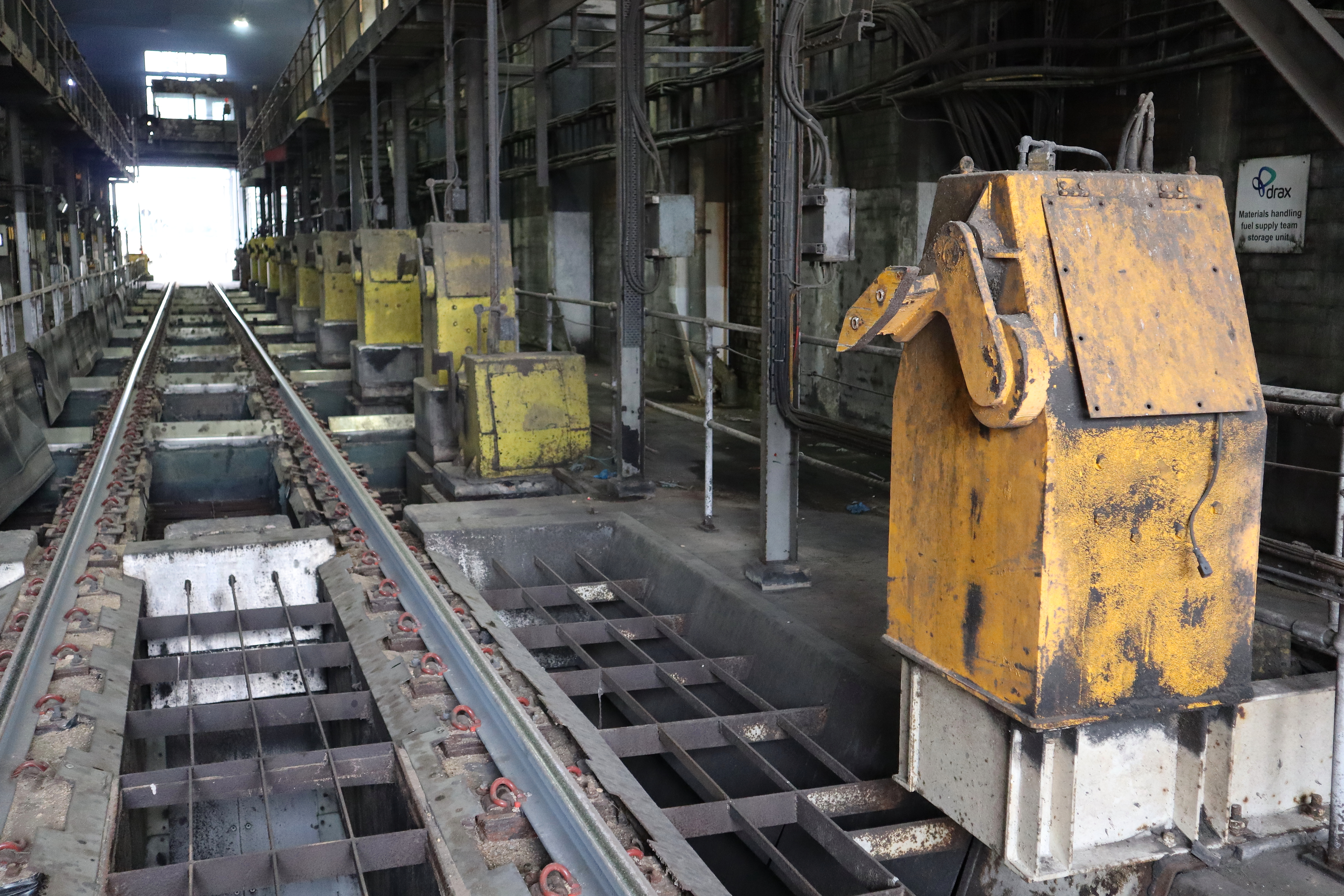
Dalek Mechanisms at Drax Power Station

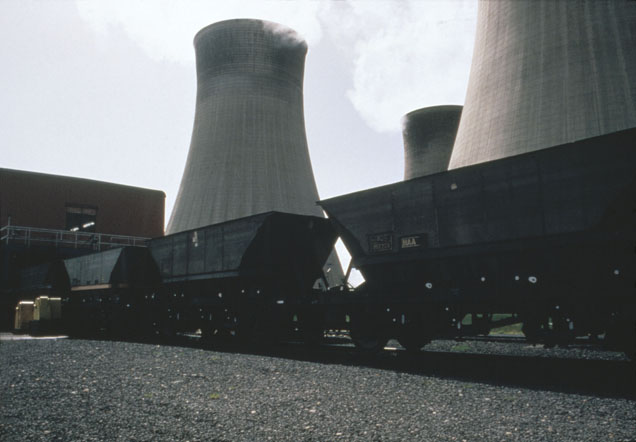
Merry Go Round at Cottam Power Station, 1970–1995

Merry-go-round trains are associated with the construction of balloon loops at the origin and destination so that the train does not waste time shunting the engine from one end of the train to the other. However, whilst power stations such as Ratcliffe, West Burton and Cottam had balloon loops, few if any colliery/loading points had them, and thus true merry-go-round operation never really existed.

"Dalek" was the nickname given to the automatic door opening/closing equipment located on the path to and from the bunker in the power station. The nickname was derived from its appearance. Two have been preserved by The National Wagon Preservation Group from Hope Cement Works. They arrived at Barrow Hill on Friday 28 August 2015.

== Locomotive control ==
Locomotives used on the MGR trains needed to be fitted with electronic speed control known as Slow Speed Control, so that the driver could engage the system and the train could proceed at a fixed very slow speed under the loading and unloading facilities. The system was originally fitted to some members of Class 20, Class 26 and Class 47. Later, some members of Class 37 were also fitted, while the system was fitted to all members of classes 56, 58, 59, 60 and 66. Additionally, all Class 50s were originally fitted, although the system was later removed due to non-use.

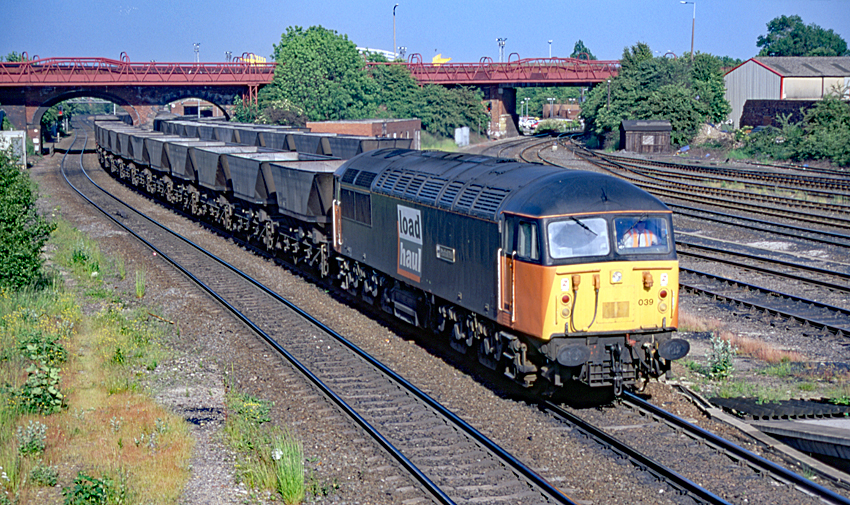
56039 Port of Hull with a rake of empty wagons at Knottingley

The Class 47 locomotives were replaced by the class 56s in 1977 with an increase of the number of wagons in a train, in most cases to around 30 to 34. This was followed by the Class 58s and the Class 60s. Two of the class 60s were named in honour of the men behind the MGR system, 60092 Reginald Munns and 60093 Jack Stirk. A small number of other locomotives were modified for working MGRs. In Scotland the class 26 and some class 20s and in South Wales some class 37s.

In 1985, Driver Only Operation (DOO) was introduced after a short training session on the wagons which mostly showed how to isolate a defective brake. MGR trains in the Worksop and Shirebrook areas to West Burton and Cottam started running. These trains initially had a yellow painted tail lamp to identify that the train was DOO. As the system rapidly developed, the use of these yellow tail lamps was discontinued on all trains.

== MGR hopper decline and re-use ==
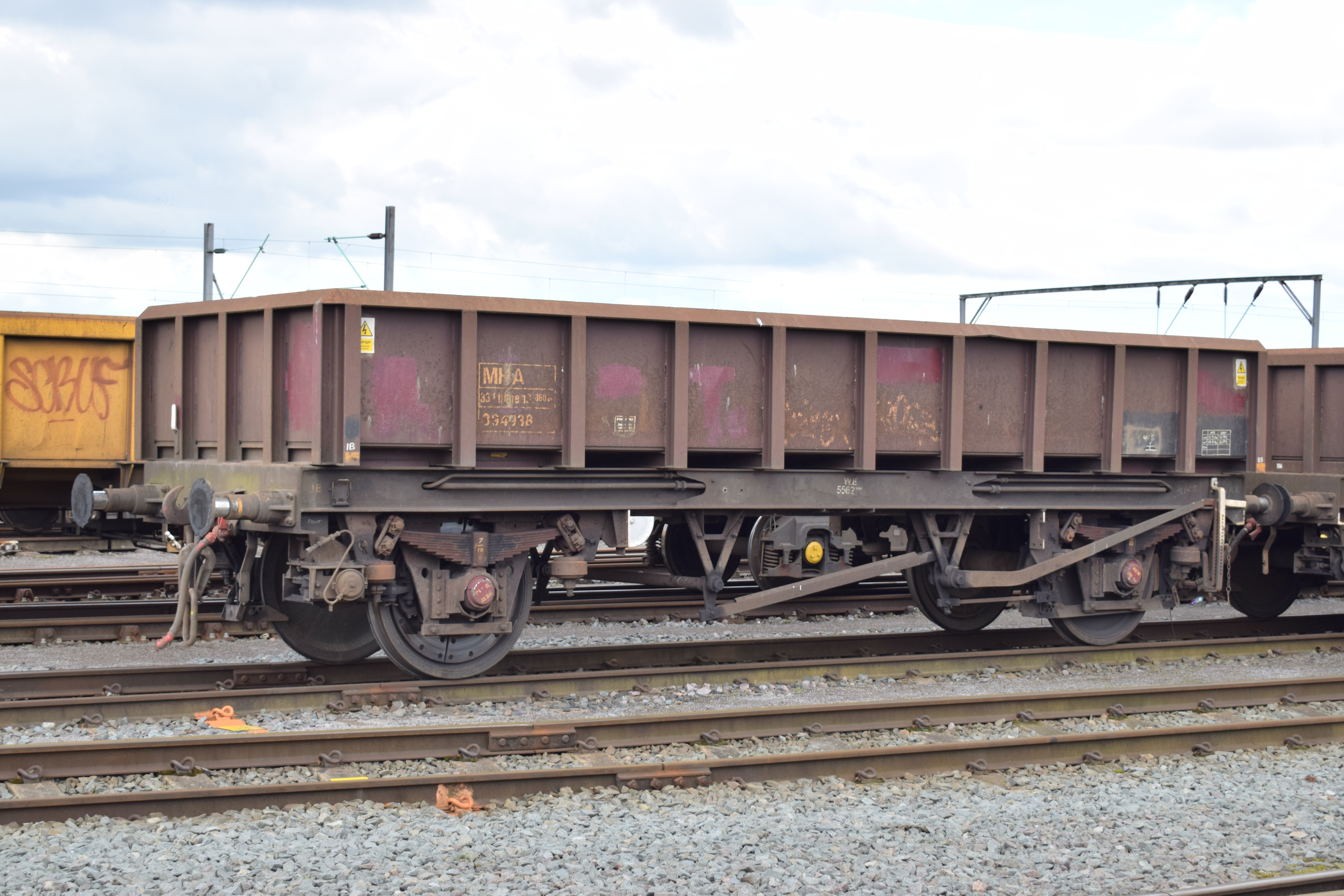
Coalfish 394938

The decline in the UK mining industry from the 1980s onwards made many of these wagons redundant. More of the type were replaced when EWS introduced a new batch of 1,144 high-capacity bogie coal hoppers (HTA) from 2001. The last location to have coal delivered by MGR wagons was the Hope Cement Works in August 2010.

Coalfish Conversions

Although many HAAs were scrapped for being worn out, approximately 1,000 had their underframes rebuilt as MHA low-sided box spoil wagons for infrastructure and general use. Conversions have been undertaken since 1997 and the new vehicles have been numbered in the 394001–394999 and 396000–396101 ranges as detailed below in the table. Wagons not converted from MGR wagons have been omitted from the table. An initial order for 250 extended several times until eventually over 1,150 wagons were converted using two distinct body styles.

Number Range	Builder	Dates	Design Code
394001–394400	RFS Doncaster	1997–1998	MH001A
394500–394999	Wabtec, Doncaster and EWS, Margam	2002–2004	MH001C
396000–396101	Wabtec, Doncaster	2003–2004	MH001C
396102–396165	Marcroft Engineering, Stoke	2007	MH001C

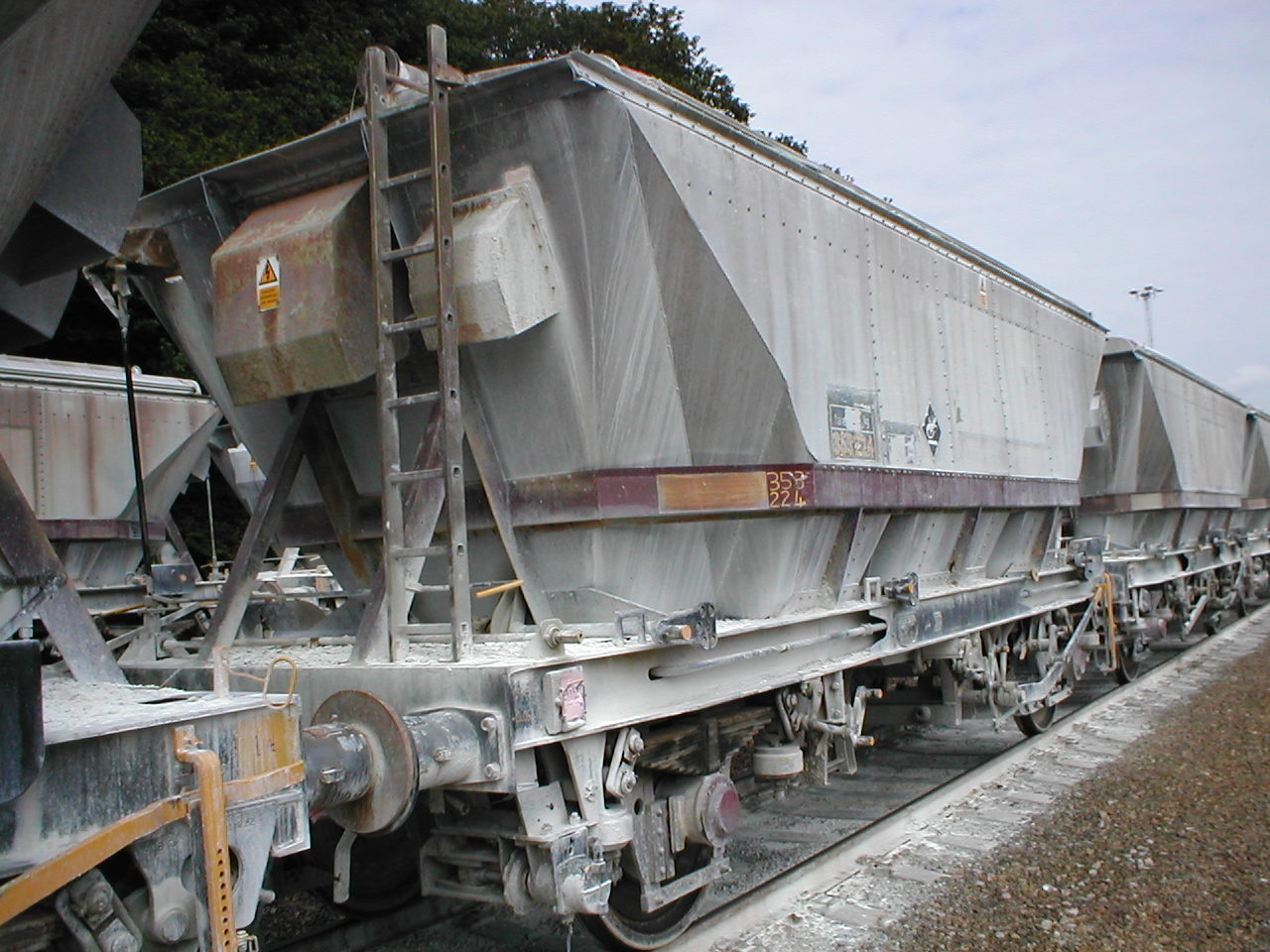
353224 Fowey Docks

China Clay CDA

A batch of fifteen HAAs were rebuilt as china clay hoppers with a canvas roof (CDA), all but one of which were renumbered in the 375124–375137 range and the other being extant 353224 which is listed below. HAA coal hopper number 351297 was the first wagon to be tested at Fowey in 1986. 353224 was the prototype conversion, which was converted at BR Derby Works in 1986, with the 14 HAA wagon conversions completed by RFS Doncaster in 1989.

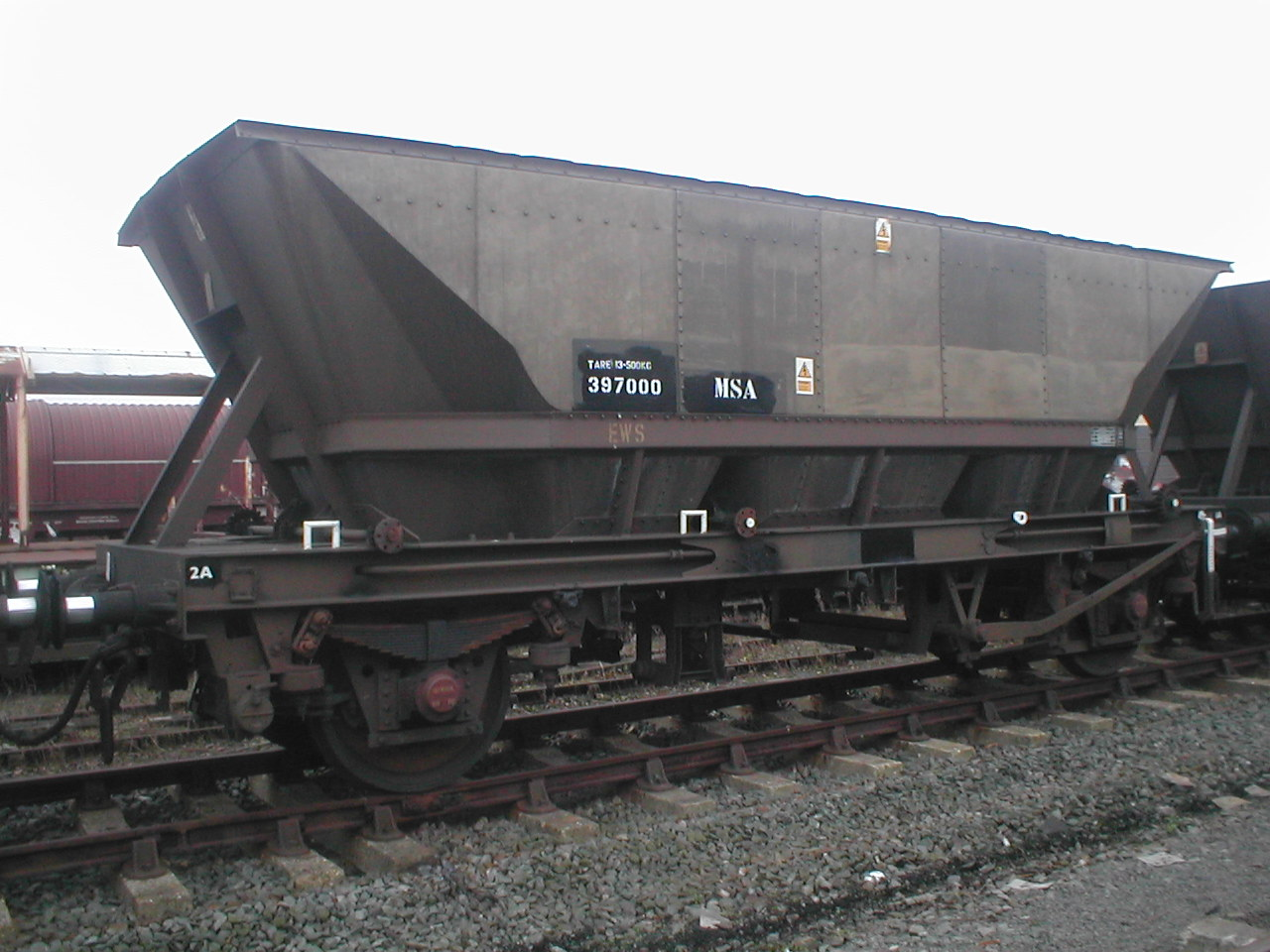
397000 MSA Scrap Hopper

MSA Scrap Conversions

There were eight HAAs modified as MSA Scrap Hoppers in 2004 and renumbered in the range 397000–397008 except 397007, which was missing due to the programme being aborted before it could be converted. The wagons were coded MSA due to modifications their design, having their doors welded shut with stiffeners fitted and the door arms and safety catch strikers being removed.

They proved to be a short-lived idea though, as the light alloy bodies took too much damage from rough use and were withdrawn and scrapped after only one use. It was known to the staff involved in the trial that the wagons would not be up to the heavy-handed task, however the management wanted to continue with the trial regardless.

The first run used unmodified MGR wagons Nos. 356505, 355148 and 356958. The wagons arrived for loading at EMR Saltley hauled by 66152 on 22 April 2004. Though there were more wagons available on the train, only three were loaded. Loading was by shovel loader and levelled and tamped down with a grab magnet. Discharge was at EMR Liverpool Gladstone Dock on 26 April 2004. The wagons were discharged by magnet.

== Extant examples ==
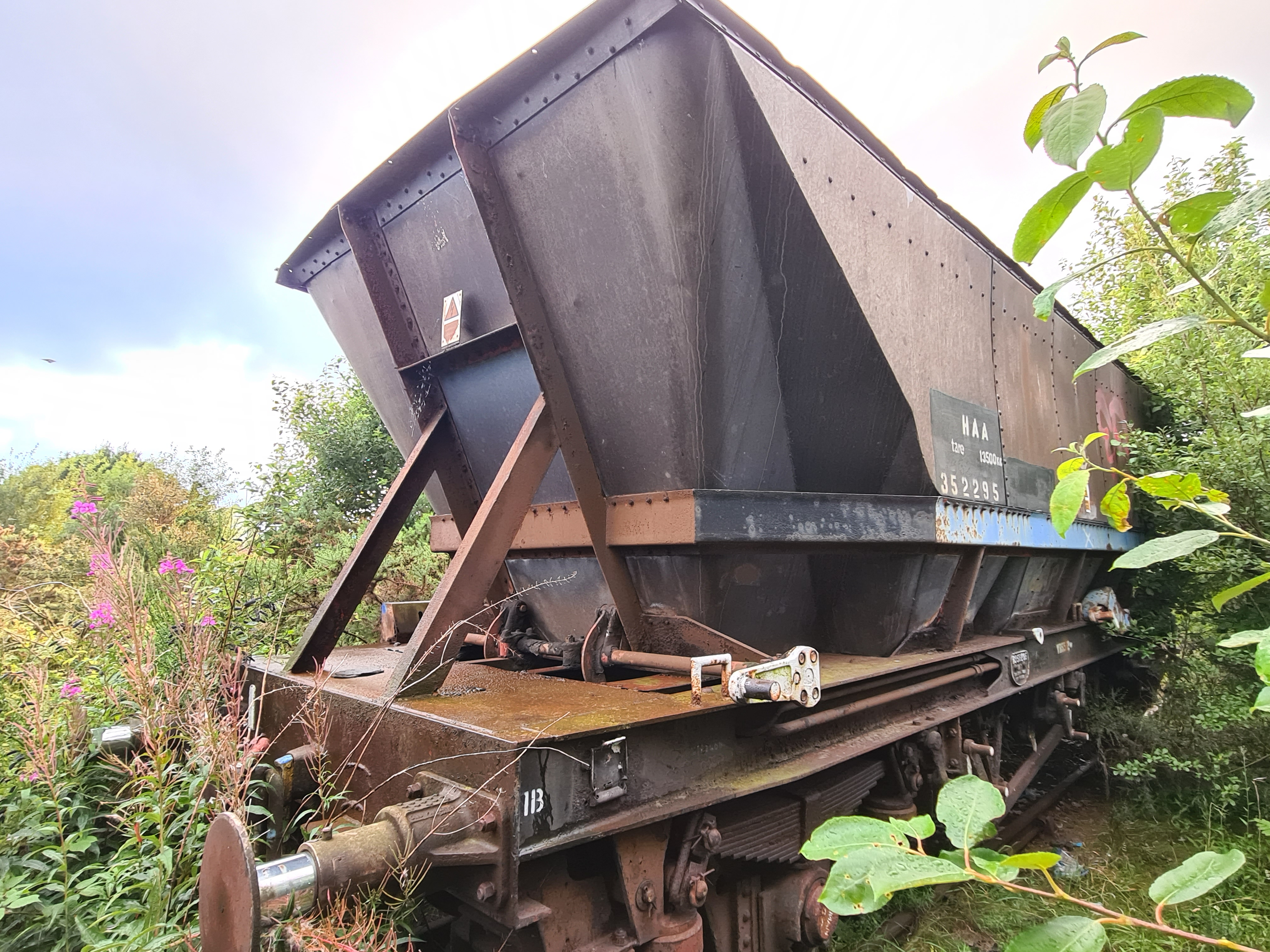

There are now only three MGR hoppers still remaining on the network, excluding the examples that were successfully converted into china clay covered hoppers.

Code	Number	Current Location	Owner
HAA	352295	Falkland Yard, Ayr, Scotland	DB Cargo
HAA	354227	Newport Alexandra Dock Junction Yard, Wales	DB Cargo
HMA	357790	Newport Alexandra Dock Junction Yard, Wales	DB Cargo

== Converted examples ==
The CDA was introduced in 1987–1988 for English China Clays trains in Cornwall, with 124 wagons being built at Doncaster Works. These were given the design code CD002A and were largely based on the design of the HAA coal hopper wagon.

A prototype was converted from a HAA, number 353224, which the National Wagon Preservation Group are custodians of, in 1987 at Derby Works and given the design code CD001A. The hood was provided by G Nevilles Ltd

A further 15 were rebuilt from HAA hoppers in 1989, of which the final three were scrapped in 2024 at Fowey Docks. Those three were used as reach wagons when discharging the main train in the docks.

== Preservation ==
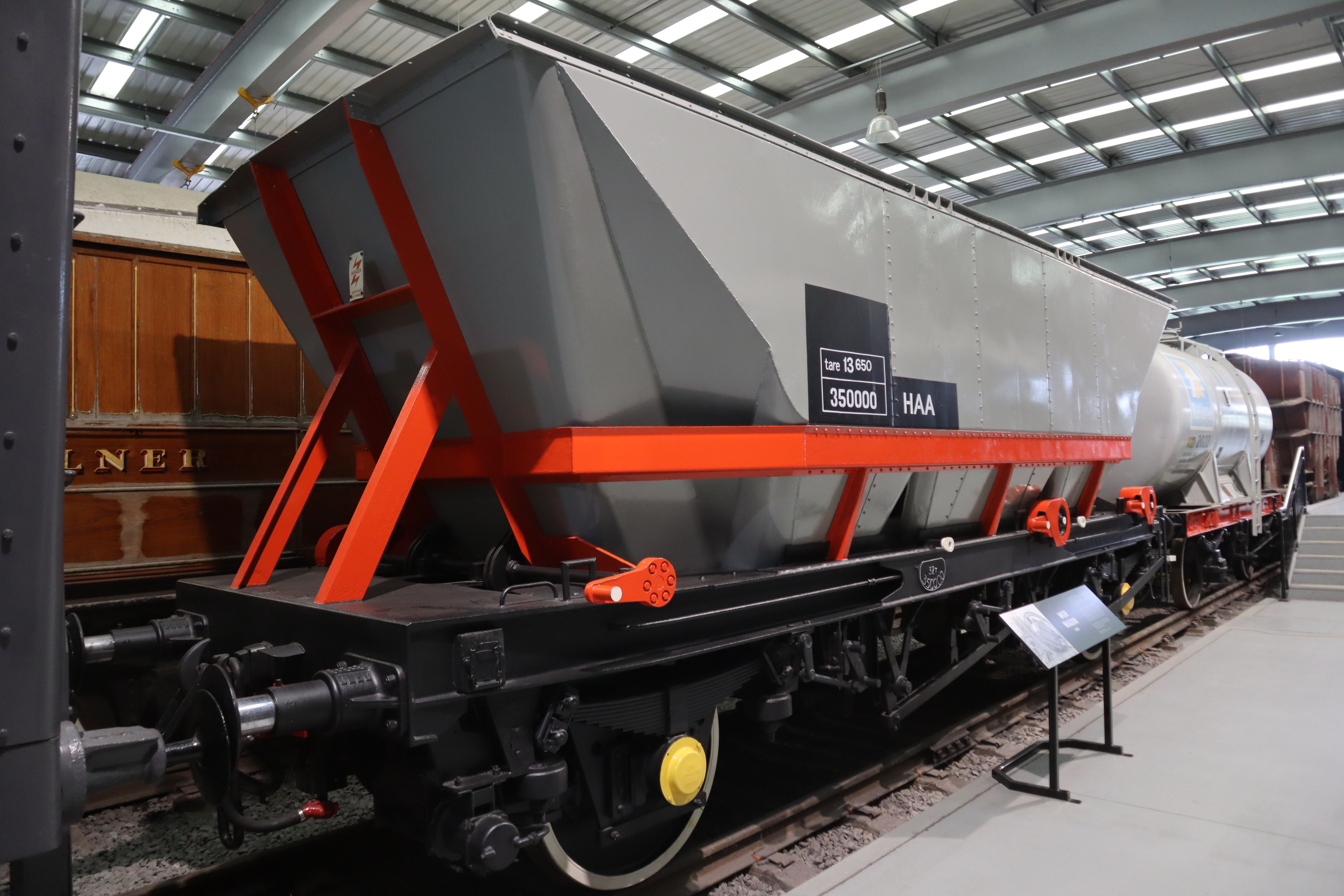
350000 Shildon Museum

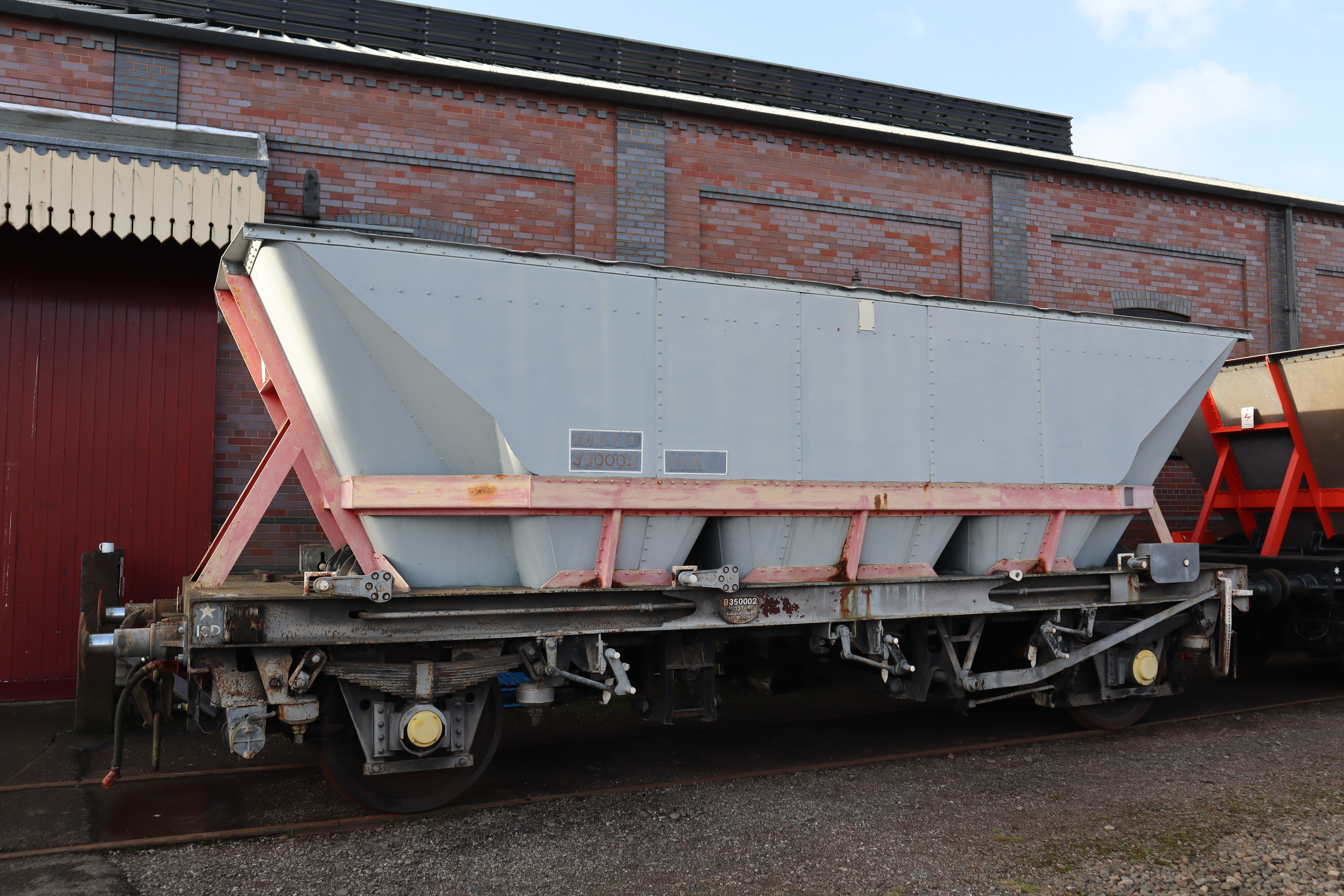
350002 at Chasewater

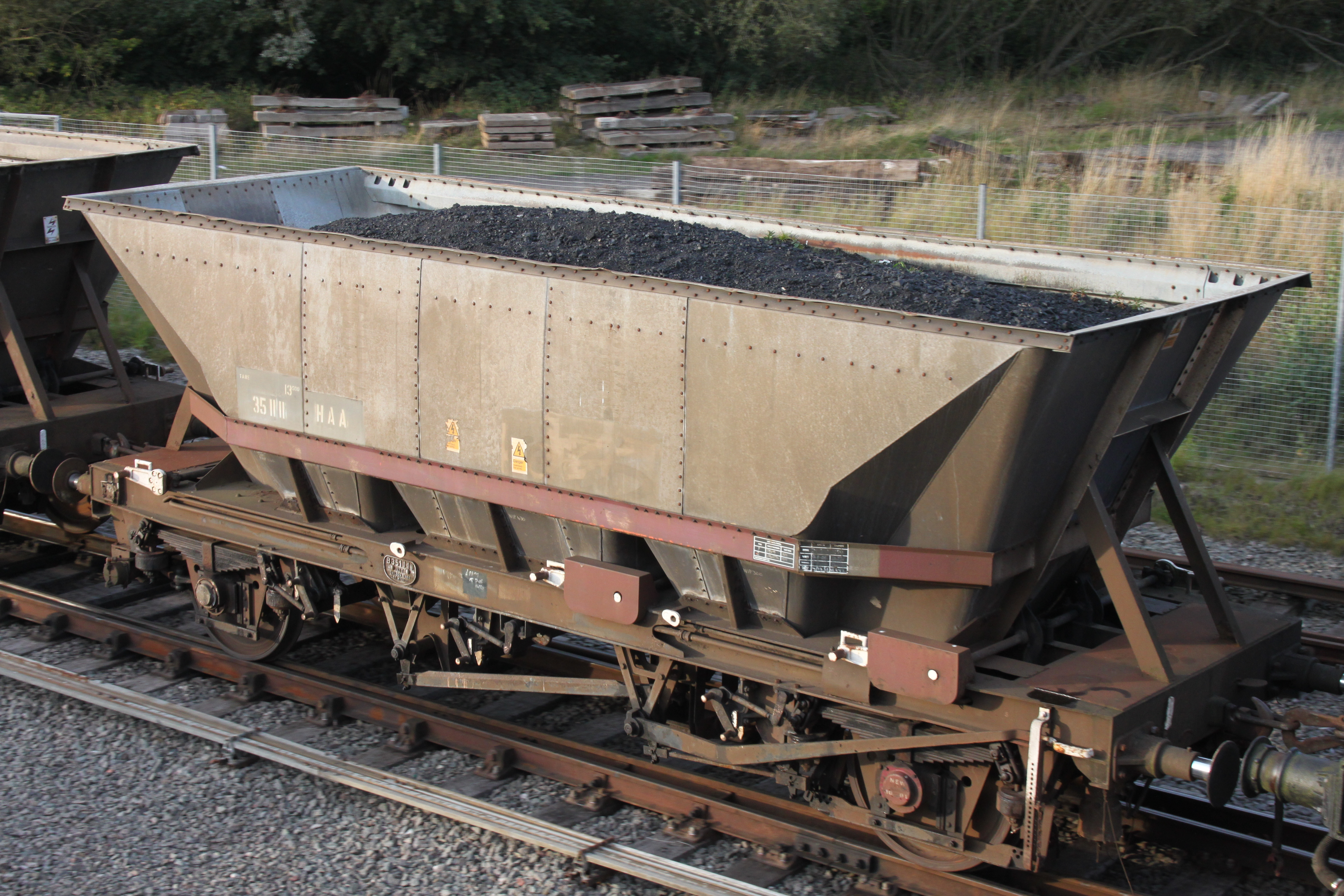
351111 at Chasewater

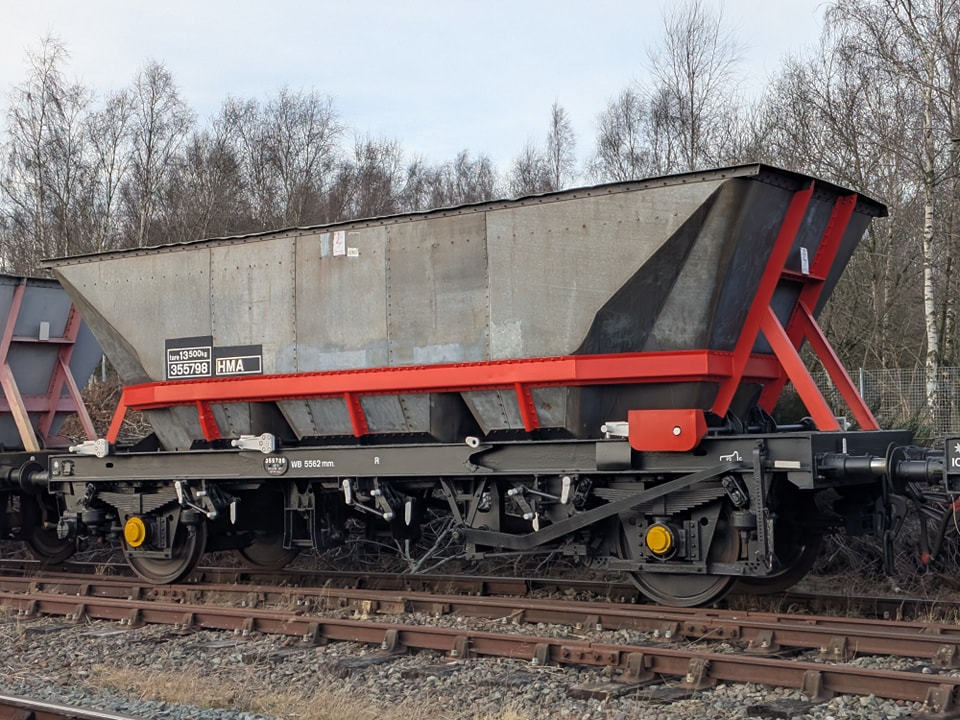
355798 at Chasewater

Several examples have been preserved.

Code	Number	Last known location before preservation	Preserved date	Current Location	Owner
HAA	350000	Toton TMD	October 1995	Locomotion Museum	National Railway Museum
HAA	350001	EWS Worksop C&W	June 2008	Bo'ness and Kinneil Railway	Scottish Railway Preservation Society
HAA	350002	Knottingley TMD	August 2024	Chasewater Railway	National Wagon Preservation Group
HAA	351111	Mossend Yard	May 2015	Chasewater Railway	Chasewater Railway Group
HAA	351500	Barry Docks	January 2011	Midland Railway Centre	National Wagon Preservation Group
HAA	352203	Mossend Yard	May 2015	Chasewater Railway	Chasewater Railway Group
CDA	353224	St. Blazey TMD	November 2016	Chasewater Railway	National Wagon Preservation Group
HAA	354456	Dalmellington Sidings	May 2013	Chasewater Railway	National Wagon Preservation Group
HAA	354966	Onllwyn Washery	March 2015	Chasewater Railway	Andrew Goodman, C/O National Wagon Preservation Group
HMA	355798	Immingham TMD	February 2015	Chasewater Railway	National Wagon Preservation Group
HDA	368103	Mossend Yard	March 2015	Chasewater Railway	Chasewater Railway Group
HDA	368459	Toton TMD	May 2011	Locomotion Museum	National Railway Museum

The first MGR to be preserved was the Darlington-built prototype, HAA 350000, in October 1995 by the National Railway Museum (NRM).

In 2011, The NRM secured the last-built MGR hopper (HDA 368459) and it was appropriately moved to its Shildon outpost in May of the same year.

Notably, in 2014 an appeal was set up called The MGR Appeal to try and preserve another example, this being in the form of HMA 355798. After a successful appeal, it was saved for preservation from DB Schenker. It was formerly stored at their Immingham depot in Lincolnshire. In July 2015, the MGR Appeal was officially formed as National Wagon Preservation Group

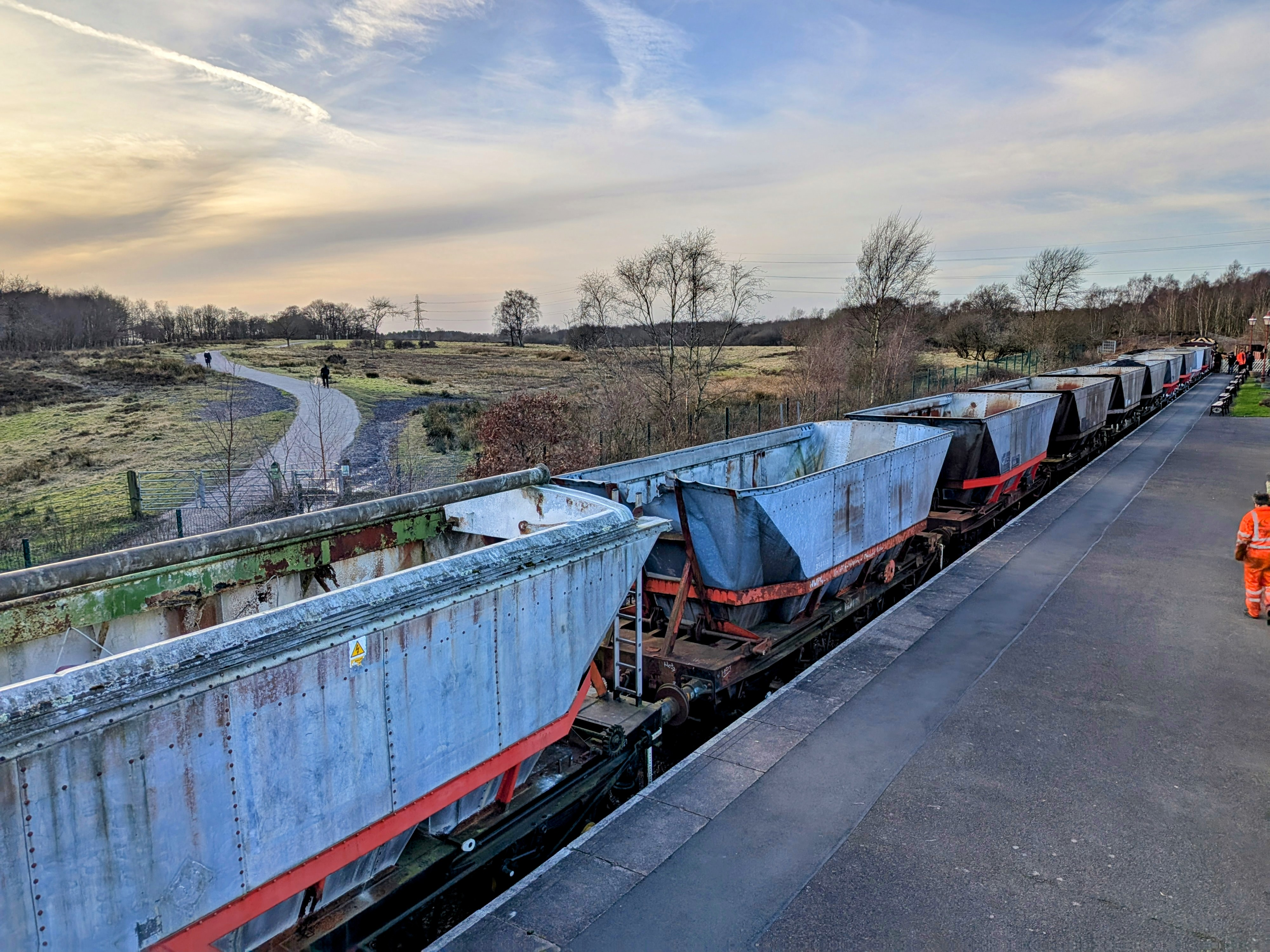
10 MGR wagons at the Chasewater Railway

In May 2015, The Chasewater Railway secured three MGR hoppers from Mossend Yard (DBS) and moved them to Brownhills West station. In their statement, it was advised that these three MGRs were the "arrival of the first half of our HAA wagon fleet". The other three likely candidates are the three withdrawn in the Newport Docks area. Since then however, No.353934 which was stored off the tracks was cut up by accident, however the group is still intending to preserve the remaining two examples. The Chasewater and NWPG came together to create Project:MGR which is a collaborative effort to host the MGR wagons and run demonstration trains regularly to the public.

As of 2024, the NWPG and Chasewater Railway have collectively acquired ten MGR wagons and have regular running days throughout the operating season

== See also ==
- British carriage and wagon numbering and classification
- Kincardine power station
