= CDA wagon =

British railway freight wagon

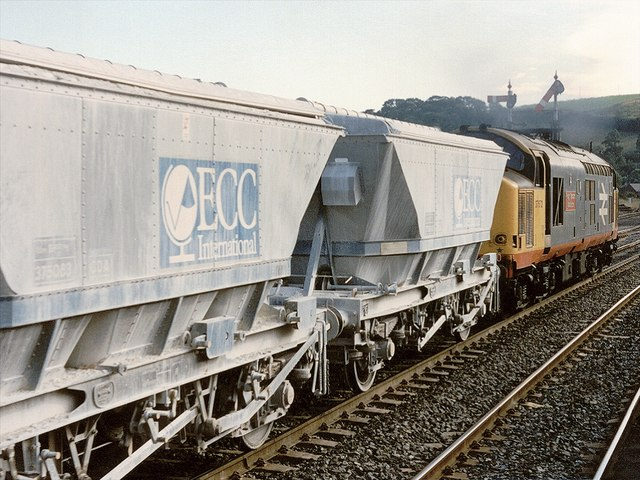
- A Class 37 hauling a rake of CDA wagons at Lostwithiel
- Manufacturer: BREL; RFS
- Order no.: Lot 4062
- Built at: Doncaster
- Replaced: UCV/OOV clay hoods
- Constructed: 1987–1988, 1989
- Entered service: 1988–2023
- Refurbished: 1999–2000
- Number built: 139 (124 new, 15 converted HAA)
- Number preserved: 12
- Design code: CDA
- Fleet numbers: 353224, 375000–375137
- Capacity: 31.5 tonnes (34.7 tons) (tare 15.45 tonnes (17.03 tons))

Specifications
- Car length: 9,042 millimetres (356 in)
- Width: 2,686 millimetres (106 in)
- Height: 3,600 millimetres (142 in)
- Maximum speed: 45 miles per hour (72 km/h) laden 60 miles per hour (97 km/h) empty
- Track gauge: 4 ft 8 1/2 in (1,435 mm)

The CDA wagon was a type of hopper railway wagon used by British Rail, and then the privatised railway, to move china clay (kaolin) in South West England. The CDA was based on the same design as the HAA wagons which were used to transport coal, with the prototype CDA being a conversion of the HAA type. The wagons were used for 35 years being introduced in 1988, and withdrawn from use in 2023. Twelve examples of the type have been preserved.

== History ==
China clay traffic concentrated at Fowey Docks in the South West of England was previously carried in vacuum-braked wagons coded UCV, or OOV, under TOPS. These wagons were built in the 1950s and could only carry a payload of 13 tonnes (14 tons), so by the 1980s, there was a desire to replace them with newer wagons which could carry a greater payload. HAA coal hopper number 351297 was tested at Fowey in 1986. The first wagon to be converted in 1986 was another HAA hopper, number 353224, originally built at Shildon in 1968. Initially it was coded as CBA, and was not recoded to CDA until full production of the new wagons had started. The success of the trial, prompted a batch of 124 wagons to be built between 1987 and 1988 at BREL Doncaster. A further 14 HAA wagons were converted by RFS Doncaster in 1989. One difference from the HAA design was that the CDAs had a roll-top canvas hood to protect the clay from the elements. The CDAs were 9,042 millimetres (356 in) in length (buffer to buffer), 2,686 millimetres (106 in) at their widest, and 3,600 millimetres (142 in) in height from rail to the top of the wagon. (Note: The prototype HHA hopper was 29 feet 8 inches (9.04 m) in length, and 9 feet (2.7 m) wide. The first converted HAA to CDA (353224), was 9,040 millimetres (356 in) in length, and 2,692 millimetres (106 in) at its widest.) One CDA wagon could carry almost three times the payload of the UCV/OOV wagon that it replaced.

The wagons were used exclusively within Cornwall and Devon, but when the last Devon flow of china clay from Marsh Mills ceased in 2008, they only saw use within Cornwall. (Note: Other wagons were also used to transport china clay out of Cornwall and Devon to other points in Britain (such as Irvine and Stoke-on-Trent) and to Europe, but the CDAs remained within the South West.) The only time they left the south-west was to go to York Clifton Depot in the late 1980s to have modifications undertaken on their interior wagon coating. A mid-life refurbishment was undertaken by EWS between 1999 and 2000 at Pontsmill, a branch in the St Blazey area. Some of the wagons emerged with new canvasses in a maroon colour, the EWS in-house livery style.

The loaded CDAs were taken to Carne Point, part of the docks at Fowey. Previously, the OOV vacuum-braked wagons had been unloaded there with their sideways-facing doors, but the CDAs, had six doors in the floor of the wagon, and so the unloading point was adapted to the new operation, coming on stream in January 1988. Whilst the wagon doors needed to be opened manually, an automatic hydraulic actuator closed them as they moved away from the unloading shed.

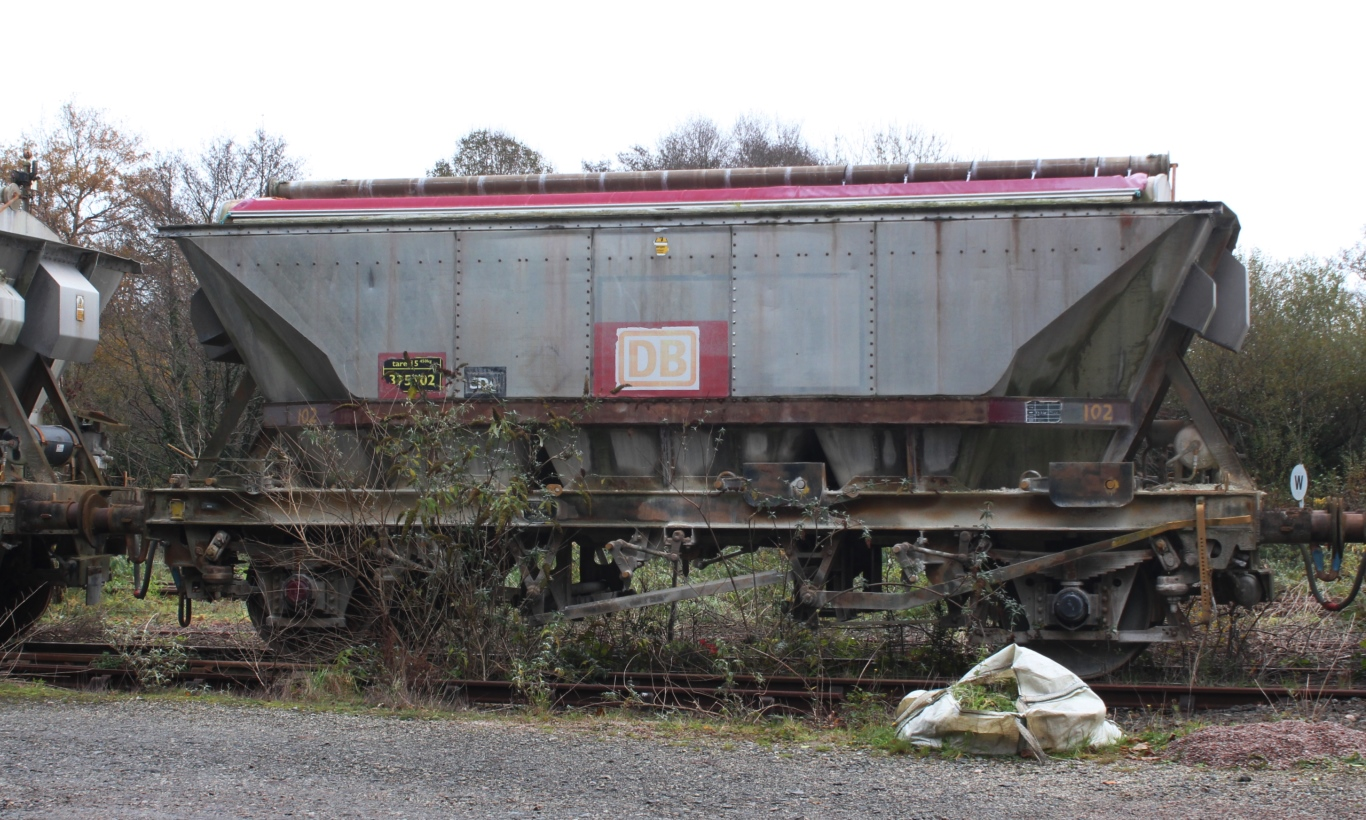
A CDA at St Blazey

The three letter code given to the wagons on TOPS (CDA) meant that they were designated as a bulk carrying wagon for clay, and air-braked. With the rationalisation of loading points and a downturn in traffic (peak loadings at Fowey reach almost 847,000 tonnes (934,000 tons) in 1998), the wagon fleet was less utilised and so by 2014, DB Cargo were only using a pool of 82 wagons. These were marshalled into two rakes of 38, with four spares, and two left at Carne Point as 'reach wagons'. The 'reach wagons' were used to propel the final loaded CDAs into the shed as locomotives are not allowed inside the unloader.

By the 2020s, DB Cargo stated that the wagons were life-expired and beyond economic repair. The last loaded working of the CDA wagons was on 11 August 2023, running loaded from Treviscoe to Fowey Docks, then after unloading, running empty to St Blazey Yard. The prototype CDA and the all the HAA converted wagons were store out of use by 2004, and since then, withdrawals have continued and most of the CDAs have been cut up for scrap at St Blazey Yard. Only three remained outside preservation until September 2024, these being the three HAA conversions at Fowey used as barriers until the withdrawal of CDAs in 2023.(375125, 375135, 375137). In September 2024, the three HAA conversions were scrapped on site at Fowey Carne Point. The china clay workings in Cornwall are now using JIA wagons (ex limestone JGA hoppers were trialled but not a success).

== Preservation ==
The CDA prototype converted from a HAA hopper and numbered 353224, was saved for preservation in 2016. The National Wagon Preservation Group (NWPG), ran a crowdfunding campaign and raised the required funds to save the wagon, and it is located at the Chasewater Railway. The only other wagon that was preserved whilst the fleet were still in service was number 375088, which is stored at the Barry Tourist Railway. In December 2023, nine of the wagons were taken from St Blazey to Par Harbour, where eight were removed by road to the Bodmin and Wenford Railway, while the ninth was taken to the Plym Valley Railway. Another example remained at St.Blazey having been purchased by Mpower, this being 375102, the last of the type to be unloaded at Fowey.

Preserved CDAs:

- 375030: South West Railfreight Preservation Group, Plym Valley Railway
- 375050, 375061, 375063, 375067, 375090, 375091, 375113, 375117: National Wagon Preservation Group, Bodmin Railway
- 375088: Barry Tourist Railway
- 375102: Mpower Kernow, St Blazey Depot
- 353224: National Wagon Preservation Group, Chasewater Railway

== Models ==
In October 2022, Accurascale launched an OO gauge version of the wagon. Other models have also been launched in O and N gauges.
