= Hopper car =

Railroad freight car used for transporting loose bulk commodities

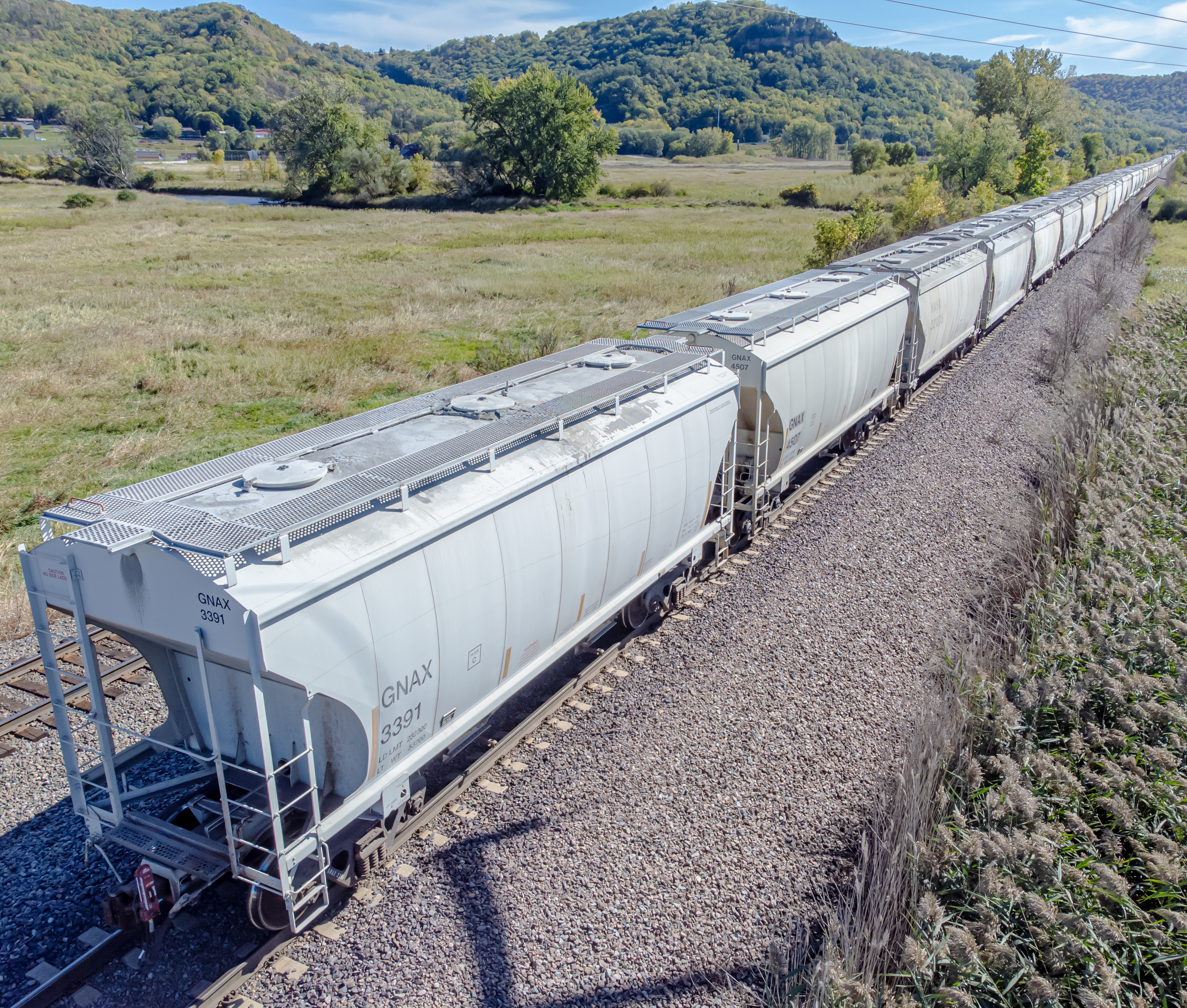
Covered hopper cars carrying frac sand on the BNSF Railway through La Crosse, Wisconsin

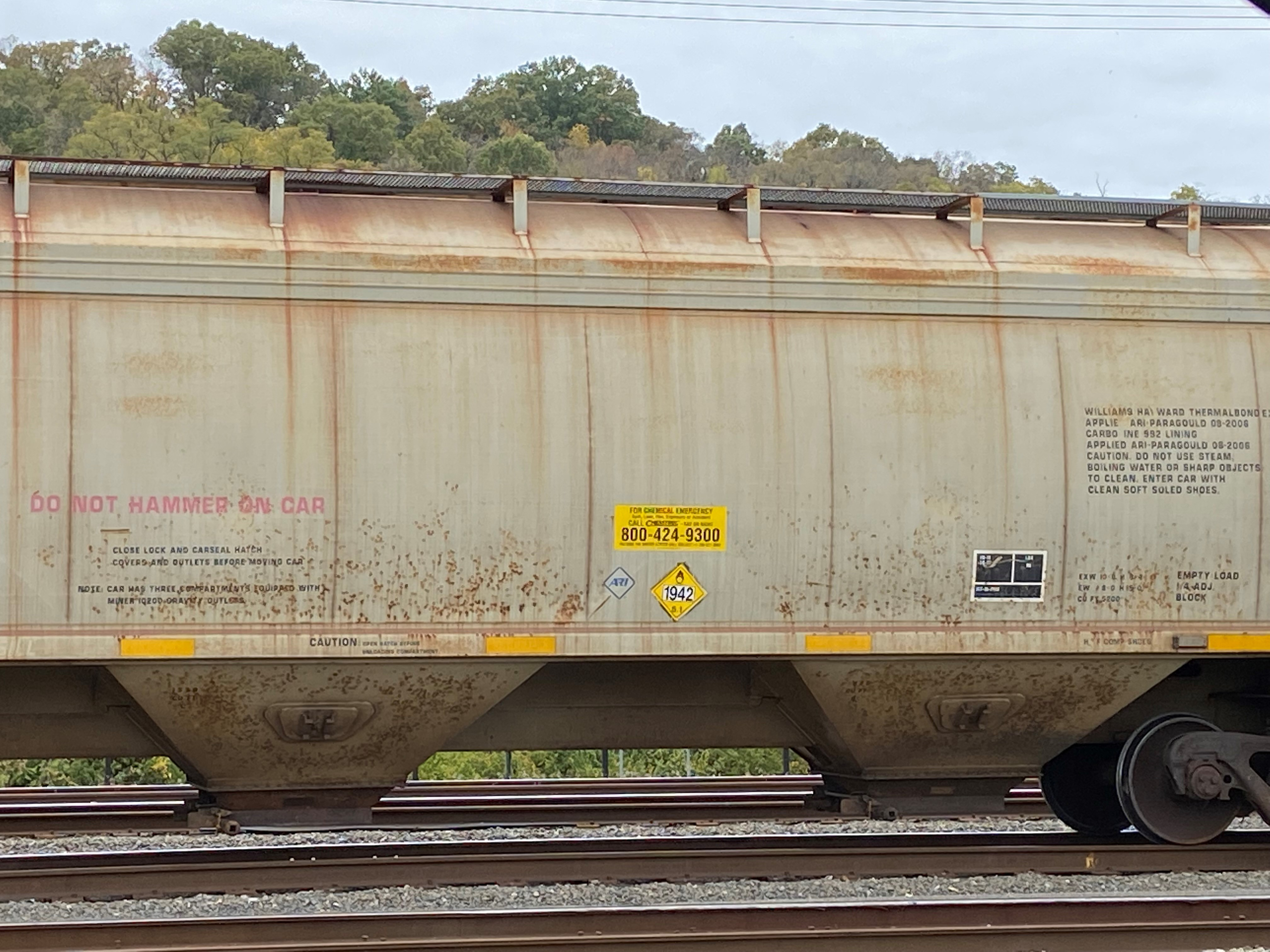
Hopper cars may carry hazardous materials, such as this one in the Midwestern United States. Its payload of ammonium nitrate is indicated by the UN number on the diamond-shaped U.S. DOT placard.

A hopper car (NAm) or hopper wagon (UIC) is a type of railroad freight car that has opening doors or gates on the underside or on the sides to discharge its cargo. They are used to transport loose solid bulk commodities such as coal, ore, grain, and track ballast. Plastic pellets and some finely ground material, similar to flour, are transported in hopper cars that have pneumatic unloading. The bottom gates on the pneumatic hoppers connect to a hose attached to industrial facilities' storage tanks. Air is injected to fluidize the railcar contents for unloading. The hopper car was developed in parallel with the development of automated handling of such commodities, including automated loading and unloading facilities.

Hopper cars are distinguished from gondola cars, which do not have opening doors on their underside or sides. Gondola cars are simpler and more compact because sloping ends are not required, but a rotary car dumper is required to unload them. Some "dual-purpose" hoppers have a rotary coupler on one or both ends, so they can be used in both rotary and bottom-dump operations.

== Types ==
Two main types of hopper car exist. Covered hopper cars, which are equipped with a fixed roof, are used for cargo like grain, sugar, and fertilizer, and Portland cement that must be protected from exposure to the weather. Open hopper cars, which do not have a roof, are used for commodities such as coal, which can suffer exposure with less detrimental effect.

Removable canvas covers are sometimes used to protect moisture sensitive commodities in open hopper cars. Closed hopper cars have a metal top with waterproof loading hatches, which provides superior protection. These loading hatches along the top of the covered hopper may be a single long opening along the centerline or a pattern of multiple round or square openings positioned to allow uniform weight distribution when loading the car.

Some covered hoppers have two to four separate bays, with chutes at the bottom to direct unloading contents.

== Use ==
Hopper cars have been used by railways worldwide whenever automated cargo handling has been desired. "Ore jennies" is predominantly a term for shorter open hopper cars hauling taconite by the Duluth, Missabe and Iron Range Railway on Minnesota's Iron Range. The Coke Express, a CSX unit train of hopper cars loaded with coke, with the words "Coke Express" painted on the sides of the hoppers.

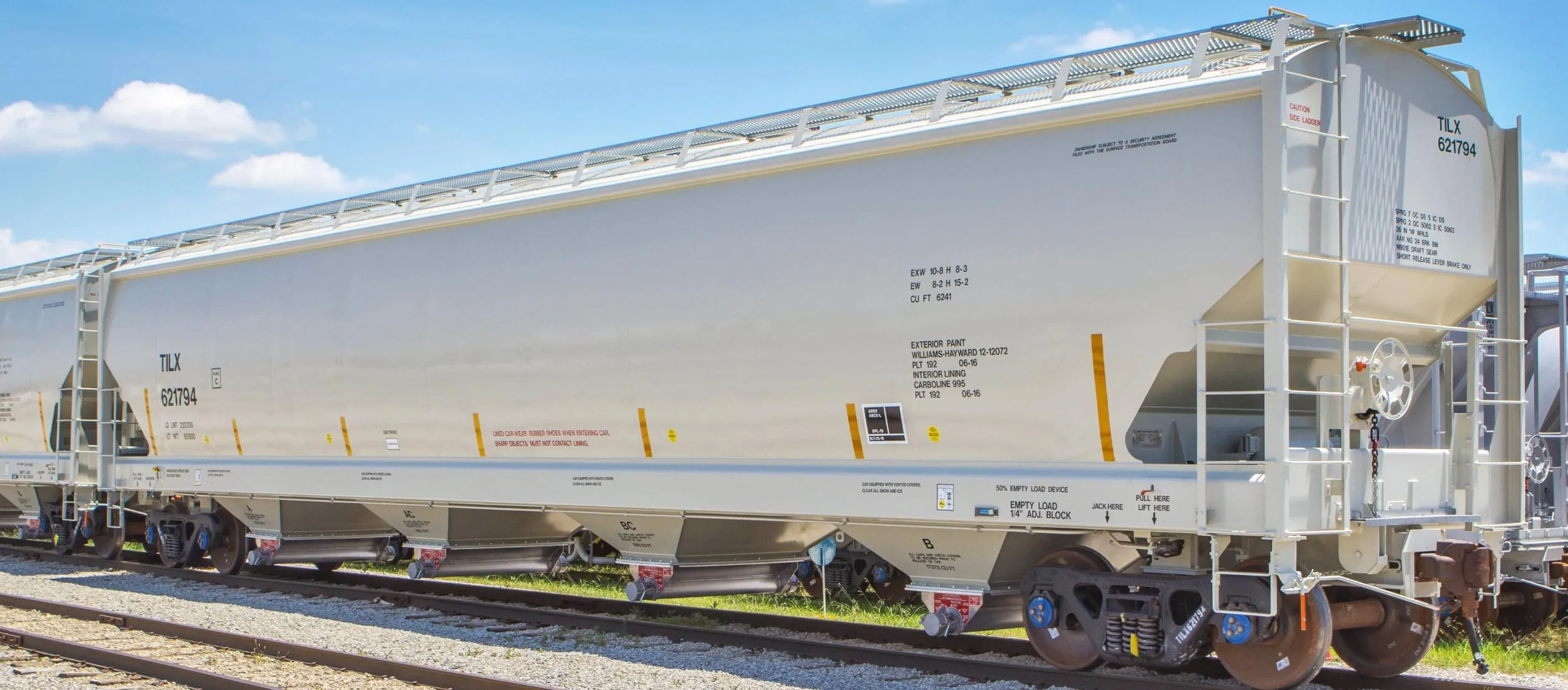
Covered hopper grain car

Large unit trains of various grain crops are a common sight in North America, reaching up to 125 cars long. These predominantly haul grain from the large farming areas of the Great Plains to various markets, but a number of unit trains originate from other major farming areas, such as Illinois and Indiana as well as the Canadian provinces of Alberta, Saskatchewan and Manitoba. These trains may originate from a single grain elevator, or may be marshaled in a yard from various locals (short trains which serve nearby industries). The destinations tend to be large flour mills or ports (for export), or they may be split up and delivered to multiple locations. The empty cars may return as a whole train, or may be sent back in smaller quantities on manifest trains (trains which carry just about any type of freight). These trains are used primarily for hauling products such as corn, wheat and barley.

== History ==
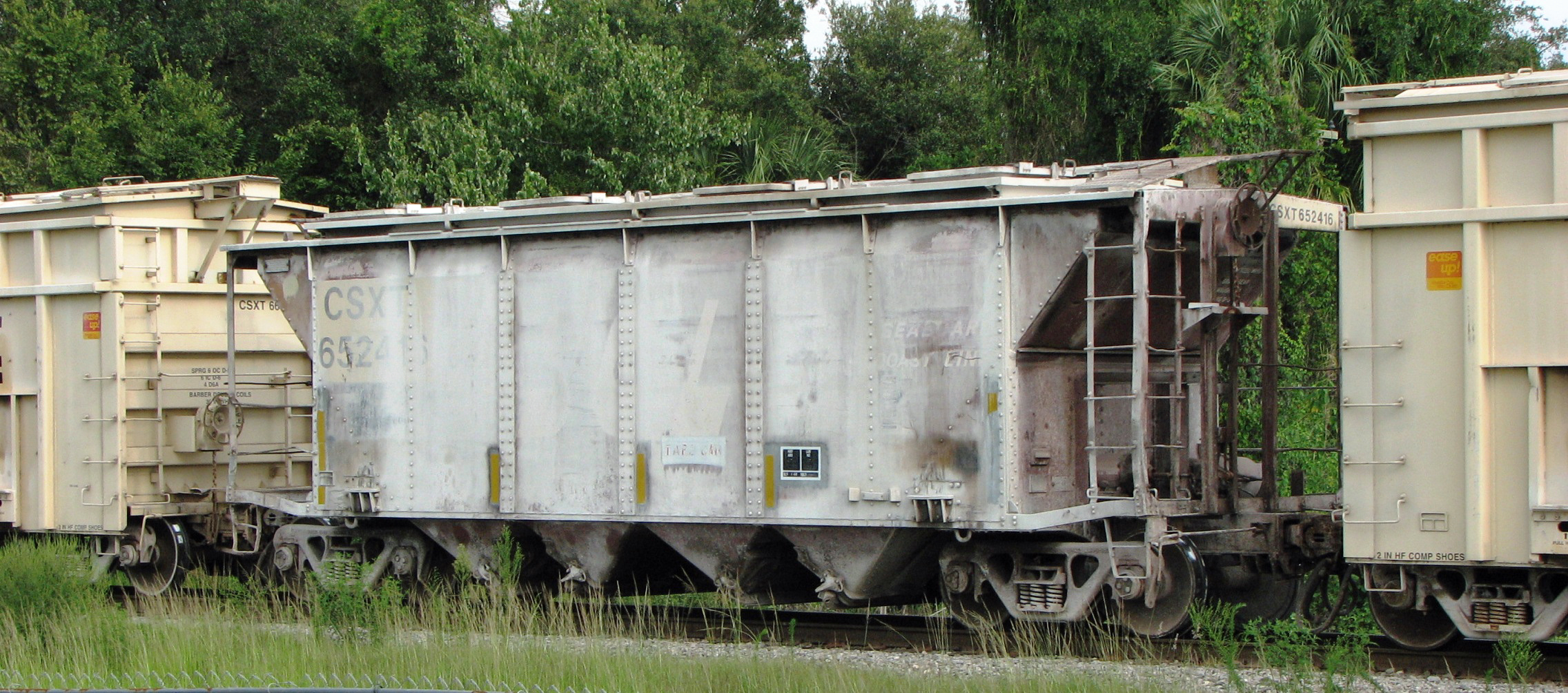
This covered hopper car originally was built in the 1950s for the Atlantic Coast Line Railroad. After the 1967 SCL merger, these cars were fitted with rotary couplers and used in Bone Valley phosphate service.

The word "hopper", meaning a "container with a narrow opening at bottom", goes back to the thirteenth century and is found in Chaucer's story "The Reeve's Tale" (written late fourteenth century) in reference to a machine for grinding grain into flour.

Historically, open hopper cars were used to carry coarse mined products like coal, ore, and gravel, while boxcars were used for granular materials requiring protection from the elements.

Weatherproof covers were added to hopper cars, creating the covered hopper. Early production emphasized two-bay cars very similar to open coal hoppers and suitable for materials of similar density, like Portland cement or rock-salt. Some cars were available in the 1910s, and became more common by the 1940s. These early cars were volume-limited for less dense commodities like grain or sugar, so later designs included longer covered hopper cars with higher sides and three or more bottom bays. Increasing axle load limits have allowed some of the heavier loads formerly assigned to two-bay hoppers to be assigned to larger, more efficient three-bay hoppers.

Some covered hopper cars retain the conventional centersill as a strength member transmitting compression and tension forces from one car to the next. Beginning in the 1960s, designs distributing these forces along the sides of the car eliminated the centersill beam to simplify bulk material handling with wider hopper openings, reducing the tendency for bridging to restrict gravity flow when unloading the car.

== Typical North American freight car weights and wheel loads ==
Common net car loads			Gross car weights		Wheel loads	
Short tons	Long tons	Tonnes	Pounds	Kilograms	Pounds	Kilograms
80	71.4	72.6	220,000	100,000	27,500	12,500
100	89.3	90.7	263,000	119,000	32,875	14,912
101	90.2	91.6	268,000	122,000	33,500	15,200
111	99.1	100.7	286,000	130,000	35,750	16,220
125	111.6	113.4	315,000	143,000	39,375	17,860

Increase in wheel loads has important implications for the rail infrastructure needed to accommodate future grain hopper car shipments. The weight of the car is transmitted to the rails and the underlying track structure through these wheel loads. As wheel loads increase, track maintenance expenses increase and the ability of a given rail weight, ballast depth, and tie configuration to handle prolonged rail traffic decreases. Moreover, the ability of a given bridge to handle prolonged rail traffic also decreases as wheel loads increase. The axle load is twice the wheel load.

== Gallery ==
Non North American hopper cars

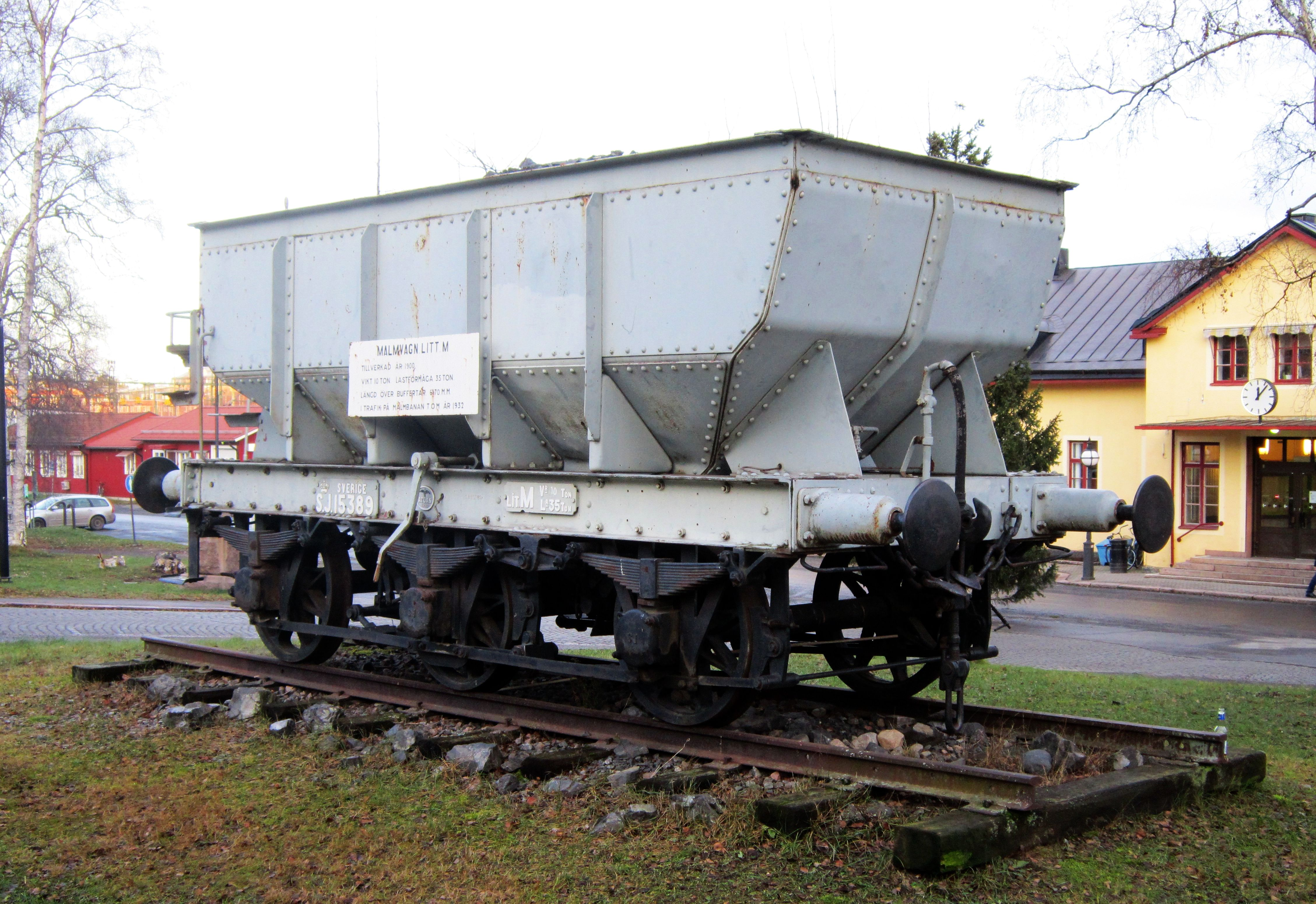
Swedish iron ore hopper (mineral wagon), built in 1900

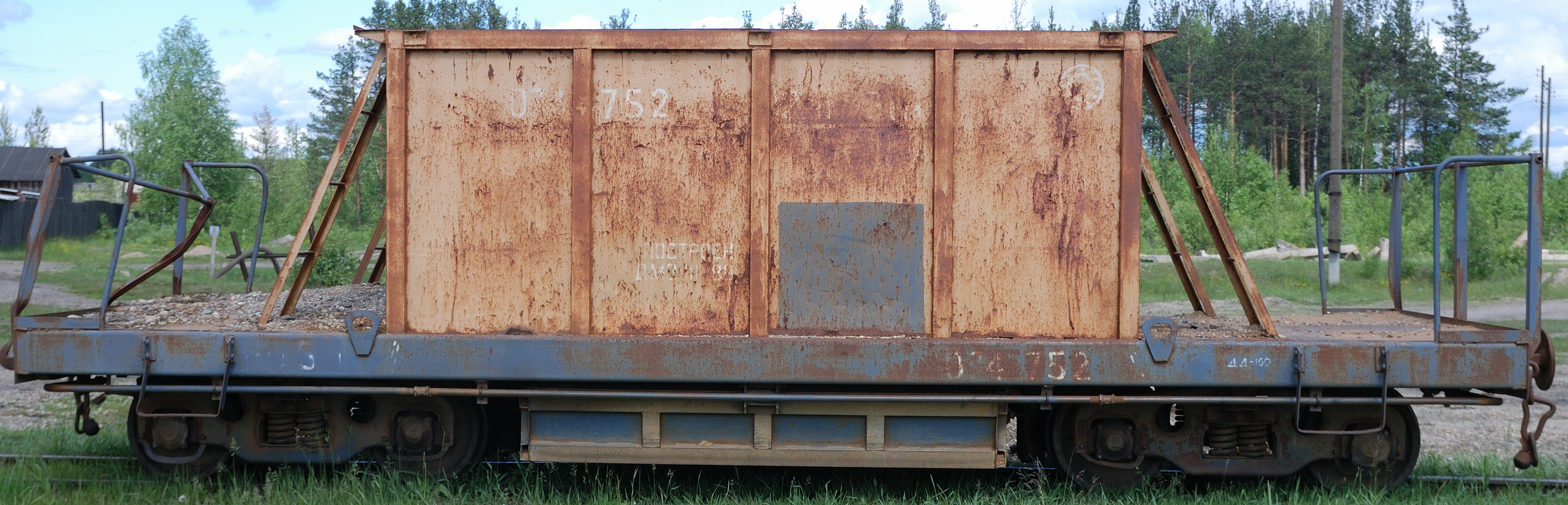
Kambarka Engineering Works hopper car to transport track ballast, 750 mm (2 ft 5 1/2 in) gauge

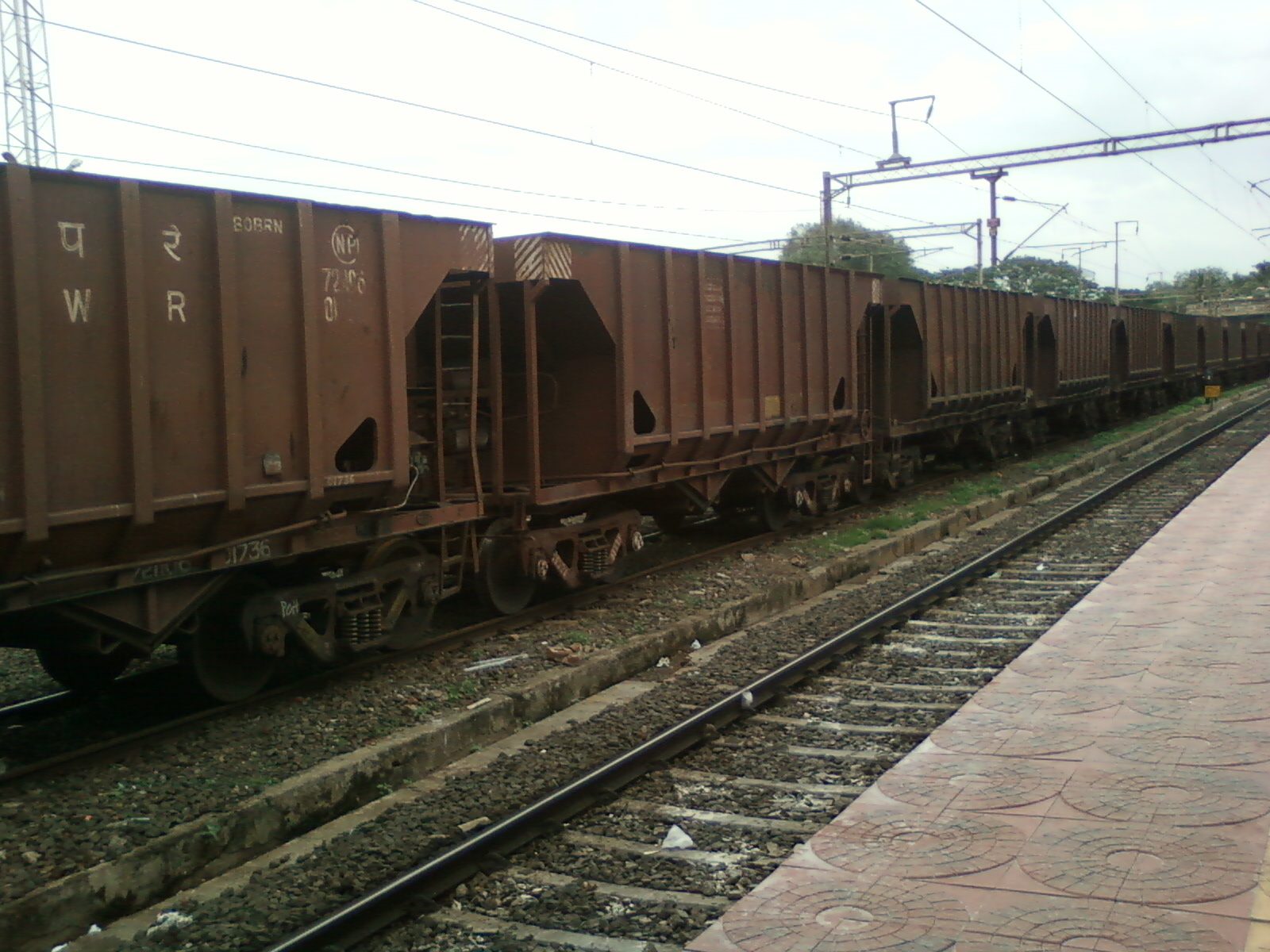
BOBRN class hopper cars freight rakes used by Indian Railways

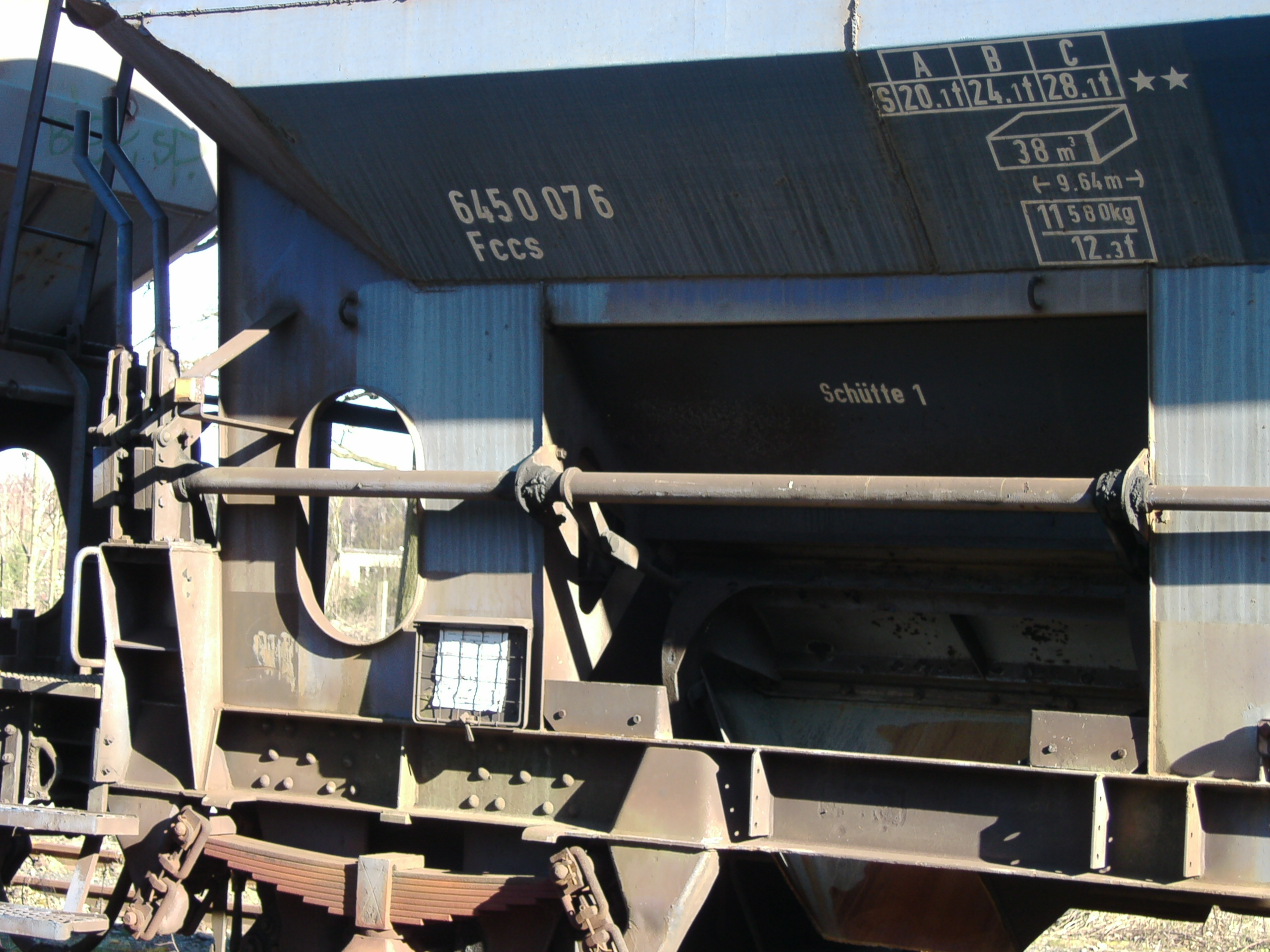
Unloading mechanism of a German hopper car
North American hopper cars

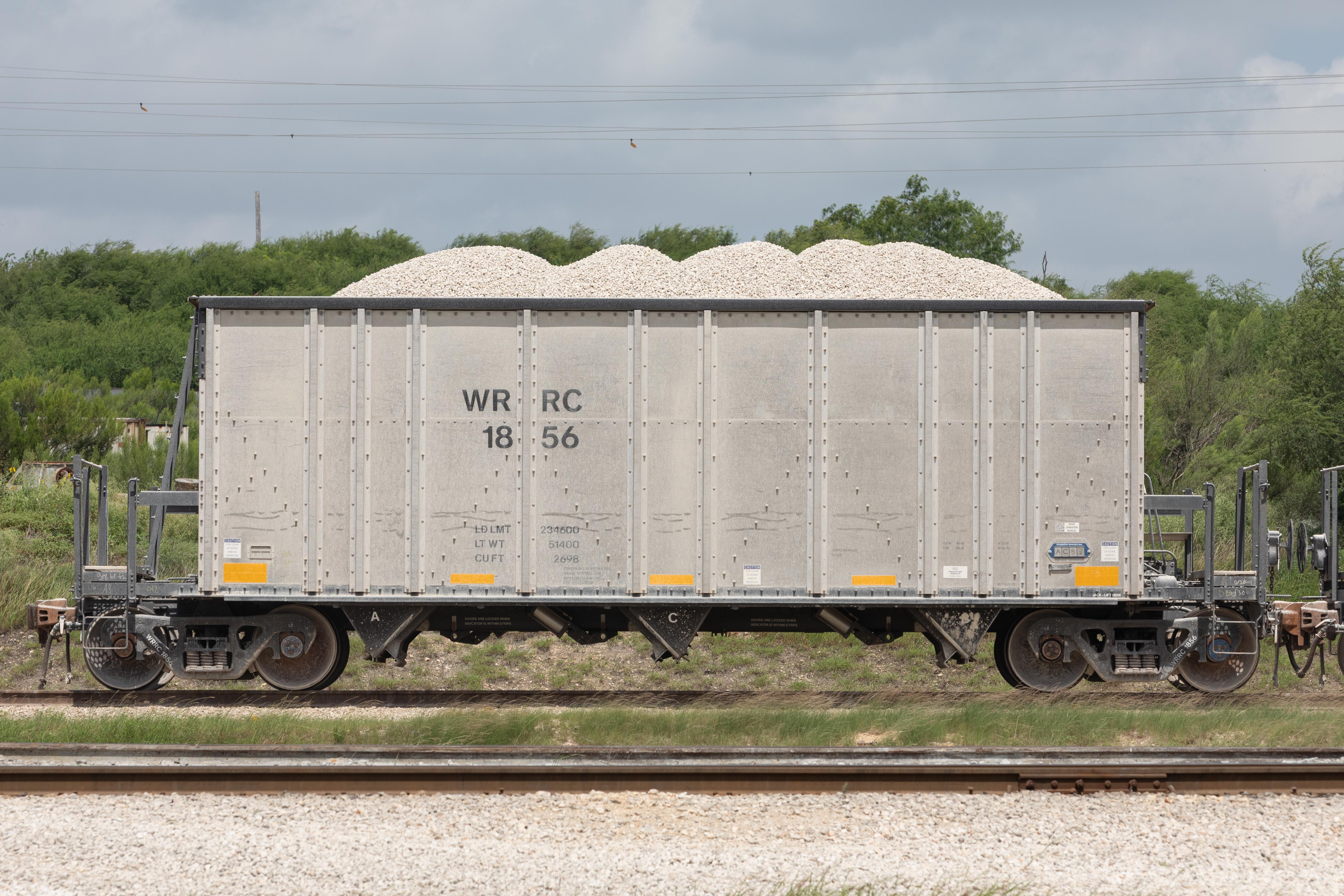
A Western Rail Road aggregate hopper used for the transport of limestone.

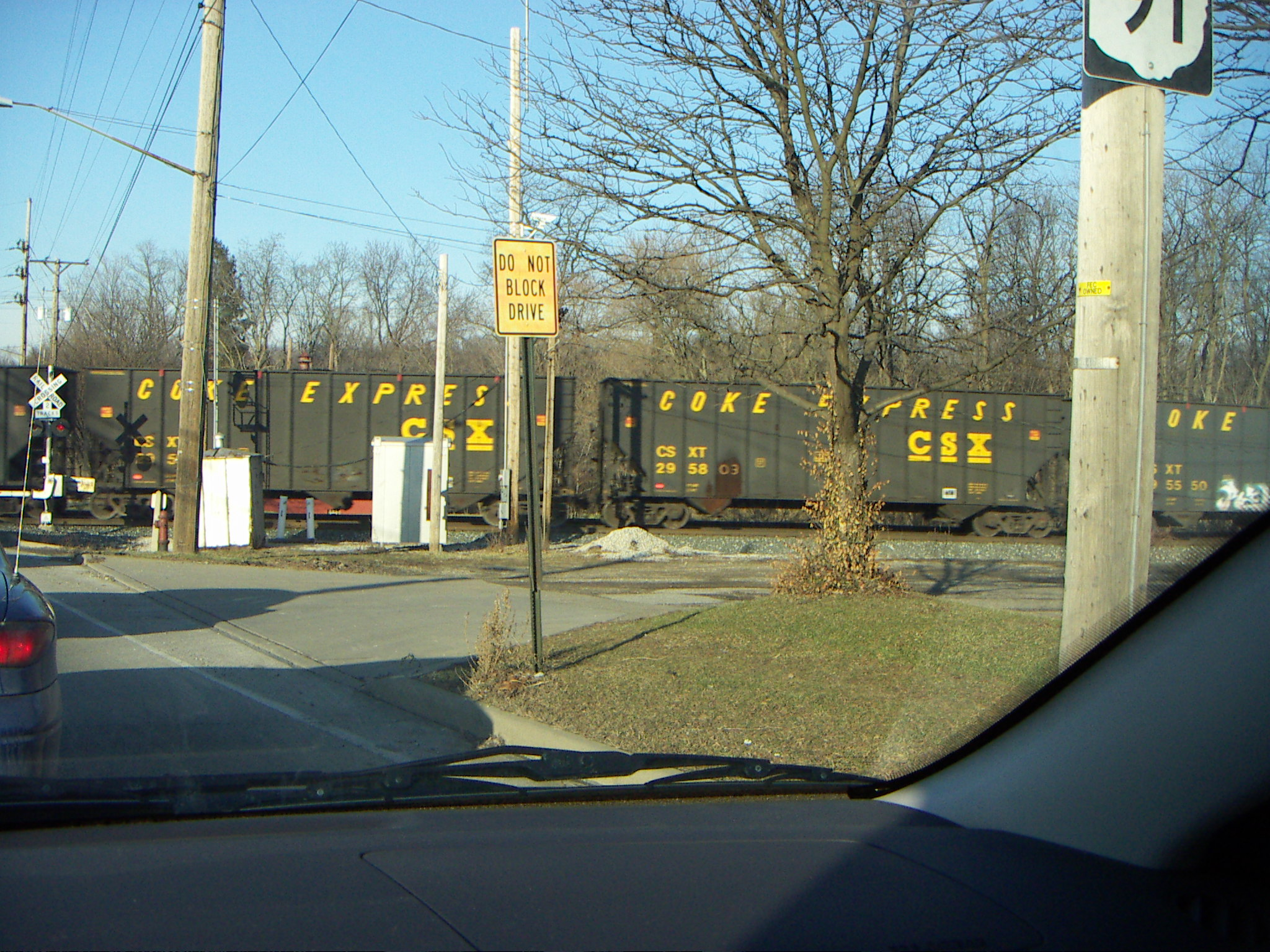
The Coke Express rolls through a level crossing. Cars display both the CSX logo and the words COKE EXPRESS

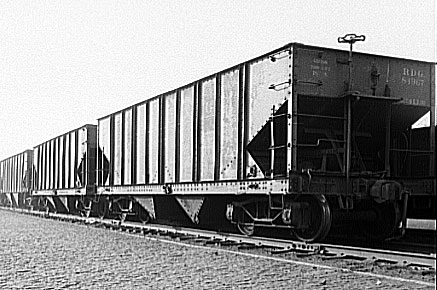
Two-bay hopper cars of the Reading Railroad

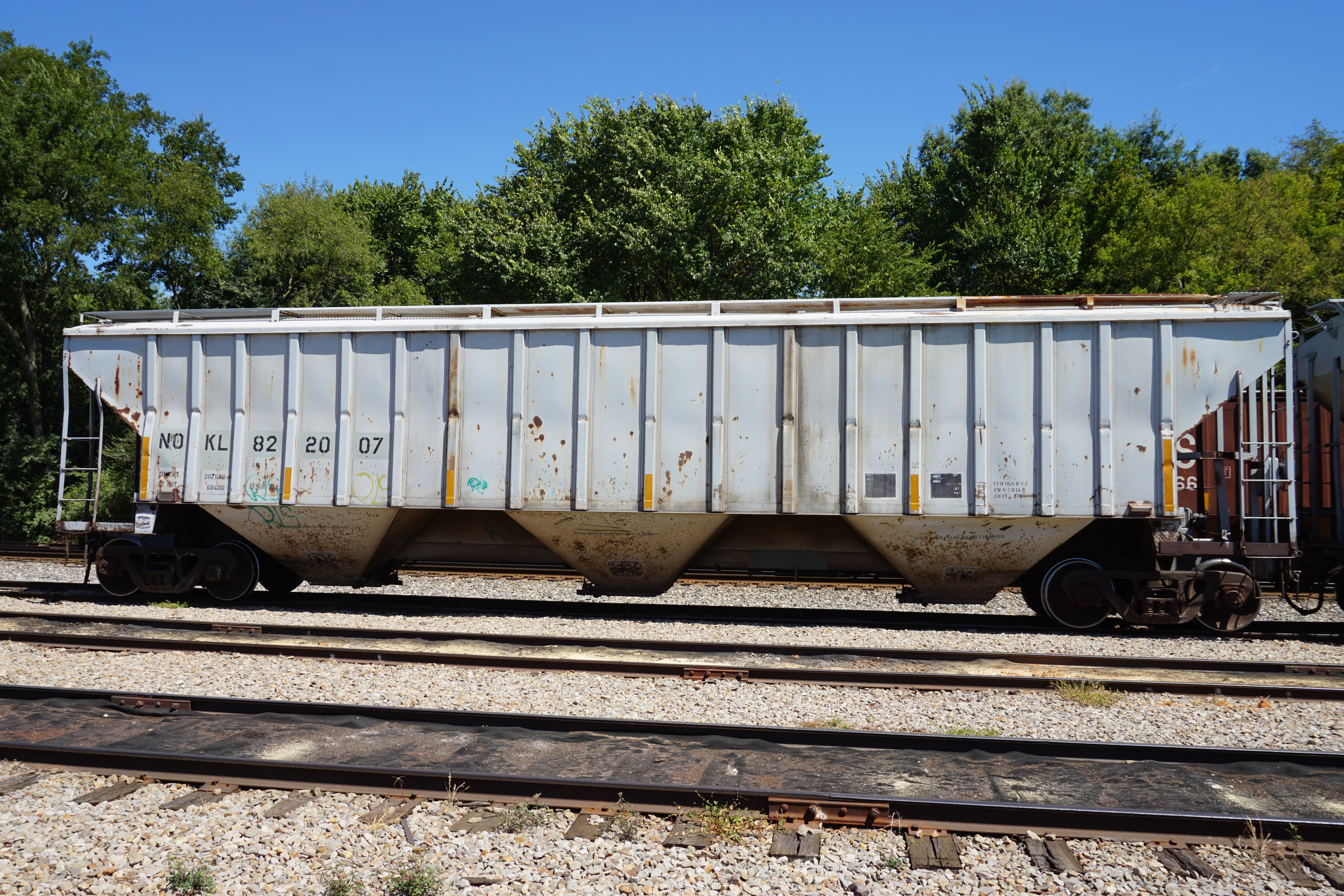
NOKL hopper car at Pittsburg, Texas, in 2015

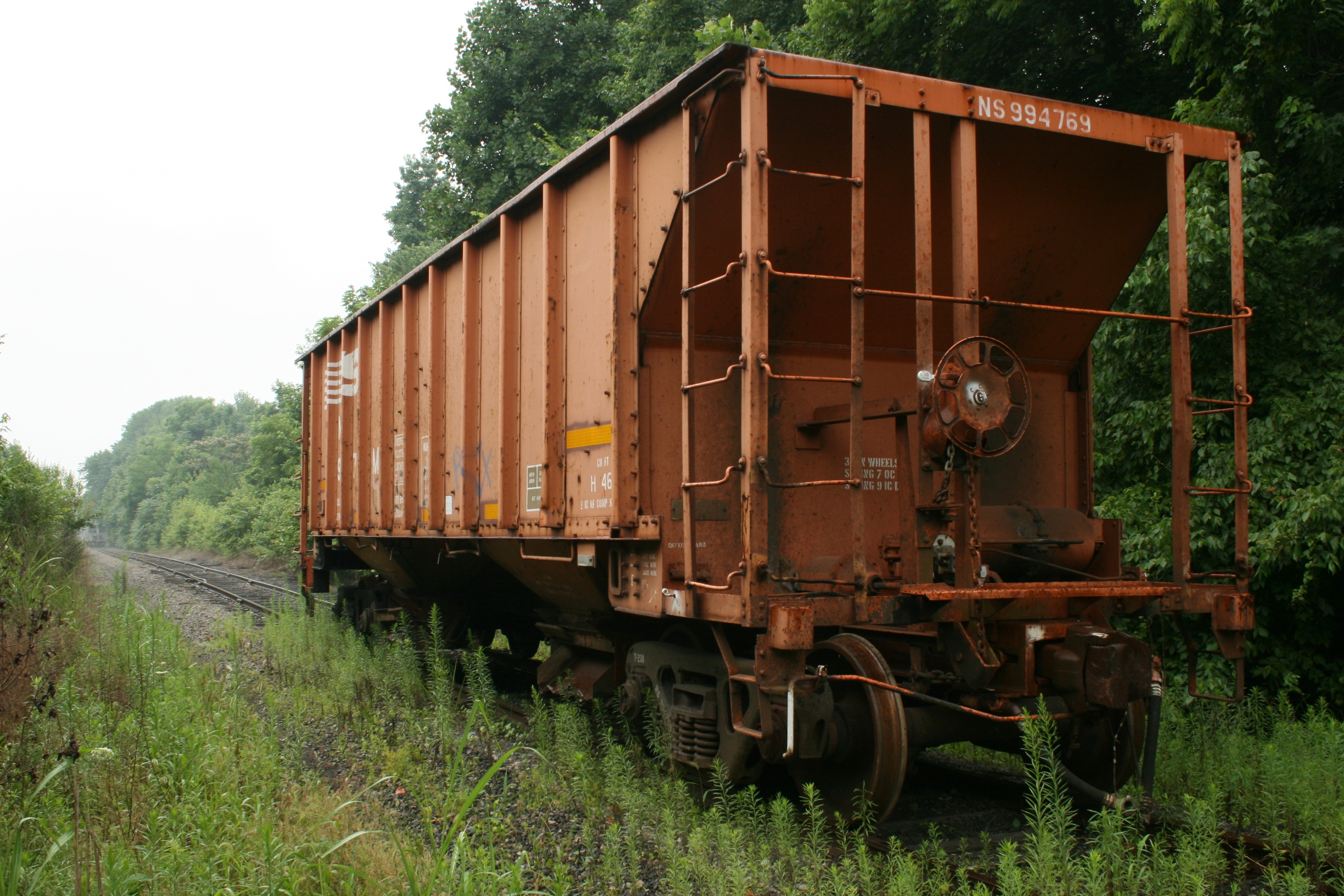
N&W ballast hopper car.

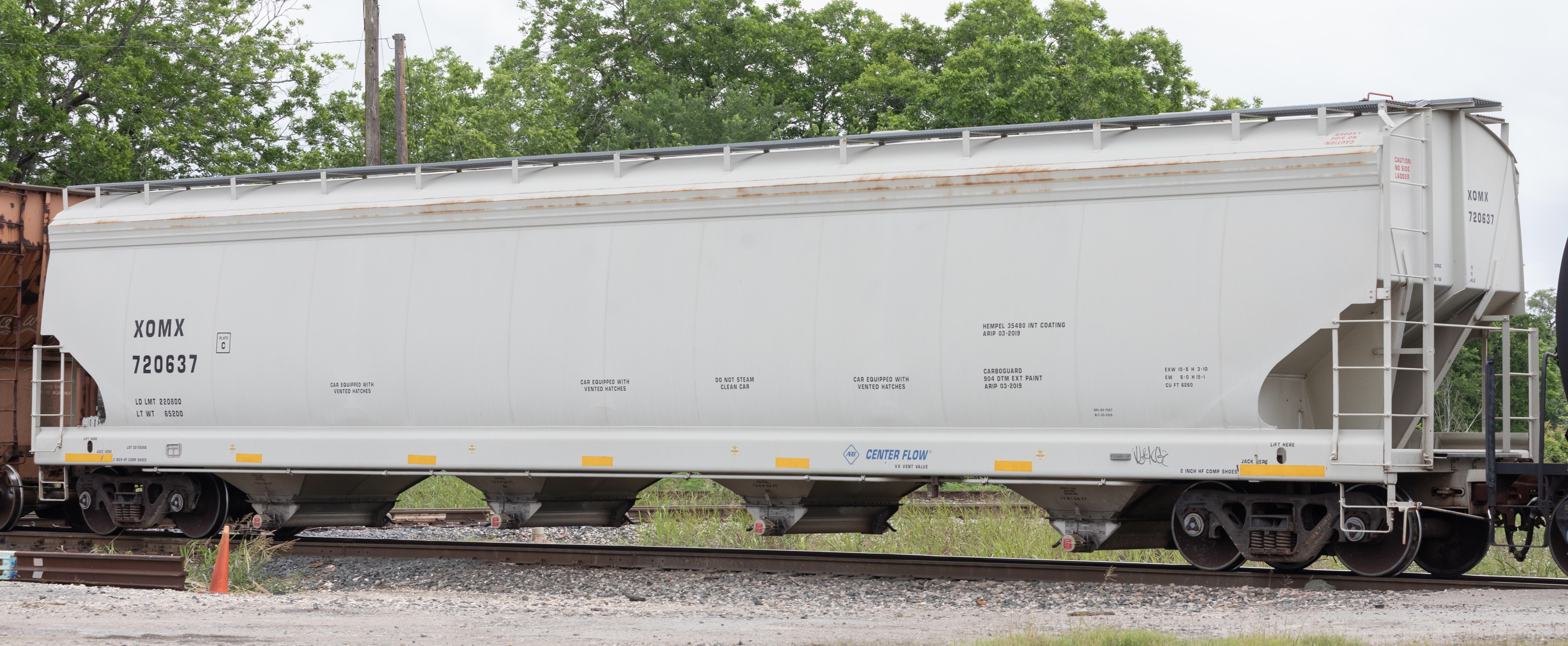
A 4-bay covered hopper car used for the transport of plastic pellets.

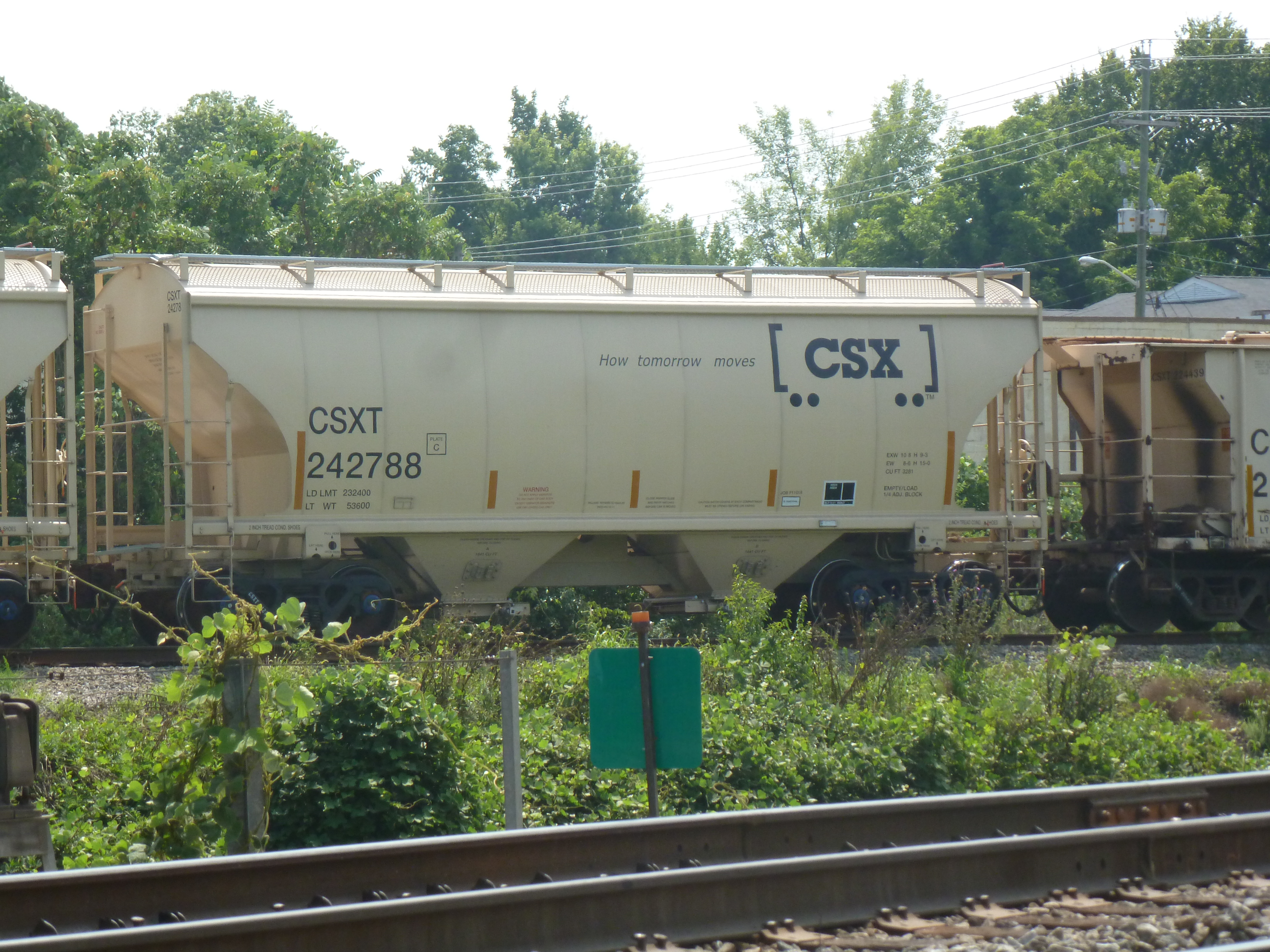
a two-bay through-sill CSX covered hopper

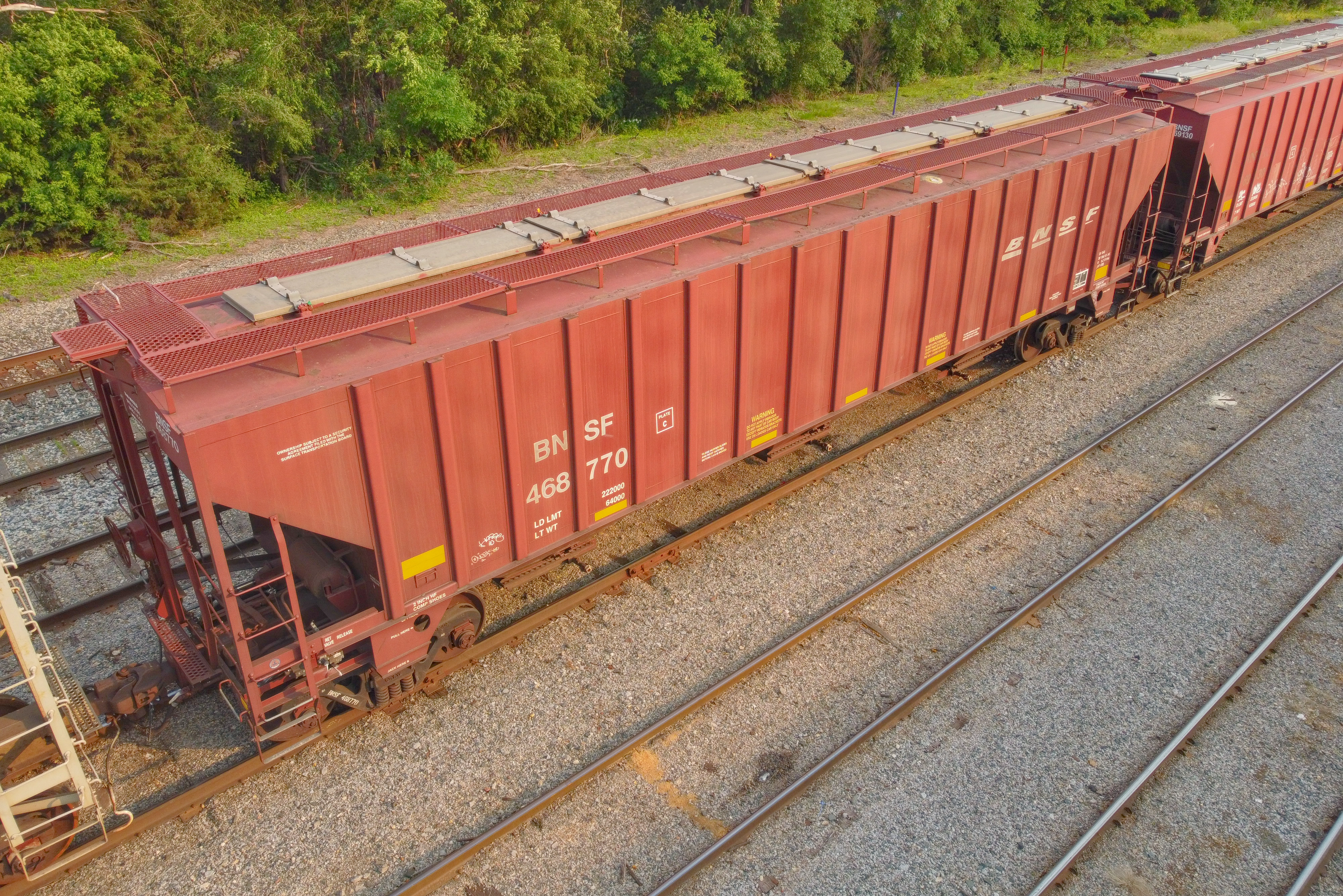
Covered hopper grain car

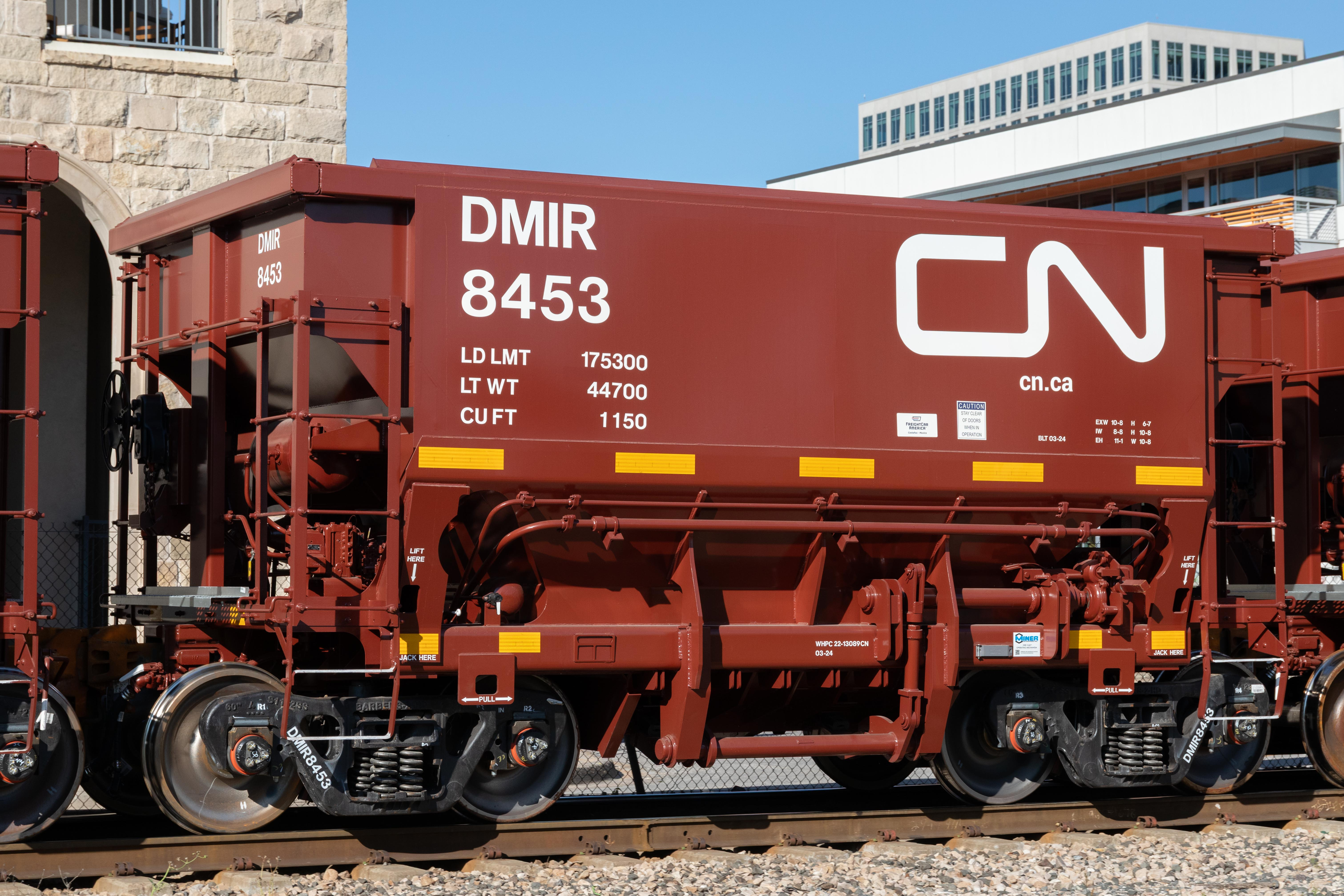
A rapid discharge hopper car used for the transport of iron ore.

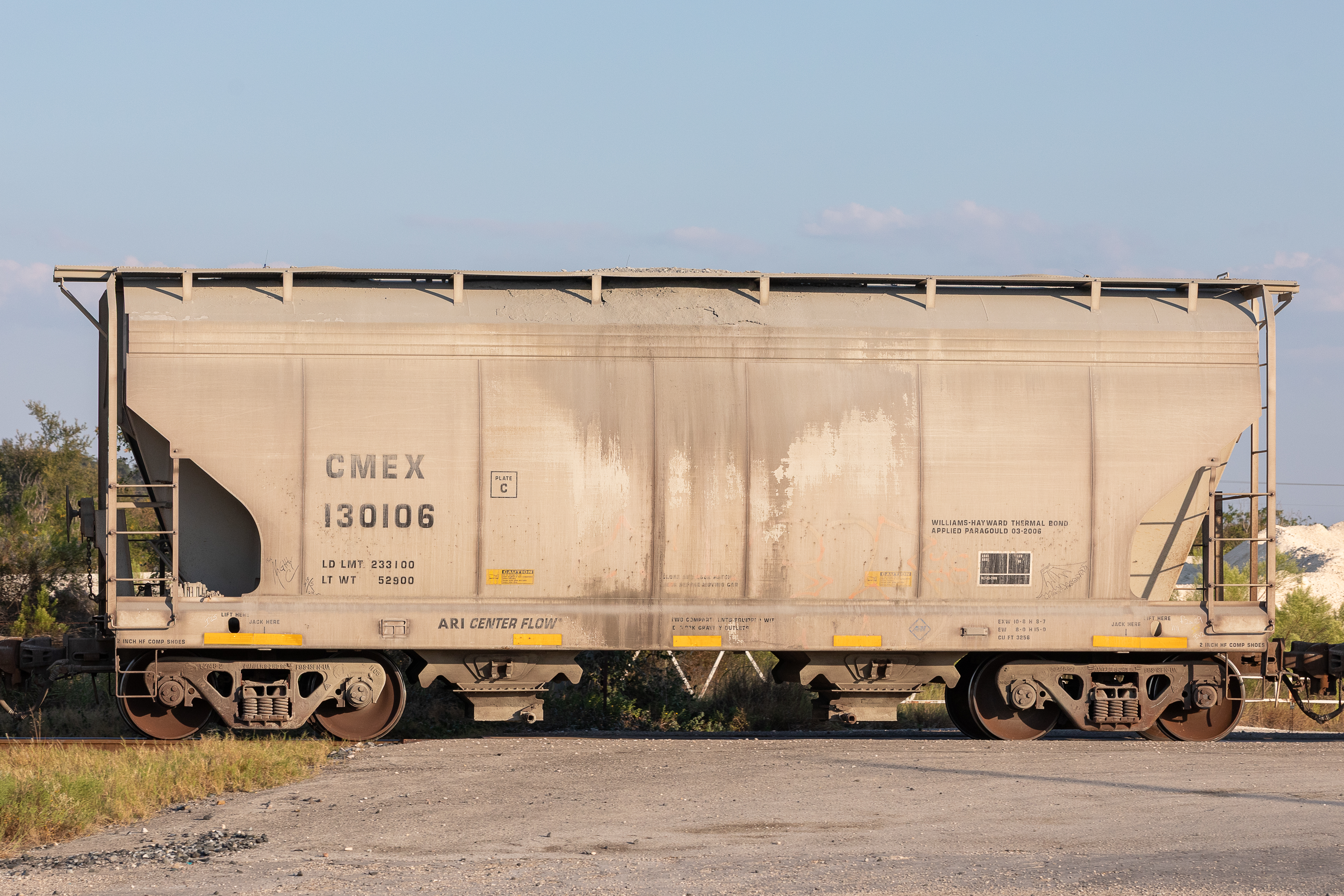
A 2-bay covered hopper used for the transport of cement

== See also ==
- CDA wagon – British railway freight wagon
- Gravity wagon – Type of hopper that unloads when a door at the bottom of one side is opened, also called a slant wagon
- Hopper barge – Type of barge for bulk cargo
- Victorian Railways hopper wagons – Freight wagons in Australia
