= York Clifton Carriage Sidings =

Former train stabling point in York, North Yorkshire

- Interactive map of York Clifton Carriage Sidings

Location
- Location: York, North Yorkshire
- Coordinates: 53.9625°N 1.103°W

Characteristics
- Owner: British Rail
- Depot code: YC (1973 - 1987)
- Type: Diesel

History
- Closed: 1987

York Clifton Carriage Sidings was a stabling point located in York, North Yorkshire, England. The depot was situated on the East Coast Main Line and was near York station.

The depot code was YC.

== History ==
Before its closure in 1987, Class 08 shunters, Class 20, Class 31 and Class 55 locomotives could be seen at the depot.
