= Sulzer Type 2 =

Sulzer Type 2 may refer to:

- British Rail Class 24
- British Rail Class 25
