= Motherwell TMD =

Traction maintenance depot in North Lanarkshire, Scotland

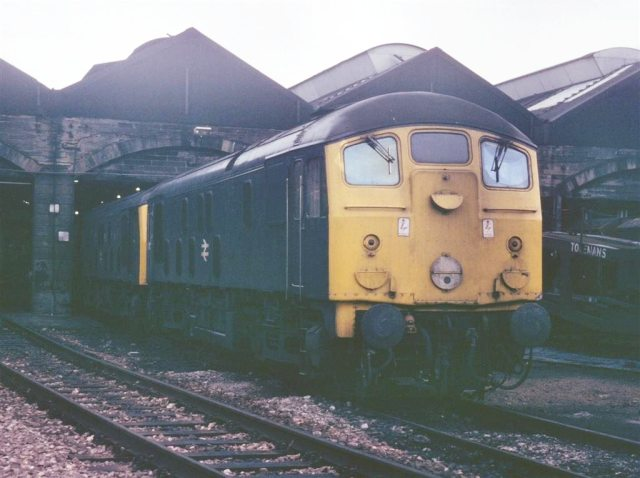
- A Class 24 outside Motherwell Depot
- Interactive map of Motherwell TMD

Location
- Location: Motherwell, Scotland
- Coordinates: 55.7988°N 3.9972°W
- OS grid: NS749579

Characteristics
- Owner: Network Rail
- Operator: Direct Rail Services
- Depot code: ML (1973-)
- Type: Diesel, EMU

History
- BR region: Scottish Region
- Former depot code: 66B (1948-1967)

Motherwell TMD is a traction maintenance depot in Motherwell, Scotland. The depot code is ML.

== History ==
In 1987 the depot had an allocation of Classes 08, 20 and 37 locomotives, and the depot had an Anvil and Hammer logo. Classes 26, 27 and 47 were also usually stabled at the depot.

Following the privatisation of British Rail, the depot was operated by EWS. It closed in 2007, with its operations relocated to nearby Mossend. Following the closure of the depot, the office space was taken over by site owners Network Rail as a new maintenance depot for the Motherwell area.

It was later reopened by Direct Rail Services.
