= British Rail Class 37 =

Class of diesel–electric locomotives

English Electric Type 3 British Rail Class 37
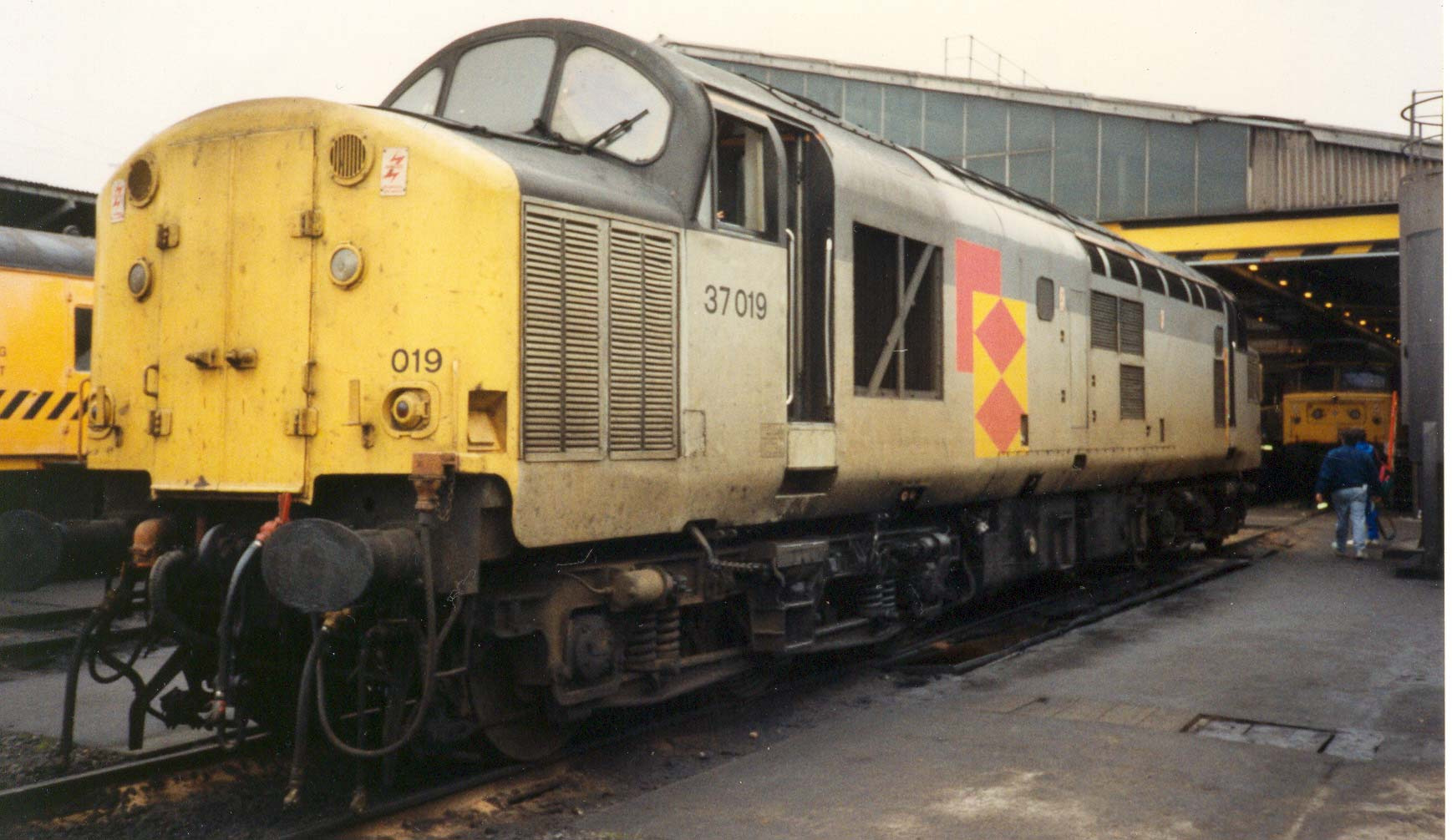
- A Class 37/0 at Tinsley TMD in 1990
Type and origin
- Power type: Diesel–electric
- Builder: English Electric at Vulcan Foundry and Robert Stephenson and Hawthorns
- Build date: 1960–1965
- Total produced: 309
Specifications
- Configuration
  - AAR: C-C
  - UIC: Co′Co′
  - Commonwealth: Co-Co
- Gauge: 4 ft 8 1/2 in (1,435 mm) standard gauge
- Wheel diameter: 3 ft 9 in (1.143 m)
- Minimum curve: 4 chains (80 m)
- Wheelbase: 50 ft 8 in (15.44 m)
- Length: 61 ft 6 in (18.75 m)
- Width: 8 ft 10 1/2 in (2.71 m)
- Height: 12 ft 9 in (3.89 m)
- Loco weight: 100 long tons (102 t; 112 short tons) to 105 long tons (107 t; 118 short tons) except 37/7 and 37/9 class – ballasted to 120 long tons (122 t; 134 short tons)
- Fuel type: Diesel
- Fuel capacity: 890 imp gal (4,000 L; 1,070 US gal) increased to 1,690 imp gal (7,700 L; 2,030 US gal) on rebuild
- Lubricant cap.: 120 imp gal (550 L)
- Water cap.: 160 imp gal (730 L)
- Prime mover: Built: English Electric 12CSVT; 37/9: Mirrlees Blackstone MB275Tt or Ruston RK270Tt
- Engine type: V12 Diesel Engine
- Aspiration: Turbocharger
- Alternator: Main: Brush BA10005A (37/4, 37/5, 37/6, 37/7 and 37/9) or GEC G564AZ (37/7)[3]Aux: Brush BA606A (37/4, 37/5, 37/6, 37/7 and 37/9)[3] ETS: Brush BAH701 (37/4)[3]
- Generator: Original: Main: English Electric EE822, Aux EE911/5C; Rebuilt locos: Main: Brush BA1005A alternator, Aux: Brush BA606A
- Traction motors: English Electric DC traction motors
- Cylinder size: 10 in × 12 in (250 mm × 300 mm) (bore × stroke)
- Transmission: Diesel electric
- MU working: ★ Blue Star
- Train heating: 37/0: Steam; 37/4: Electric Train Heat; Remainder: None
- Loco brake: Vacuum, Air, Dual
- Train brakes: Vacuum, Dual, or Air
- Safety systems: AWS
Performance figures
- Maximum speed: 90 mph (145 km/h) or 80 mph (130 km/h) with regeared CP7 bogies.
- Power output: Engine: 1,750 bhp (1,305 kW)
- Tractive effort: Maximum: 55,500 lbf (247 kN); Continuous: 35,000 lbf (156 kN) @13.6 mph (22 km/h)
- Brakeforce: 50 long tons-force (498 kN)
Career
- Operators: British Rail; Colas Rail; EWS; Direct Rail Services; West Coast Railways; Europhoenix; Rail Operations Group; Locomotive Services Limited
- Numbers: D6700–D6999, D6600–D6608; later 37001–37308
- Nicknames: Tractor, also Syphon, Growler or Slugs
- Axle load class: Route availability 5 except subclass 37/7 RA 7
- Withdrawn: 1966–present
- Disposition: 35 preserved, 66 still in service, 1 rebuilt as Class 23, remainder scrapped

The British Rail Class 37 is a diesel–electric locomotive. Also known as the English Electric Type 3, the class was ordered as part of the British Rail modernisation plan. They were originally numbered in two series, D6600–D6608 and D6700–D6999.

Built in the early 1960s, the Class 37 became a familiar sight on many parts of the British Rail network, in particular forming the main motive power for InterCity services in East Anglia and within Scotland. They also performed well on secondary and inter-regional services for many years. Many are still in use today on freight, maintenance, and empty stock movement duties. The Class 37s are known to some railway enthusiasts as "tractors", a nickname given due to the similarities between the sound of the Class 37's engine and that of a tractor.

== Description ==
=== Background ===
As part of the mass dieselisation brought about by the British Rail modernisation plan a need was identified for a number of type 3 locomotives with a power output of 1,500 hp (1,100 kW) to 1,999 hp (1,491 kW). English Electric had already been successful with orders for type 1 and type 4 diesels and had produced locomotives of similar power for railways in East Africa. A design based on the exported locomotives was put forward and accepted. The design was for a general purpose locomotive and initially found service in British Rail's Eastern Region.

=== Building ===
D6712 in BR green livery in 1963

There was no prototype; British Railways placed an order for forty-two Class 37 locomotives in January 1959. The first was delivered in November 1960; it entered service on 2 December. BR had ordered further Class 37s before the last of the original batch had been completed in mid-1962. The final locomotive was delivered to the Western Region on 9 November 1965. English Electric split the construction between Vulcan Foundry at Newton-le-Willows, and Robert Stephenson and Hawthorns of Darlington. The 309 locomotives produced in total were originally numbered in the range D6700–D6999 and D6600–D6608. The bodywork bears a strong family resemblance to other English Electric designs such as the Class 40 and Class 23 Baby Deltic. Vehicles from D6819 were built without nose-end doors and the headcode display was changed from a split pair of boxes to a panel on the centre of the nose.

Seven orders were placed with English Electric, as follows:

EE order no.	Date	Total	Numbers	Works
CCL 1031	27 January 1959	42	D6700–41	Vulcan Foundry
CCM 1114	5 February 1960	37	D6742–68	Vulcan Foundry
CCM 1114	5 February 1960	37	D6769–78	Robert Stephenson and Hawthorns
CCN 1239	27 April 1961	17	D6779–95	Robert Stephenson and Hawthorns
CCP 1267	13 December 1961	23	D6796–6818	Vulcan Foundry
CCP 1304	July 1962	100	D6819–28, D6859–68, D6879–98	Robert Stephenson and Hawthorns
CCP 1304	July 1962	100	D6829–58, D6869–78, D6899–6918	Vulcan Foundry
CCR 1320	January 1964	20	D6919–38	Vulcan Foundry
CCS 1362	February 1964	70	D6939–99, D6600–8	Vulcan Foundry

=== Duties ===
Distribution of locomotives, March 1974
British Rail Class 37 is located in England
Code	Name	Quantity
CF	Cardiff Canton	51
ED	Eastfield	19
GD	Gateshead	28
HM	Healey Mills	9
IM	Immingham	16
LE	Landore	47
MR	March	29
SF	Stratford	27
TE	Thornaby	50
TI	Tinsley	32
Withdrawn (1966)		1
Total built:		309

The class was designed for freight work and to haul passenger trains on secondary routes and as such the gearing was kept low. Many of the original locomotives were fitted with boilers for steam heating. D6700–6754 were fitted with boilers from new, along with D6758, D6775, D6781–D6818, D6875–D6892. D6960–6968 received boilers from D6701–6709 during 1967/68. 37247 was fitted with a boiler in 1977. With the withdrawal of many Type 2 and Type 3 locomotives in the 1980s the 37s were selected as the standard Type 3 and many of the fleet were given a heavy overhaul to prolong their life into the 1990s and beyond. Some were fitted with electrical train heating (ETH) equipment in the 1980s to become the 37/4 sub-class, initially for use on the West Highland Line, the Welsh Marches line and South Wales–Bristol area services and Far North Lines but later seeing use in north/mid Wales and occasionally the West Country. In 2010, they were used on passenger services on the Cumbrian Coast Line and Wherry lines.

=== High speed trial ===
In 1965 the Western Region undertook some trials using a pair of Class 37s to operate express passenger trains at up to 100 miles per hour (160 km/h). These were successful enough for some such running to continue and diagrams using this combination operated between Paddington and Bristol Temple Meads until 1967. However it was found that there was excessive wear due to constant high-speed running and this resulted in the cessation of these turns.

=== Rebuilding ===
A number of locomotives were rebuilt as Class 37/9s in the late 1980s to evaluate Mirrlees and Ruston engines for possible use on a new Class 38 freight locomotive. These locos were heavily ballasted to improve traction and had excellent load-hauling capabilities, but the Class 38, understood to be a 'modular' locomotive based on the approach that gave rise to the Class 58 diesel loco and the proposed Class 88 electric loco, was never built.

=== Axle load ===
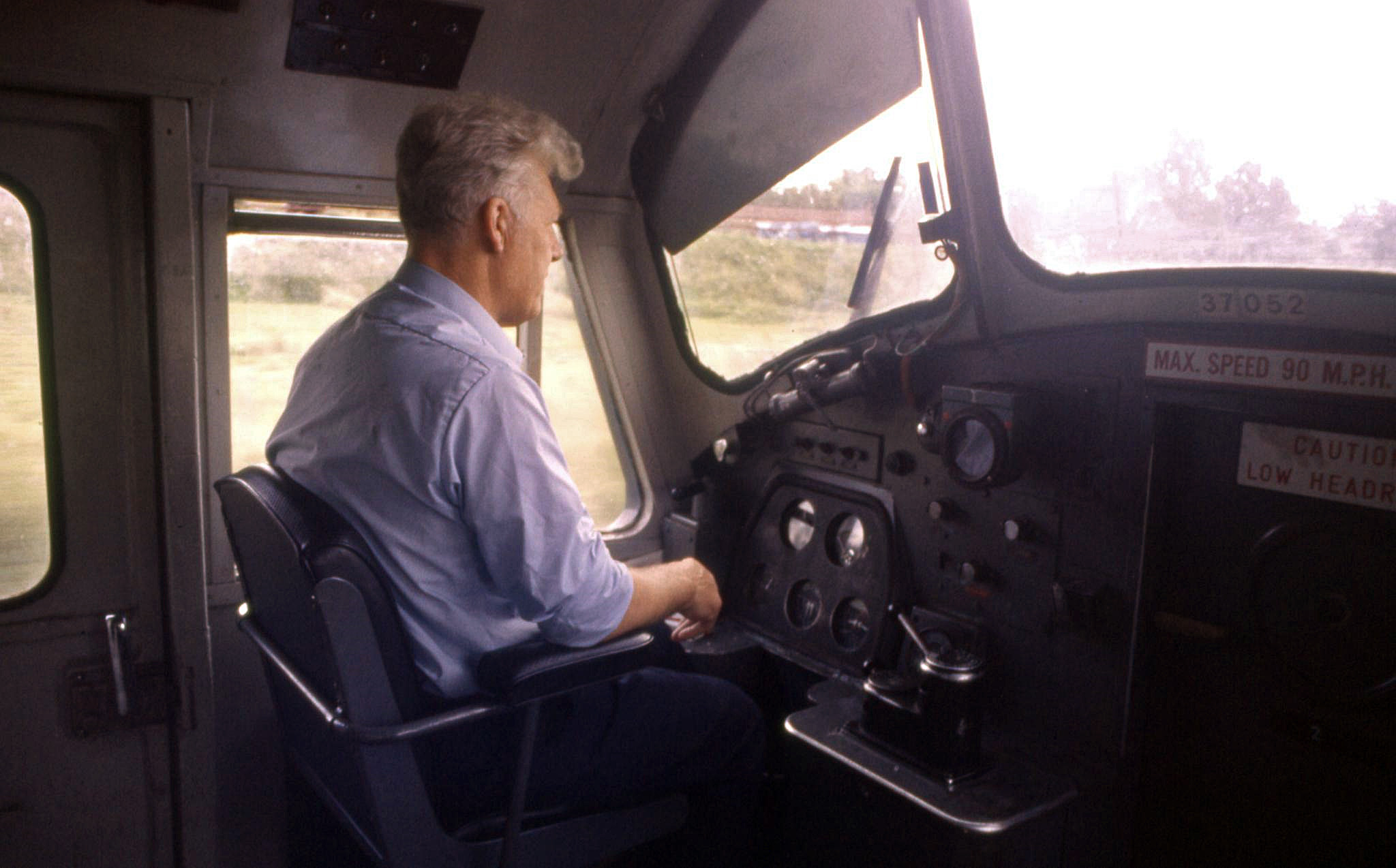
Cab interior of loco no. 37052

The Class 37 has a relatively low axle loading for its size and power. With the withdrawal of most of the smaller types of diesel locomotive, this left it as the only mainline type available in significant numbers for lines with weight restrictions, and for a number of years 37s handled almost all locomotive-hauled services on the West Highland Line, the lines north of Inverness (the Far North and Kyle lines) and in parts of Wales. The Class 37 has Route Availability 5 and this is one of the main reasons it is still in use on the network. Note that class 37/7 and 37/9 have an RA of 7 due to their extra ballast weights.

=== Regional variations ===
There are several differences between particular locomotives, some of them easily seen. Western Region Class 37s can be identified by 'cow horns' around halfway up on the outer edge of each end of the lamp brackets. When British Railways took over from the Great Western Railway the use of Great Western lamps continued. Their brackets used an L-shaped upright that was parallel to the direction of travel, unlike the other regions which used transverse brackets.

From the late 1970s some Western Region Class 37s were fitted with additional brackets on the nose to mount an additional headlight for use on the Heart of Wales line.

Another difference between the regions is by the nose end headcodes. Lower-numbered, split-box Class 37s were allocated to northern England and east Anglia; centre-box locomotives were almost all allocated to Wales and the south west. After locomotives were transferred between pools in the 1980s they tended to stray from their original depots.

Regional decorations included the Highland (Inverness) Stag, the Cockney Sparrow (Stratford) the Cornish lizard (St Blazey) and Eastfield Highland Terrier. All the Cardiff Canton Class 37/4s received Celtic Dragons below the driver's window whilst in large logo blue. Some Scottish locomotives were later fitted with small Saltire flags by their TOPS data panels or on their noses in a similar fashion to the HAA hoppers allocated to Scottish power stations.

=== British Rail liveries ===
On delivery, the Class 37s were painted in plain green with a grey roof, the 'late' (post-1956) British Railways crest and a D prefix to their running number. Some locomotives were delivered as the small yellow warning panel was introduced, earlier locomotives being given these panels during works visits. Towards the late 1960s, the yellow was extended to the full height of the nose.

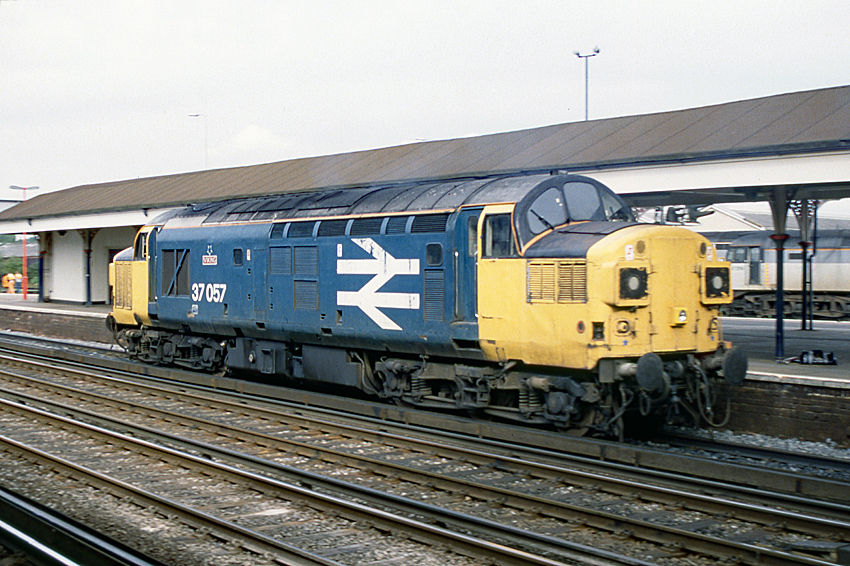
37057 Viking in BR 'Large Logo' blue livery at Eastleigh, 1992

By the 1970s, all locomotives had received all over British Rail blue with a full yellow nose; by 1975 most locomotives had also received their TOPS numbers. Their livery remained the same until the early 1980s when 'Large Logo blue' was introduced. This entailed the yellow nose continuing round to behind the driver's door and up to the top of the windscreen and a full height 'double arrow' logo. These locomotives had the top of the nose painted black to lower the risk of the driver being dazzled by the sun. Freight-allocated examples received a similar livery – the only difference being the blue was replaced by freight grey. In 1987, the Sectors were launched, incorporating a new livery of 'three tone grey'; a light grey lower bodyside, medium grey cantrail and a dark grey roof, along with a bright Sector logo (Coal, Metals, Petroleum, Distribution, General and Construction). In addition a metal double arrow logo was fitted. This livery co-existed with plain blue, large logo blue/grey and the new InterCity and Regional Railways liveries right up to the end of British Rail in 1996.

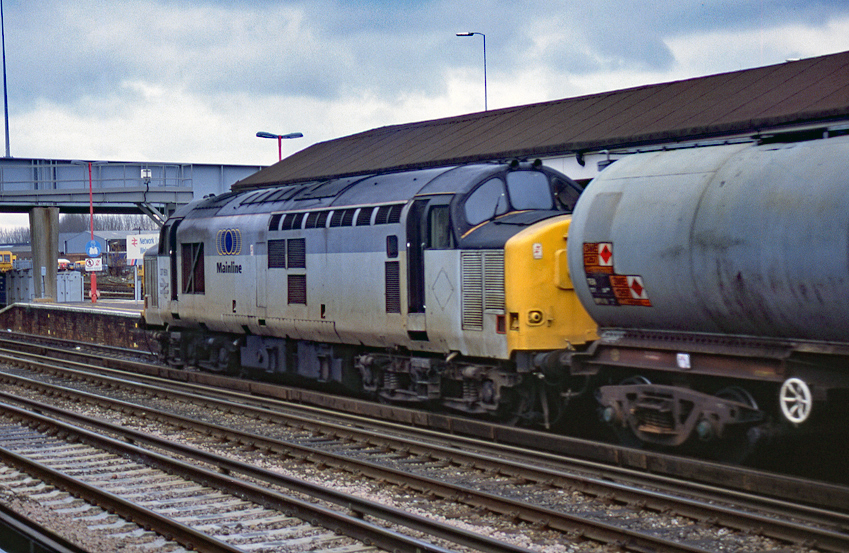
37891 with Mainline Freight branding at Eastleigh, 1995

Some locomotives in the 'sectorised company' pools received Transrail Freight logos or Mainline Freight 'Rolling Balls' over their triple grey colours, while Loadhaul locomotives were painted orange and black and Mainline locomotives received 'aircraft' blue with silver stripes. Departmental locomotives were initially painted in a plain grey livery, but this didn't find favour and was modified into 'Dutch' grey and yellow livery, similar to that of Nederlandse Spoorwegen. Locomotive 37093 was mocked up as a "police" locomotive which pulled over a Class 43 HST power car for speeding in an InterCity 125 advert broadcast in the 1980s.

== TOPS renumbering ==
As with many diesel classes, the TOPS renumbering was implemented in a straightforward manner, with the locomotive numbers remaining in sequence; thus D6701 became 37001, D6999 became 37299 and D6600–D6608 became 37300–37308. The remaining locomotive, D6700, became 37119 instead of D6819, which became 37283; the number was unused as D6983 was destroyed in an accident in 1965. As members of the class were altered later in their careers, they were renumbered, some more than once.

D6983 was withdrawn in October 1966 following a fatal collision in December 1965 with a derailed Class 47, D1671 THOR, near Bridgend in South Wales; this was caused by a landslip. D6983 was the first EE Type 3 to be withdrawn and, as a result, the only locomotive in the entire class not to receive a TOPS number. The remains of both locomotives were sold to local scrap merchants, R.S. Hayes, and cut up on site during October 1966.

== Sub-classes ==
In the 1980s the Class 37 locomotives were extensively refurbished – from that point 37/0 refers to the original version. The work took place at British Rail Engineering's Crewe Works except for the 37/3 subclass whose bogies were replaced at various depots.

Sub-class	Description
37/0	Locomotives which remained unmodified after other sub-classes were created
37/3	Locomotives which were rebogied but not refurbished
37/4	Refurbished, rewired, English Electric generator replaced with Brush alternator, electric train supply (ETS) fitted
37/5	Refurbished, rewired, English Electric generator replaced with Brush Traction alternator
37/6	Locomotives from Class 37/5 further modified with through ETS wiring and RCH jumper cables
37/7	Refurbished, rewired, English Electric generator replaced with GEC G564AZ or Brush alternator, additional weight added
37/9	Refurbished, rewired, English Electric generator replaced with Brush alternator, new engines: Mirrlees MB275Tt or Ruston RK270Tt

=== Class 37/0 ===
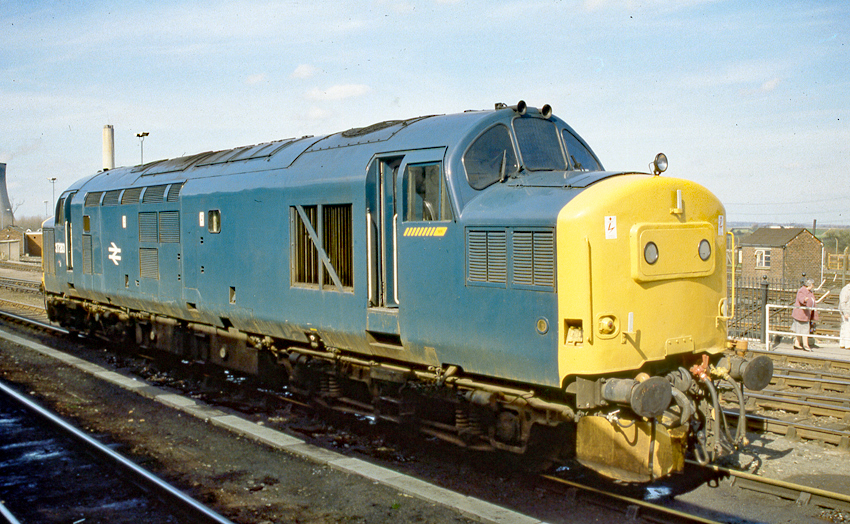
37263 at Didcot

This designation covered all 309 locomotives as built, but with such a large number of locomotives and with two companies involved in the building, there were several differences within this sub-class alone. The most visible external difference was that the first 119 locos (originally) had a "split" headcode box; for these locos the four digit train reporting number was shown in two square boxes, each containing two digits and separated by a pair of connecting doors, designed to allow the train crew to be exchanged while in motion. Later locomotives had a single centrally placed headcode box and also had the horns mounted on the roof, rather than built into the nose of the locomotive. This difference was the reason for the double change in numbers (involving D6700 and D6819) when implementing the TOPS scheme described earlier.

From the mid-1970s onwards some locomotives that had been built with steam heating boilers and where these were not longer used had the associated water tank converted for use as an additional fuel tank, extending the fuel capacity to 1,750 imperial gallons (8,000 L).

=== Class 37/3 ===
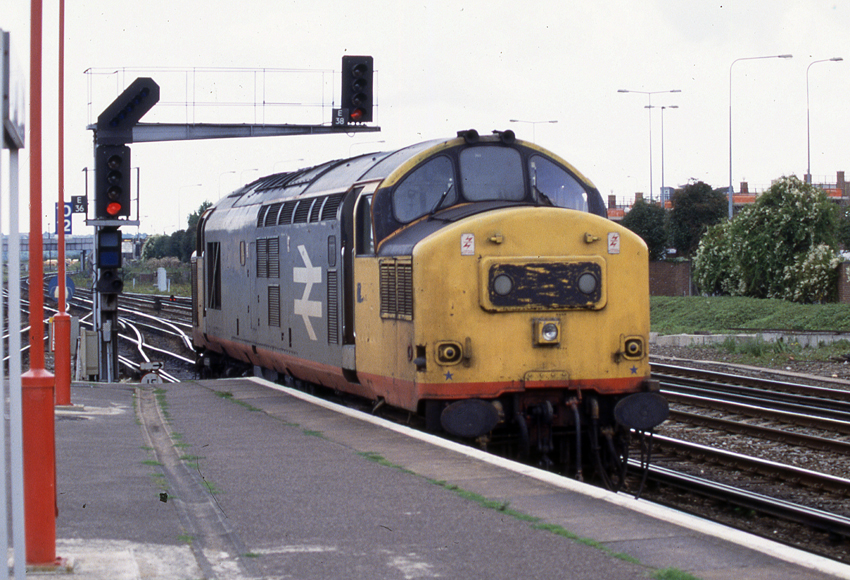
37371 at Eastleigh

There were two incarnations of a 37/3 subclass. The first was a group of 12 Motherwell allocated locos that were fitted with strengthened couplings and modified brake blocks for working the heavy trains to Ravenscraig. These were all renumbered back to their original numbers by the end of 1988. Starting in 1979 triple-heading on iron ore hoppers between Port Talbot and Llanwern in South Wales commenced, typically using locomotives in the range 37 299-37 308.

The second set of locos were rebogied at various depots with the regeared cast frame type 'CP7 Bogie'. Bogies from the English Electric Class 55 Deltics, Class 50 and Class 37s are largely interchangeable with only modification to traction motor gearing, to 80 miles per hour (130 km/h) in the case of the 37s, and access step positions needing alteration between the classes. The fuel capacity was doubled by using the redundant train heating boiler water tanks but no other changes were made.

=== Class 37/4 ===
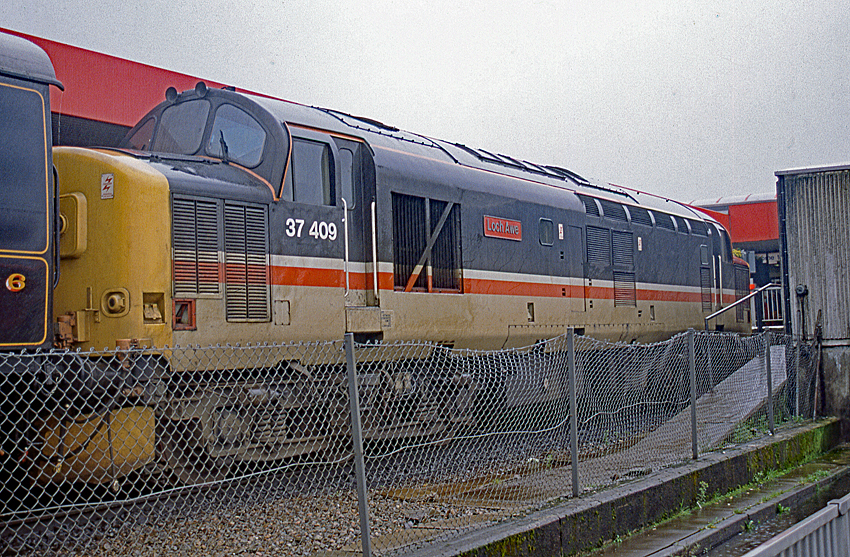
BR Class 37/4 37409 Loch Awe at Fort William in 1989

With ETH (Electric Train Heating) replacing 'steam heated' coaches, some of this class received ETH Supply when refurbished at Crewe Works during 1985 and 1986. During this refurbishment, the locomotives also received regeared CP7 bogies and the English Electric generator was replaced with a Brush BA1005A alternator. Extensive re-wiring, as well as a full repaint into BR Large Logo was undertaken. The modifications allowed the rebuilt locomotives to work passenger trains all year round, with the 31 strong fleet being split between Wales and Scotland, Scotland receiving the first 25 and Wales the other six.

After the extensive refurbishment, the locomotives were allocated the 37/4 sub-class, following the trend of renumbering 'ETH' fitted locomotives xx/4s, (e.g. 474xx and 314xx).

The next chapter saw the entire sub-class pass to Transrail Freight, which was one of the three regional freight operating companies prior to the privatisation of the entire British Rail network.

Over the years, the locomotives have received a large number of liveries: BR Green, Regional Railways, Trainload Grey, EWS maroon, Transrail Freight, BR Large Logo and Mainline, to name a few.

The Cambrian, North Wales Coast, Rhymney, West Highland, South Wales and West Country all benefited from the use of 37/4s.

Locomotive hauled operations had virtually ceased by the early 2000s, thanks to the widespread introduction of second-generation diesel multiple units and the replacement of loco hauled trains by multiple units, although the sub-class did hold out on the Cardiff–Rhymney trains for Arriva Trains Wales for some years. 37411 and 37425 were specially painted to mark the end of loco-hauled services on the line, in April 2005, these repaints being funded by Arriva.

In late 2010 DB Schenker put all of its remaining 37/4s up for sale, with many examples expected to be sold for scrap. Direct Rail Services (DRS) subsequently bought most of the remaining class 37/4s, for use on nuclear flask traffic. These later found further use in 2018/19 on Cumbrian Coast passenger services and East Anglian passenger services between Norwich and Great Yarmouth/Lowestoft, allowing for multiple units to be cascaded (in the first instance) and covering for accident damaged units (in the second). Between 2019 and early 2020 Colas Rail hired three Class 37s, including 37418 and 37421, to Transport for Wales for use (once again) on peak hour commuter services on the Rhymney line.

=== Class 37/5 ===
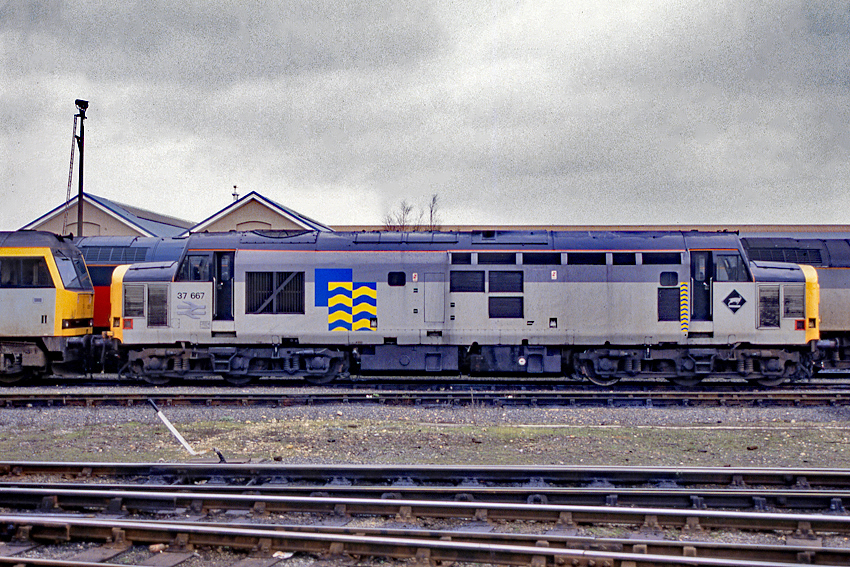
Class 37/5 number 37667 at Eastleigh

This class were updated in similar fashion to the 37/4 subclass, except that they did not receive electric train heating and some were fitted with Sandite ports. Locomotives previously numbered between 37001 and 37119 (those which had split headcode boxes) were given new numbers from 37501 upwards (curtailed at 37521); those previously numbered between 37120 and 37308 were renumbered from 37699 downwards (curtailed at 37667). Nine locomotives from the first batch and three from the second were later modified for use with the aborted Channel Tunnel sleeper Nightstar project, reclassified 37/6 and renumbered 37601–37612 (see below).

=== Class 37/6 ===
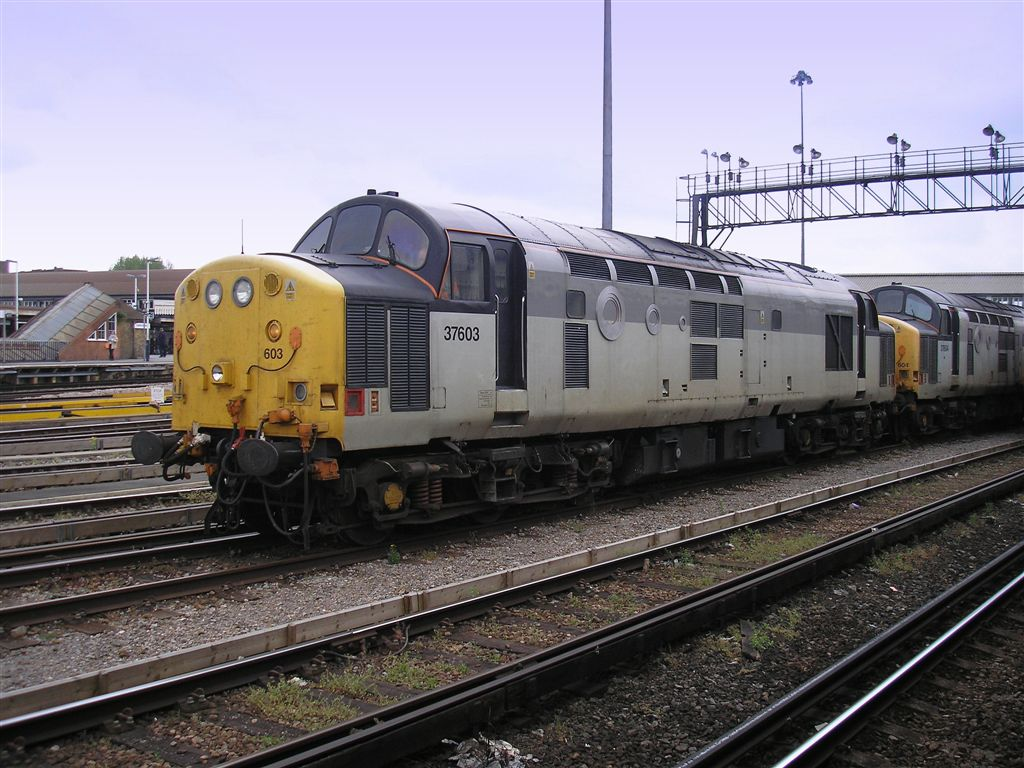
Two Eurostar 37/6 types at Clapham Junction

Eurostar (at the time European Passenger Services) had 12 locomotives modified (all ex-37/5) as Class 37/6, with the intention that they would haul overnight international trains ("Nightstar") over the non-electrified sections of their routes in Britain. However, these services were never introduced, and, in 1997, Eurostar sold six of its locomotives to Direct Rail Services (DRS), with a further three sold in 2000. The remaining three locomotives were retained by Eurostar for a variety of tasks, including driver training, route learning, and for rescuing failed Class 373 units. Once Eurostar moved its operations to its new depot at Temple Mills, its Class 37 locomotives became redundant and they too were sold to DRS in 2007. DRS has subsequently sold some of them, Europhoenix being the principal recipient. The Europhoenix 37/6s are used on test trains and have been used to haul EMUs to and from works and to rail-connected scrapyards.

=== Class 37/7 ===
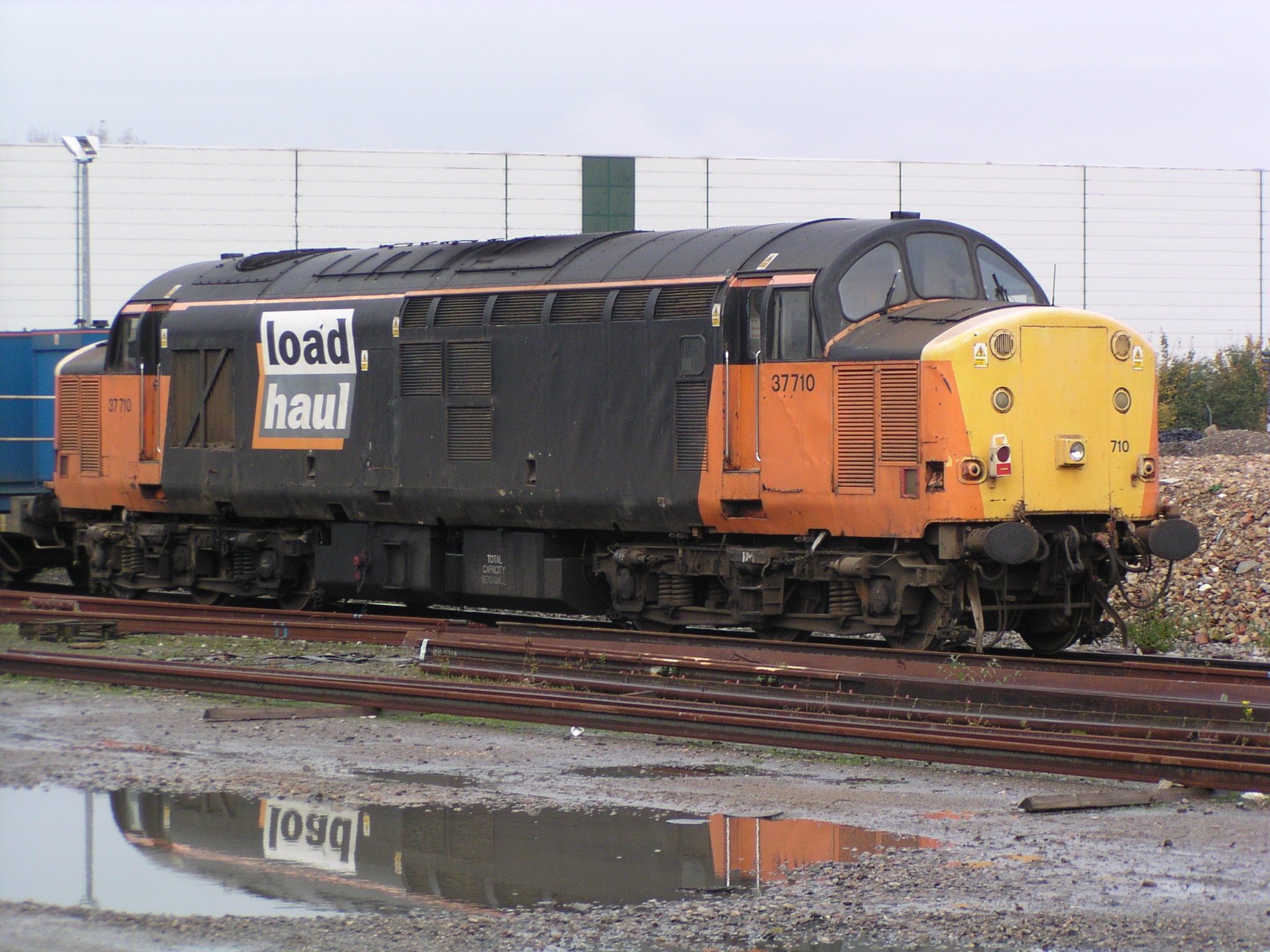
Loadhaul liveried 37/7 type

The Class 37/7 sub-class was intended primarily for heavy freight work, with extra ballast and modified gearing.

As part of the major refurbishment scheme of the Class 37 locomotives in the 1980s, another freight dedicated fleet of 44 Class 37s was created, the Class 37/7 subclass, which was very similar to the 37/5 subclass except for plating over of a bodyside window and the addition of a ballast weight to give extra 'pulling power' when hauling heavy freight trains, such as the metals trains in South Wales. Again, like the 37/5s, there were two batches completed; from phase 1 and phase 2 Class 37/0 locos. The batch numbered 37701 upwards (curtailed at 37719) were from phase 1 build locos and have the flush front ends and nose-mounted horns, whilst the batch numbered from 37899 downwards (curtailed at 37 883) were rebuilds from phase 2 locos, having the central headcode box (plated over) and roof-mounted horns. A further batch was created; locos numbered 37796–37803 had a different type of electrical equipment fitted (from Brush), as part of a trial, and differ from the other locos in the subclass internally.

In British Rail use the sub-class were particularly common in South Wales on heavy coal and metals work. They were particularly adept at working coal trains up and down the short but steeply graded branch lines around Swansea and Cardiff, to collieries such as Tower Colliery, Coedbach and Cwmbargoed. They operated merry-go-round trains of 32-ton HAA air-braked hoppers, usually numbering 32 wagons, between collieries, washeries, open cast mines and disposal points to power stations such as Aberthaw and occasionally further afield.

Their use on Metals Sector trains, usually from Llanwern, Port Talbot or English metal works such as Scunthorpe, saw them hauling very heavy trains between docks, works and purchasers in Britain. Indeed, the use of three Class 37/0 locomotives on Llanwern–Port Talbot Docks steel trains (the heaviest on the British rail network at 3,300 long tons (3,400 t) was soon abandoned when Class 56s became available, requiring only two locomotives. Cardiff had a large allocation of 37/7s, some waiting on standby, ready for a call from the mills requiring more wagons to handle any extra traffic. Eventually this work was taken over by Class 56s and Class 60s. This Metals traffic would also become the domain of the sub-class 37/9, which to all intents and purposes was a 37/7 but with a different prime mover.

When EWS introduced its 250 Class 66s, from 1998, many of the sub-class were put into store. Some have since been involved in construction work in France and Spain building new high-speed lines. A total of 40 were sent to France, 15 to Spain and an additional two were sent to Italy. Most subsequently returned to the UK, although a handful were broken up abroad.

=== Class 37/9 ===
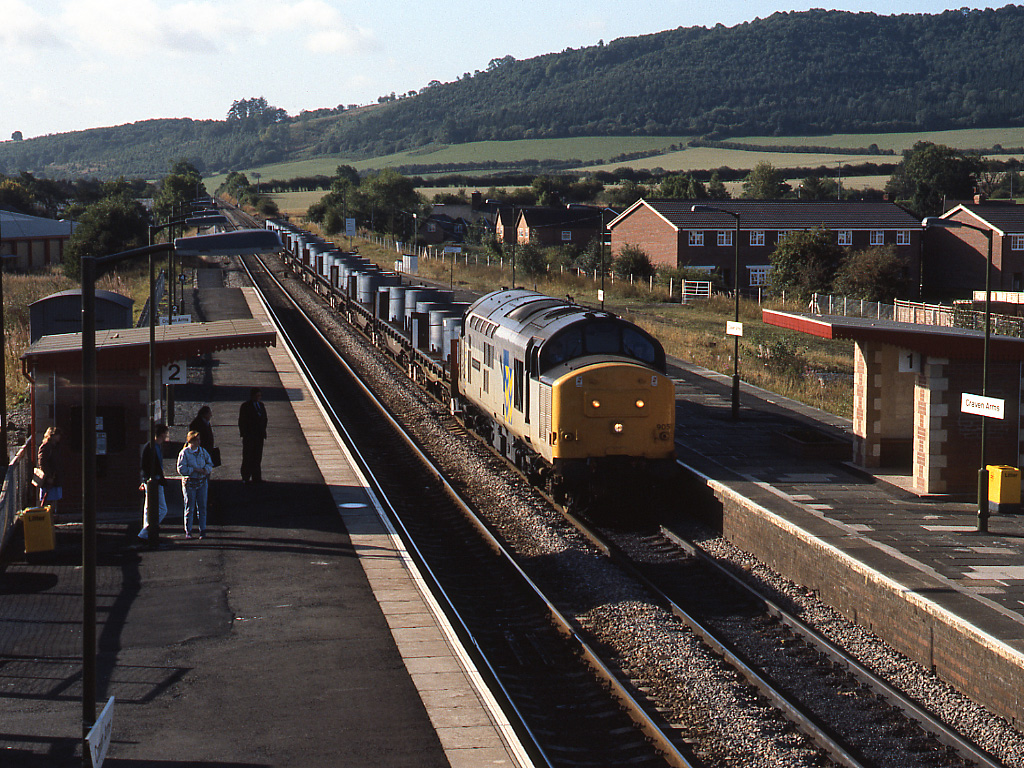
37905 hauls a train of steel coils through Craven Arms station

In 1986, four Class 37s, numbers 37150/148/249/124 respectively, were converted to test the Mirrlees MB275T engine and Brush alternator for the proposed Class 38, and were numbered 37901–904. These were followed in 1987 by 37905/6, converted from 37136/206, which were fitted with the alternative pairing of a Ruston RK270T engine and GEC alternator. All six locomotives were fitted with new bogies, and had ballast weights to increase their overall weight to 120 tons. Although intended as a testbed for the proposed Class 38, the two power units fitted were those considered for the Class 60, which was eventually delivered with an enlarged version of the Mirrlees MB275T. They all had modifications similar to that of Class 37/7, including new nose grilles, removal of the central bodyside windows and 4 fire extinguisher ports. However, 37901-904 had a heavily modified central roof section, consisting of flat panels rather than the curved sheets of the original. All 6 had a new exhaust port fitted, replacing the two of the original design.

All six Class 37/9s were delivered in Railfreight Grey livery, later receiving 3TG metals sub sector livery, and operated as part of the British Rail Heavy Metals sector, being based in South Wales and hauling trains normally rostered for the much more powerful Class 56 such as the Port Talbot Steelworks–Llanwern Iron Ore tipplers. During the late 1990s, use of the Class 37/9s declined due to availability of the newer and more powerful Class 66s and problems maintaining such a small number of non-standard locos, with all six officially designated as being in storage in 1999.

This was not, however, the end of the sub-class. In July 2000, 37906 was designated as part of the EWS heritage fleet but has since been sold into preservation, joining 37901 and 37905. 37902 was sold to Direct Rail Services in 2003, but was scrapped and cut up in 2005 after a review by DRS. 37904 was cut up at CF Booth's in Rotherham in November 2004 and 37 903 was scrapped at Crewe Diesel TMD in April 2005. 37901 has since been sold to Europhoenix and returned to service (complete with its Mirrlees Pioneer name). 37905 was purchased by UK Rail Leasing and is presently stored at its Leicester depot. In October 2019, 37906 Battlefield Line Railway was sold.

== Operations ==
=== British Rail ===
Initially D6700 – D6702 were allocated to Stratford shed and possibly the first use of a Class 37 on a passenger train was on 6 January 1961 when D6700, which had been hauling a test train, was commandeered at Bishop's Stortford to take the northbound Fenman forward after the train engine, a Class 31, had failed near Stanstead Abbotts and had been brought into the station by a Class 15. Initial operation of scheduled passenger services on the Liverpool Street to Cambridge line by Class 37s commenced three days later, with D6700 (again) taking the 5.56pm departure from Liverpool Street. Initial batches continued to be delivered to sheds in East Anglia and Class 37s operated express trains out of Liverpool Street to Norwich, Harwich International and Clacton-on-sea as well as on the Cambridge line to Cambridge and beyond to King's Lynn. The services on this route and on boat trains to Harwich were to be the exclusive preserve of the class for over 20 years.

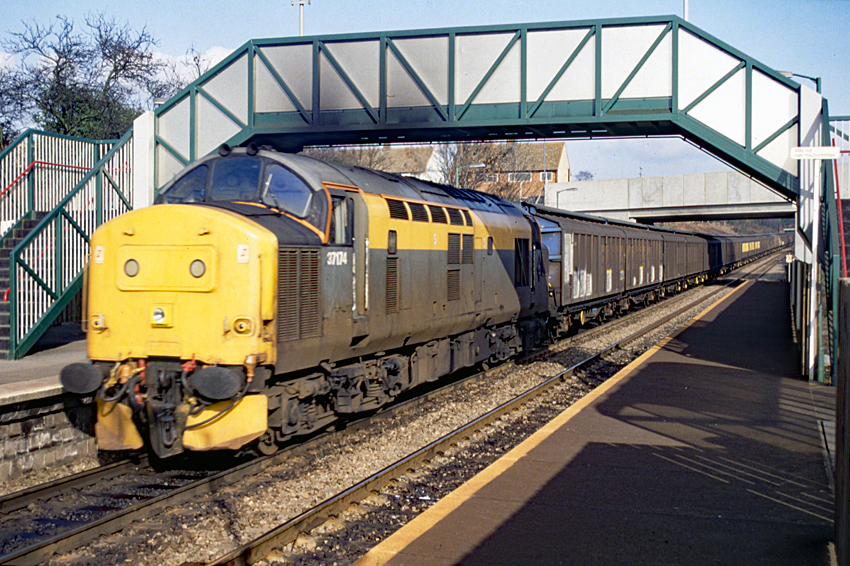
37174 at Bromsgrove, banking a freight train on the Lickey incline in 1991

From D6730 on, a batch of locomotives was allocated to Hull Dairycoates and operated a variety of freight and secondary passenger turns and, along with further allocations to Hull, there were also locomotives delivered to Gateshead, Thornaby and Tinsley, with D6742 and D6743 from the latter depot being sent for trials in South Wales in late 1962. This trial was so successful that within 2 years there were over 100 Class 37s allocated to the WR depots at Swansea, Cardiff and Bristol and from 1964 the class took over work banking on the Lickey Incline with two pairs of locomotives operating in place of the pairs of Hymek diesels that had previously fulfilled this role. Their main use was assisting freight trains but the one passenger train that regularly required their assistance was the Bristol Temple Meads to Glasgow Central & Edinburgh Waverley sleeper.

Initially the locomotives allocated to Tinsley depot operated passenger services on the ex-LNER routes, notably the Pullman service to London King's Cross and the Harwich boat trains from Liverpool Central and Manchester Piccadilly which at that time operated via the Woodhead Tunnel. Allocations to Scotland commenced in 1965 with lowland depots receiving an allocation predominantly for freight operations.

By the late 1970s Class 37s were handling the loco-hauled services west of Swansea to Fishguard Harbour, Milford Haven and Carmarthen although operations to Pembroke Dock remained the exclusive preserve of DMUs. and also on the Western Region, in early 1978 Plymouth Laira received 37 142 from Landore and 37 267 from Stratford to be used on China Clay traffic in place of double-headed Class 25s. Also around this time and on the other side of the country Class 37 locomotives having the later design of nose with the central headcode box were banned from operating into Liverpool Street over concerns about the clearance between the overhead catenary and the roof-mounted horns.

In 1977 some of the steam-heat capable locomotives moved to Scotland and were allocated to Eastfield to replace Class 27s on the West Highland Line and by 1981 all passenger turns on these lines were in their hands. Also on the Scottish Region from summer 1982 Class 37s replaced Class 26s on the Far North line and then Kyle of Lochalsh line from that autumn. With the introduction of Mark 2d/e/f air-conditioned stock 37/0s were coupled to ETHELs (Electric Train Heating Ex-Locomotive) - essentially Class 25s with isolated traction motors that provided Electric Train Heating. By 1985 there were nine class 37s allocated to Inverness and due to plans to retire coaches that required steam-heating and replace them with more modern stock, in that same year 20 Eastfield allocated locomotives were in works for conversion to the 37/4 subclass.

Class 37s were subject to several modifications during their time in service. One short-lived experiment involved 37175 receiving CP5 'self-steering bogies' designed to reduce excess wear and noise on the tightly curved West Highland line to Fort William and Mallaig. This however, proved too expensive to be practicable. Some Inverness allocated Class 37s received 'car lights'; these were essentially spotlights that made them more visible on the sharply curved Scottish branches, especially to users of level crossings. These were eventually either removed or superseded by the modern 'sealed beam' lights that became compulsory from 1993. Other classes fitted with these or similar lights were Class 24s, Class 26s, Class 47s and a solitary Class 86.

In 1985 Class 37s were timetabled to operate over the Cambrian Line for the first time, operating the summer Saturday Only services to Aberystwyth that had previously been hauled by Class 25s. The Class 37s took over the train from Shrewsbury and in one case the service was heavy enough to require two of the class in multiple. While the first year of operation utilised Class 37/0s, from 1986 all but one of the Western Region Class 37 turns were diagrammed for operation by Class 37/4s. These were all allocated to Cardiff Canton, and for the first time included scheduled operation of a train between Crewe and Cardiff Central, a service which had previously been the preserve of Class 33s. In the following years they were also used on the Bristol–Cardiff/Swansea leg of services from Portsmouth Harbour and then on the Heart of Wessex line.

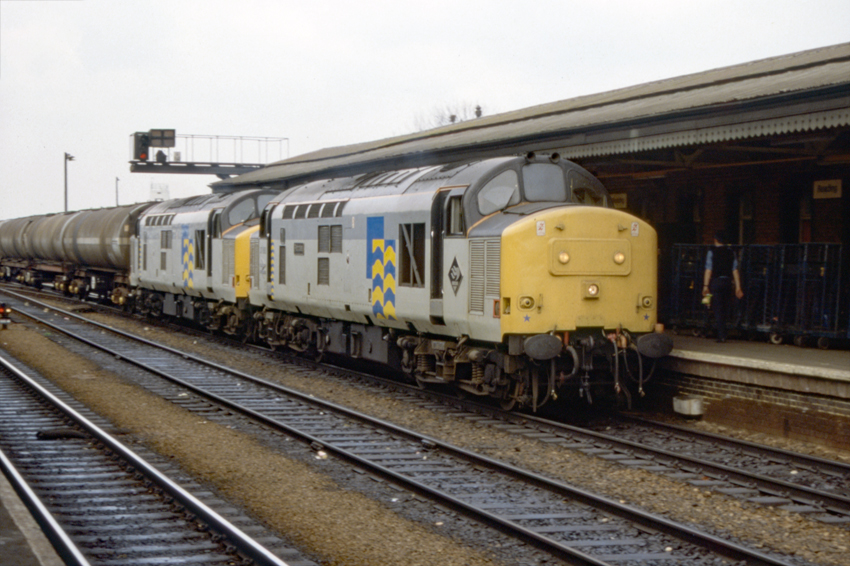
Two Class 37/7s on an oil train at Reading

Over time they were displaced from most passenger work by new build DMUs such as the Sprinter units, though they still found work in the summer and on secondary services from time to time through the 1990s as traffic demand required. This saw use both on the North Wales Coast and, most remarkably, Cardiff–Rhymney local services through to 2006. In Scotland after being displaced from the West Highland and far north routes, 37/4s were used on two diagrams on the Inverness–Edinburgh route for several years as well as being used to Kyle of Lochalsh in the summer and on Inverness–Aberdeen services. The final daily work in Scotland was the Fort William Caledonian Sleeper, this ending in June 2006.

Their freight work similarly reduced, being displaced by higher powered locomotives such as the Class 56 and Class 58 locomotives on coal trains, though they continued on other cargos such as oil tankers for longer.

=== After privatisation ===
In the 1980s, many locomotives were refurbished, which has contributed to the Class 37 fleet becoming one of the longest surviving classes on British railways. However, the introduction of Class 66 locomotives meant many 37s were withdrawn or scrapped. English Welsh & Scottish and Direct Rail Services operated small fleets, with several other examples also operated by spot-hire companies. However, second-hand Class 37s have also proved popular in the export market, with some examples operating in Spain and France, serving the construction of those countries' high-speed railway networks. As of 2026, numerous examples of the class are still in mainline service, despite being over sixty years old.

==== Colas Rail ====
Colas Rail owns ex-preservation 37057, 37099, 37116, 37175, 37219, 37254, 37421, all currently operational.

Additionally, Colas purchased 37146, 37188 and 37207 with the intention of returning them to main line duty but, as of March 2020, 37146 is unlikely to receive its intended overhaul and is expected to be sold or used as a parts donor. 37188 was broken up at UK Rail Leasing's Leicester depot, in 2019.

Between July 2019 and March 2020, three Colas Rail Class 37s (Nos. 37025, 418, 421) operated peak time loco-hauled services on the Rhymney line with eight Mark 2 carriages, the first passenger loco-hauled services on the route since 2005, due to a lack of rolling stock caused by the two-year delay on the Class 769 that was scheduled to run services on the route.

==== Direct Rail Services ====
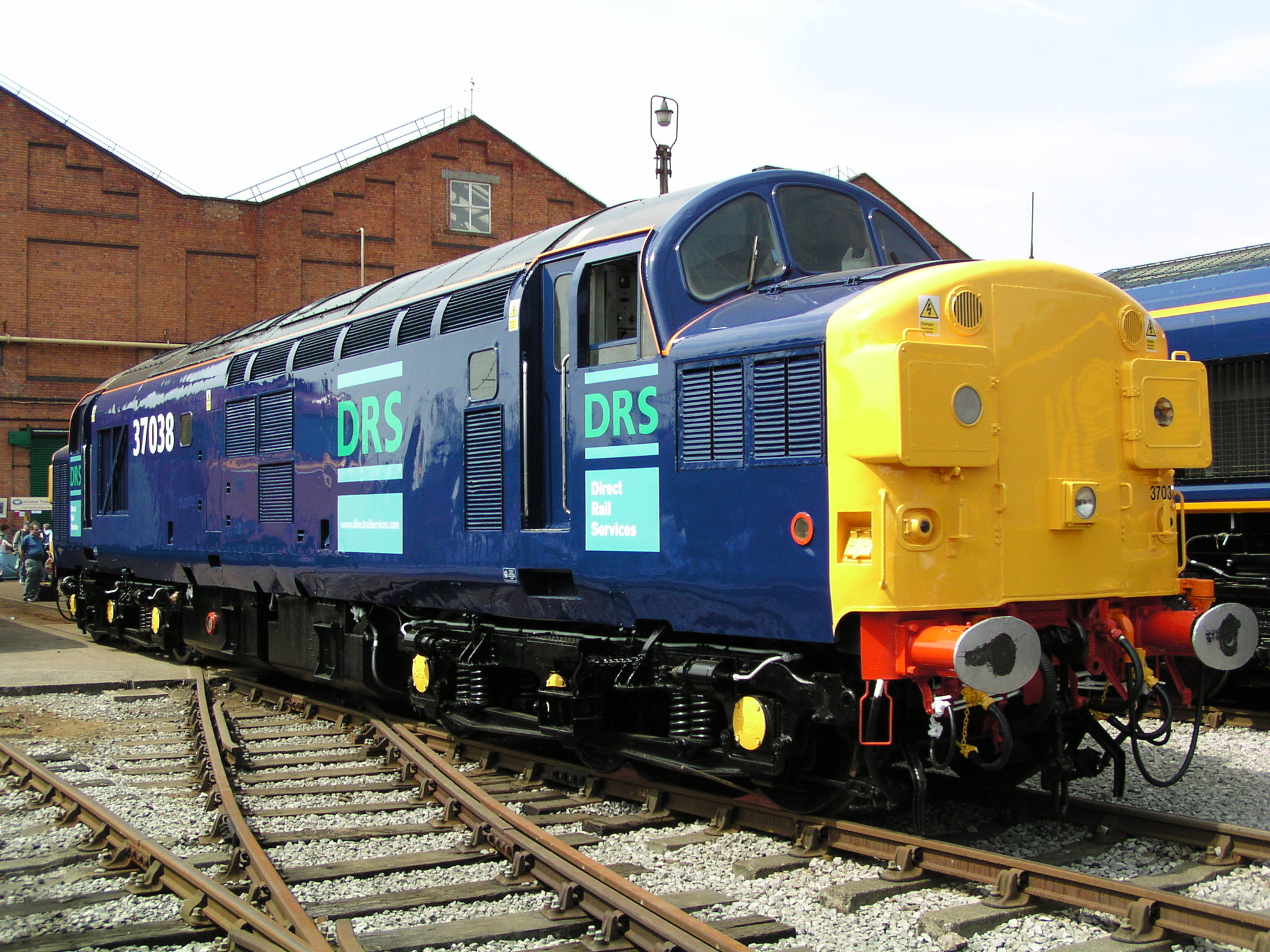
Class 37/0 in Direct Rail Services livery at Crewe Works in 2003

Direct Rail Services (DRS) has a variety of Class 37s operational and others stored. DRS originally purchased and operated a mix of class 37/0s, 37/4s, 37/5s and 37/6s . Most of the DRS 37s were used on nuclear flask services coming from a host of places including Hunterston, Torness, Heysham, Hartlepool, Sizewell, Bridgwater, Valley and Dungeness, but are now being replaced by Class 68s. These are empty or full FNA wagons often containing spent nuclear fuel. Following a review of traction requirements and delivery of its new Vossloh/Stadler UK Light Class 68 diesels and Stadler UK Dual Class 88 bi-mode locomotives, DRS has stored, withdrawn or sold most of its Class 37 fleet, apart from the 37/4s.

In July 2016, 37424 was renumbered 37558 and named Avro Vulcan XH558.

DRS Class 37s were hired to power passenger services on the Wherry lines (Norwich to Great Yarmouth/Lowestoft) for Abellio Greater Anglia between June 2015 and September 2019, due to a shortage of diesel multiple units, as a result of two serious accidents. Until December 2018 they also hauled passenger services on the Cumbrian Coast Line on behalf of Northern Rail (until 2016) and then its successor, Arriva Rail North.

==== EWS/DB Schenker ====
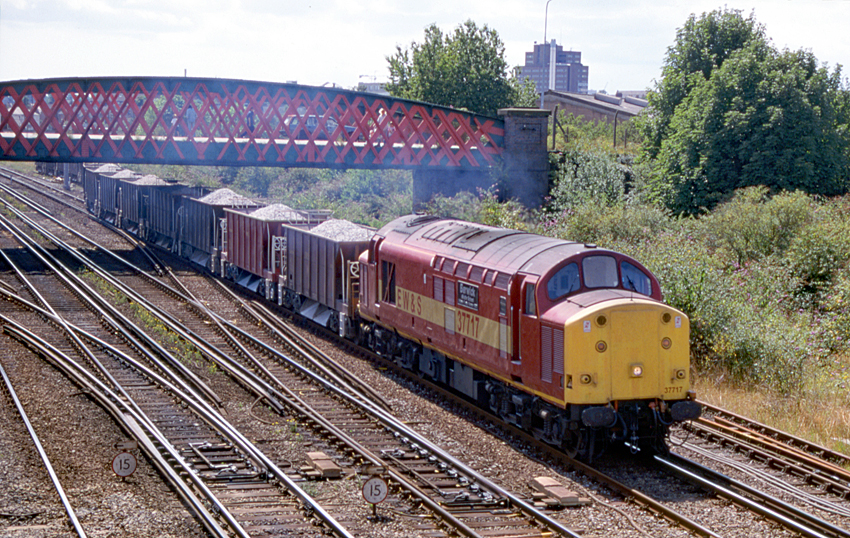
37717 in early EW&S livery at St Denys

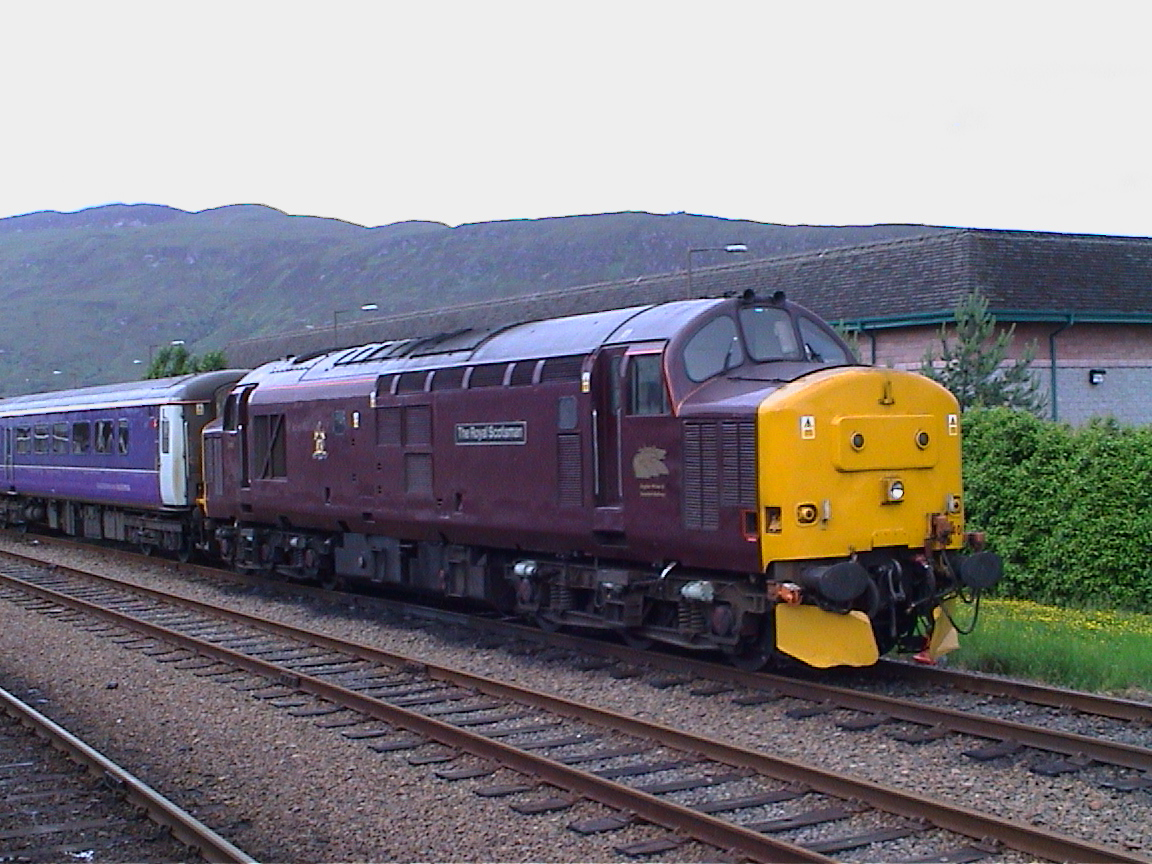
EWS maroon 37401 at Fort William

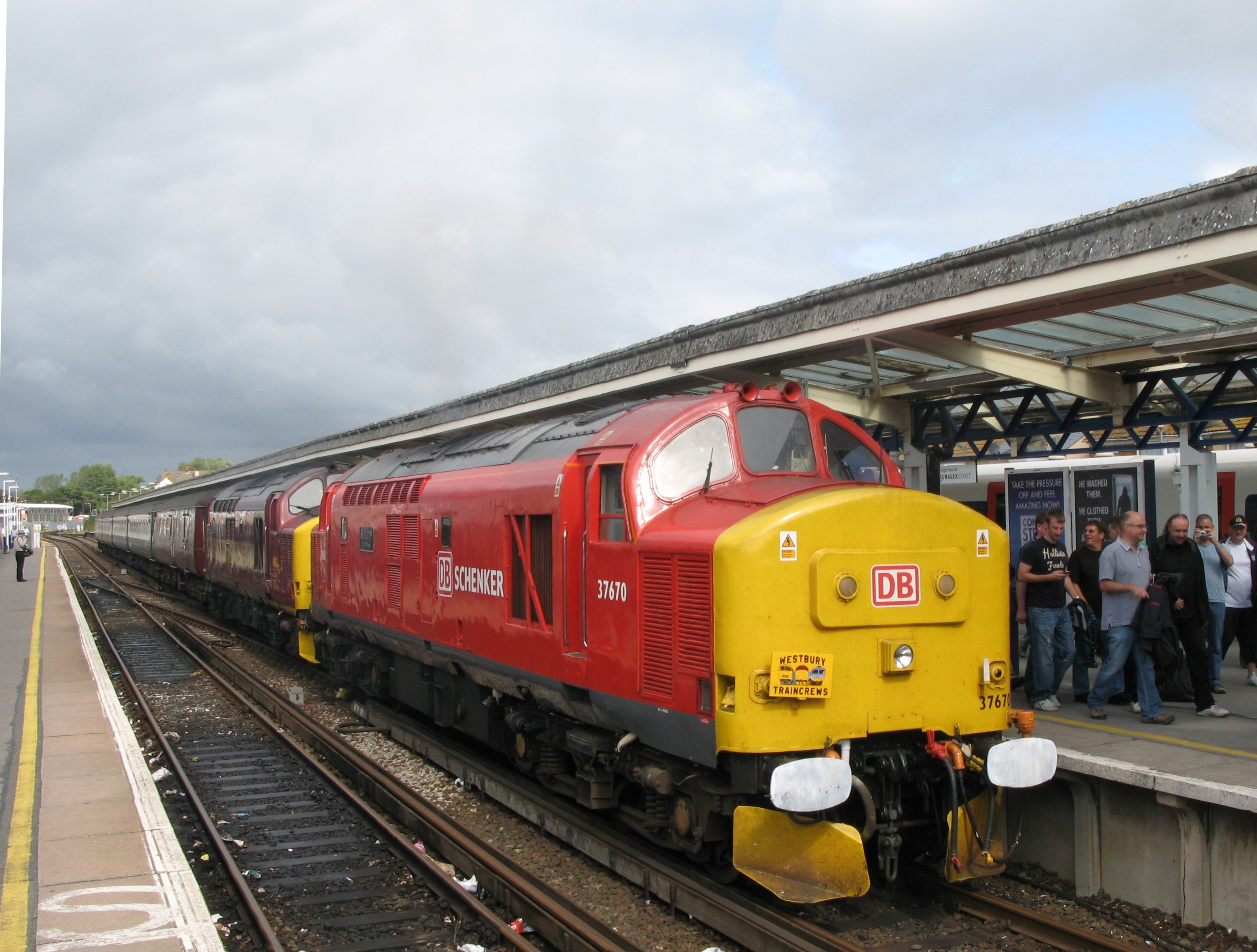
37670 in DB Schenker livery at Weymouth

EWS used a number of Class 37s.

In June 2013, DB Schenker offered six Class 37s for sale: 37703, 37714, 37716, 37718, 37800 and 37884. These had been stored out of use at Dollands Moor after returning from mainland Europe, where they had been working on the construction of a new high speed line. 37703 went on hire/loaned (but still owned by Direct Rail Services) to the Scottish Railway Preservation Society, 37 703/714/716/718 were bought by Direct Rail Services. 37718 was scrapped at CF Booth, Rotherham in July 2015. 37800 and 37884 were bought by Europhoenix and once restored to working order, went on long term hire to Rail Operations Group in a dual Europhoenix/ROG livery.

==== Rail Operations Group ====
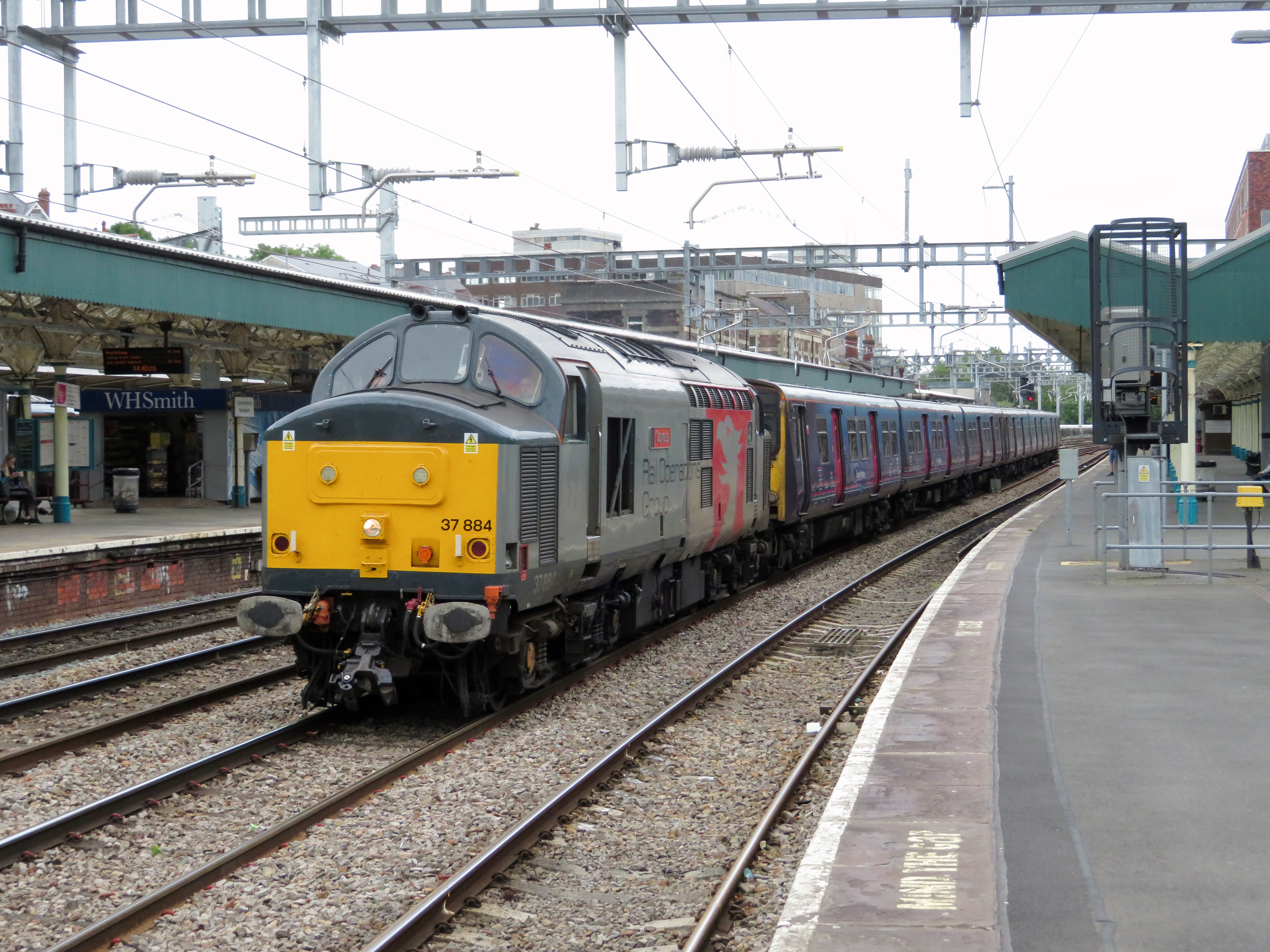
ROG 37884 hauling Class 313 units through Newport

Rail Operations Group (ROG) leases six Class 37s (37510, 37601, 37608, 37611, 37800, 37884) from Europhoenix for frequent moves of passenger stock. These have been modified to be able to couple with and operate the brakes on various EMU classes without the need for translator vehicles.

==== Loram UK ====
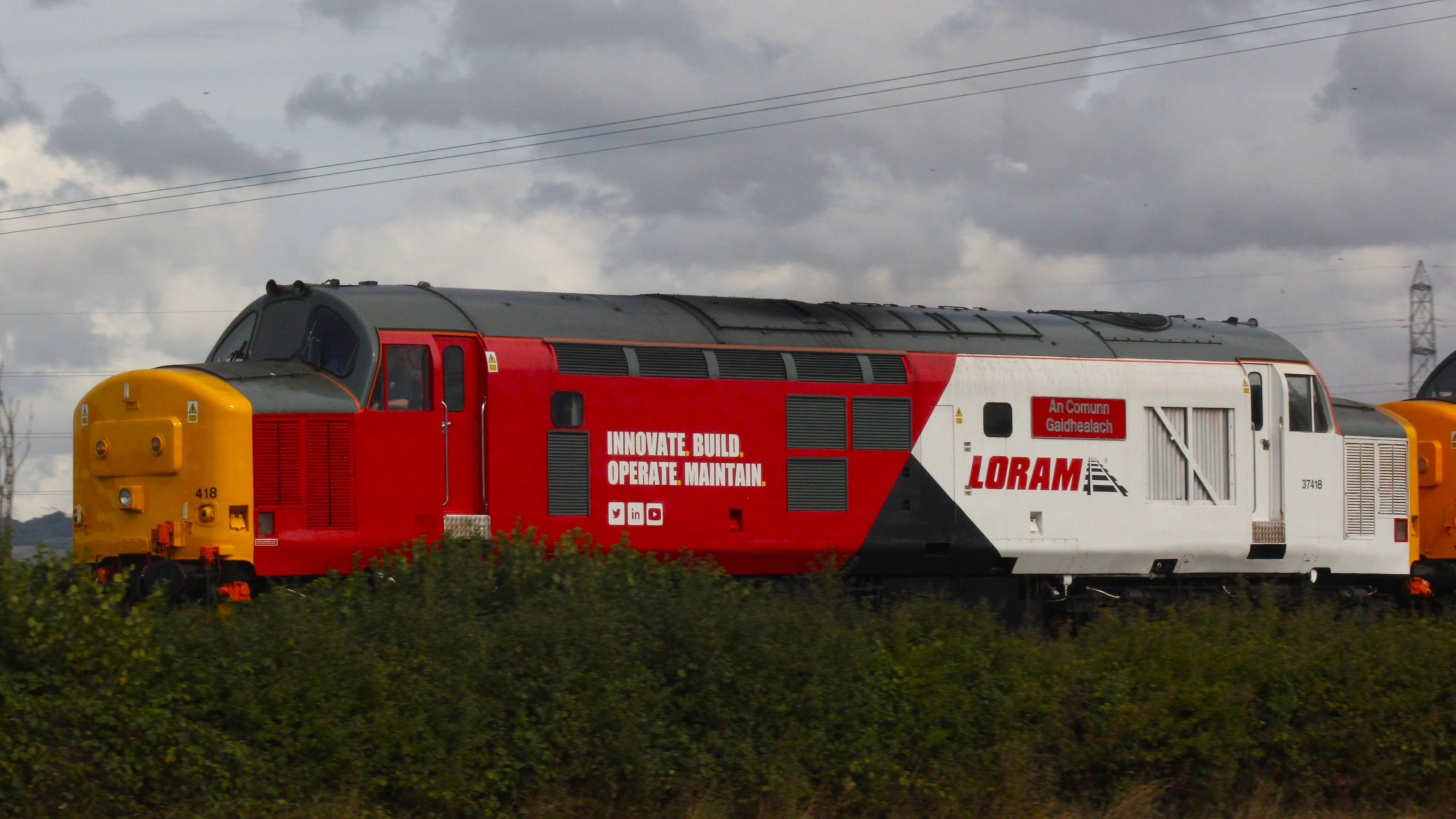
Loram UK Class 37

Loram have agreed with 37418's owner, a continuous permanent lease until at least Spring 2026.

== Operators ==
=== Summary ===
The following is the 2024 fleet summary of mainline registered locomotives, excluding members on preserved railways.

Owner	Number	Numbers	Notes
Colas Rail	8	37025*, 37057, 37099, 37116, 37175, 37219, 37254, 37421	
Europhoenix	12	37510 (Note: Hired to Rail Operations Group), 601, 608, 611, 800, 884, 901. Stored: 37069 (Note: 37069, 218 and 423 will be repaired and put back into service in the future), 146, 207, 218, 407, 423	37670 was cut up on 9 March 2018; 37188 was cut up on 24 July 2019.
Harry Needle Railroad Company	5	37405, 424–425,37607, 610 (Note: Hired to Colas), 612 Stored: 37038, 059, 259, 419, 422, 602, 716	HNRC were originally tasked with locating and overhauling class 37s for Colas.
Locomotive Services Limited	7	37190 (Note: stored at the One:One Collection, Margate.), 401, 402, 409, 521, 603–604, 609, 667, 688 (Note: On long-term lease from D05 Preservation Ltd.)	
Loram UK	1	37418 (Note: Preserved on hire to Loram Rail), 508	
Network Rail	4	97301 (37100), 97302 (37170), 97303 (37178), 97304 (37217).	ERTMS fitted for Cambrian Lines
UK Rail Leasing	1	37905	
Vintage Trains	1	37240	
West Coast Railways	11	37516, 518, 676, 668 (Note: fitted with Hitachi ERTMS/ETCS Equipment for Cambrian Lines in 2015. Not yet used alone on Charters over the line.), 669, 685, 706. Stored; 37165 (Note: Spares donor), 517, 710, 712.	
Total	50		

== Accidents and incidents ==
- In January 1988, locomotives No. 37671 and 37672 were hauling a freight train that was diverted into a siding at Tavistock Junction, Devon due to a pointsman's error. The train collided with a wagon, pushed it through the buffers and was derailed.
- On 2 September 2009, a Class 97/3 locomotive operated by Network Rail collided with a Fiat Punto on an unmanned level crossing near Penrhyndeudraeth. The elderly driver of the car was killed in the collision.
- On 12 May 2014, locomotive 37198, stored by Network Rail on the Great Central Railway and coupled to a Post Office Sorting Van, ran away for 1.8 miles (2.9 km) due to an ineffectively placed wheel scotch. It then struck the end vehicle of a rake of five Mark 1 coaches.

== Departmental ==
=== Network Rail ERTMS project ===
Network Rail restored four Class 37s as part of the European Rail Traffic Management System (ERTMS) trial project on the Cambrian Line. The site of the restoration was the Barrow Hill Roundhouse, where ex-HNRC locomotives 37100, 37170, 37178 and 37217 were taken in. The restored Class 37s for ERTMS use were re-designated as Class 97/3, numbered 97301, 97302, 97303 and 97304.

The class was chosen because of its original fitment with both air and vacuum braking, a feature which will allow them to pull both modern freight trains as well as special enthusiast trains. The main work of the locomotives is to pull on-track machines (such as tampers) through the ERTMS section.

The 97/3s are based at the newly constructed Coleham Depot for the duration of the ERTMS testing on the Cambrian Line, thereafter they are used to pilot trains not fitted with the ERTMS signalling system. They are also used to work Network Rail test trains on other parts of the network when not required for ERTMS testing.

These locos were effectively refurbished, having been completely stripped down to bare steel, with reconditioned engines, somewhat updated cabs, all new signalling systems installed (ERTMS in this instance) and extensive re-wiring.

97302, 303, and 304 all remain operational as of August 2022. 97301 is currently stored at Derby RTC.

== Preservation ==
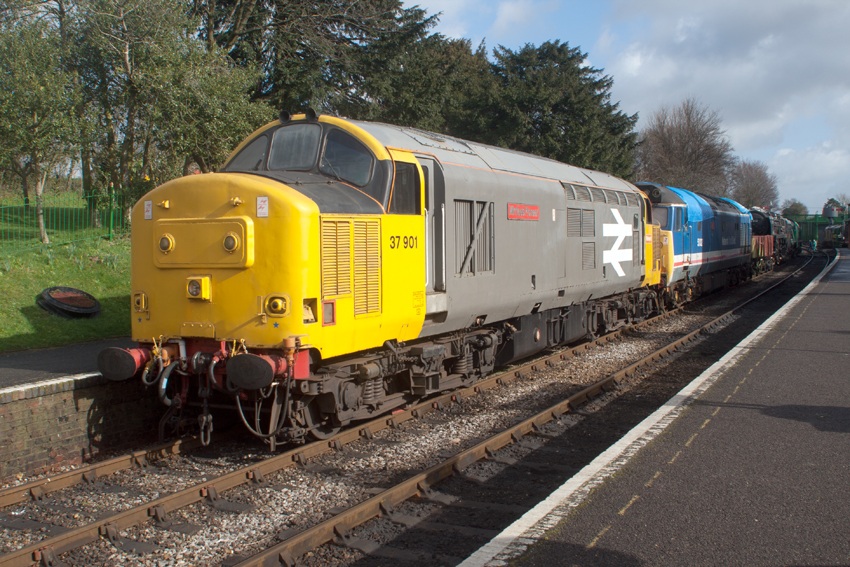
37901 Mirrlees Pioneer

Class 37 locomotives have proven very popular with preservation groups and enthusiasts alike. Many have been restored to operational service on heritage railways, whilst others are awaiting overhaul or restoration. Notable preserved examples include the first-built locomotive, D6700, and the last, 37308.

A number of the class have been sold out of preservation to mainline operators, including both Ruston-engined prototypes Nos. 37905/6. One locomotive, 37372, has been procured by the Baby Deltic Project, for conversion into a replica of a Class 23 Baby Deltic.

Pre TOPS	Post TOPS	Final	Name	Owner	Location	Livery	Notes
D6607	37307	37403	Isle of Mull	Privately owned	Bo'ness and Kinneil Railway	BR Blue Large Logo	Operational
D6608	37274	37308		Privately owned	Severn Valley Railway	Sky Blue undercoat	Awaiting overhaul
D6700	37119	37350	(National Railway Museum)	National Railway Museum	Great Central Railway	BR Green	Operational First-built Class 37
D6703	37003	37360	Dereham Neatherd High School	Class 37 Locomotive Group	UKRL Leicester TMD	BR Blue	Undergoing overhaul
D6709	37009	37340		English Electric Preservation	Great Central Railway (Nottingham)	BR Blue	Undergoing restoration
D6723	37023	-	(Stratford)	Privately owned	Pontypool and Blaenavon Railway	BR Blue Large Logo	Undergoing restoration
D6724	37024	37714	Cardiff Canton	Heavy Tractor Group	Great Central Railway	Railfreight Triple Grey Metals Sub-Sector	Operational
D6725	37025	-	Inverness TMD	The Scottish Thirty-Seven Group	Bo'ness and Kinneil Railway	BR Blue Large Logo	Operational
D6729	37029	-		Privately owned	Pontypool and Blaenavon Railway	BR Green	Operational
D6732	37032	37353	(Mirage)	Privately owned	North Norfolk Railway	BR Green	Operational
D6737	37037	37321	(Gartcosh)	Devon Diesel Society	South Devon Railway	BR Blue	Undergoing restoration
D6742	37042	-		Privately owned	Weardale Railway	EWS Maroon & Gold	Undergoing restoration
D6775	37075	-		Privately owned	Keighley and Worth Valley Railway	Railfreight Triple Grey	Operational
D6797	37097	-	Old Fettercairn	Caledonian Railway Diesel Group	Caledonian Railway	BR Blue	Operational
D6808	37108	37325		Privately owned	Great Central Railway (Nottingham)	BR Green	Awaiting restoration to running condition
D6809	37109	-		ELR Diesel Group	East Lancashire Railway	Railfreight Triple Grey Metals Sub-Sector	Operational
D6823	37123	37679		Privately owned	Railway Support Services	Railfreight Triple Grey	Stored
D6842	37142	-			Bodmin and Wenford Railway	BR Blue	Undergoing overhaul
D6852	37152	37310	British Steel Ravenscraig	Privately owned	Peak Rail	BR Blue Large Logo	Operational
D6869	37169	37674	(St Blaise Church 1445 – 1995)	Privately owned	Strathspey Railway	Railfreight Red Stripe	Operational
D6898	37198	-		Darlington Borough Council	Head of Steam	BR Green	Static display. Donated to the museum by Network Rail.
D6905	37205	37688	Great Rocks	DO5 Ltd	Locomotive Services Limited	Railfreight Triple Grey Construction Sub-Sector	Operational
D6906	37206	37906			Battlefield Line Railway	Railfreight Triple Grey	Undergoing overhaul Ruston RK270T engine
D6915	37215	-		The Growler Group	Gloucestershire Warwickshire Railway	BR Blue	Operational
D6916	37216	-	(Great Eastern)	Private	Pontypool and Blaenavon Railway	BR Green	Undergoing restoration
D6927	37227	-			Chinnor and Princes Risborough Railway	Railfreight Triple Grey Metals Sub-Sector	Operational
D6948	37248	-	(Midland Railway Center/Loch Arkaig)	Privately owned – in custodianship of 'The Growler Group'	Gloucestershire Warwickshire Railway	BR Green	Operational
D6950	37250	-		Privately owned	Wensleydale Railway	Dutch Civil Engineers' Grey & Yellow	Operational
D6955	37255	-		Privately owned	Nemesis Rail	Dutch Civil Engineers' Grey & Yellow	Stored
D6961	37261	-	(Caithness)	Privately owned	Bo'ness and Kinneil Railway		
D6963	37263	-		Privately owned	Telford Steam Railway	BR Departmental Grey	
D6964	37264	-		Privately Owned	North Yorkshire Moors Railway	BR Blue Large Logo	
D6971	37271	37418	An Comunn Galdhealach (Pectinidae/East Lancashire Railway)	Privately owned – On hire to Loram	Derby R.T.C.	Loram Red and White	Mainline Operational
D6975	37275	-	(Stainless Pioneer/Oor Wullie)		Dartmouth Steam Railway	BR Blue	Operational
D6994	37294	-			Embsay and Bolton Abbey Steam Railway	BR Blue	

== Models ==
In 1965, Hornby Railways launched its first version of the BR Class 37 in OO gauge.

In 2008, Bachmann introduced a couple of versions of the locomotive in OO gauge, which included DCC sound: 37057 with the unofficial name of Viking, and 37698 Coedbach in two-tone grey Railfreight Coal livery. Italian company ViTrains released four OO gauge versions of the Class 37 in 2008. These were 37378 in Railfreight red stripe livery, 37371 in Mainline blue livery, 37405 in EWS livery and 37201 in Railfreight metals sector livery.

In 2008, Graham Farish introduced British N gauge models of 37038 and 37238 in BR blue, and D6707 and D6826 in BR green. In 2012, Graham Farish introduced a DCC-ready British N gauge model of 97302 in Network Rail yellow and a Class 37/0 model in EWS livery.

In 2020, Accurascale announced that they would release their own OO gauge Class 37 model in 2023.

== See also ==
- Passenger locomotives in use in the UK
