= Castlecary rail accidents =

Two rail accidents in Scotland

Coordinates: 55.98045°N 3.94880°W

Two rail accidents have occurred near Castlecary, Scotland. One of these was in 1937 and one in 1968. Both events involved rear-end collisions, and caused the deaths of 35 and 2 people respectively.

== 1937 accident ==
Castlecary rail crash (1937)

Details
- Date: 10 December 1937
- Location: Castlecary
- Country: Scotland
- Line: Glasgow to Edinburgh via Falkirk Line
- Operator: London and North Eastern Railway
- Cause: Signalman error Wrong-side failure (unverified)

Statistics
- Trains: 2
- Deaths: 35
- Injured: 179

On 10 December 1937 at 4:37 p.m., the 4:03 p.m. Edinburgh Waverley to Glasgow Queen Street express train collided at Castlecary station with the late-running 2:00 p.m. express train from Dundee to Glasgow Queen Street on the Edinburgh to Glasgow main line of the London and North Eastern Railway (LNER), killing 35 people. Snow was falling at the time of the accident.

The Edinburgh train hit the rear of the standing Dundee train at an estimated 60 mph (95 km/h). Due to the confines of the location, the rear four coaches of the Dundee train disintegrated completely. The engine of the Dundee train, an LNER Class D29 № 9896 Dandie Dinmont, was pushed forward 52 yards (48 m). The locomotive of the Edinburgh train, LNER Class A3 № 2744 Grand Parade, was damaged beyond repair (and was replaced by a new engine with the same number and name in April 1938).

=== Aftermath ===
The death toll was 35, and 179 people were hurt, of whom 24 were detained in hospital. The Scotsman published a detailed list of all the killed and injured. An eight-year-old girl was counted as missing (some locals swore to seeing her ghost for many years). The driver of the Edinburgh train was committed to court on a charge of culpable homicide (the Scottish equivalent of manslaughter) for supposedly driving too fast for the weather conditions, but the charge was dropped. The Inspecting Officer concluded that it was the signalman who was principally at fault for the disaster. This was Britain's worst snow-related rail crash, others of note being Elliot Junction in 1906 and Abbots Ripton in 1876. A full length part animated, part documentary film about the incident and its effects was made in 2020.

=== Causes ===
At around the time of the accident, snow was falling, but the signalman at Castlecary claimed that it did not affect visibility to the extent of needing to take any special precautions. A set of points ahead had been blocked by snow and caused several trains to back up, and the Castlecary home signal was therefore at "danger". The Dundee train ran past the signal, and the signalman at Castlecary thought it was not going to stop at all, and therefore telegraphed "train running away" to the next signal box. In fact the train stopped 325 yards beyond the home signal. The Castlecary signalman failed to check the Dundee train's whereabouts, and also failed to consider that a train running past the home signal at danger might indicate some fault with the signals, and allowed the following Edinburgh train into the section. Shortly before the Edinburgh train arrived, the fireman of the Dundee train entered the signal box to say that the Dundee train had stopped just beyond the platform. The signalman now knew that the line was not clear and made a last-minute attempt to stop the Edinburgh train, but this also ran past the home signal and collided with the Dundee train. The drivers of both trains survived, and both claimed that the Castlecary distant signal was showing "clear". The inspecting officer was not able to verify this, and placed the blame on the Castlecary signalman for accepting the Edinburgh train without first ascertaining what had become of the Dundee train.

== 1968 accident ==
Castlecary rail crash (1968)

Details
- Date: 9 September 1968; 09:15
- Location: Castlecary
- Country: Scotland
- Line: Glasgow to Edinburgh via Falkirk Line
- Operator: British Rail Scottish Region
- Cause: Signalman error leading to driver error, excessive speed.

Statistics
- Trains: 2
- Deaths: 2
- Injured: 3

A second accident occurred in Castlecary on 9 September 1968, also a rear-end collision. Following the failure of a signal at Greenhill Junction, trains were required (by Rule 55) to stop at the failed signal and report their presence to Signalman D. Craig at Greenhill Junction via the signal telephone. He would allow them to proceed slowly past the signal, at around 10 mph (15 km/h), and then report on passing the signal to continue to obey previous signals. This method had worked since the signal's failure the night before and throughout the early morning, but at 09:00, Craig became confused by the presence of four different trains in the Greenhill area.

Of these trains, the Down 07:40 Dundee-Glasgow service passed through Greenhill uneventfully, but its passage resulted in Craig being forced to hold the Down 08:30 Edinburgh-Glasgow service north of Greenhill Junction. At the same time, the Up 08:46 Glasgow-Edinburgh service driven by Driver W. Watson, consisting of two three-car Class 126 DMUs, stopped at the failed signal, and when Watson contacted Craig on the telephone, Craig misunderstood the call, believing Watson to be the Down train, and told him that he was waiting for a train at Greenhill Junction. The mistake was furthered by Watson's failure to identify his train. Shortly after, Class 24 engine D5122, crewed by Driver W. McIntosh and Secondman R. Birrell, running light from Glasgow to Perth, arrived at the signal in rear of the Up train. Birrell contacted Craig at Greenhill. Like Watson, Birrell failed to identify his train; in combination with Birrell’s impatient tone, this led Craig to repeat the mistake - again believing that he was speaking to the Up DMU at the failed signal. (Its Rule 55 call had been overdue for some minutes.) He gave Birrell authority to pass the signal ahead at danger, at caution speed. D5122 then set off, but McIntosh took his engine to around 40 mph (65 km/h). As result, when the Up DMU became visible to him, he was unable to stop in time and collided with the rear of the Up DMU. Both trainmen were killed instantly. Mere seconds after the collision, the Down line cleared and the Down DMU proceeded, suffering minor damage from a jutting piece of debris scraping the cab.

The report by Colonel I.K.A. McNaughton in 1970 agreed that the accident was due to a combination of Craig's confusion in identifying the trains, furthered by Birrell and Watson's failure to identify their trains, and that Driver McIntosh had driven his train at an unsafe speed past the signal.

== See also ==
- Lists of rail accidents
- List of British rail accidents

== Sources ==
- Hamilton., J.A.B. (1967). British Railway Accidents of the 20th Century (reprinted as Disaster down the Line). George Allen and Unwin / Javelin Books. ISBN 0-7137-1973-7.
- Nock, O.S. (1980). Historic Railway Disasters (2nd ed.). Ian Allan. ISBN 0-7110-1752-2.
- Rolt, L.T.C. (1956). Red for Danger. Bodley Head / David and Charles / Pan Books. ISBN 0-7509-2047-5.
