= British Rail Class 24 =

Diesel-electric railway locomotive used in Great Britain

British Railways Type 2 British Rail Class 24
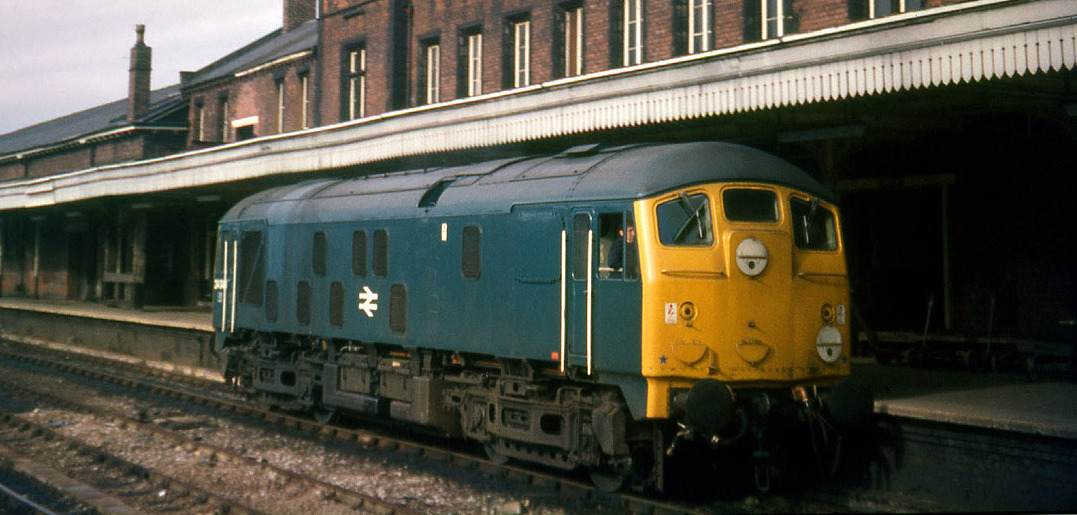
- A BR Blue Class 24 at Walsall in 1975.
Type and origin
- Power type: Diesel-electric
- Builder: British Railways Derby Works, Darlington Works and Crewe Works
- Build date: 1958–1961
- Total produced: 151
Specifications
- Configuration
  - UIC: Bo′Bo′
  - Commonwealth: Bo-Bo
- Gauge: 4 ft 8 1/2 in (1,435 mm) standard gauge
- Wheel diameter: 3 ft 9 in (1.143 m)
- Minimum curve: 4.5 chains (91 m)
- Wheelbase: 36 ft 6 in (11.13 m)
- Length: 50 ft 6 in (15.39 m)
- Width: 8 ft 10 in (2.69 m)
- Height: 12 ft 8 in (3.86 m)
- Loco weight: Class 24/0: 79 long tons (80.3 t; 88.5 short tons); Class 24/1: 73 long tons (74.2 t; 81.8 short tons)
- Fuel capacity: Class 24/0: 546 imp gal (2,480 L; 656 US gal); Class 24/1: 500 imp gal (2,300 L; 600 US gal)
- Prime mover: Sulzer 6LDA28
- Generator: BTH RTB15656 DC
- Traction motors: 4 × BTH 137BY, DC
- Transmission: Diesel electric
- MU working: ★ Blue Star
- Train heating: Steam
- Train brakes: Vacuum
Performance figures
- Maximum speed: 75 mph (121 km/h)
- Power output: Engine: 1,160 hp (865 kW); At rail: 843 hp (629 kW)
- Tractive effort: Maximum: 42,000 lbf (186.8 kN); Continuous: 21,300 lbf (94.7 kN)
- Brakeforce: 38 long tons-force (380 kN)
Career
- Operators: British Railways
- Numbers: D5000–D5150; later 24001–24047, 24051–24141
- Axle load class: Class 24/0: RA 7 (6 from 1969); Class 24/1: RA 6 (5 from 1959)
- Retired: 1967–1980
- Disposition: Four preserved, remainder scrapped

The British Rail Class 24 diesel locomotives, originally known as the Sulzer Type 2, were built from 1958 to 1961. 151 were built at Derby, Crewe and Darlington, the first twenty of them as part of the British Railways 1955 Modernisation Plan. This class was used as the basis for the development of the Class 25 locomotives.

The final survivor, no. 24081, was withdrawn from Crewe depot in 1980.

== Technical details ==
=== Engine ===
The main power for the class 24 was the Sulzer 6LDA28 diesel engine - denoting 6 cylinders; Locomotive use; Direct fuel injection; (turbo-charged); 28 cm (11 in) bore cylinders. This was effectively an off-the-shelf purchase with small changes to bearings, injectors and some other minor items. The same engine was used in the CIÉ 101 Class locomotives in Ireland.

=== Transmission ===
The diesel engine powered another off-the-shelf product, the British Thomson-Houston (BTH) RTB15656 main generator which, in the class 24, was rated at 735 kW (986 hp), 750/525 V and 980/1400 A at 750 rpm. Traction motors, one per axle, were also by BTH being the type 137BY rated at 222 hp (166 kW), 525 V, 350 A at 560 rpm connected to the axle via a 16:81 gear stepdown ratio, each force ventilated by an AEI 12.2 hp (9.1 kW) electric motor.

=== Train heating ===
The original pilot scheme locomotives (D5000–D5019) were fitted with a Stone Vapor type OK4646A steam heating boiler with a 600 imperial gallons (2,700 litres; 720 US gallons) water tank. The following ten locomotives had the similar 1,750 pounds (790 kg) per hour type OK4616B and a reduced water capacity of 450 imperial gallons (2,000 litres; 540 US gallons), and this was perpetuated in the remaining production run which used the Stone Vapour 1,000 pounds (450 kg) per hour type L4610 boiler. These variations meant that the initial batch of 20 locomotives weighed 79 long tons 16 hundredweight (81.1 t; 89.4 short tons), the following 10 locomotives slightly less at 78 long tons 16 hundredweight (80.1 t; 88.3 short tons), the remaining Class 24/0 at 77 long tons (78 t; 86 short tons), and the Class 24/1 at exactly 73 long tons (74 t; 82 short tons). During subsequent years the boilers were removed from the majority of Class 24/1 locomotives, reducing the overall weight by 2 long tons (2.03 t; 2.24 short tons). Ten locomotives (D5102–5111) had no train heating, the space being occupied by the air compressors needed for operating the Consett iron ore trains.

=== Other systems ===
Several of the systems within the class 24s were standard. The braking system was the standard BR system, adopted as part of the Modernisation Plan, of locomotive air and train vacuum brake, both applied by a single handle via a proportional valve. Similarly, the connection for multiple working was the standard electro-pneumatic system designated "Blue Star" with each locomotive bearing a small blue-coloured 5-pointed star above each buffer to denote this. Also common was the provision of a door to allow staff to pass between locomotives, or between a locomotive and adjacent coach. In practice, these were rarely used and were sealed shut at overhaul during the 1970s to reduce draughts in the cab.

With production reaching 151 there were some differences between batches of locomotives too. Ten of the initial twenty had "Athermos" pressure-lubricated plain bearing axleboxes rather than the more usual roller-bearing axleboxes. Although these remained for the life of the locomotives they were the only ones so fitted. Much more noticeable were D5114–D5132 which were fitted with tablet catchers on the side of the driver's cab for use on the Far North Line from Inverness and on the Highland Main Line from Perth to Inverness. Also very visible were the roof-mounted headcode boxes fitted from D5114 giving an outward appearance very similar to the later Class 25 but without horn grilles.

== External condition ==
=== Liveries ===
The pilot scheme locomotives were delivered in overall green livery with a grey roof and black below the body. D5000 was delivered with a narrow light grey stripe at waist level while the remainder had a broad light grey stripe at solebar level. This light grey stripe may have appeared bluish and has been described as pale blue or eggshell, but in most illustrations, it appears to be off-white. At first, green liveried locomotives had plain green ends, but this was changed from 1962 to small yellow warning panels, and then from 1967 to full yellow ends, some locomotives receiving these while still in green livery. At least five locomotives were repainted in two-tone green livery (applied along with the small yellow warning panel) in a similar manner to Class 47s and some Class 25s.

The first class 24 painted in Rail Blue livery was D5068 in December 1966, and repainting continued into the mid-1970s, although some locomotives were withdrawn before being painted in this colour.

=== Alterations ===
As with many large classes of locomotive, there were some variations during the Class 24s' lifetime, some affecting all of the class (nominally), and others just individual locomotives. One such locomotive was 24133, one of the last survivors of the class and easily recognised as it had different headcode boxes on each end, the standard one for the class at one end and that at the other end matching those used on the Class 27. This was not unique, as 24145 had a headcode box similar to those fitted to later batches of Class 25s.

In 1960 D5008 was fitted with a Pressure-charging Protection Unit which was designed to prevent the engine from running continuously above the smoke limit. The unit failed on one occasion allowing significant smoke emission, and in general did not demonstrate any significant impact on the amount of visible smoke emitted. The unit was subsequently removed.

== Operation ==
Distribution of locomotives, March 1974
British Rail Class 24 is located in the United Kingdom
Code	Name	Quantity
CD	Crewe Diesel	64
ED	Eastfield	30
GD	Gateshead	9
HA	Haymarket	9
IS	Inverness	18
LO	Longsight Diesel	7
Withdrawn (1967–72)		14
Total built:		151

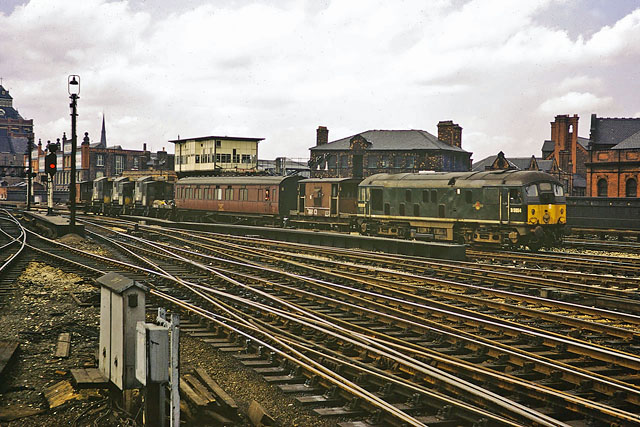
D5054 at Manchester Exchange with an engineering train, 1968.

Initial deliveries were for operation in the Crewe and Derby areas, but fifteen of the initial twenty were diverted for use on the Southern Region to cover for delays in the Kent Coast Electrification scheme. Here the heavy weight was not acceptable and the locomotives in question had to have their boilers removed before they were accepted. Later some locomotives had their boilers re-fitted and these examples could be found, often in tandem with a Class 33 to provide steam heating to the coaches, the 33s only having electric train heat (ETH).

As deliveries continued allocations were made to both the London Midland Region and Eastern Region, and with the class becoming familiar to crews and staff around London they were used on freight trains over the Metropolitan Widened Lines, locomotives so used being fitted with London Transport tripcocks – although these were removed after closure of this route in 1971. Locomotives allocated to East Anglia for use on freight soon became redundant due to the rundown of freight in that region, and these were, in turn, moved to Wales and Lancashire.

Class 24s took over the 'Condor' fast freight service between London (Hendon) and Glasgow (Gushetfaulds) in 1961, the train having previously been hauled by the Metro-Vic Co-Bo locomotives for which it is best remembered. Thus the class was also used when a second "Condor" fast overnight freight service was introduced, running from Aston to Glasgow. These were the usual motive power from its introduction on 17 January 1963 when D5082 hauled the Down train and D5083 the up train until replaced by the first Freightliner service in 1965.

The batch D5096–D5113 were all allocated to Gateshead depot in 1966 to replace 9F steam locomotives on the Tyne Dock to Consett iron ore trains. These workings used a special design of bogie hopper wagon, and these locomotives had an additional compressor and associated pipework. These workings, typically with loads of around 1,000 tons, were double-headed and continued until taken over by Class 37s in the 1970s, when these locomotives were reallocated to Scottish depots. Incidentally D5096 was, when delivered in January 1960, the first main line diesel locomotive to be built at Darlington Works.

The next batch of locomotives, D5114–D5132, were allocated to Inverness, and became synonymous with rail operations in the Scottish Highlands, as did a similar batch of Class 26 locomotives, the two being considered interchangeable in operation. Single Class 24s operated from Inverness on passenger and freight trains of up to 290 tons, and double-headed on trains up to 580 tons including the Royal Highlander which was regularly made up of 16 coaches. Class 24s and Class 26s were used turn and turn about until all Class 24s allocated to Inverness were replaced by Class 26s in 1975.

The final batch of Class 24s were allocated to the London Midland Region for use on the "Western Lines" which covered North Wales and Mid Wales. In the latter area, particularly on the ex-Cambrian Railways lines, Class 24s and the similar Class 25s were the only diesel types to be found, and crews from Aberystwyth shed were only trained on these types. This proved to be an issue on summer Saturdays, and after problems with timekeeping and failures in service, heavier trains were double-headed or hauled by the more powerful Class 40 locomotives between Shrewsbury and Aberystwyth.

=== Departmental use ===
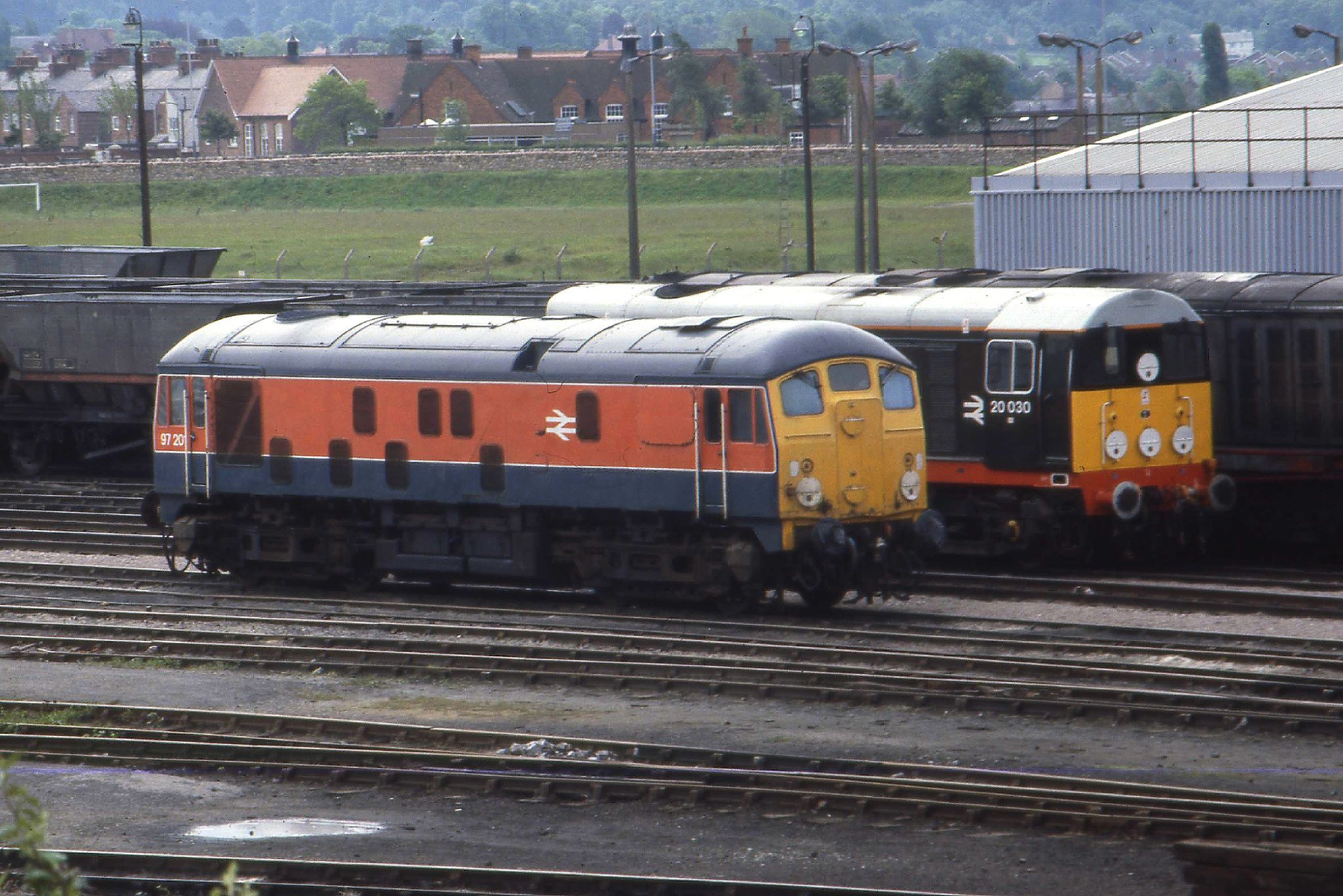
97201 at Worksop in BR Research Division livery

In November 1975, 24061 was transferred to BRs research department based at Derby Works, and was allocated the number RDB968007. This locomotive was subsequently renumbered as 97201 and was finally withdrawn on 4 December 1987, the last Class 24 to be operational on BR. After withdrawal in 1976 two Class 24s were converted into train pre-heating units and were allocated to the Western Region: 24054 was withdrawn in August and became TDB968008, being allocated to Newton Abbot until withdrawn in October 1982; 24142 became TDB968009 and was allocated to Landore.

=== Withdrawal ===
The very first Class 24 to be withdrawn was in November 1967 when a fire broke out on D5051 while it was working a train of empty coal wagons in Scotland. The damage was too severe for it to be repaired, and it was cut up at Inverurie in August 1968. It had lasted exactly 8 years. The second Class 24 to be withdrawn was also as the result of an accident in Scotland, this time at Castlecary. In this case D5122, running light engine, hit a stationary DMU at about 40 mph (64 km/h), the impact and subsequent fire bending the main frames and completely destroying the No.2 end. The accident happened on 9 September 1968 but despite being withdrawn the same month, the locomotive was not finally cut up until March 1971. A total of fourteen Class 24s were withdrawn and scrapped without receiving a TOPS number.

Some Class 24s were withdrawn in 1973 with the closure of the Waverley route, which linked Carlisle and Edinburgh Waverley, but most of these were put into storage and subsequently re-entered traffic to fill gaps left by the movement of Class 25s to cover the withdrawal of Class 22s on the Western Region. Thus Class 24 withdrawals only started in earnest with completion of the Glasgow electrification in 1974, and re-allocation of Class 26 and Class 27 locomotives saw the Class 24s concentrated around various Lancashire depots and at Carlisle. On 27 November 1976 there were just ten Class 24s still in operational service, all allocated to Crewe Diesel Depot (depot code CD). However, with the reinstatement of 24082 and 24073 this number climbed to 12 by February 1977.

In January 1978, two farewell railtours were run – 24082 and 24087 hauled the Merseyside Express from London St Pancras to Liverpool Lime Street and return on the 14th, and 24087 and 24133 hauled the Cambrian Coast Express from Birmingham New Street to Aberystwyth and Barmouth on the 28th. On the latter trip, 24087 failed on the outward journey, was dumped at Machynlleth on the return journey and never worked again.

On 21 January 24133 had also taken part in the "Farewell to the 44s" tour, providing steam heating for the coaches while 44008 Penyghent provided the motive power, on the Crewe to Chester leg of a circular tour from London.

For the summer of 1978, six class 24s remained in service – 24023, 035, 047, 063, 081 and 082. In May, a North Wales DMU passenger diagram was converted to locomotive haulage on Mondays to Fridays, comprising the 09:42 Llandudno - Manchester Piccadilly, 13:30 return, 16:42 Llandudno - Crewe, 20:30 Crewe - Bangor and 22.45 Bangor - Llandudno Junction. At least five different class 24s were recorded on this diagram during the summer. Additionally, on Saturday 10 June 24082 worked a Llandudno Junction – London Euston relief train all the way to London due to a lack of a replacement locomotive at Crewe.

By January 1979, only three locomotives remained in use – 24063, 081 and 082. 24082 was withdrawn on 1 March and 24063 on 9 April, leaving 24081 the last in service. The final recorded passenger duty of a Class 24 was on 2 August 1979 when 24081 rescued 40129 at Colwyn Bay on the 18:05 Holyhead – Euston, hauling the train as far as Crewe.

Cutting up of some Class 24s was carried out at Swindon Works on the Western Region, an area which had never received an allocation of Class 24s. The first locomotives were 24042, 24045, 24048 and 24050 which were moved from Derby Works in December 1975, and the last of the 67 Class 24s cut up at Swindon was 24084 in early December 1978.

The very last Class 24 to be withdrawn from operational service was 24081. This locomotive, allocated to Crewe Diesel Depot had been considered something of a celebrity, lasting over a year after the previous withdrawal of 24063 on 9 April 1979. 24081 was finally withdrawn in October 1980 having worked its last revenue earning train, the 05.43 Grange - Shotwick freight on 7 January 1980, and then making guest appearances at Nuneaton, Crewe Works Open Day, and Southport.

== Preservation ==
Four locomotives have been preserved.

Numbers (current in bold)			Name	Image	Livery	Location	Notes
**D5032**	24032		Helen Turner		BR Green	North Yorkshire Moors Railway	Undergoing Overhaul
**D5054**	24054		Phil Southern		BR Green	East Lancashire Railway	Operational
**D5061**	24061	97201	Experiment		BR Green	North Yorkshire Moors Railway	Stored awaiting overhaul
D5081	24081	**5081**			BR Blue	Gloucestershire Warwickshire Railway	Final locomotive withdrawn from traffic in 1980. Operational following bogie overhaul

== Accidents ==
- D5146 was hauling a freight train that was derailed near Weedon, Northamptonshire on 1 April 1963. The accident was due to a defective wagon. An express passenger train collided with the derailed wagons.
- D5002 was involved in the 1967 Stechford rail crash.
- D5122 was involved in a serious accident at Castlecary, Dunbartonshire in 1968.
- 5028 was involved in the Chester General rail crash in 1972.

== Models ==
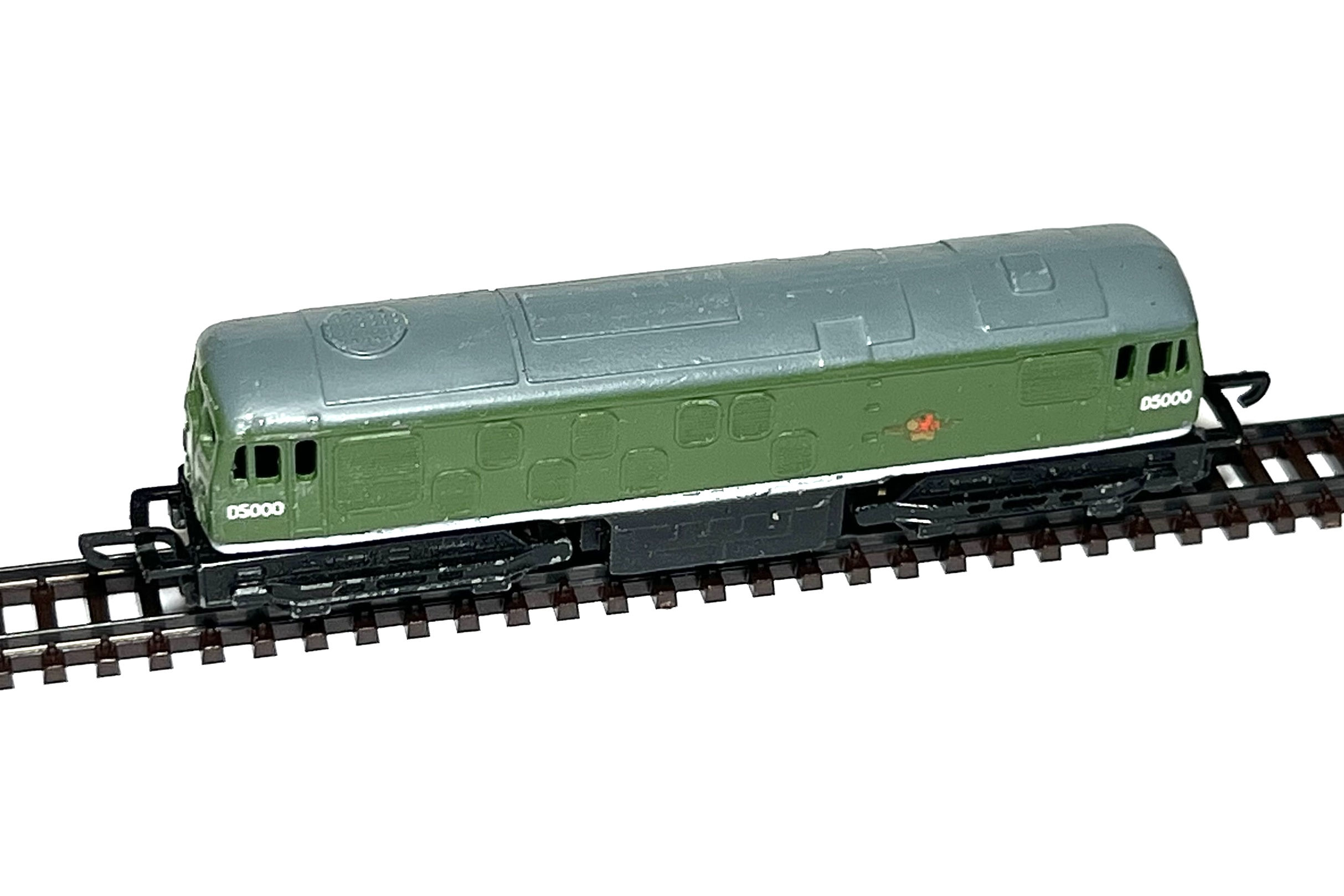
Treble-O-Lectric Class 24 model in OOO gauge with die-cast housing

Between 1960 and 1965 the Class 24 was available in OOO gauge (2 mm scale) as part of the Lone Star "Treble-O-Lectric" range of Die Cast Machine Tools models in both powered and unpowered versions.

Bachmann Branchline have produced a 00 gauge variant of the class 24 several times with recent releases listed on the Bachmann website. Sutton Locomotive Workshop also produces 00 gauge, super detail variant of the class 24.

== References and sources ==
=== Sources ===
- Webb, Brian (1978). Sulzer Diesel Locomotives of British Rail. David & Charles. ISBN 0715375148.
- Williams, Alan; Percival, David (1977). British Railways Locomotives and Multiple Units including Preserved Locomotives 1977. Shepperton: Ian Allan Ltd. ISBN 0-7110-0751-9.
- ABC of British Railways Locomotives, summer 1966 Edition. Ian Allan Ltd. 1966.
