= Landore TMD =

Railway traction maintenance depot in Landore, Swansea, Wales

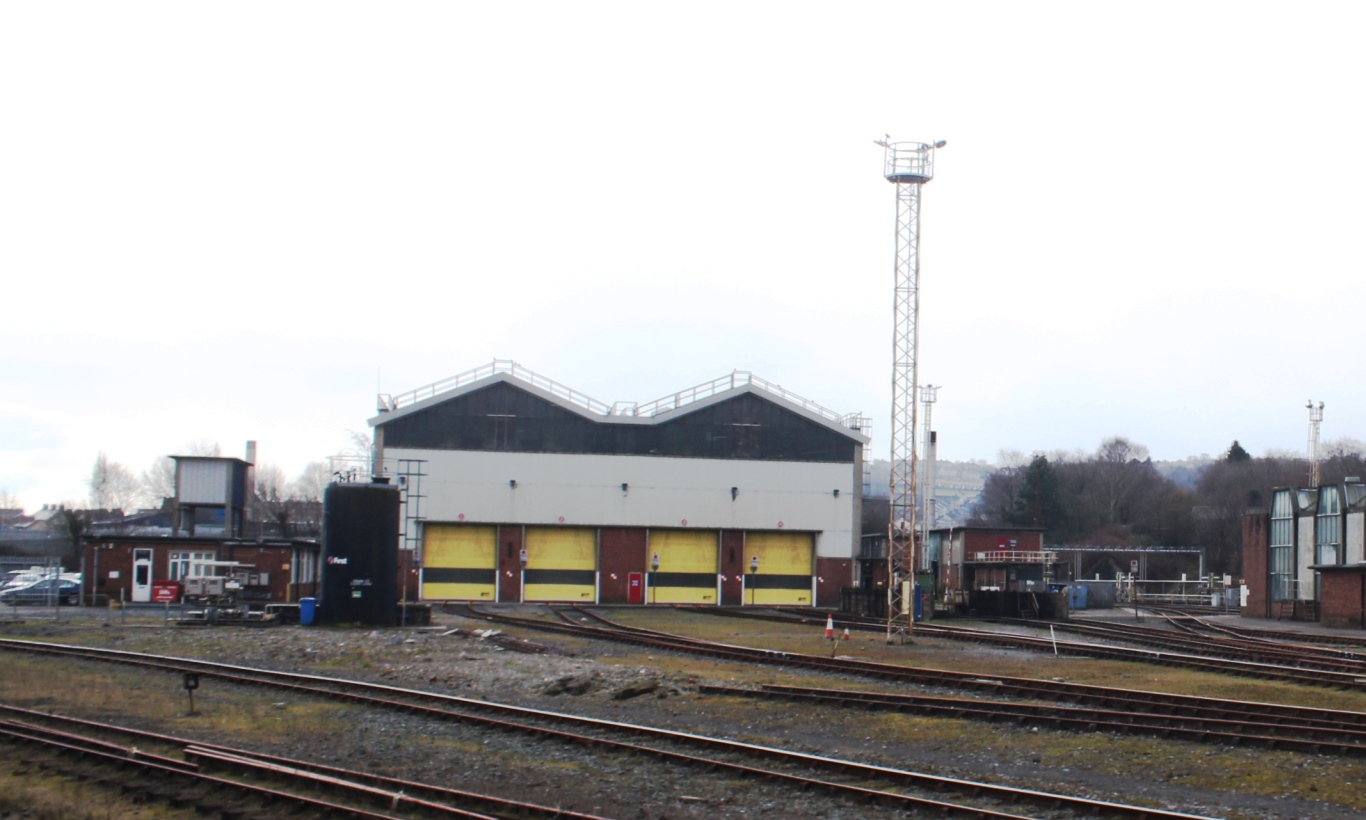
- Interactive map of Landore TMD

Location
- Location: Landore, Wales
- Coordinates: 51.640°N 3.940°W
- OS grid: SS657953

Characteristics
- Owner: Network Rail
- Operator: Chrysalis Rail
- Depot code: LE (1973-Present)

History
- Former depot code: LDR; 87E (1948-1969); 87A (1969-1973)
- Former rolling stock: GWR 2251 Class; GWR 2800 Class; GWR Star class; GWR Castle class; GWR 4200 Class; GWR 4300 Class; GWR Hall class; GWR 5100 Class; GWR 5400 Class; GWR 5600 Class; GWR 5700 Class; GWR 6400 Class; GWR 7200 Class; GWR 9400 Class; BR Class 03; BR Class 08; BR Class 37; HST; BR Class 47; BR Class 52; BR Class 140

Landore TMD is a railway traction maintenance depot situated in Landore, a district of Swansea, Wales. There was a shed for steam locomotives here, and in 1963 British Rail opened a purpose-built diesel depot. Under privatisation the depot was operated by Great Western Railway to service its fleet of InterCity 125s until it closed in December 2018. The site reopened in September 2019 as a rolling stock refurbishment centre.

== History ==
The Great Western Railway built a shed at Landore in 1932.

Under British Rail, Landore shed was given the shed code 87E and from 1949 all locomotives allocated there bore a small plate showing this code. In 1950 there were 60 locomotives allocated to Swansea of which 34 were tank locomotives. By 1959 the total number had risen to 68 but only 33 of these were shunters. The steam shed was closed in June 1961, and in 1963 a new purpose-build diesel depot was opened. Under the BR TOPS system introduced in 1973 this new depot was given the depot code LE.

In 1979, there were 24 shunters allocated to Landore, and 54 main-line locomotive, predominantly Class 37s. Of the eight Class 03s allocated, five were assigned to working the Burry Port and Gwendraeth Valley Railway, remaining at the stabling point west of Llanelli station when not working, while the 16 Class 08s worked at various locations from being station pilot at Carmarthen to various locations in the Swansea area, with those working in the dock areas being fitted with Radio Telephones. In addition, shunters were hired out in the locality for use by the National Coal Board or in local steelworks or oil facilities.

The depot held its first open day on 30 August 1980. At the time, the depot was operating 24 hours a day and consisted of a 70,000 imperial gallons (320,000 L) fuelling point, Servicing Shed and a four-road Maintenance Shed fitted with two 3.5 long tons (3.6 t) overhead cranes. The depot was also the base for a 45 long tons (46 t) steam crane.

In the 21st century, the depot was operated by Great Western Railway to service its fleet of InterCity 125 trains. With the withdrawal of the InterCity 125, Landore depot closed in December 2018, with the replacement Class 800s being serviced at the newly opened Maliphant depot.

In September 2019, Chrysalis Rail reopened the site as a rolling stock refurbishment centre, its first project being on Abellio ScotRail Class 156 units. It has since worked on some Transport for Wales Rail Class 153 units.
