= Inverness TMD =

Traction maintenance depot in Inverness, Scotland

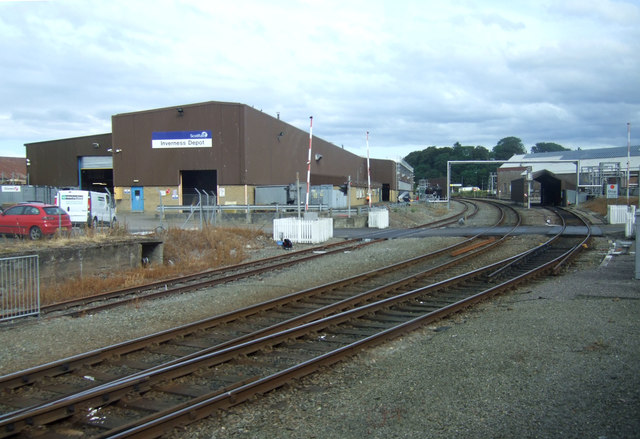
- Inverness Rail Depot
- Interactive map of Inverness TMD

Location
- Location: Inverness, Highland, Scotland
- Coordinates: 57.4822°N 4.2213°W
- OS grid: NH668457

Characteristics
- Owner: Network Rail
- Operator: ScotRail
- Depot code: IS (1973-present)
- Type: Diesel, DMU

History
- Post-grouping: British Railways
- Former depot code: 60A (1948-1973)

Inverness TMD is a railway traction maintenance depot situated in Inverness, Scotland. The depot, visible from Inverness station, is operated by ScotRail. The current depot code is IS. Previously the shed code was 60A. 37025, owned by the Scottish Thirty-Seven Group is named 'Inverness TMD'.

== Allocation ==
- Class 08 X 2
- Class 158, 158701 to 158722
- Independent Drift Snowploughs, ADB 965234 and ADB 965243
