= British Rail Class 66 =

Class of diesel electric locomotives

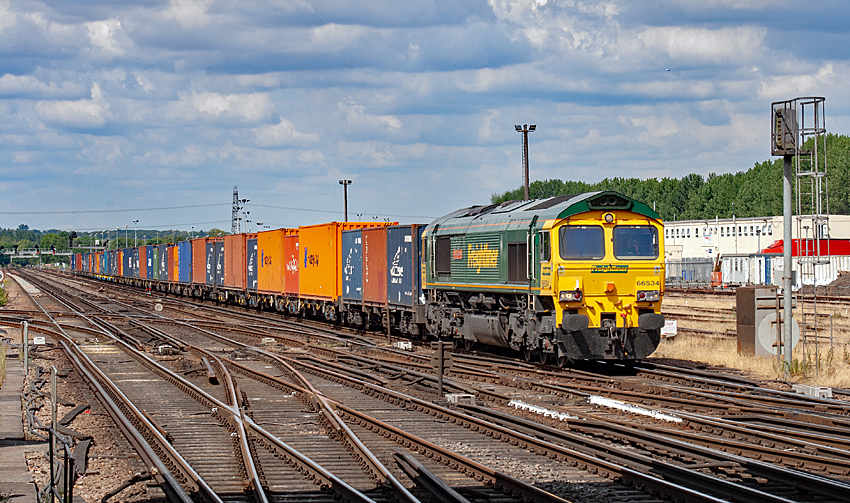
- A Freightliner Class 66 at Eastleigh
Type and origin
- Power type: Diesel-electric
- Builder: GM Electro-Motive Division; (later Electro-Motive Diesel), at London, Ontario, Canada, and Muncie, Indiana, USA
- Model: JT42CWR (Note: Locomotives produced from 2006 onwards, including those of Series 66 imported from continental Europe, are model JT42CWRM.)
- Build date: 1998–2008; 2014–2015
- Total produced: 480 from UK orders, excluding Series 66 imports
Specifications
- Configuration
  - UIC: Co′Co′
  - Commonwealth: Co-Co
- Gauge: 1,435 mm (4 ft 8 1/2 in) standard gauge
- Bogies: EMD HTCR-E
- Length: 21.39 m (70 ft 2 in)
- Width: 2.63 m (8 ft 8 in)
- Height: 3.91 m (12 ft 10 in)
- Loco weight: Original specification: 127 t (125 LT; 140 ST); UIC II and EU Stage IIIA spec.: 129.6 t (128 LT; 143 ST)
- Fuel capacity: Original specification: 8,180 L (1,799 imp gal; 2,161 US gal); UIC II and EU Stage IIIA spec.: 5,670 L (1,247 imp gal; 1,498 US gal)
- Sandbox cap.: EU Stage IIIA specification: 340 L (21,000 in^{3})
- Prime mover: EMD 12N-710; Original specification: 12N-710G3B-EC; UIC II specification: 12N-710G3B-U2; EU Stage IIIA specification: 12N-710G3B-T2
- Engine type: Two-stroke V12 diesel
- Aspiration: Turbocharged
- Displacement: 139.6 L (8,520 in^{3})
- Alternator: EMD AR8/CA6
- Traction motors: 6 × EMD D43TRC
- MU working: AAR system (Note: Also used by Classes 59, 67, 68 (numbers 68008–68015 only), 69, 70, and 73/9.)
- Train heating: None
- Loco brake: Air
- Train brakes: Westinghouse air brake
- Safety systems: AWS; TPWS; ETCS (Note: Locomotive 66039 only, as part of 'first in class' testing for the East Coast Main Line digital signalling programme.)
- Couplers: Screw coupler
Performance figures
- Maximum speed: 75 mph (120 km/h)
- Power output: Total: 2,400 kW (3,200 hp); At rails: 1,850 kW (2,480 hp)
- Tractive effort
  - Starting: 409 kN (92,000 lb_{f})
  - Continuous: 260 kN (58,000 lb_{f}) at 15.9 mph (25.6 km/h)
- Brakeforce: 68 t (67 LT; 75 ST)
Career
- Operators: Colas Rail; DB Cargo UK; Direct Rail Services; Freightliner; GB Railfreight
- Numbers: 66001–66250; 66301–66305; 66411–66434; 66501–66599; 66601–66625; 66701–66799; 66846–66850; 66951–66957
- Nicknames: Shed, Ying Ying
- Axle load class: Route Availability 7
- First run: 2 June 1998
- Disposition: In service
- References to "UIC II" and "EU Stage IIA" relate to emissions control regulations set by the UIC and EU, respectively. In general, and without regard for subsequent modifications, locomotives ordered before 31 December 2002 will be original specification, while those ordered after that date will be either UIC II or EU Stage IIA specification.

The British Rail Class 66 is a type of six-axle diesel-electric freight locomotive developed in part from the Class 59, for use on UK railways. Since its introduction the class has been successful and has been sold to British and other European railway companies. In Continental Europe it is marketed as the EMD Class 66 (JT42CWR).

== History ==
=== Background ===
On the privatisation of British Rail's freight operations in 1996, Wisconsin Central Transportation Systems under the control of Ed Burkhardt bought a number of the newly privatised rail freight companies: Transrail Freight, Mainline Freight, Loadhaul, and later, Railfreight Distribution and Rail Express Systems; thus controlling 93% of UK rail freight. After a public relations exercise involving the input of the general public, the company was named English Welsh & Scottish Railway (EWS).

EWS inherited a fleet of 1,600, mainly diesel, locomotives, with an average age of over 30 years; 300 had been cannibalised for spares. Typical of the fleet, the 2,580 hp (1,920 kW) Class 47s needed a major overhaul every seven years, costing £400,000; yet had an average daily availability of less than 65% with only 16 days between major failures. To enable it to offer its stated lower pricing to customers, EWS needed to reduce operating costs and increase availability.

=== Order and specification ===
After reviewing the existing privately commissioned Class 59, which was more powerful, highly reliable and with lower operating costs, EWS approached its builder Electro-Motive Diesel (EMD), then a division of General Motors. EMD offered their JT42CWR model, which had the same loading gauge-passing bodyshell as the Class 59. The engine and traction motors were different models to enable higher speeds, and the Class 66s incorporated General Motors' version of a "self-steering bogie" ("radial truck", in American usage), designed to reduce track wear and increase adhesion on curves.

Placing what was termed as "the biggest British loco order since steam days", EWS placed an order for 250 units in May 1996 to be built at the EMD plant in London, Ontario, Canada at a cost of £375 million. Financed by Locomotion Capital (later Angel Trains), the first locomotives were ready in early 1998; the fastest delivery of an all-new locomotive type by GM. Initially, the locomotives were expected to be allocated the TOPS Class 61, but the Class 66 designation was confirmed in July 1996.

The EMD 710 12-cylinder diesel engine is a development of a two-stroke engine used for over 20 years, whilst the EM2000 control equipment is the same as that used on the Iarnród Éireann 201 Class. EWS reduced the locomotive's time into operation through specifying cab systems laid out like the Class 59, whilst increasing availability with a fuel tank of 8,180 litres (1,800 imp gal; 2,160 US gal) capacity, compared to 3,470 litres (760 imp gal; 920 US gal) on a standard Class 47.

=== United Kingdom ===
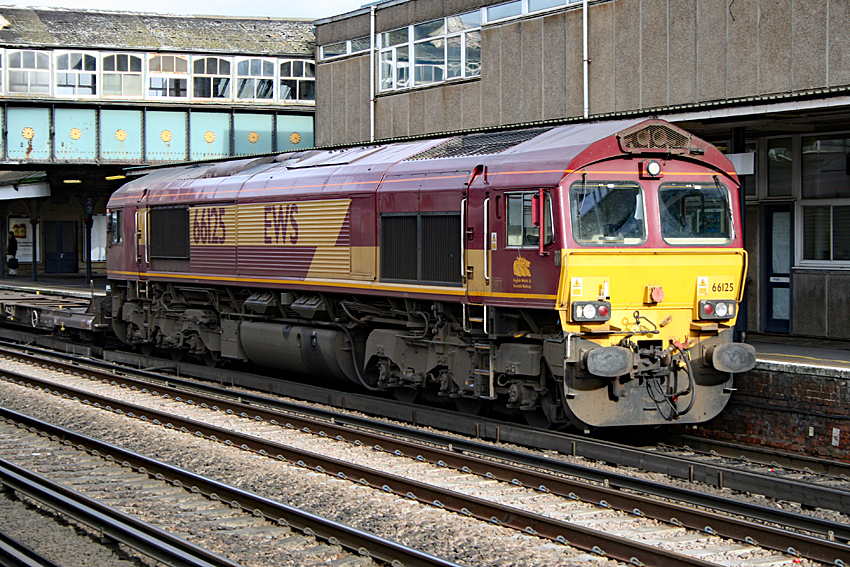
66125 in EWS livery at Eastleigh

The first locomotive shipped to the UK arrived at Immingham in June 1998 and was taken to Derby for testing. The second was taken to AAR's Pueblo Test Centre for endurance testing, before shipping to the UK. The locomotives then shipped at a rate of 11 per month into the UK via Newport Docks, until the order was completed in December 2001. After unloading, EWS engineers then simply took off the tarpaulin, unblocked the suspension, and finally as each was shipped with water and fuel, connected the batteries, before starting the engine and handing the locomotive into service. The ability to simply start up '66s' on the dockside and drive them under their own power to depots to enter service was nothing short of a revelation compared with many other BR locomotives, particularly the British Rail Class 60s.

Each locomotive is specified and guaranteed to 95% availability, aiming for a minimum of 180 days mean time between failures. It is designed to cover 1.6 million km between major rebuilds, equivalent to 18 years' service, with each major rebuild costed at £200,000.

In 1998 Freightliner placed an order for locomotives. They were followed by GB Railfreight, and then Direct Rail Services. The last of more than 500 built over an 18-year period was No 66779, Evening Star, delivered to GB Railfreight in spring 2016.

Although sometimes unpopular with many rail enthusiasts, due to their ubiquity and having caused the displacement of several older types of (mostly) British built locomotives, their high reliability has helped rail freight to remain competitive. Rail enthusiasts labelled the type "The Red Death" as they displaced many older types of locomotive whilst also acquiring the nicknames of "sheds" for the EWS (now DBS) locomotives (due to their upturned roof looking like a shed roof) with the Freightliner locomotives being called "Freds" as a portmanteau of Freightliner and Shed.

=== Continental Europe ===
The Class 66 design has also been introduced to Continental Europe where it is currently certified for operations in Germany, the Netherlands, Belgium, Luxembourg, Sweden, Norway, Denmark, France, and Poland, with certification pending in the Czech Republic and Italy. They currently operate on routes in Sweden and Denmark and between Germany, Belgium, The Netherlands and Poland. As a result of its well-known British identity, EMD Europe markets the locomotive as "Series 66".

=== UK importation ===
By 2011, following an increase in UK rail traffic after the 2008 Global Economic Crisis, EMD were struggling to source critical components of the locomotive — specifically castings. The final units of the Class 66 were produced in the London, Ontario plant that year following an industrial dispute and the introduction of new EU crash and emissions regulations which culminated in the cessation of production.

Due to a reduction in European freight volumes and migration of several operators to electric traction using multi-current locomotives such as the Alstom Traxx and Siemens Eurosprinter, since mid-2012, a number of EMD Series 66 locomotives have been imported by GBRf and converted to UK type specifications. To date:

- 2012: Three ex-Dutch locos, which have been numbered 66747–749. The former identities of these were DE6316, DE6313 and DE6315 respectively.
- 2013: Two ex-German "Rush Rail" locomotives, which have been numbered 66750 and 66751. The former identities of these were DE6606 (also used in Sweden with the number T664025) and DE6609 (also 2906) respectively
- 2019: Three ex-Swedish locomotives, which have been numbered 66790–792. The former identities of these were T66403, T66404 and T66405 respectively.
- 2024: Eleven locomotives from France, which have been numbered 66306–316.

=== Emission compliance ===
Numbers 66752–779 were the last Class 66s ordered for service in Great Britain because of increasingly stringent emission regulations. 66779 (since renumbered 66689) was the last Class 66 ever to be built. Although the Class 66s meet stage 3a of the regulations, they do not meet stage 3b. Stage 3b would have required additional exhaust treatment equipment that could not easily be accommodated within the UK loading gauge. The same restrictions apply to the Class 68 and Class 70. The restriction does not apply to second-hand locomotives, provided that they are imported from within the European Union. The purpose of the regulation was to put a cap on the total number of non-compliant locomotives in the EU.

== Current operators ==
Class 66 operators in Great Britain are:

- Colas Rail
- DB Cargo UK
- Direct Rail Services (DRS)
- Freightliner
- GB Railfreight
- Heavy Haul Rail

=== DB Cargo UK ===
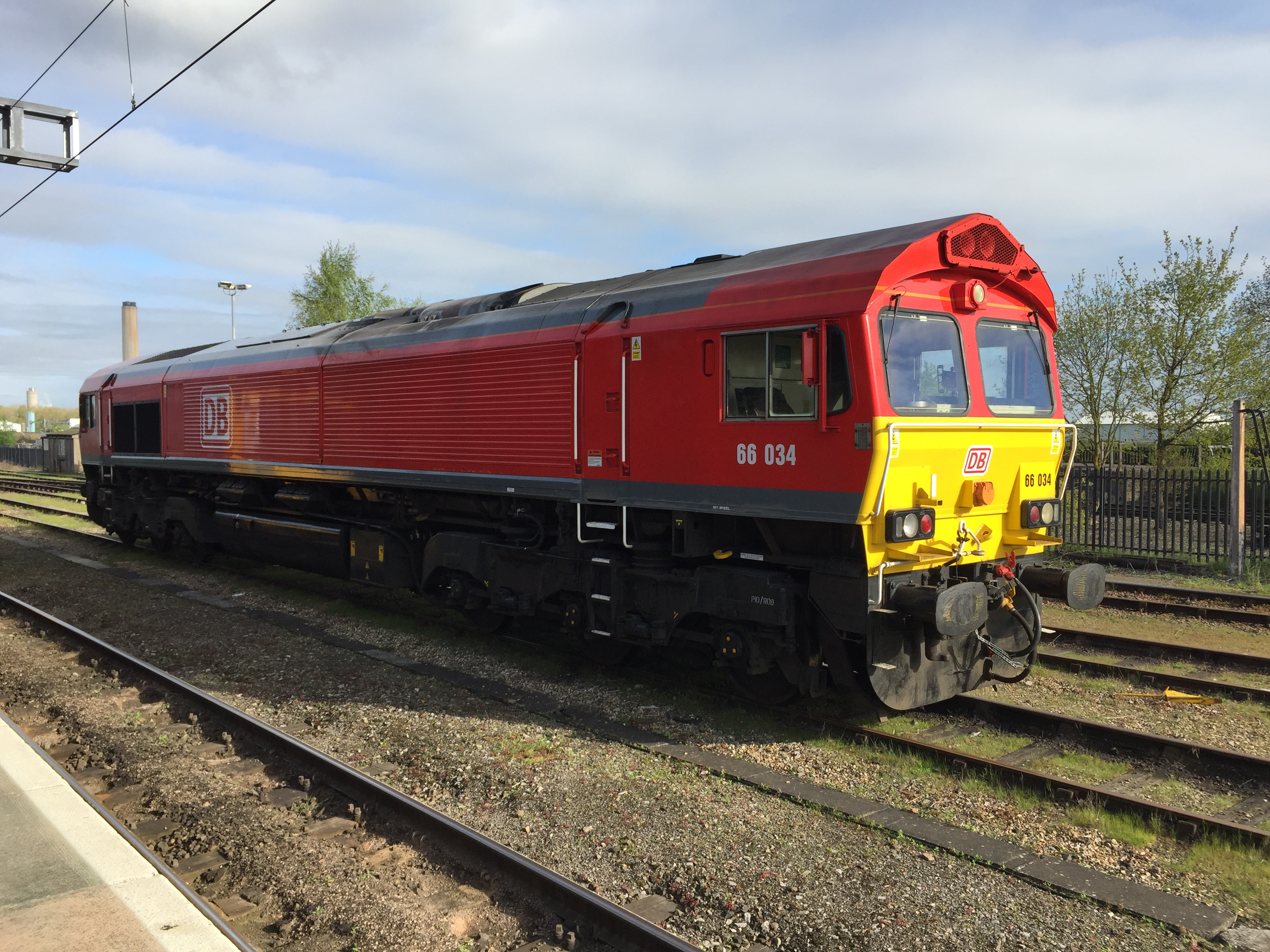
Class 66 locomotive 66034 in DB livery at Didcot Parkway

DB Cargo UK bought out EWS. Their Class 66 fleet includes four locomotives capable of banking heavy trains over the Lickey Incline. On these specific locomotives, the knuckle coupler has been modified to allow remote releasing from inside the cab, whilst in motion. It also includes fifteen locomotives fitted with RETB signalling equipment, for working in northern Scotland and RETB-fitted branchlines. A few DB Cargo UK Class 66s are now working in Europe as part of DB Cargo France and DB Cargo Polska.

=== Freightliner ===
After Freightliner sold its intermodal container business to CMA CGM in January 2026, the Freightliner fleet was split, 46 remained with Freightliner with 62 moving to Heavy Haul Rail.

=== GB Railfreight ===
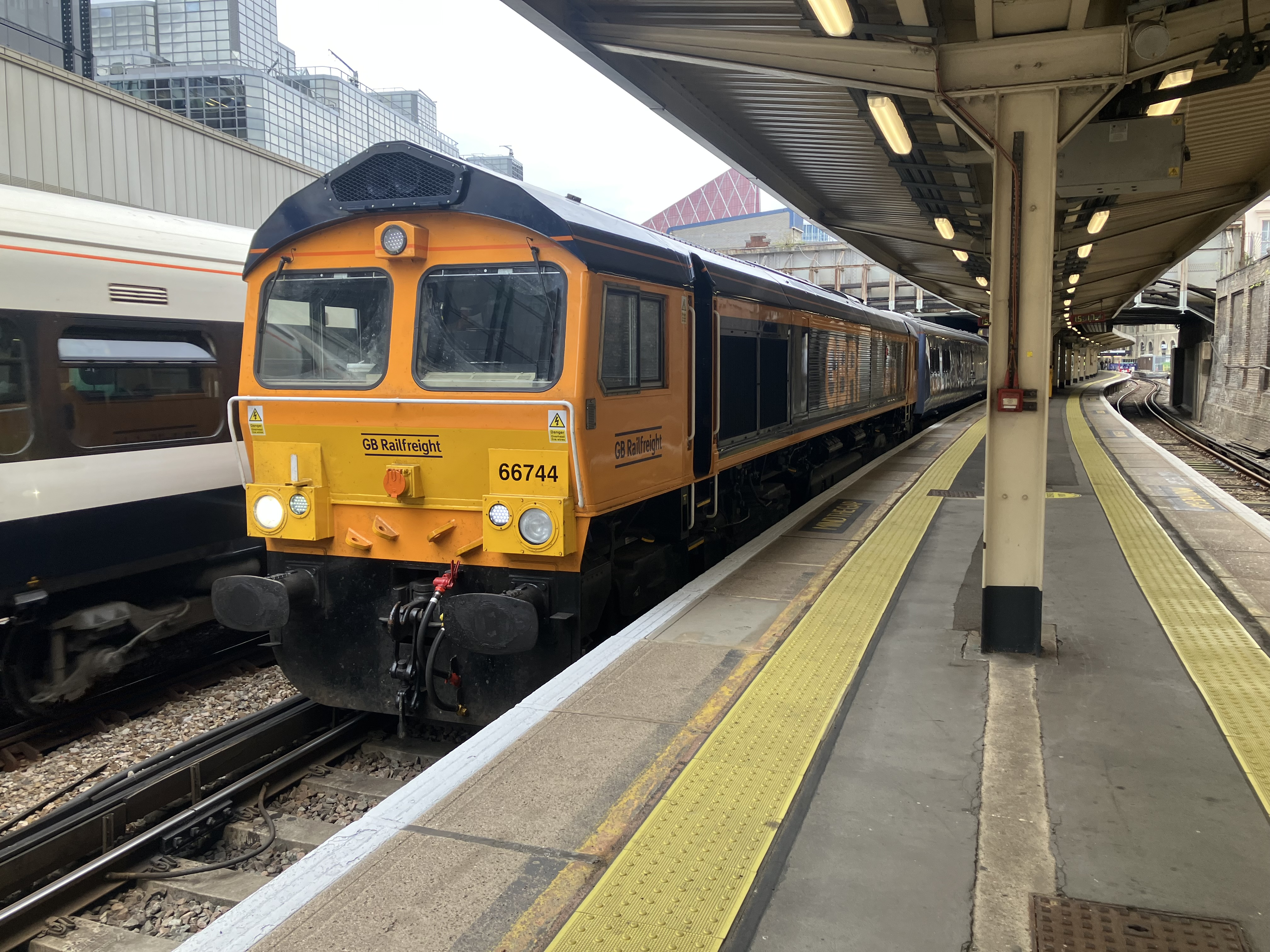
GB Railfreight 66744 waiting at London Victoria station.

GB Railfreight initially leased seventeen Class 66/7 locomotives, before increasing its fleet to 32. During April 2006 five more low-emission locomotives (numbered 66718-722) were delivered, liveried for use on the Metronet/Transport for London contracts. A further order for five more locomotives (66723-727) was delivered in early 2007, and another five locomotives (66728–732) in April 2008. 66733-746 are formed of Class 66s from Direct Rail Services, Freightliner and Colas Rail. In 2011 66720 was painted in a special "Rainbow" livery. In June 2012, 66734 derailed at Loch Treig whilst working 6S45 North Blyth–Fort William and was consequently cut up on site and scrapped.

In September 2013, GB Railfreight announced a new order of a further 8 Class 66/7 locomotives from EMD, the first of the class to be built at EMD's Muncie, Indiana plant. On 2 February GBRf ordered a further 13 locomotives. These 21 locomotives are numbered 66752–772. Numbers 66752–756 were shipped from America and arrived at Newport Docks in July 2014. No. 66752 has been named The Hoosier State, a nickname for Indiana. A further seven locomotives (66773–779) were later added to the fleet, utilising six power units that had been in the UK, plus one recovered from the scrapped 66734. The presence of these power units in the UK circumvented European emission compliance regulations and permitted them to be exported to EMD Muncie for installation in further class 66 bodyshells.

The final Class 66 built, 66779, remained under a tarpaulin until 10 May 2016 when it was revealed at the NRM York with a special livery and nameplates to commemorate the fact it is the final Class 66 ever built for the British market. The locomotive has been painted in BR Lined Green and named Evening Star, in reference to BR Standard Class 9F 92220 Evening Star which was the last BR steam locomotive to be built. It was unveiled in a special ceremony inside the Great Hall at the National Railway Museum in York on 10 May 2016 before staying there opposite its namesake, No. 92220, for two weeks. At the same ceremony, the CEO of GBRf, John Smith, handed the curator of the National Railway Museum a document offering 66779 to the national collection when it is retired in about 40 years time.

In addition to those locomotives sourced from domestic operators (Direct Rail Services, Freightliner, Colas Rail and DB Cargo UK), eight further locomotives have been obtained from European operators. A further five have been purchased from Heavy Haul Power International and will be transferred from Germany beginning in April 2021. The locos will go to Doncaster to be converted to UK specification.

== Former operators ==
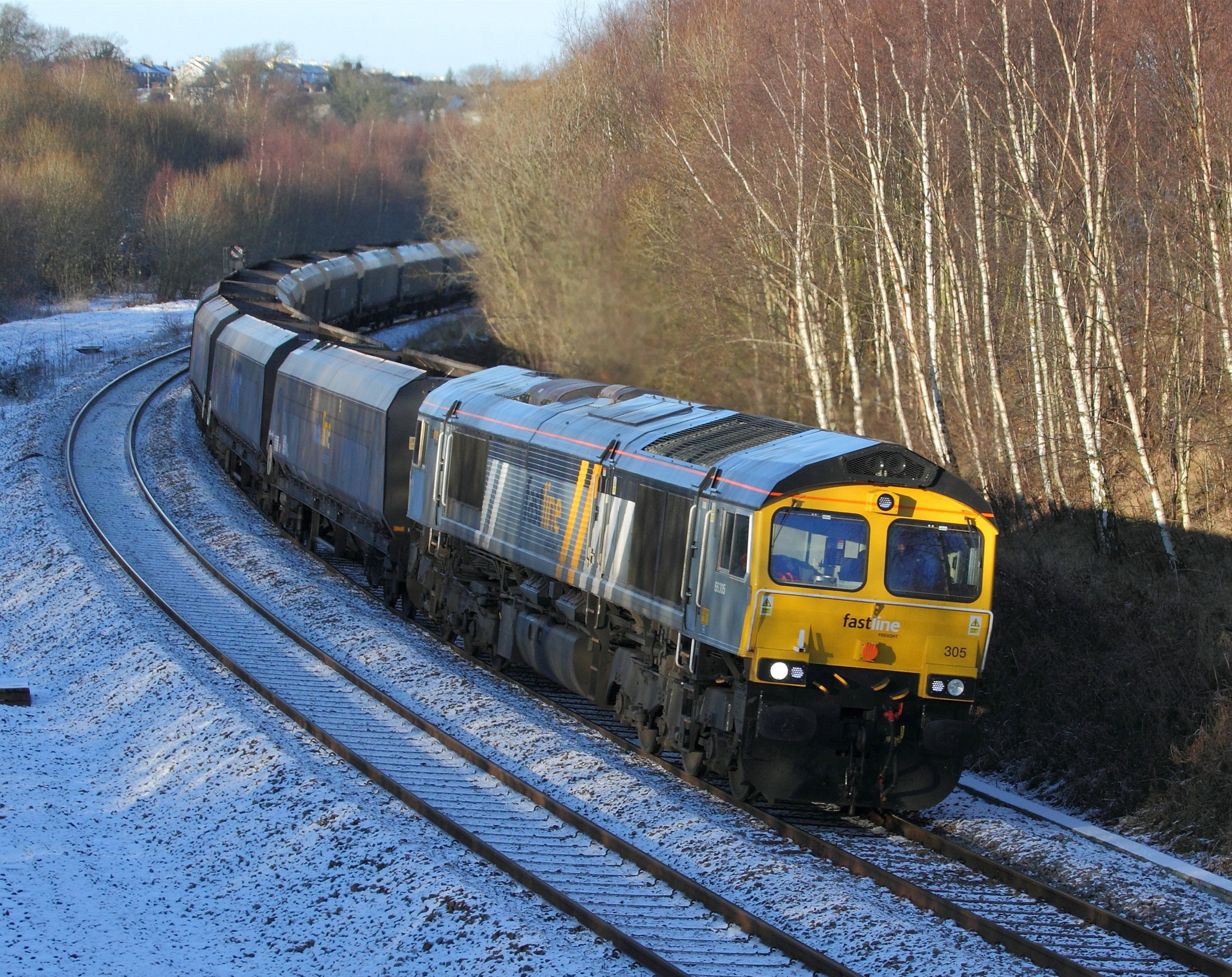
66305 in Fastline livery in the snow

Former Class 66 operators include:

- Advenza Freight
- Fastline

Fastline operated intermodal services between Doncaster and Birmingham International Railfreight Terminal (BIFT), and Thamesport, in North Kent, using refurbished Class 56 locomotives. The company ordered five Class 66/3 locomotives to operate a coal flow from Hatfield Colliery, which were delivered in 2008.

Following the demise of Jarvis in 2010, and Fastline going into administration on 29 March 2010, these locomotives were placed in storage, being towed to Direct Rail Services' Carlisle Kingmoor and Crewe Gresty Lane depots for storage. During 2011, DRS repainted the five ex-Fastline locomotives and added them to their own fleet, keeping their original numbers.

== Future operators ==
In January 2026, DB Cargo UK announced that it was to sell 25 locomotives to Romanian operator Grup Feroviar Român.

== Driver reception ==
The British train drivers' union ASLEF has complained that the locomotives are unfit and unsafe to work in, citing excessive heat, noise levels and poor seating.

In April 2007, ASLEF proposed a ban on their members driving the locomotives during the British summer 2007 period. Keith Norman, ASLEF's general secretary, described the cabs as "unhealthy, unsafe and unsatisfactory". Research showed that in July 2006, when the weather had been extremely hot, the number of incidents where a driver had passed a signal at danger (SPAD) increased. EWS entered into discussions and made amendments to a series of trial locomotives, GB Railfreight and Freightliner also investigated cab improvements. In June 2007, progress on the issue led ASLEF to withdraw its threat of industrial action.

In Norway, CargoNet related complaints about the noise levels in the CD66 variant of the Class 66 resulted in higher pay rates for drivers.

== Accidents and incidents ==
- On 28 February 2001, 66521 was involved in the 2001 Great Heck rail crash/Selby rail crash which resulted in 10 deaths including the driver Stephen Dunn. The locomotive was written off and scrapped as a result of major damage sustained in the accident.
- On 9 February 2006, a freight train hauled by English Welsh & Scottish 66017, derailed at Brentingby Junction near Melton Mowbray. Having passed a signal at danger, the locomotive and the first three wagons were derailed at catch points at the end of the Up Goods Loop. There were no injuries.

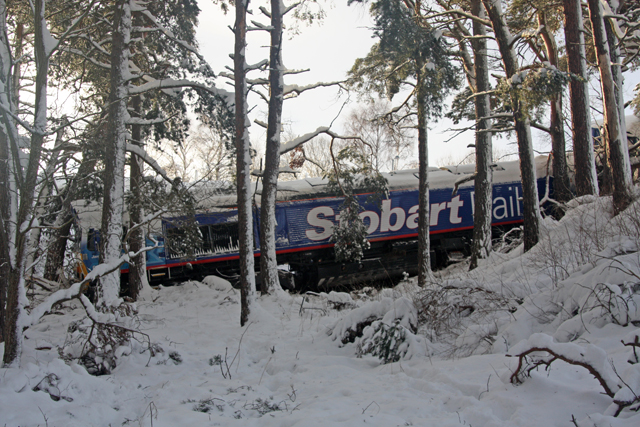
66 048 lies in the snow and trees following the Carrbridge derailment.

- On 4 January 2010, a freight train, hauled by 66048, derailed at Carrbridge in snowy weather, blocking the Highland Main Line. Having passed a signal at danger the train was derailed at trap points, subsequently falling down an embankment into trees and injuring the two crew members. The locomotive was hauling container flats from Inverness to Mossend Yard on behalf of Stobart Rail. The line was reopened on 12 January.
- On 21 November 2011, 66111 derailed between Exeter Central and Exeter St Davids on working an engineering works service.
- On 28 June 2012, GBRf operated 66734 derailed at Loch Treig whilst working the 6S45 North Blyth to Fort William Alcan Tanks. Due to its position and the environmental risks associated with recovery, after agreement from owners Porterbrook it was cut-up on site and the mechanics recycled as spare parts.
- On 1 August 2015, 66428 was hauling an engineering train that ran into the rear of another engineering train at Logan, Ayrshire. It was severely damaged. The train that was run into was hauled by 66305.
- On 14 August 2017, 66713 was hauling a freight train that derailed near Ely, due to defective suspension on the wagon that was first to derail. The railway between Ely and Peterborough was closed for a week.
- On 4 September 2018, 66230 was hauling a freight train which collided with a vehicle on a level crossing at Dollands Moor Freight Yard, Kent. One cab was extensively damaged in the post-impact fire. The locomotive was stored in Toton TMD.
- On 23 January 2020, 66154 was hauling a freight train which derailed at Wanstead Park and ran for 2.5 miles (4.0 km) before stopping near Walthamstow Queen's Road station.
- On 23 March 2020, 66057 ran through a buffer stop at the end of a siding at Bromsgrove and was derailed. The derailment caused the locomotive to foul the main line, and a Class 170 diesel multiple unit, unit number 170 107, collided with the derailed locomotive at around 85 miles per hour (137 km/h). No one was injured. The driver of the locomotive was subsequently convicted of an offence contrary to the Health and Safety at Work etc. Act 1974. He was sentenced to 8 months' imprisonment, suspended for 18 months.
- On 11 November 2020, 66603 was hauling a freight train that derailed at Sheffield. The derailment was caused by broken rail fastenings which allowed the track to spread.
- On 19 August 2021, 66754 was hauling a freight train which collided with a tractor on a level crossing between March and Whittlesea in Cambridgeshire. The locomotive and three wagons were derailed.
- On 24 December 2021, 66779, working a train from Hams Hall (near Birmingham) to London Gateway derailed on the down Thames Haven line while on the approach to the port near to Stanford-le-Hope in Essex.
- On 5 July 2022, 66729 was hauling a freight train that passed a signal at danger and ran into the rear of another freight train near Loversall Carr Jn, Doncaster.
- On 19 October 2022 66739 was hauling a loaded cement train from Clitheroe Castle Cement Gb to Carlisle N.Y. when eight wagons derailed at Petteril Bridge Junction with one crashing into the River Petteril and one half way down the embankment.
- On 5 April 2024, 66776 passed a red signal and was derailed at West Ealing.

== Sub-classes ==
Minor differences between different orders, and different operating companies have resulted in a number of subclasses being defined.

Subclass	Quantity	Loco nos.	Operators	Comments
Class 66/0	223	66001–007; 66009–015; 66017–030; 66032–045; 66047; 66049–057; 66059–080; 66082–090; 66092–107; 66109–121; 66123–125; 66127–131; 66133–140; 66142–146; 66148; 66150-155; 66157-160; 66162-163; 66165-166; 66168-170; 66172-182; 66183; 66185-193; 66195–220; 66222-229; 66231–237; 66239–249	DB Cargo UK	The original order of 250.; 65 locomotives were transferred to subsidiary Euro Cargo Rail during the English, Welsh & Scottish Railways era: 66010, 66022, 66026, 66028, 66029, 66032, 66033, 66036, 66038, 66042, 66045, 66049, 66052, 66062, 66064, 66071–073, 66123, 66179, 66190, 66191, 66193, 66195, 66201–205, 66208–220, 66222–226, 66228, 66229, 66231–236, 66239–247, 66249.; 15 locomotives have been sent to the Polish division of the DB Cargo group, DB Cargo Polska: 66146, 66153, 66157, 66159, 66163, 66166, 66173, 66178, 66180, 66189, 66196, 66220, 66227, 66237, 66248.; Others make regular visits to the UK for attention at Toton depot.; In December 2017 the company sold ten of its domestic fleet Class 66s to GB Railfreight: 66008, 66016, 66046, 66058, 66081, 66132, 66141, 66184, 66238 and 66250. These were reclassified as Class 66/7 and renumbered 66780–789.; 66048 was withdrawn in 2016 following an accident at Carrbridge; 66230 is in storage at Toton TMD following an accident at Dollands Moor.
Class 66/0	5	66031; 66091; 66108; 66122; 66126	Direct Rail Services	On long-term lease from DB Cargo UK, all in DRS livery.
Class 66/3	16	66301–305; 66306–316	GB Railfreight	Originally ordered by Fastline Freight.; Imported from France.
Class 66/4	10	66411–420	Freightliner	Acquired from Direct Rail Services in 2011. 66411, 66412 & 66417 exported for use by Freightliner PL.
Class 66/4	14	66421-434	Direct Rail Services	Intended use is on intermodal traffic. Occasionally used on nuclear flask traffic.
Class 66/5	81	66501–520; 66522–526; 66528–529; 66531–534; 66536–572; 66585; 66587–594; 66596–599	Freightliner	Replaced Class 47s and Class 57s on Intermodal freight.; 66521 written off after Great Heck rail crash.; 66527, 66530, 66535, 66582, 66583, 66584, 66586 and 66595 have been exported to Poland, the operating subsidiary Freightliner PL.; 66573–581 have been sold to Colas Rail and GB Railfreight and renumbered 66846–850 and 66738–741 respectively.
Class 66/6	28	66601–607; 66610; 66613–623	Freightliner	Top speed of 65 mph (105 km/h) – reduced gearing to cope with heavier oil, aggregates and cement trains.; 66608, 66609, 66611, 66612, 66624 and 66625 have been exported to Poland, the operating subsidiary Freightliner PL.
Class 66/6	10	66651-660	DB Cargo UK	66/0s regeared from February 2024 to replace the remaining DB class 60s in service: 66221/164/194/149/167/156/183/147/171/161 becoming 66651-660 respectively
Class 66/6	4	66687 66689 66693 66694	GB Railfreight	66687/689 regeared from 66777/779; 66693/694 renumbered from 66793/794
Class 66/7	99	66701–776, 66778, 66780-792, 66795-799	GB Railfreight	Operates on coal, intermodal services and also engineering / departmental work for Transport for London and Network Rail on London Underground and National Rail lines.: 66734 was cut up on site after it was involved in a serious derailment at Loch Treig. However, a 'new' 66734 is now part of the GBRf fleet, with this locomotive replacing the original.; 66733–737 were formerly Direct Rail Services 66401–405.; 66738–741 were formerly Freightliner 66578–581.; 66742–746 were formerly Colas Rail 66841–845 and prior to that were numbered 66406–410 when with Direct Rail Services.; 66747–749 are a former Dutch fleet converted at the Midland Railway Centre.; 66750 and 66751 are former Beacon Rail locos from mainland Europe. Converted at the EMD Longport.; 66780–789 were formerly DB Cargo UK 66008, 016, 046, 058, 081, 132, 141, 184, 238 and 250.; 66790–792 were imported by Beacon Rail from Sweden. Converted at the EMD Longport.; 66793–799 were imported by Beacon Rail from mainland Europe.
Class 66/8	5	66846–850	Colas Rail	Formerly Freightliner 66573–577.
Class 66/9	7	66951–957	Freightliner	A lower emission variant – fuel capacity reduced to compensate for the increased weight of other components.

== Names ==
Number	Name	Operator	Notes
66005	Maritime Intermodal One	DB Cargo UK	
66035	Resourceful	DB Cargo UK	Unveiled at the 2018 Severnside Open Day.
66047	Maritime Intermodal Two	DB Cargo UK	
66051	Maritime Intermodal Four	DB Cargo UK	
66090	Maritime Intermodal Six	DB Cargo UK	
66091	accurascale	DB Cargo UK	Named after the model railway company at the DB Cargo UK Rail 200 Heritage Weekend at Midland Railway – Butterley in July 2025
66100	Armistice 100 (1918-2018)	DB Cargo UK	
66142	Maritime Intermodal Three	DB Cargo UK	
66148	Maritime Intermodal Seven	DB Cargo UK	
66162	Maritime Intermodal Five	DB Cargo UK	
66175	Rail Riders Express	DB Cargo UK	Named at Toton on 20 March 2020.
66190	Martin House Children's Hospice	DB Cargo UK	
66200	The Jeremy Vine Show	DB Cargo UK	Named at The Greatest Gathering in Derby after the BBC Radio 2 programme.
66301	Drax Power Station 50 Years	GB Railfreight	
66303	Preston North End	GB Railfreight	Named at Preston.
66307	Ipswich Town	GB Railfreight	
66308	Signalman Willie Taylor	GB Railfreight	Named on 1 May 2024 at Carlisle Station to mark 40 years since he prevented a fatal rail collision.
66413	Lest We Forget (denamed)	Freightliner	Name transferred to 66623 in 2023.
66415	You Are Never Alone	Freightliner	
66418	Patriot	Freightliner	Named in 2016 in honour of the 20,000 railwaymen that lost their lives in the First World War.
66419	Lionesses' Roar	Freightliner	Named in honour of the England women's national football team.
66421	Gresty Bridge TMD	Direct Rail Services	Previously carried by 20305.
66422	Max Joule	Direct Rail Services	Name unveiled at the 2022 Direct Rail Services Open Day.
66424	Driver Paul Scrivens	Direct Rail Services	
66425	Nigel J Kirchstein	Direct Rail Services	
66428	Carlisle Eden Mind	Direct Rail Services	
66429	Charlie Brise	Direct Rail Services	Named after a former DRS employee and TSSA union representative.
66431	Kingmoor TMD	Direct Rail Services	
66433	Carlisle Power Signal Box	Direct Rail Services	
66501	Spirit of 65 – Celebrating 60 years of Freightliner	Freightliner	Named in March 2025 to celebrate 60 years of Freightliner.
66503	The Railway Magazine	Freightliner	Named in 2004 with another plate (Celebrating 125 years 1897–2022) added below in 2022 to celebrate the magazine's anniversary.
66508	City of Doncaster	Freightliner	
66509	Josiah's Wish	Freightliner	
66522	East London Express (denamed)	Freightliner	
66526	Steve Dunn (denamed)	Freightliner	Named after freight driver who was killed in the Selby rail crash.
66528	Madge Elliot MBE (Borders Railway 2015)	Freightliner	Named after veteran rail campaigner Madge Elliot.
66533	Hanjin Express /; Senator Express	Freightliner	Different name carried each side.
66534	OOCL Express	Freightliner	Named on 21 November 2001 at Manchester.
66540	Ruby	Freightliner	
66552	Maltby Raider	Freightliner	Named in 2004 to celebrate Freightliner's achievement of 0.75 million tonnes of coal from Maltby Main Colliery.
66587	As One We Can	Freightliner	Named and repainted in Ocean Network Express' (ONE) pink livery in 2019 to celebrate Freightliner's partnership with ONE.
66594	NYK Spirit of Kyoto	Freightliner	
66614	Poppy	Freightliner	Named in 2016 in honour of the 20,000 railwaymen that lost their lives in the First World War
66619	Derek W Johnson MBE	Freightliner	Named after Chairman of Johnson Stevens Agencies Ltd.
66623	Lest We Forget	Freightliner	Name transferred from 66413 in 2023.
66701	Whitemoor (denamed)	GB Railfreight	Named on 23 May 2004 at Whitemoor depot.
66705	Golden Jubilee	GB Railfreight	Additionally carried a Union Jack in its livery until 2016.
66706	Nene Valley	GB Railfreight	
66708	Glory to Ukraine	GB Railfreight	Named on 6 April 2022 and partially painted in the colours of the Flag of Ukraine.
66709	Sorrento	GB Railfreight	Named and repainted in Mediterranean Shipping Company's corporate colours in 2012 to celebrate the 10-year partnership anniversary with GB Railfreight.
66710	Karen Harrison	GB Railfreight	Named at the Greatest Gathering after the first woman in Britain to be appointed as a train driver.
66711	Sence	GB Railfreight	
66713	The Forest City	GB Railfreight	Named in reference to the Class 66's birthplace in London, Ontario.
66714	Cromer Lifeboat	GB Railfreight	
66715	Valour	GB Railfreight	
66716	Locomotive & Carriage Institution 1911-2011	GB Railfreight	Named on the Nene Valley Railway.
66718	Peter, Lord Hendy of Richmond Hill of Imber in the County of Wiltshire	GB Railfreight	Originally named Sir Peter Hendy CBE in 2013, it was repainted in a black livery with the current name adopted in May 2023.
66719	Michael Portillo	GB Railfreight	Named at the Greatest Gathering after the British journalist and broadcaster that hosted railway documentaries such as Great British Railway Journeys and Great Continental Railway Journeys.
66720	Wascosa	GB Railfreight	
66721	Harry Beck	GB Railfreight	Named after the designer of London Underground's Tube map.
66723	ZA723 Chinook	GB Railfreight	Named after the helicopter in 2008.
66725	Sunderland	GB Railfreight	
66726	Sheffield Wednesday	GB Railfreight	
66728	Institution of Railway Operators	GB Railfreight	
66729	Derby County	GB Railfreight	
66731	Capt. Tom Moore – A True British Inspiration	GB Railfreight	Named in April 2020 in honour of the 100th birthday of Captain Tom Moore.
66733	Cambridge PSB	GB Railfreight	
66734	Platinum Jubilee	GB Railfreight	Repainted in purple livery in 2022 and named to commemorate the Platinum Jubilee of Elizabeth II.
66736	Wolverhampton Wanderers	GB Railfreight	
66738	Huddersfield Town	GB Railfreight	
66739	Bluebell Railway	GB Railfreight	
66740	Sarah	GB Railfreight	Named after Sarah Whurr in 2014, working for GBRF's finance team.
66741	Swanage Railway	GB Railfreight	
66742	Port of Immingham Centenary 1912-2012	GB Railfreight	Unveiled by Michael Portillo.
66744	Crossrail	GB Railfreight	
66747	Made in Sheffield	GB Railfreight	
66748	St Michael's Mount	GB Railfreight	Named and repainted in the "Belmond Britannic Explorer" luxury livery and named in honor of the famous tidal island landmark in Cornwall.
66749	Christopher Hopcroft MBE	GB Railfreight	
66750	Bristol Panel Signal Box	GB Railfreight	
66751	Inspiration Delivered	GB Railfreight	
66752	The Hoosier State	GB Railfreight	A nickname for the American state of Indiana.
66753	EMD Roberts Road	GB Railfreight	
66754	Northampton Saints	GB Railfreight	Named at Wellingborough Aggregates Terminal on 22 April 2015.
66755	Tony Berkeley OBE	GB Railfreight	
66756	Royal Corps of Signals	GB Railfreight	
66757	West Somerset Railway	GB Railfreight	
66758	The Pavior	GB Railfreight	Named in honour of the Worshipful Company of Paviors.
66761	Wensleydale Railway Association 25 years 1990 - 2015	GB Railfreight	Named on 17th July 2015 to honour 25 years of the Wensleydale Railway Association. The locomotive spent a weekend after the naming ceremony hauling passenger services on the 22 mile heritage railway.
66763	Severn Valley Railway	GB Railfreight	
66764	Major John Poyntz Engineer and Railwayman	GB Railfreight	Named on 16 June 2021 in honour of last RE Inspector of Railways.
66765	Julie Carn	GB Railfreight	
66766	Gail Richardson	GB Railfreight	
66767	King’s Cross PSB 1971–2021	GB Railfreight	Named on 25 April 2021 at Kings Cross station.
66769	League Managers Association	GB Railfreight	Carries the Prostate Cancer UK logo. Named in August 2021.
66770	Darius Cheskin	GB Railfreight	
66771	Amanda	GB Railfreight	Named in a ceremony at Cleethorpes station in August 2019 in honour of staff member Amanda Wilson.
66772	Maria	GB Railfreight	Named in a ceremony at Cleethorpes station in August 2019 in honour of staff member Maria Dennison.
66773	Pride of GB Railfreight	GB Railfreight	Name chosen by Matthew Parris in recognition of LGBT+ employees across the rail industry.
66775	HMS Argyll	GB Railfreight	Named in a ceremony at HMNB Devonport in July 2017.
66778	Cambois Depot 25 Years	GB Railfreight	
66779	Evening Star	GB Railfreight	Last class 66 to be built. Gifted to the NRM.
66780	The Cemex Express	GB Railfreight	
66781	1. Darius Cheskin; 2. Ratcliffe Power Station	GB Railfreight	1. Previously carried by 66778.; 2. Named 28 June 2024, to commemorate the last coal train to Ratcliffe-on-Soar.
66783	The Flying Dustman	GB Railfreight	Named in March 2018 to mark the partnership between Biffa and GB Railfreight.
66784	Keighley & Worth Valley Railway	GB Railfreight	
66785	John Ellis	GB Railfreight	
66786	Cambridge University Railway Club	GB Railfreight	
66787	Three Bridges ASC	GB Railfreight	
66789	British Rail 1948-1997	GB Railfreight	Named to commemorate the 70th anniversary of British Rail and painted in BR 'large logo' blue.
66790	Louise	GB Railfreight	
66791	Settle & Carlisle 150	GB Railfreight	To celebrate 150 years of freight on the Settle to Carlisle line
66792	Collaboration	GB Railfreight	
66794	Steve Hannam	GB Railfreight	
66795	Bescot LDC	GB Railfreight	Named in October 2021 following the completion of an upgrade to the Bescot Local Distribution Centre.
66796	The Green Progressor	GB Railfreight	Named in September 2021.
66798	Justine	GB Railfreight	
66799	Modern Railways Diamond Jubilee		
66847	Terry Baker	Freightliner	
66849	Wylam Dilly	Freightliner	
66850	David Maidment OBE	Freightliner	
66957	Stephenson Locomotive Society 1909–2009	GB Railfreight	Named at Shildon, on 30 March 2009, as part of the Stephenson Locomotive Society's 100th anniversary celebrations.

== Models ==
In 2006, Hornby Railways launched its first version of the BR Class 66 in OO gauge range in a variety of liveries.

In 2008, Bachmann produced a OO gauge model of 66411 Eddie the Engine in DRS Stobart livery. In 2013, following on from Bachmann's OO gauge EWS and Freightliner liveried models of the Class 66, Bachmann introduced a DCC-ready version of 66846 in Colas Rail livery.

Since 2019, Hattons have offered a variety of paint schemes for their class 66 model in OO gauge.

Both Graham Farish and Dapol produce models of the Class 66 for British N gauge.

In 2008, Aristocraft introduced a G scale version of the Class 66 in GB Railfreight livery and in Freightliner livery.
