= Colas Rail =

British rail services company

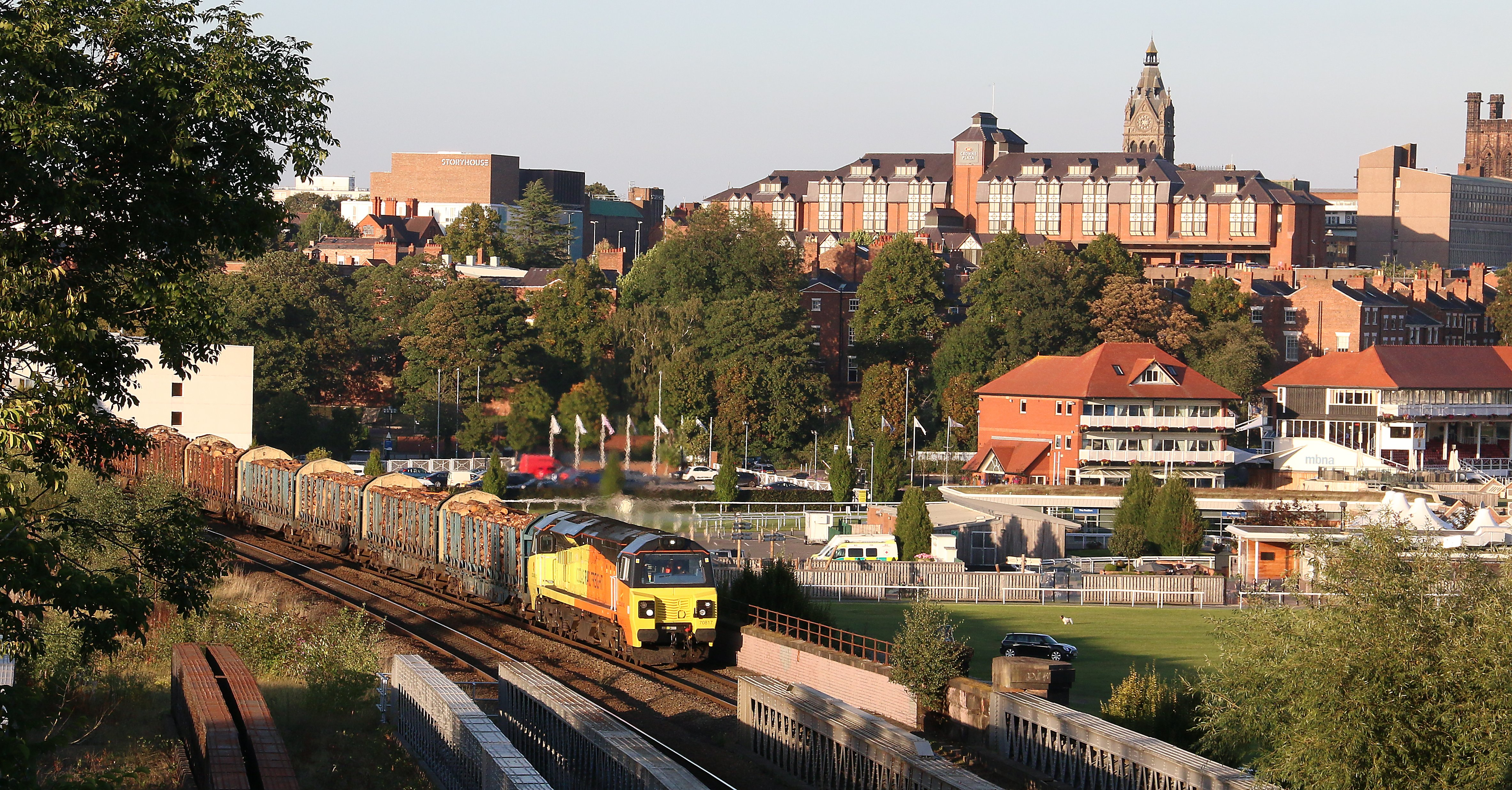
- Predecessor: Seco Rail; AMEC-Spie
- Founded: September 2007
- Headquarters: Courbevoie
- Area served: United Kingdom
- Services: Freight operating company Rail infrastructure renewal
- Parent: Bouygues
- Website: www.colasrail.com

Colas Rail is a railway infrastructure company, which also serves as a rail freight operator in the United Kingdom. It is a subsidiary of Bouygues.

Colas Rail was founded as Seco Rail by SECO (Société d'Études et de Construction d'Outillage). In the twentieth century, its main activities were railway construction and maintenance. Seco Rail was involved in various major projects, such as in the construction of phase one of High Speed 1. During 2006, it became a rail freight operator in the British market, initially transporting aggregates using leased rolling stock. Seco Rail acquired its first locomotives and regular freight customer, Kronospan, during the following year. In early 2008, Colas Group opted to reorganise its rail subsidiaries following recent acquisitions, merging Seco Rail with AMEC-Spie and Carillion's former plant division under the name Colas Rail.

During the late 2000s and early 2010s, Colas Rail continued to pick up more freight services, becoming involved in the haulage of coal and steel amongst other traffic. Further locomotives, such as Class 56s, Class 66s and Class 70s were acquired. By late 2016, Colas Rail was amongst the five largest contractors to Network Rail, and had 1,500 staff in the UK alone. During the 2010s, Colas Rail was engaged as the primary contractor for the Al Boraq high speed rail line in Morocco. Other projects included major improvement works at London Waterloo station and the West Midlands Metro, as well as the construction of the Contournement Nîmes – Montpellier high speed line in France.

== History ==
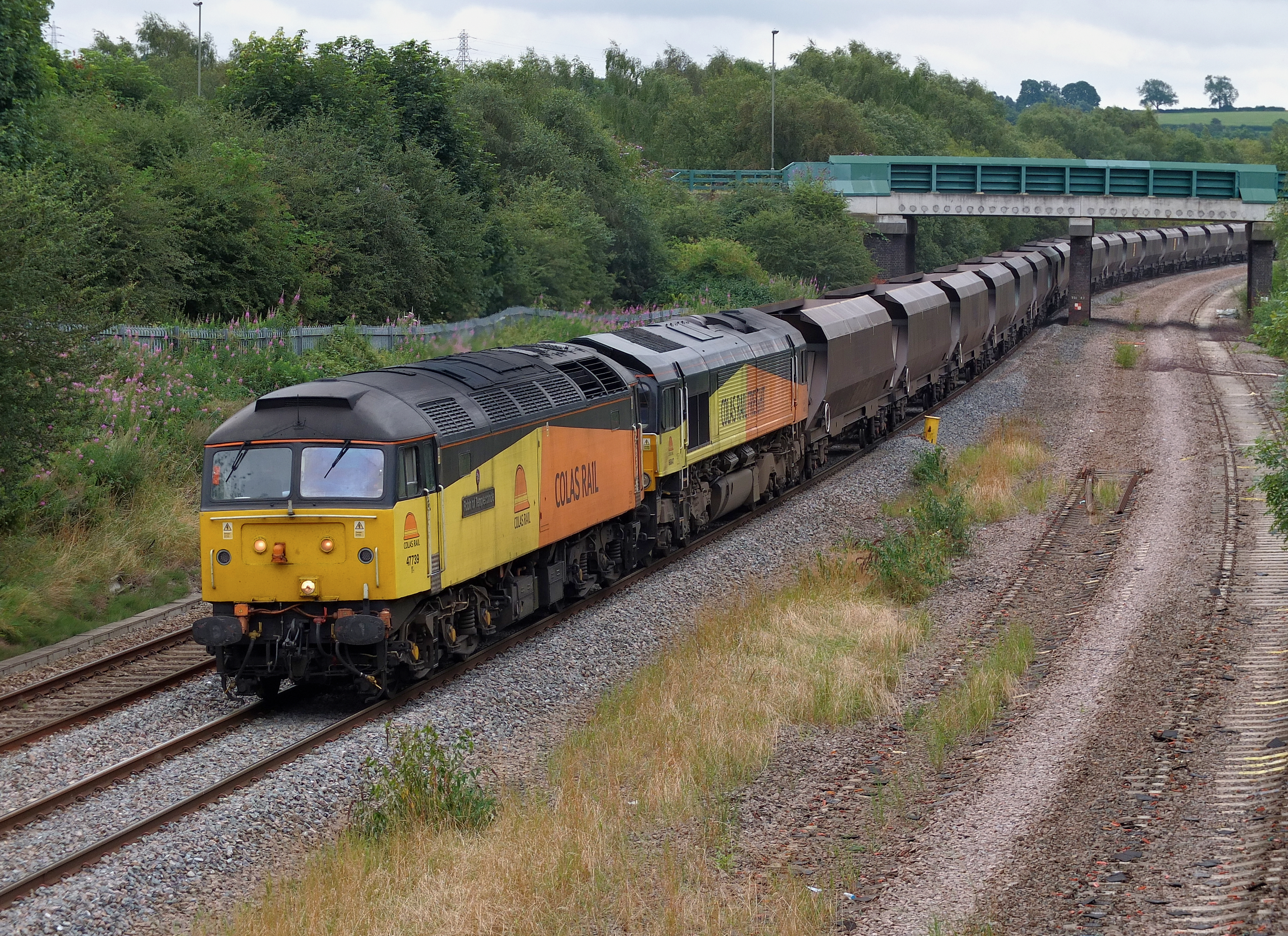
47739 and 66847 in August 2012

Colas Rail was founded as Seco Rail by French railway engineering company SECO (Société d'Études et de Construction d'Outillage). During the twentieth century, it was mostly concentrated on activities such as track maintenance, line construction, and urban transport services.

During 2000, SECO was acquired by the road construction company Colas Group. Whilst its activities has been historically centred around France, the company also operated subsidiaries in both the UK and Belgium. Amongst its achievements in the British market was its involvement in the construction of High Speed 1, having provided the detailed detail, supply, and installation of 46 miles of track, overhead electrification, and other systems during the first phase of the project.

During 2006, it became a train operator, initially focusing on the transportation of aggregates. In the following year, Colas became responsible for the Kronospan timber trains from Carlisle to Chirk, which was previously in the hands of AMEC-Spie and subsequently became Colas' first regular freight contract; it was operated using hired-in locomotives. Also during 2007, Colas purchased three Class 47 diesel locomotives from the freight operator England Wales Scotland (EWS); all three were overhauled at Eastleigh Works ahead of commencing operations in September 2007 on railhead treatment trains in South West England on behalf of the national rail infrastructure owner Network Rail.

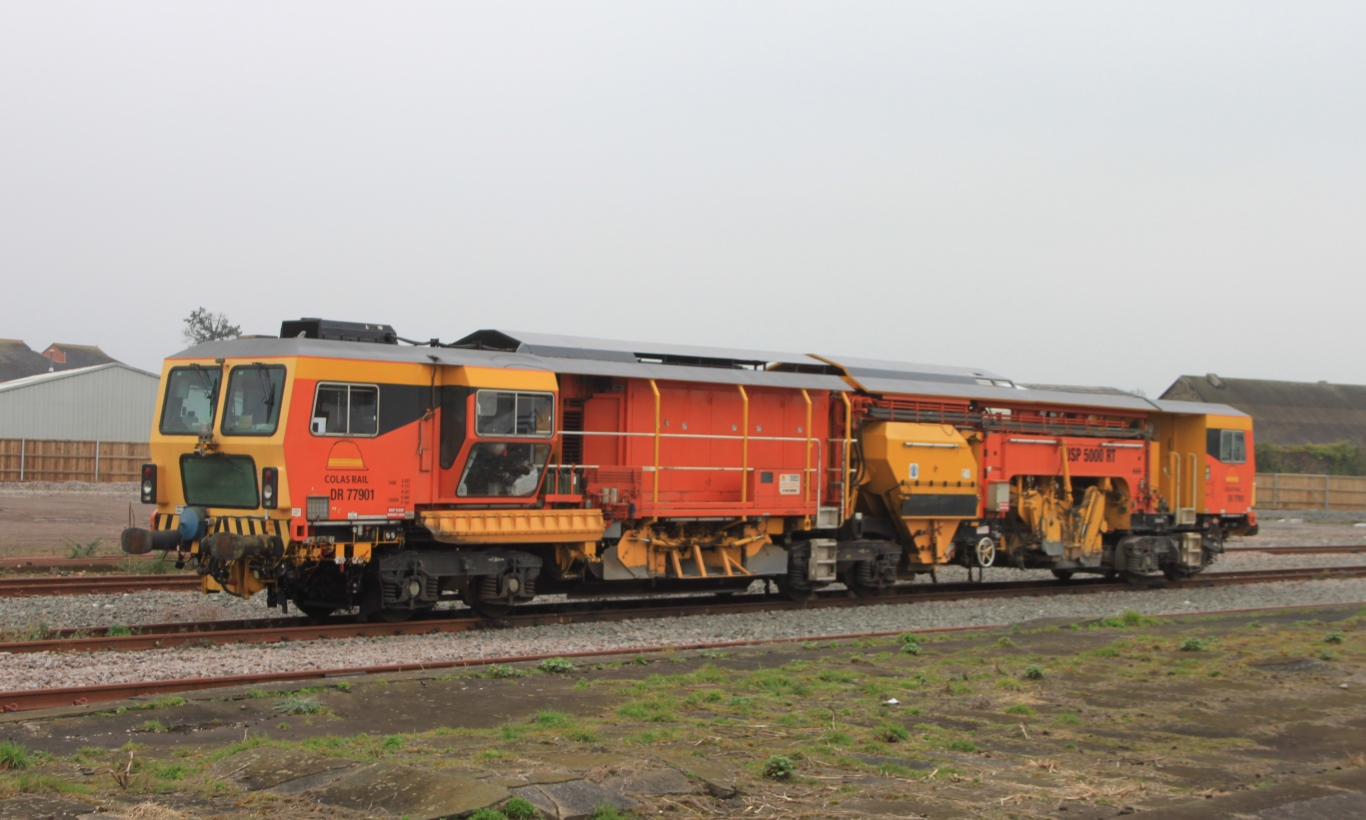
On-track plant: a ballast regulator

In January 2008, Colas Group also acquired the Plant division of Carillion Rail, comprising 12 tampers, three regulators, one locomotive, one 125T Kirow Crane, 16 switch-handling units (Pem/Lem), and the freehold of the Mill Lane Plant Depot in Rugby, making the company the owner of the largest fleet of modern on-track plant in the UK. Accordingly, the company decided to reorganise its rail operations, during which Seco Rail was merged with both Carillion Rail and another recently-purchased rail subsidiary, AMEC-Spie; the new entity operated under the Colas Rail brand.

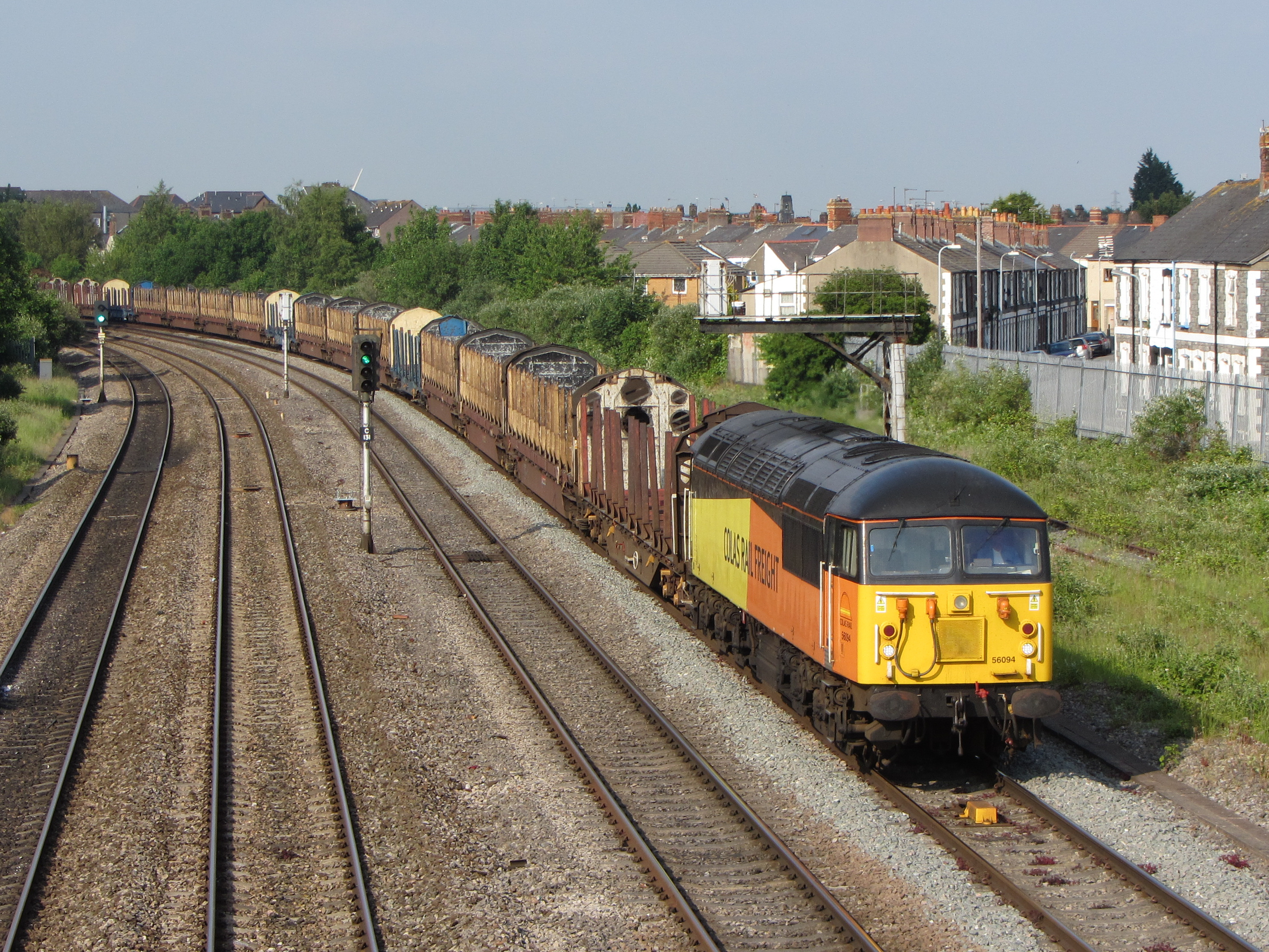
56 094 in June 2013

During late 2008, Colas Rail commenced operating steel trains from Immingham to Washwood Heath, hauled by Class 56 locomotives hired from Hanson Traction. In mid-2009, on behalf of a separate customer, it commenced a further steel flow from Burton upon Trent to Dollands Moor, which was hauling by the company's own Class 47s.

In late 2009, Colas leased four Class 66 (66 841–66 844) diesel locomotives that had last been used by the collapsed operator Advenza Freight. These were joined by 66 845 which had last been used by Direct Rail Services. As a consequence of their owners concluding a deal to lease all five locomotives to the British freight operator GB Railfreight, Colas purchased five replacement locomotives (66 846–66 850, formerly 66 573- 66 577) that had previously been operated by Freightliner. This rolling stock rearrangement coincided with Colas' entering of the UK coal haulage market during the summer of 2011.

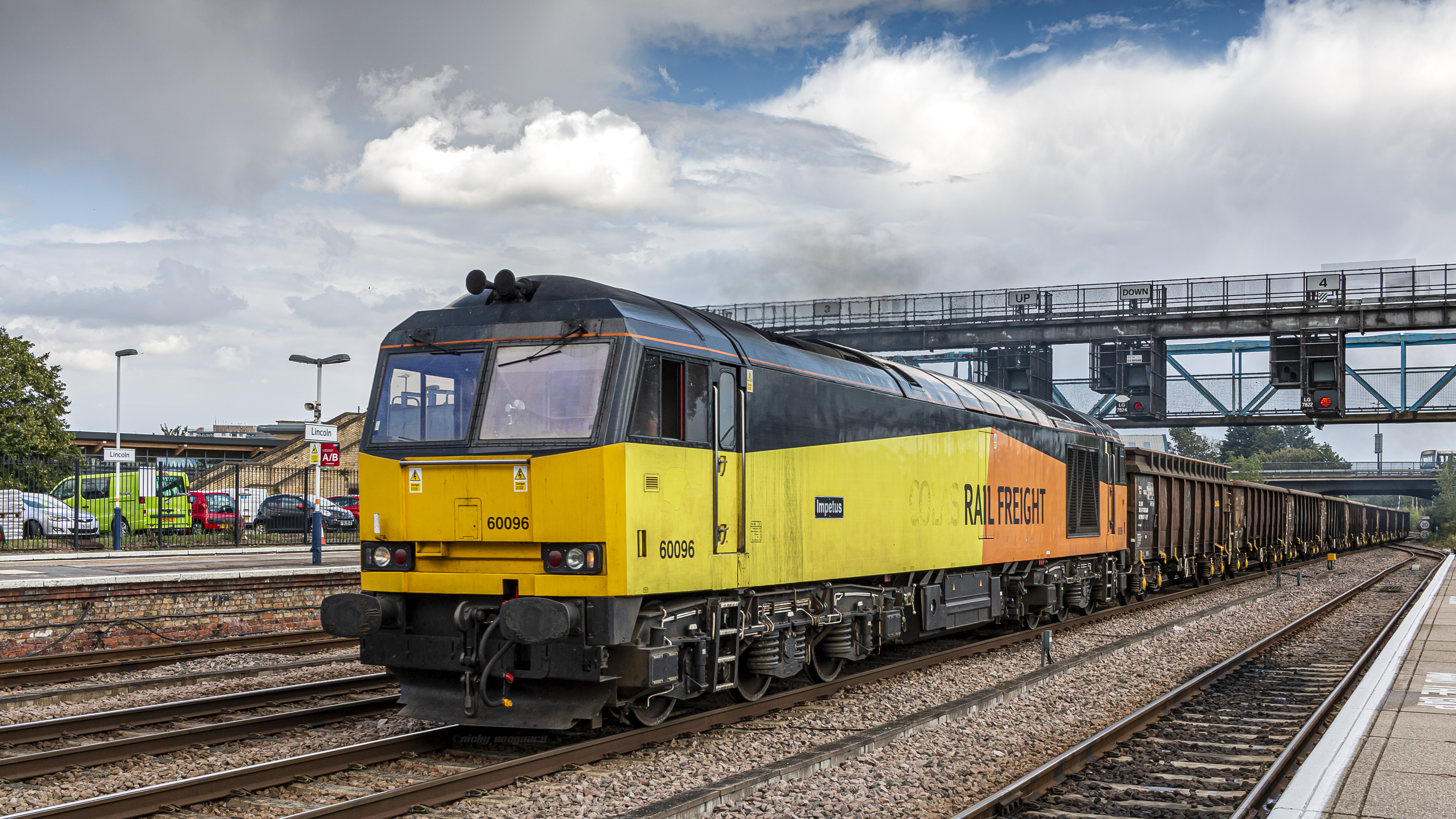
60 096 in August 2019

During December 2011, Colas launched a new service on behalf of Kronospan, moving timber from Gloucester to Newton Abbot, typically hauled by its Class 66 fleet. In late 2012, a single Class 86 electric locomotive (86 701) was briefly operated by the company on a trial service on the West Coast Main Line, hauling former First Great Western Motorail wagons; two years later, a similar trial service was conducted using a Class 60 locomotive instead.

During April 2012, Colas purchased four Class 56 locomotives. By January 2014, the company had a total of 11 members of the type in its inventory. During May 2012, it also purchased the Pullman Rail rolling stock maintenance business based in Cardiff.

In April 2013, Colas formed a joint venture with the British transport conglomerate Go-Ahead Group to bid for the concession to operate the Docklands Light Railway franchise, and was successfully short-listed during the competitive bidding process. However, during August 2013, it was announced that the bid had been withdrawn.

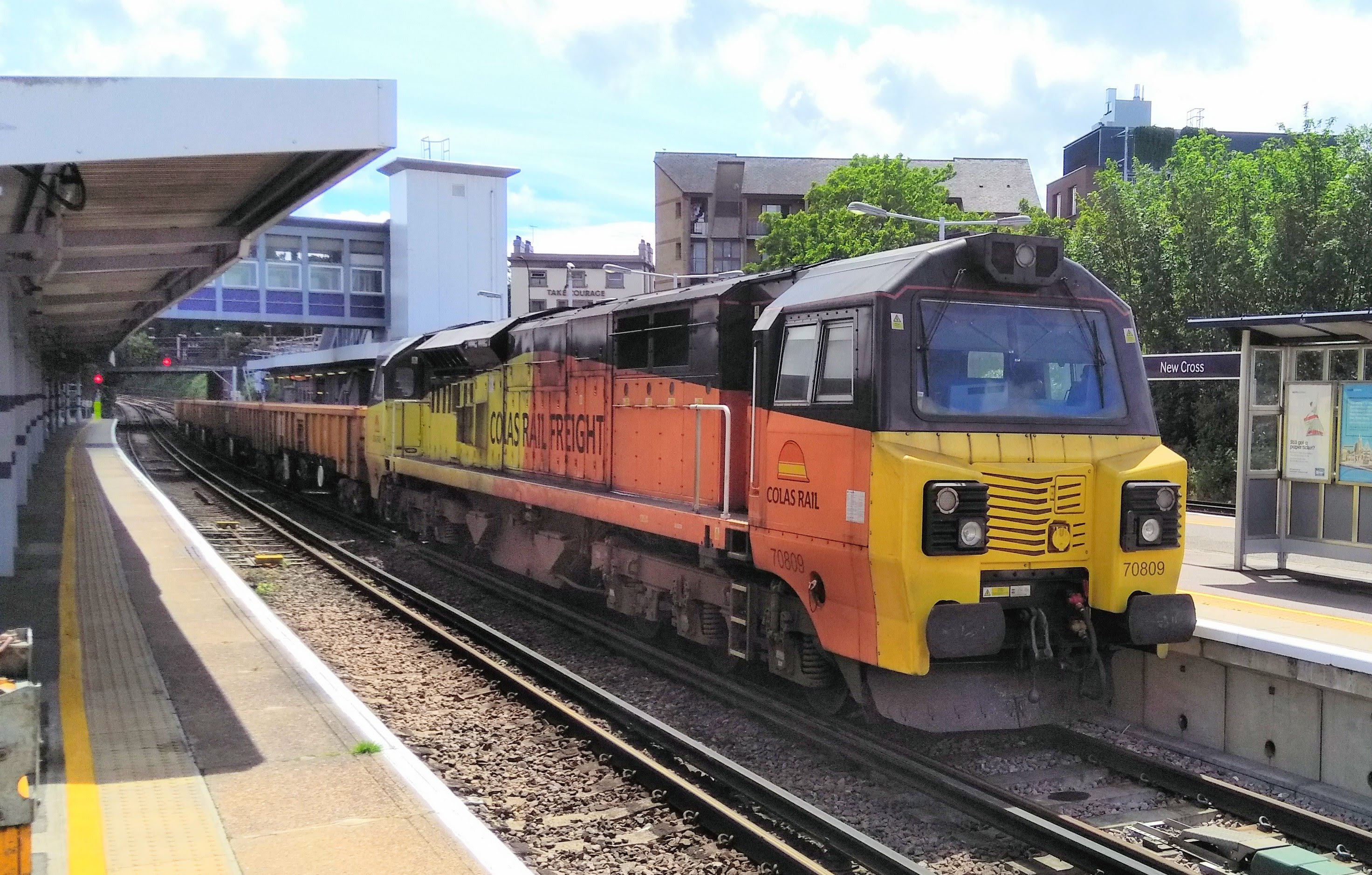
70 809 in June 2019

In November 2013, Colas placed an order for ten Class 70 diesel locomotives with the American railway manufacturer GE Transportation. Around the same time, it separately purchased four Class 37 locomotives formerly in preservation to return them to mainline operations.

During 2014, Colas Rail purchased ten Class 60 locomotives from DB Schenker, the deal included an option to purchase a further ten at a later date. In mid-2015, it made preparations to commence operating infrastructure trains on behalf of Network Rail; as a part of these preparations, a further four Class 37s were purchased by Colas to haul them. By late 2016, Colas Rail was amongst the five largest contractors to Network Rail, and had 1,500 staff in the UK alone.

In December 2017, Colas Rail sold its three Class 47 locomotives to GB Railfreight, as they had been deemed to be no longer useful to its core operations. During July 2018, it also sold all ten of its Class 60 locomotives to GB Railfreight.

During the 2010s, Colas Rail was active as the primary contractor for the Al Boraq Moroccan high speed rail line, being responsible for the delivery of the railway infrastructure. It was also one of several contractors that were engaged in major improvement works at London Waterloo station during the mid-to-late 2010s. The company has also been involved in delivering enhancements to the West Midlands Metro. Colas Rail was also one of the companies involved in delivering the Contournement Nîmes – Montpellier French high speed line. It has also stated its interest in, and has advocated for, the High Speed 2 project.

In 2018, Colas Rail publicly called for Network Rail to provide greater certainty on future rail freight paths, stating that investment in new services, such as rail-based parcel traffic, was being jeopardised by a lack of safeguards on capacity.

During August 2021, Colas announced the sale of its Pullman Rail engineering operation to the government-owned not-for-profit organisation Transport for Wales.

In February 2022, it conducted a trial service hauling timber from Devon to Monmouthshire on behalf of Euroforest Ltd.

== Fleet details ==
Colas Rail owns and operates a mixed fleet of on-track plant for maintenance operations. By 2016, this fleet was reportedly the largest of its type in the UK.

=== Current fleet ===
Class	Image	Type	Built	Fleet Size
09-16 CSM Tamper / Liner		Tamping Machine	1988	1
08-16(32)U RT Plain Line Tamper		Tamping Machine	2002	1
08-4x4/4S-RT Switch & Crossing Tamper		Tamping Machine	1998-2010	14
08-12/4x4C-RT Switch & Crossing Tamper		Tamping Machine	2000	1
08-16/4x4C100-RT Tamper		Tamping Machine	2001-2002	6
B41UE Tamper		Tamping Machine	2005-2006	2
USP5000C Ballast Regulator		Ballast Regulator	1983	1
USP5000RT Ballast Regulator		Ballast Regulator	2003	1
Unimat 09-4x4/4S Dynamic Tamper		Tamping Machine	2018-2020	4
Self-Propelled Heavy Duty Twin Jib Crane		Railway Crane	1980	2
KRC1200UK Heavy Duty Diesel Hydraulic Crane		Railway Crane	2005	1
			Total	34

Class	Image	Type	Introduced	Fleet Size	Wheel Arr
37	37421	Diesel locomotive	1960-1965	8	Co-Co
43		Diesel locomotive	1975-1982	10	Bo-Bo
56	56302	Diesel locomotive	1976-1984	10	Co-Co
66	66849	Diesel locomotive	1998-2015	5	Co-Co
67		Diesel locomotive	1999-2000	2	Bo-Bo
70	70803	Diesel locomotive	2014; 2016-7	17	Co-Co
			Total	52	

=== Past fleet ===
Class	Image	Type	Introduced	Number	Wheel Arr	Numbers	Sold to
37		Diesel locomotive	1960-1965	1	Co-Co	37521	Locomotive Services Limited
43		Diesel locomotive	1975-1982	3	Bo-Bo	43045, 43050, 43060	
47	47749	Diesel locomotive	1962-1967	3	Co-Co	47727, 47739, 47749	GB Railfreight
60		Diesel locomotive	1989	10	Co-Co	60002, 60021, 60026, 60047, 60056, 60076, 60085, 60087, 60095–60096	GB Railfreight
66		Diesel-electric locomotive	1998-2015	5	Co-Co	66841–66845	GB Railfreight
86	86701	Electric locomotive	1965-6	1	Bo-Bo	86701	Exported to Bulgaria.
