= Heavy Haul Rail =

Rail freight transport company

- Industry: Freight transport
- Predecessor: Freightliner Heavy Haul
- Founded: 29 January 2026; 7 months ago
- Headquarters: Birmingham, England
- Key people: Tim Shoveller (Chairman); Dave Penney (CEO)
- Parent: Brookfield; GIC
- Website: www.heavyhaulrail.co.uk

Heavy Haul Rail is a British rail freight transport company that was spun off from Freightliner in January 2026. It is owned by Brookfield and GIC.

== History ==
Freightliner was founded in 1969 pursuant to the Transport Act 1968 to focus on the movement of intermodal containers by rail. It was owned by the British Rail Board and National Freight Corporation. In 1977 full ownership was vested in the British Rail Board.

In May 1996 as part of the privatisation of British Rail, Freightliner was sold in a management buyout. In December 1999, Freightliner diversified into the heavy haulage market to compete with EWS.

Freightliner announced in September 2025 that it had agreed to terms to sell its UK intermodal container business to CMA CGM. The sale was completed on 29 January 2026. As the sale included use of the Freightliner brand, the residual business was rebranded 'Heavy Haul Rail'.

== Operations ==
At the time of separation from the Freightliner operation in January, Heavy Haul Rail was running around 250 trains each week and serving around 100 locations. It operated ten depots and yards:

- Barrow Hill
- Basford Hall, Crewe
- Doncaster (jointly with Freightliner)
- Earles Sidings, Derbyshire
- Fairwater, Taunton
- Guide Bridge Vehicle Maintenance Facility, Manchester
- Hunslet, Leeds
- Midland Road, Leeds
- Stoke Gifford, near Bristol
- York Yard South

== Fleet ==
Heavy Haul Rail commenced operations with 95 locomotives; 14 class 59s, 62 class 66s and 19 class 70s.

Class	Image	Type	Built	Wheel arr.	In traffic	Numbers	Notes
59		Diesel locomotive	1985-1995	Co-Co	4	59001, 59002, 59004, 59005	Acquired from Mendip Rail in 2019.
59		Diesel locomotive	1985-1995	Co-Co	4	59101 59102, 59103, 59104	Acquired from Mendip Rail in 2019.
59		Diesel locomotive	1985-1995	Co-Co	6	59201, 59202, 59203, 59204, 59205, 59206	Acquired from DB Cargo UK in 2019.
66		Diesel locomotive	1999-2008	Co-Co	7	66413, 66414, 66415, 66416, 66418, 66419, 66420	Acquired from Direct Rail Services in 2011.
66		Diesel locomotive	1999-2008	Co-Co	29	66507, 66520, 66522, 66534, 66536, 66537, 66545, 66546, 66547, 66548, 66550, 66555, 66556, 66557, 66558, 66559, 66560, 66561, 66562, 66563, 66564, 66565, 66566, 66585, 66587, 66588, 66589, 66590, 66594	
66		Diesel locomotive	1999-2008	Co-Co	19	66601, 66602, 66603, 66604, 66605, 66606, 66607, 66610, 66613, 66614, 66615, 66616, 66617, 66618, 66619, 66620, 66621, 66622, 66623	
66		Diesel locomotive	1999-2008	Co-Co	4	66951, 66952 66953, 66957	
70		Diesel locomotive	2009-2011	Co-Co	19	70001, 70002, 70003, 70004, 70005, 70006, 70007, 70008, 70009, 70010, 70011, 70013, 70014, 70015, 70016, 70017, 70018, 70019, 70020	70012 dropped while being unloaded at Newport; returned to manufacturers and is used as a test bed.
