= British Rail Class 70 =

Class of diesel electric locomotives

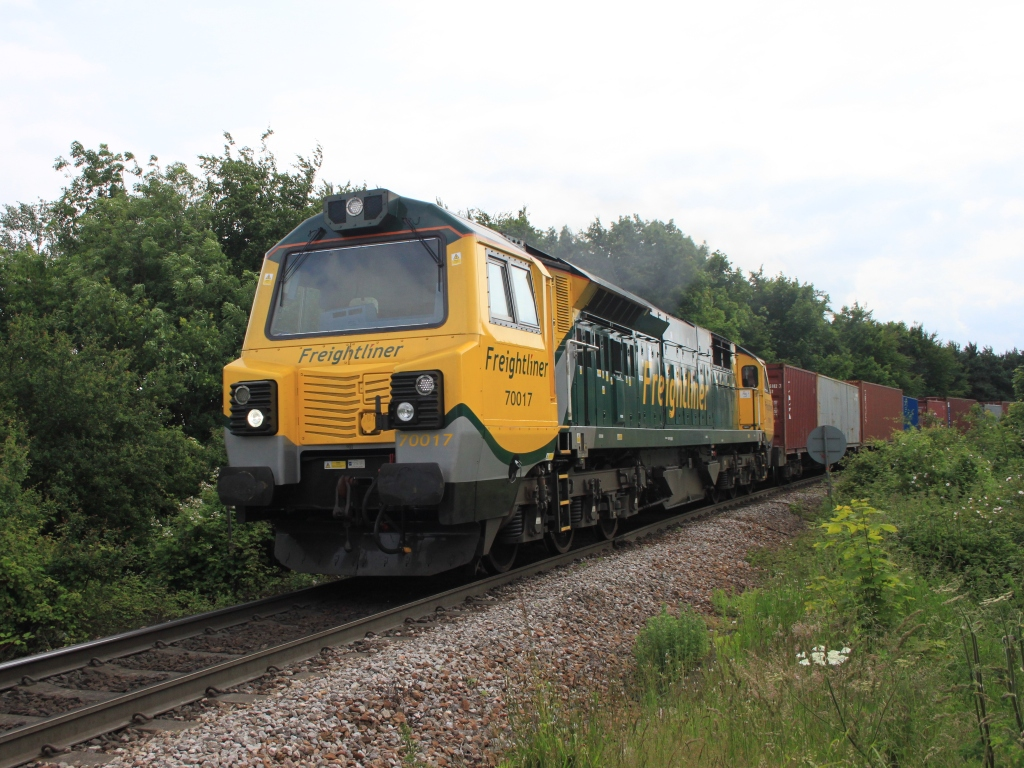
- A Freightliner Class 70 in 2012
Type and origin
- Power type: Diesel-electric
- Builder: General Electric
- Model: PH37ACmi
- Build date: 2008–2017
- Total produced: 37
Specifications
- Configuration
  - UIC: Co′Co′
  - Commonwealth: Co-Co
- Gauge: 4 ft 8 1/2 in (1,435 mm) standard gauge
- Wheel diameter: 1,067 mm (42.0 in)
- Length: 21.710 m (71 ft 2.7 in)
- Width: 2.642 m (8 ft 8 in)
- Height: 3.917 m (12 ft 10.2 in)
- Loco weight: 129 t (127 long tons; 142 short tons)
- Fuel capacity: 6,000 L (1,300 imp gal; 1,600 US gal)
- Prime mover: GE PowerHaul P616
- Alternator: GE GTA series
- Traction motors: GE 5GEB30 axle hung
- MU working: AAR system (59, 66, 67, 68 008-015, 69, 70, and 73/9)
- Train heating: None
Performance figures
- Maximum speed: 75 mph (121 km/h)
- Power output: Engine: 2,750 kW (3,690 bhp)
- Tractive effort: 534 kN (120,000 lbf) (starting)
Career
- Operators: Heavy Haul Rail; Colas Rail
- Numbers: 70001-70020; 70801-70817

The British Rail Class 70 is a Co-Co mainline freight GE PowerHaul locomotive series manufactured by General Electric in Erie, Pennsylvania, United States. They are operated in the United Kingdom by Freightliner and Colas Rail. These locomotives replaced the Class 59 as having the highest tractive effort of any Co-Co Diesel locomotive in use in the United Kingdom when they were introduced.

== Background and specification ==
In November 2007, Freightliner announced Project Genesis, a procurement plan for 30 freight locomotives from General Electric (GE). The locomotives ordered were intended to match older types in terms of haulage capacity whilst at the same time being more fuel-efficient. The project was a collaborative effort between Freightliner and GE, with input from drivers on the cab design. The locomotives utilize a GE PowerHaul P616 diesel engine rated at 2,750 kW (3,690 hp). The locomotive meets EU Tier IIIa emission regulations. Freightliner expects that the locomotive's efficiency is 7% higher than contemporary models, with a further 3% increase in efficiency whilst braking; regenerative braking is used to supply the energy to power auxiliary motors.

The locomotives were given the Class 70 TOPS code.

The new locomotives are similar in appearance to a Class 58; a hood unit design with a narrow body typical of locomotive types in use in North America, the cabs are accessed from the rear via exterior walkways on the narrow part of the hood. The distinctive front end shape is due to crashworthiness features (Note: The relevant standard at the time of introduction being EN 15227) It is also fitted with air conditioning and acoustic insulation to improve the crew's environment, making it an improvement over the Class 66.

== Operations ==
=== Freightliner ===
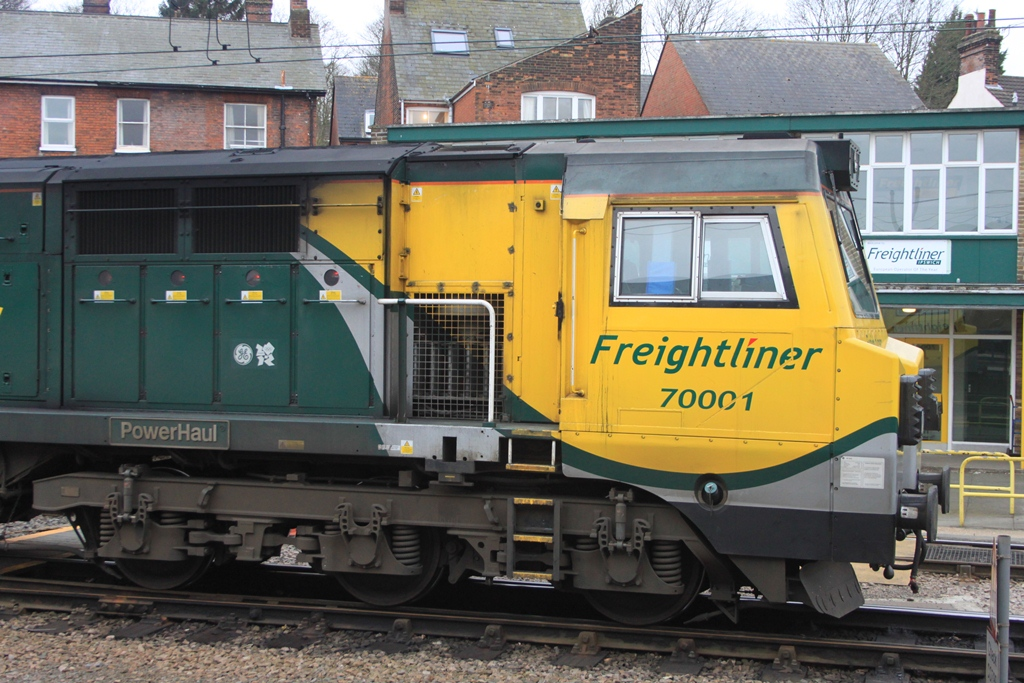
Freightliner 70001 Powerhaul

Construction of the first two locomotives at GE's Erie, Pennsylvania plant was completed in July 2009, with both locomotives tested during the same month. The original plan was for two months of testing, with the locomotives then spending a further three weeks being modified where necessary and prepared for transport to the United Kingdom.

The first two locomotives arrived at Newport Docks on 8 November 2009. The delivery gave GE its first locomotives in service on the British rail network. The first locomotive was given the name PowerHaul' at Leeds on 24 November 2009.

Four more locomotives were delivered to the UK on 2 December 2009. On operation tests, 70001 hauled a 30-wagon train consisting of 60 ISO containers during December 2009. 70002 also hauled a 19 hopper 1,300-tonne (1,400-ton) coal train in the same month.

On 5 January 2011, 70012 was severely damaged while being unloaded at Newport Dock when part of the lifting gear failed, causing the locomotive to fall back into the hold of the ship. It was shipped back to the GE plant in Erie for repairs, where it now resides for use as a test bed for the Class 70 fleet.

In January 2017, some were placed in store at Freightliner's Leeds Midland Road depot. By July 2018, 13 of the 19 were in store. In March 2020, only four remained in store, the rest having been returned to service. However, by June 2020 all Freightliner examples were in storage at Leeds Midlands Road, with only two, 016 and 017, returning to service as of July 2020.

After Freighliner sold its intermodal container business to CMA CGM in January 2026, all 19 moved to Heavy Haul Rail.

=== Turkish demonstrator ===
In August 2012, it was announced that the demonstrator locomotive built in Turkey in 2011 was to be transferred to the UK and allocated the number 70099. The locomotive was to be allocated to the private owners pool for use as required. On 19 November 2012, it was announced that 70099 was to test trial with GB Railfreight for coal and intermodal traffic trials.

=== Colas Rail ===
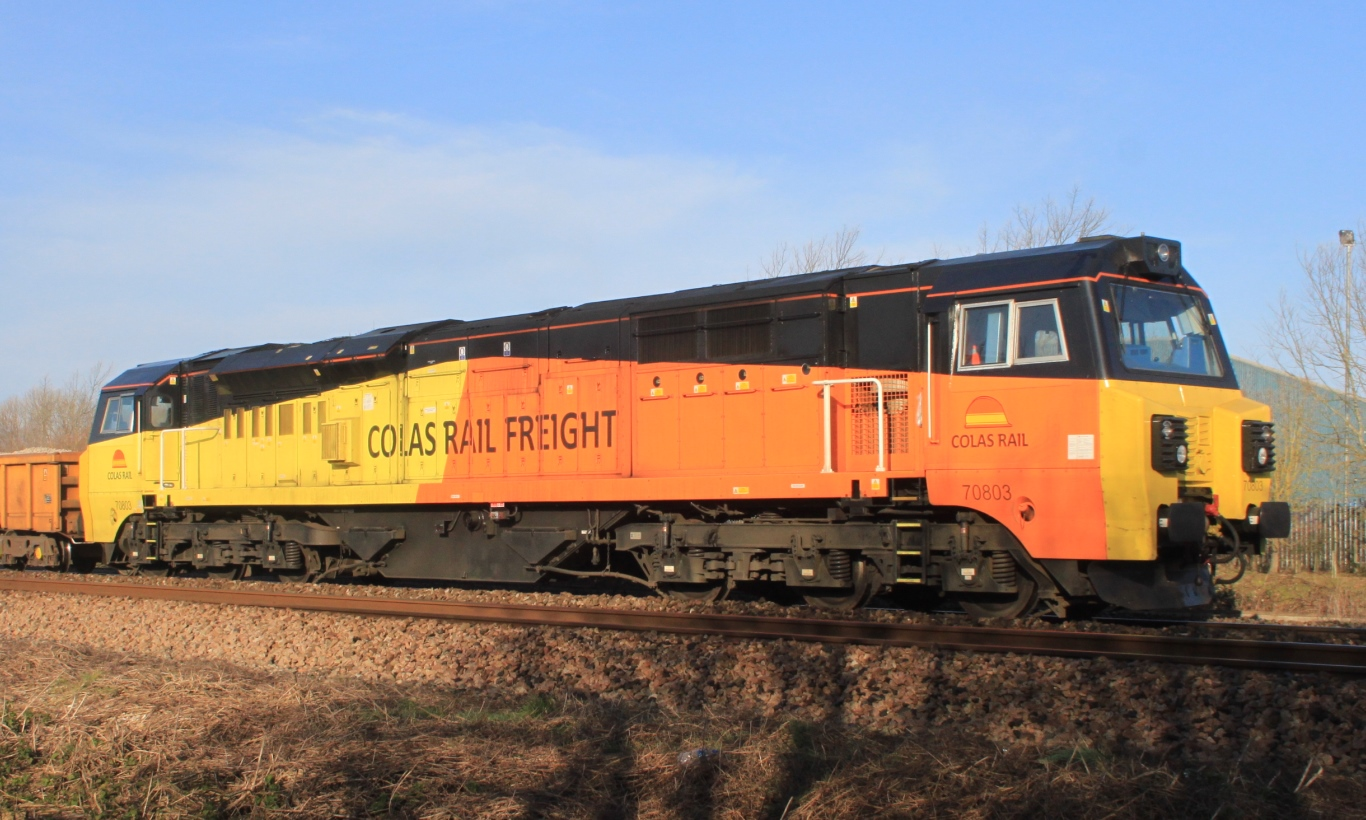
Colas Rail 70803

In November 2013, Colas Rail announced it had ordered ten class 70s for entry into service in 2014; the order included the Turkish built demonstrator 70099, renumbered as 70801, and the remainder of Freightliner's original order option of 30 locomotives.

Colas' locomotives were allotted numbers in the 708xx range. Locomotives 70802–70805 had already been constructed at the time of the order and were shipped to the United Kingdom in January 2014, with the rest assembled and delivered later the same year. In 2015, Colas announced the purchase of an additional seven locomotives, which were delivered by 2017.

== Accidents and incidents ==
- On 5 January 2011, locomotive 70012 was dropped during unloading from the ship in which it had travelled from the United States. Part of the lifting gear failed, causing the locomotive to fall approximately 13 to 20 ft (4 to 6 m) from the crane, back into the hold of the ship. The impact severely bent the locomotive's frame, rendering it unserviceable and resulting in it later being returned to the United States. It was rebuilt as a test bed and used as a shunter at the Erie plant.
- On 5 April 2012, locomotive 70018 had an engine room fire requiring the attention of the fire brigade, whilst hauling a freight train on the line between Basingstoke and Winchester, Hampshire.
- On 27 February 2016, locomotive 70803 collided with an engineers train at Ivybridge, Devon and was derailed.
- On 30 October 2016, locomotive 70804 ran away and was derailed at Toton Sidings in Nottinghamshire.
- On 28 January 2020, a container train hauled by 70001 was derailed at Eastleigh, Hampshire. The derailment was caused by a defect which allowed the track to spread underneath the train.

== See also ==
- GE CM20EMP, Indonesian twin-cab GE locomotive
