= Freightliner Group =

Rail freight and logistics company

Freightliner Group Limited

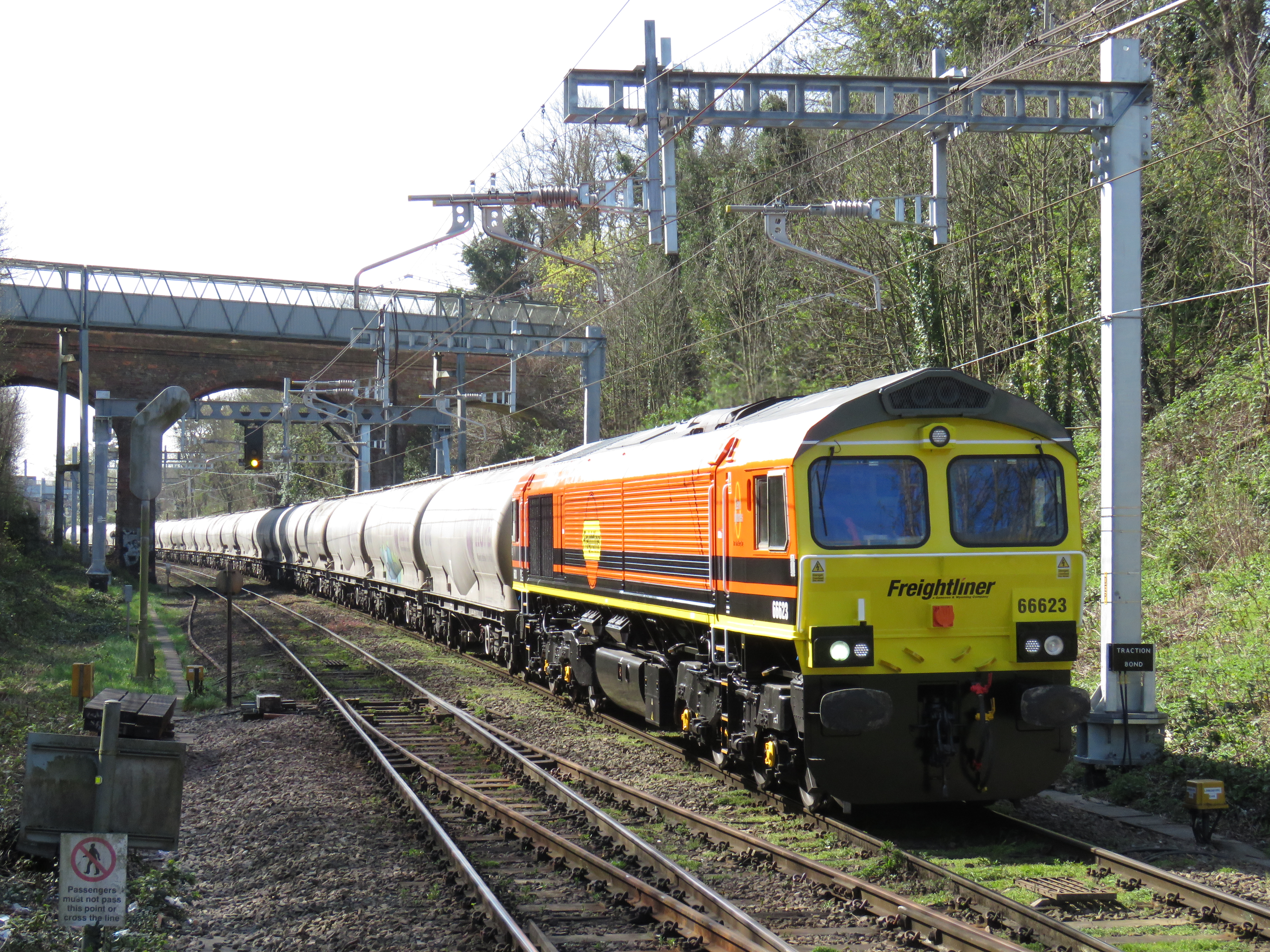
- Type: Subsidiary
- Industry: Rail freight transport
- Predecessor: British Rail
- Founded: 1995; 31 years ago
- Headquarters: Birmingham, England
- Area served: United Kingdom; Germany; Poland; Netherlands
- Services: Bulk freight
- Revenue: US$785 million
- Number of employees: 2,500+
- Parent: CMA CGM
- Divisions: Intermodal, Heavy Haul, Maintenance
- Subsidiaries: Rotterdam Rail Feeding; Pentalver
- Website: www.freightliner.co.uk

Freightliner Group is a rail freight and logistics company headquartered in the United Kingdom. It is owned by Brookfield, a Canadian investment management company and GIC, a Singaporean sovereign wealth fund.

It was originally created after the Transport Act 1968 as Freightliner Limited, a British government-owned company. From its onset, Freightliner was focused on the haulage of international traffic, thus came to centre its activities around Britain's sea ports, often building new multimodal freight depots adjacent to such locations to better capture this business. During the late 1970s, it was reorganised under British Rail, and became a part of its Railfreight Distribution subsidiary during the late 1980s. Work to expand the loading gauge on routes such as the East Coast Main Line, allowing trains hauling larger containers to use those routes, was conducted around this time. Numerous domestic depots previously operated by Freightliner were closed during the 1990s in preparation for the privatisation of British Rail that same decade.

As a consequence of the privatisation initiative, the business unit was reorganised as Freightliner Limited; on 25 May 1996, it was privatised and sold in a management buyout, supported by 3i and Electra Private Equity for £5.4 million. Freightliner quickly set about modernising and expanding its locomotive fleet, ordering Class 57 and Class 66 locomotives. During 1999, it established the Heavy Haul business; five years later, the Logico service was also launched. By 2014, Freightliner Limited had become the largest intermodal freight transport operator in the United Kingdom, as well as the second largest freight operating company in the country by revenue, behind DB Cargo UK. It had also expanded its operations into various other countries, including Australia, the Netherlands and Poland.

In 2008, Freightliner Group was purchased by Railinvest Holding Company, a subsidiary of Arcapita Bank of Bahrain. In 2015, Freightliner was acquired by Genesee & Wyoming. In 2024, it was split from Genesee & Wyoming by its parent companies Brookfield and GIC. In 2025, the UK intermodal business was sold along with the 'Freightliner' brand in the UK to CMA CGM. The UK bulk haulage business was retained by Brookfield Infrastructure Partners and GIC and renamed Heavy Haul Rail.

== History ==
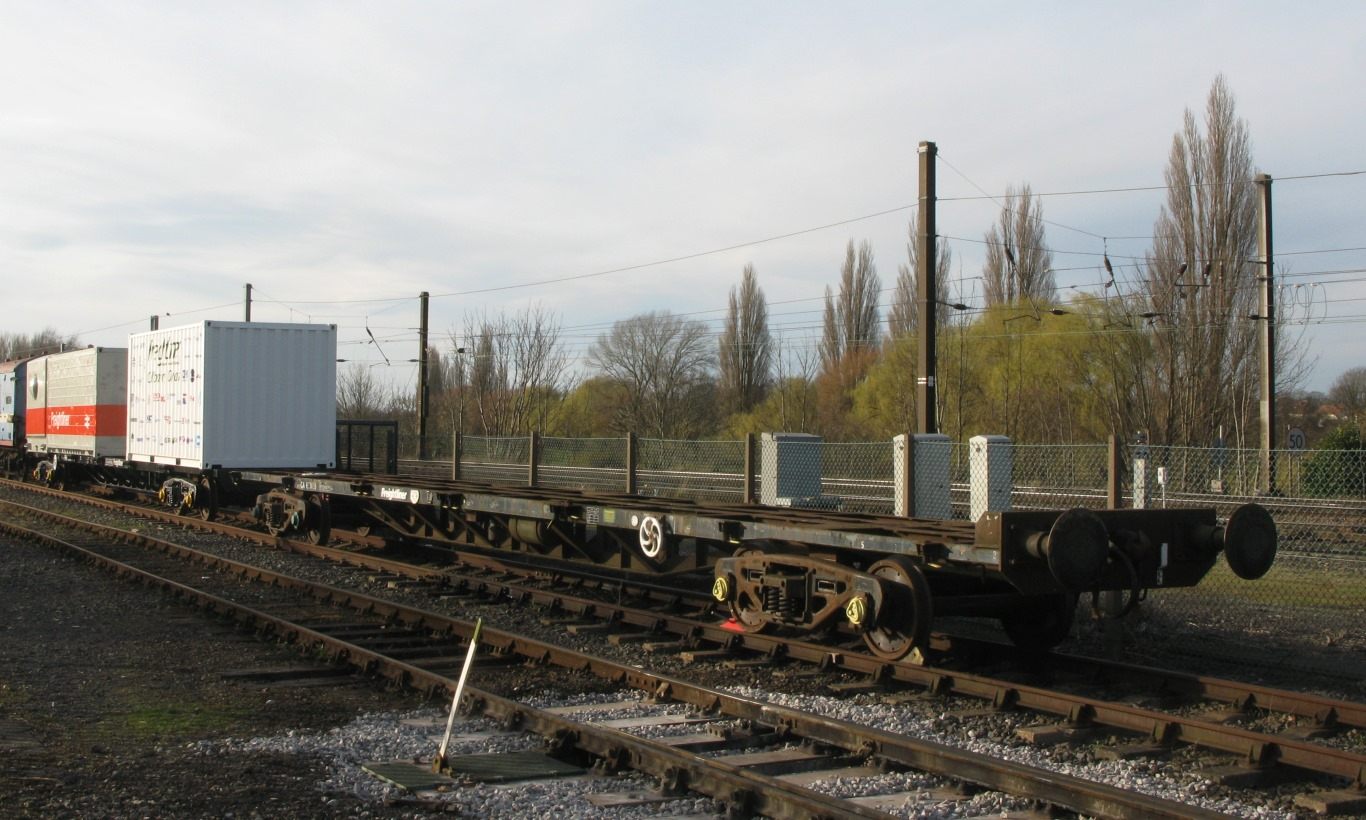
Original BR FGA Freightliner flats 60152-601403, preserved outside the National Railway Museum, York

=== British Rail ===
The idea of shipping freight in set-sized containers went back to the 1930s in the UK with the adoption of the Conflat system. But it was Dr Richard Beeching who, in his report Reshaping Britain's Railways, advanced the concept of containerised freight in the UK.

Beeching proposed 55 depots placed strategically across the UK, serviced by fixed-consist permanently coupled air-braked trains, with an average journey between depots of 150 miles (240 km) and a shortest distance of 50 miles (80 km). British Rail progressed with the concept, envisaging 40-foot (12 m) length wagons – later increased to 60 ft (18 m) – carrying 8 ft × 8 ft × 8 ft (2.4 m × 2.4 m × 2.4 m) standard sized international shipping containers in lengths of 10 to 27 ft (3.0 to 8.2 m), later adapted to 20 to 40 ft (6.1 to 12.2 m). These BR UK-adopted standards were formed on the basis of analysis of then current international intermodal practise, and later adopted as the base of the internationally agreed ISO 668. Containers would be loaded at the dedicated inland terminals, using gantry cranes for transshipment between road and rail.

During January 1964, the prototype flat wagon was produced by Shildon railway works; later that same year, 100 production wagons were turned out from Ashford railway works. The first revenue-earning train ran between York Way/Maiden Lane in North London and Gushetfaulds in Glasgow on 15 November 1965. Soon adopting the Freightliner name, the first single-shipper train was operated on 20 August 1968, hauling specially designed 30-foot (9.1 m) containers carrying parts for Ford Escort cars that were destined for assembly in plants on the European mainland.

=== Freightliner Ltd (1968) ===
Beeching's original concept envisioned Freightliner servicing a domestic freight market, which by 1968 had resulted in British Railways developing 17 purpose-built depots. However, Freightliner's most profitable routes were those servicing Britain's major ports, specifically traffic to/from continental Europe and Ireland, as well as import/export traffic to the rest of the world. This pattern of profitability was recognised in the Transport Act 1968, whereby Freightliner became a separate listed commercial company wholly owned by the UK Government, but which leased its UK domestic rail transport from British Railways.

By the end of the 1960s, Freightliner operated 28 terminals and 56 routes, however, the company's shift in focus from the original domestic freight market to the international market serviced via ports continued for the next 30 years, with many of the original domestic depots which did not service port traffic either never opening or eventually closing (i.e.: Kings Cross, Sheffield, Swansea, Swindon), whilst investment in seaport depots – specifically Southampton, Harwich, and the Port of Felixstowe where Beeching's plan had never envisaged a depot – continued at an increasing pace. Part of the consolidation of rail depots was enabled by a greater focus on Freightliner's own HGV network of dedicated lorries, which expanded the servicing footprint of each rail depot, and hence allowed increased efficiency through creating longer and better utilised train routes.

Dudley Freightliner Terminal, 10 miles (16 km) from Birmingham, on the site of the old railway station was opened in October 1967. This initially proved to be one of the most profitable such terminals in the country, while the Birmingham terminal was ultimately one of the least financially viable. In 1981, due to a lack of international traffic, Freightliner was planning to close Dudley and transfer its function to Birmingham. Given a reprieve in 1983, it finally closed during 1986.

Increasing Irish traffic resulted in a depot being opened at the Port of Holyhead, as well as Freightliner having dedicated operations in both Belfast and Dublin. This also resulted in UK Government granting Freightliner funds to create a dedicated multimodal terminal at the Port of Liverpool to replace its previously lost rail freight traffic, and then further investment in second multimodal terminals at both Felixstowe and the Port of Tilbury.

=== Return to British Railways ===
The Transport Act 1978 brought Freightliner back inside the control of British Railways, mostly driven by the investment required to ease the rail network's loading gauge restrictions that hampered the transport of shipping containers 8 ft 6 in (2.59 m) and 9 ft (2.7 m) in height.

Freightliner immediately made a major pitch to the BR Board to allow 8 ft 6 in (2.59 m) containers to be carried on the East Coast Main Line (ECML), which involved lowering the track in Stoke area, as well as in Peascliffe and Penmanshiel tunnels (in Lincolnshire and the Scottish Borders, respectively). The alterations were successfully completed at Stoke and Peascliffe, but Penmanshiel Tunnel collapsed in March 1979 while work was underway, killing two workers and severing the ECML between Edinburgh and Berwick. The extent of the collapse meant that reconstruction was considered to be too dangerous and expensive, so the tunnel was bypassed by a new section of line constructed in an open cutting slightly to the west of the original alignment that opened five months later in late August. Freightliner later withdraw its services on that stretch of the ECML.

During the 1980s, Freightliner became part of BR's 1980s non-bulk Railfreight Distribution (RfD) division, which brought about its first ever allocation of locomotives. After experimenting with other rail operators solutions to coping with the new larger containers, in 1990 BR agreed the order of 700 flat-wagons from SNCF supplier Arbel Fauvet Rail, which could immediately accommodate 8 ft 6inch height containers at 75 mph speeds. This was further supplemented in 1991 with leased flat-wagons from Tiphook. Further experimentation with SNCF-leased Multifret flat-wagons – which could accommodate 9 ft containers at speeds of up to 90 mph (140 km/h) – led to an order of 45 BR-specified "Lowliner" wagons with a deck height of only 720 mm (2 ft 4 in), which allowed the transport of 9-foot-high containers on routes approved for 8 ft 6 in containers using the existing wagon fleet.

Although designed to accommodate 9 ft containers over the entire BR network, the slow delivery of Lowliners meant that the entire allocation was utilised instead to carry 8 ft 6 in containers on trains to and from London Thamesport, circumventing the restricted clearances on the former South Eastern & Chatham Railway. The withdrawal of Sealink's dedicated freight service from Holyhead also brought about the end of Freightliner's dedicated service to Northern Ireland via North Wales.

=== Privatisation - Freightliner (1995) Ltd ===
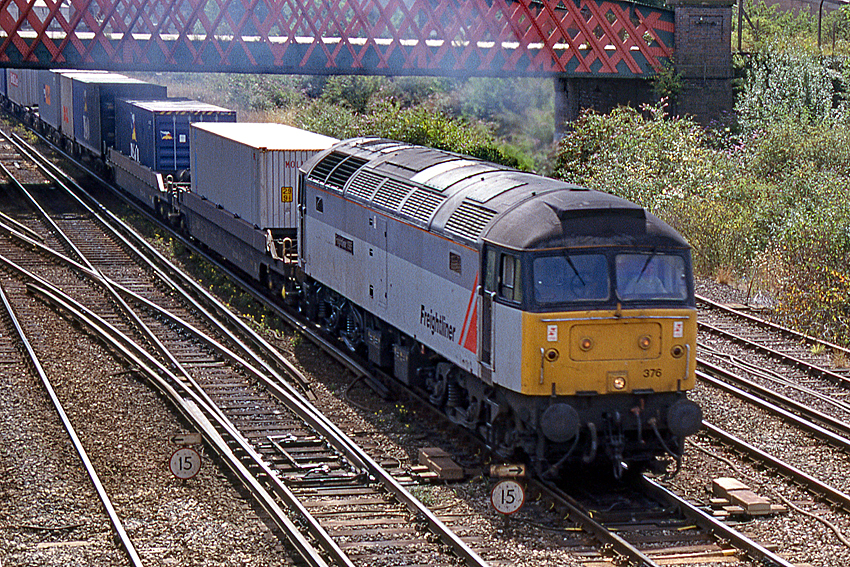
47376 in original Freightliner livery. This locomotive was used to launch the company in 1995, being named Freightliner 1995.

As part of the Privatisation of British Rail, the loss-making RfD division came under increasing pressure, leading to the immediate closure of the Speedlink division. Freightliner closed the residual domestic-serving depots, including London's Willesden and Stratford, Bristol (closed in 1992, later reopened in 2014) Glasgow Gushetfaulds, and consolidation of Manchester's traffic on the newly opened Euroterminal (later switched back to the previously closed Trafford Park).

The Freightliner business unit had its assets transferred into a new company, Freightliner (1995) Limited, in preparation for sale. Rejected as not sufficiently profitable by English Welsh & Scottish Railway, on 25 May 1996, Freightliner was purchased in a management buyout backed by 3i and Electra Private Equity for a sum of £5.4 million. As part of the sale agreement, the UK Government awarded the company a track-access grant of £75 million up until the year 2000.

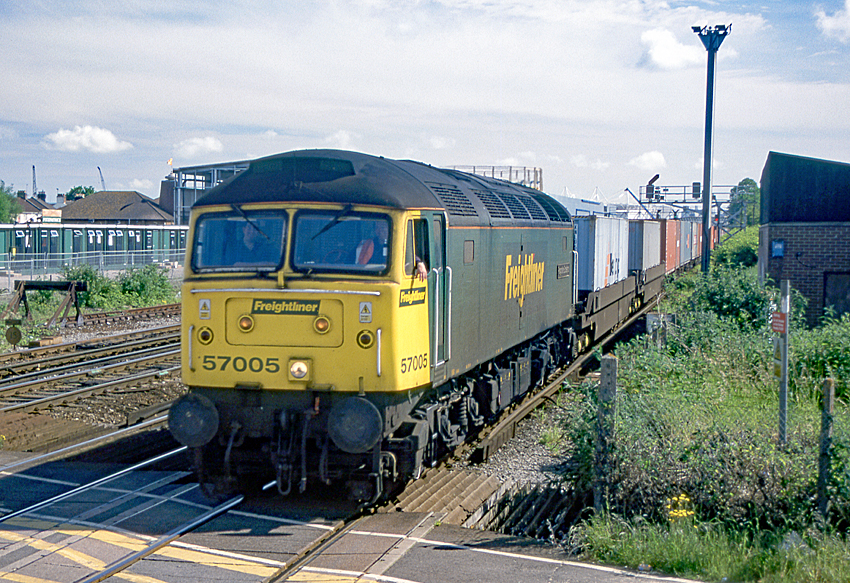
57005 Freightliner Excellence on container train in 2002

Freightliner's immediate need was for improved reliability from its locomotive fleet. During 1997, the company commissioned Brush Traction to rebuild of six of its Class 47 locomotives to create the Class 57, which was fitted with reconditioned General Motors power units and reworked ex-Class 56 alternator groups. The first of these was released in July 1998, and coincided with the unveiling of the new British Racing Green Freightliner livery. After an evaluation period, Freightliner was sufficiently impressed to order a further six in June 1999, with plans for an eventual fleet of 25. However, in actuality, no additional Class 57 locomotives were delivered to Freightliner, largely due to the company opting to place orders for new-built Class 66s, all being leased from Porterbrook.

During 1999, Freightliner established its Heavy Haul business. In March 2004, Freightliner launched Logico, providing short-term or one-off spaces on intermodal trains, it is typically active at major British freight hubs such as the South Wales International Terminal and the Port of Felixstowe. By 2014, Freightliner was actively trying to increase such trains in response to requests for higher service frequencies from ports.

During 2007, Freightliner commenced operations in Poland; its primary activity in the Polish market has been the haulage of aggregates and coal traffic.

=== Post-privatisation ===
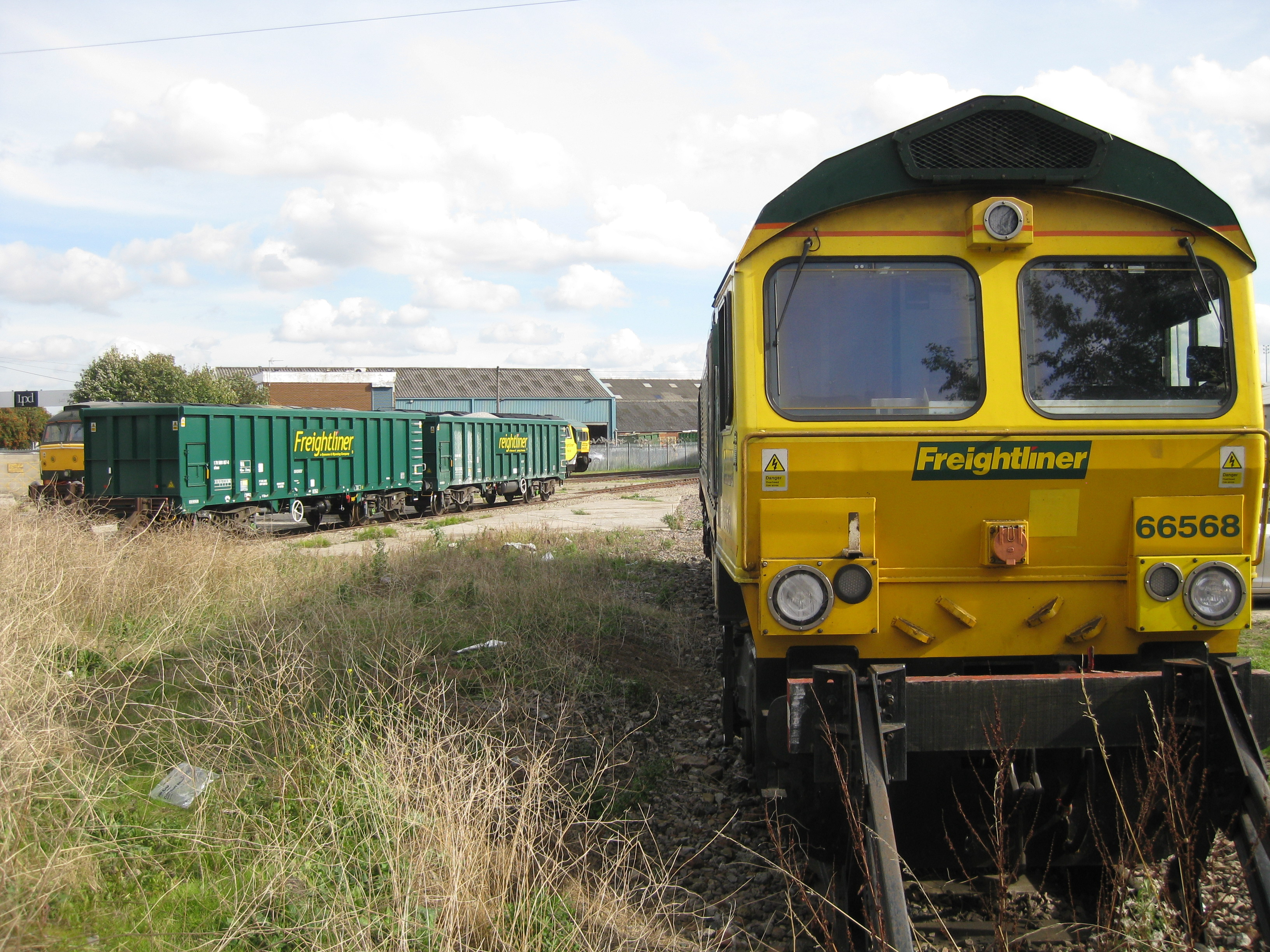
Locomotive Class 66 No.66568 and "Heavy Haul" wagons at the Freightliner Vehicle Maintenance Facility, Leeds

On 13 June 2008, Freightliner Group was purchased by Railinvest Holding Company Limited, a subsidiary of Arcapita Bank of Bahrain.

On 30 June 2009, Freightliner commenced operations in Australia, having secured an initial contract with Namoi Cotton Co-operative to haul containerised processed cotton traffic in New South Wales. Over the following six years, it would become an accredited rail service provider in Western Australia, Southern Australia and Queensland, as well as expanding into hauling coal and other agricultural traffic for various customers in New South Wales.

In February 2015, as part of the sale of Freightliner from Arcapita Bank to Genesee & Wyoming, the latter purchased a 95% shareholding which increased to 100% in 2020. At the time of the acquisition, Freightliner's portfolio comprised approximately 250 standard gauge locomotives along with 5,500 wagons, and had a headcount in excess of 2,500 employees worldwide.

On 12 November 2015, British Rail Class 47 No. 47830 (D1645), which is operated by Freightliner, was named Beeching's Legacy to mark 50 years since the first container train ran under British Rail.

In April 2018, Freightliner unveiled its new brand identity during an event at the NEC Birmingham, bringing the brand inline with parent company Genesee & Wyoming.

On 1 July 2019, it was announced that Freightliner's parent company Genesee & Wyoming is to be bought for US$8.4 billion by a consortium including Brookfield Infrastructure Partners, GIC and Brookfield's institutional partners.

In April 2024, Freightliner UK and Europe split from G&W becoming sister companies, since they were both still owned by Brookfield and GIC.

In September 2025, Freightliner agreed terms to sell the UK intermodal container business to CMA CGM. The sale was completed in January 2026. The UK heavy haul business and European operations were not included in the sale and was retained by Freightliner's existing owners. As the Freightliner brand was included in the sale, the heavy haul business was rebranded Heavy Haul Rail.

== Operations ==
=== United Kingdom ===
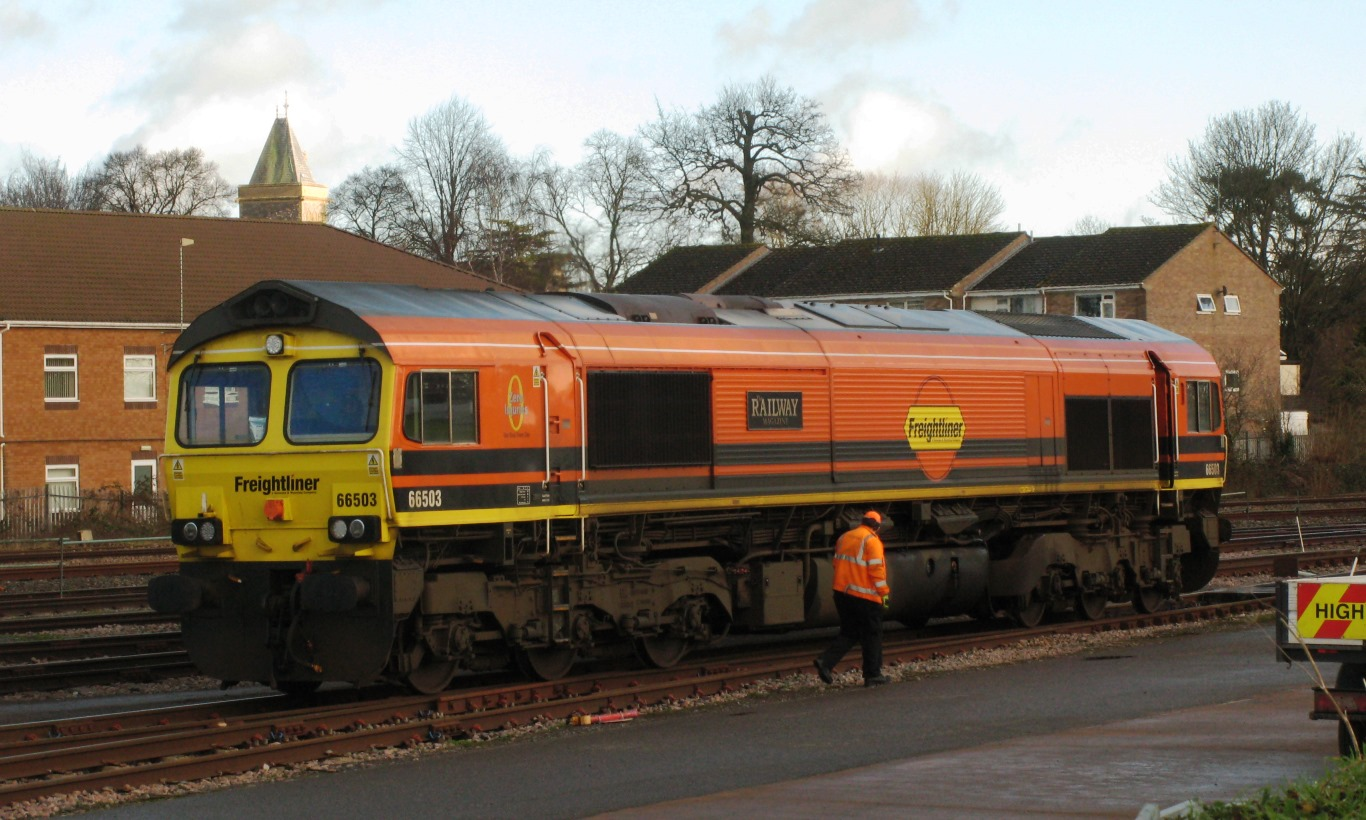
Freightliner 66503 in the latest orange livery at Taunton

When Freightliner was privatised in 1996, it only operated Intermodal container services. These ran from ports including Felixstowe, Southampton and Tilbury to terminals such as Birmingham, Trafford Park in Manchester, Stourton (Leeds), Coatbridge (Central Scotland), Ashton Gate (Bristol), and Wentlooge (Newport, South Wales). The network has been expanded with additional destinations added. Freightliner also operate an extensive road distribution network with 300 road vehicles. Freightliner also provides drivers for Scottish TransPennine Express services.

In 1999, Freightliner set up Heavy Haul initially operating railway infrastructure trains for Network Rail moving ballast, rails etc. before moving into other bulk loads including aggregates, cement, coal, petroleum, scrap metal and waste. Initially run as a division of Freightliner Limited, in 2001 operations were transferred to a new subsidiary, Freightliner Heavy Haul Limited. Reportedly, Heavy Haul operations were hit particularly hard during the Great Recession that started in 2008, but, the firm was actively acquiring additional wagons and staff in order to accommodate new growth on top of the recovery of demand from many of its established customers by 2015. Furthermore, due to a lack of available slots on most mainlines, there was an increased emphasis on running longer trains rather than routing additional ones.

During April 2006, Freightliner Maintenance Limited was established as a separate entity dedicated to the repair and maintenance of traction and rolling stock. It acquired a maintenance depot and took on 13 staff in Leeds from a former supplier that same year, and was promptly made responsible for the maintenance of Freightliner's 75 Heavy Haul locomotives. Within its first three years, the division had extended its scope into wagon maintenance, and was reportedly consistently achieving a 95% availability rate on the company's 657 coal wagons; it also had engineering teams and mobile workshops stationed in Birmingham, London, Bristol, York, Scotland and Crewe that undertook scheduled maintenance along with unexpected call-outs. The subsidiary competitively tenders for maintenance work, without any preference from the rest of the company. By 2011, Freightliner Maintenance was servicing all 111 of the company's UK-based Class 66 locomotives, and had branched into both track maintenance and rail freight development activities as well.

In October 2021, the company switched most of its electric operations to diesel trains due to the increased cost of electricity. One month later, Freightliner announced positive results from an alternative fuel trial it was conducted for its diesel-powered fleet, allegedly halving the carbon emissions incurred.

=== Poland ===
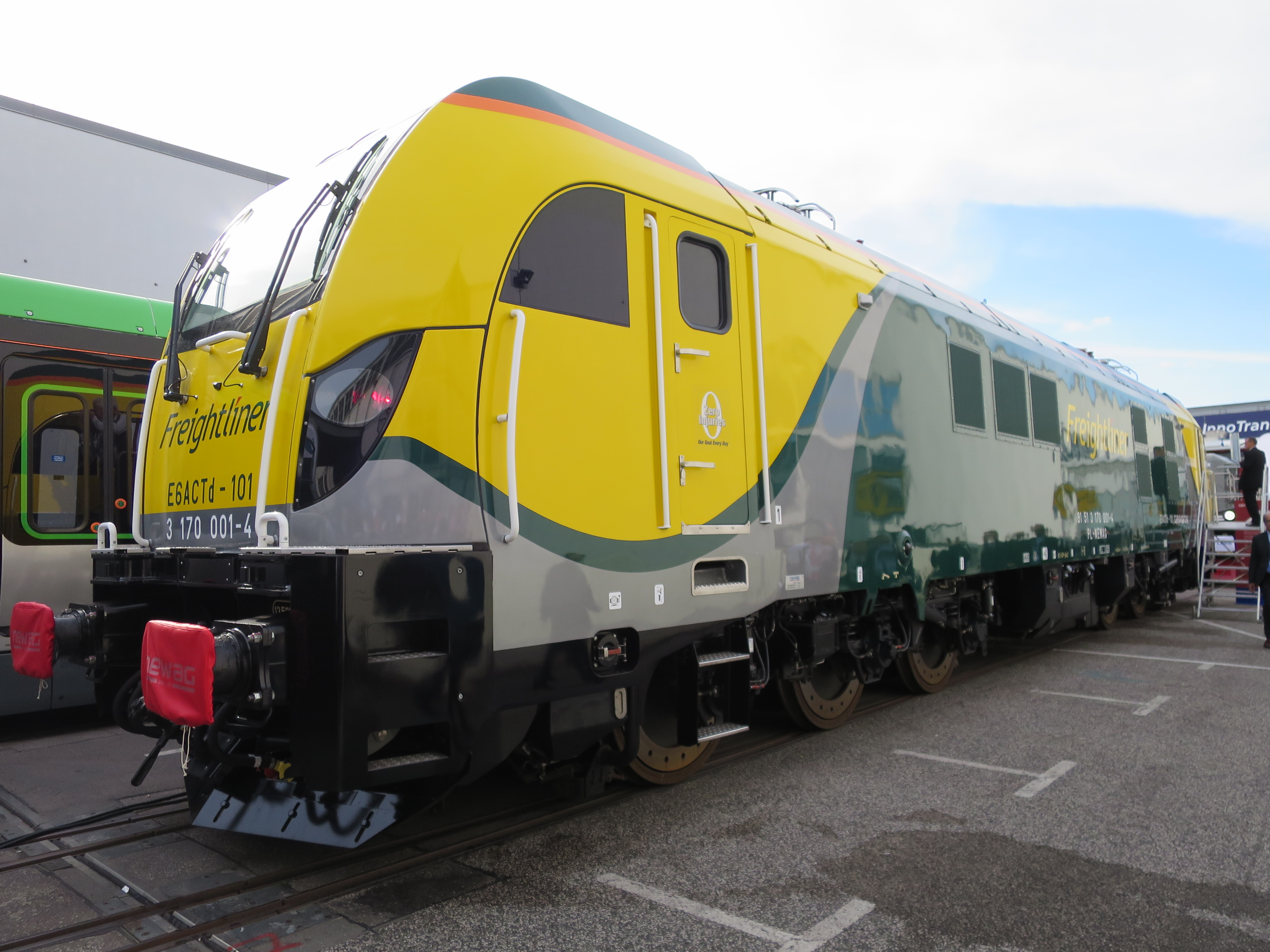
Newag Dragon E6ACTd-101 locomotive of Freightliner PL on show at InnoTrans 2016

During 2006, Freightliner expanded its operations into Poland. A subsidiary company, Freightliner PL Sp. z o.o., was established to bid for contracts hauling coal traffic. The first contract was for coal transport from Lubelski Węgiel Bogdanka SA near Bogdanka (Bogdanka-Lublin coal mine) to Kozienice Power Station. The service began in September 2007. Most of Freightliner PL's services operate on the Gdańsk to Warsaw corridor and in southern Poland. In February 2015, Freightliner PL signed a €17.5M contract to lease five Newag Gliwice 5 MW (6,700 hp) electric six-axle Newag Dragon E6ACTd locomotives from ING Lease. With each equipped with a 520 kW (700 hp) diesel engine for last-mile operation, they are scheduled to be delivered from May to July 2016. Furthermore, Freightliner opted to export 13 of its Class 66 locomotives from the UK to Poland for operations there.

=== Australia ===
Freightliner began exploring opportunities in the Australian rail market with Freightliner Australia established by April 2007. By June 2008 Freightliner Australia had been accredited as a rail operator in the state of New South Wales and by September 2009 also had accreditation in Queensland and Western Australia. In June 2009, Freightliner Australia commenced operating containerised cotton services from Wee Waa to Port Botany. In September 2009 Freightliner Australia signed a 10-year deal with Xstrata to haul export coal from the Hunter Valley to Newcastle, commencing in September 2010. Under the deal, Xstrata owned the rolling stock with Freightliner Australia providing the engineering, logistics, maintenance and operational support. In May 2012 Freightliner Australia commenced operating a Warren to Port Botany service.

In December 2016, Glencore, who had purchased Xsrata, sold its Hunter Valley coal haulage business to Genesee & Wyoming Australia that was also owned by Freightliner's parent company Genesee & Wyoming. Freightliner's Australian business was merged into Genesee & Wyoming Australia and the brand retired.

=== Netherlands ===
In 2013, Freightliner bought Netherlands-based intermodal container operator European Rail Shuttle B.V. from Maersk Line. This subsidiary, has focused on the cross-border intermodal traffic that runs between the northern European ports of Rotterdam, Bremerhaven and Hamburg to various cities across Germany, Poland, Italy and elsewhere in continental Europe. In 2018 the business was sold to Swiss-based Hupac.

== Fleet ==
=== United Kingdom ===
Freightliner inherited a fleet of ageing Class 47 diesel locomotives and Class 86 and Class 90 electric locomotives from British Rail.

In 1997, Freightliner placed an order for six Class 57 locomotives. These were rebuilt by Brush Traction at Loughborough from Class 47s and fitted with a refurbished EMD engine and a reconditioned alternator, improving reliability and performance. The first was delivered in July 1998. After an evaluation period Freightliner was sufficiently impressed to order a further six in June 1999.

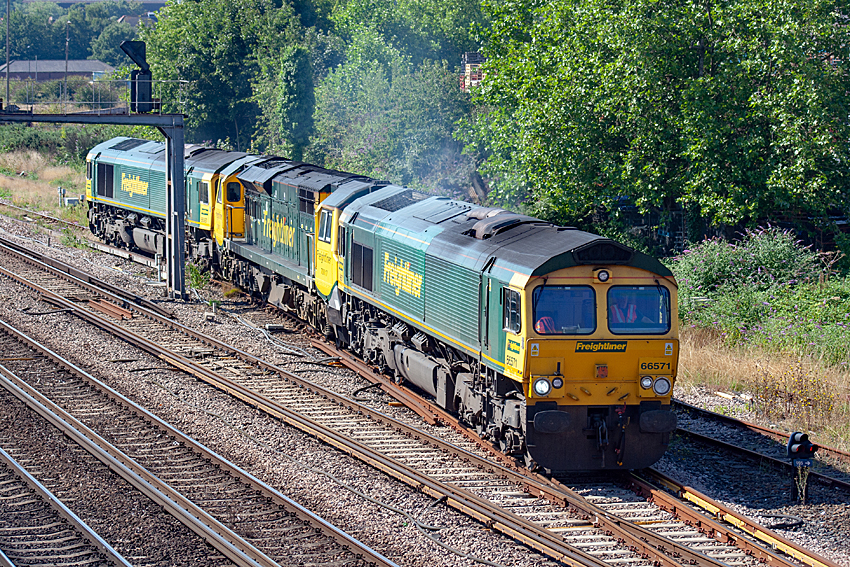
66571 heading 70017 and 66587 towards Eastleigh

During the late 1990s and early 2000s, Freightliner placed multiple orders for new-build Class 66s, cumulating in 111 locomotives being delivered to the company. In order to better haul heavier trains, Freightliner directed that several of its Class 66s be regeared, which resulted in a reduced maximum speed in exchange for a higher tractive effort. Once in service, the type proved to be quite reliable, with Freightliner reportedly recording a regular availability rate of 98% along with an average of 70,000 miles between failures, more than double that of the Class 57 fleet. By 2004, the company's Class 66s had replaced all of the Class 47s, as well as the Class 57s after another two years. Freightliner also leased some Class 66s that had been formerly operated by Direct Rail Services.

During November 2007, Freightliner announced an order for 30 Class 70s under a project called Project Genesis. The first two were delivered in November 2009. These have released a number of Class 66s with five going to Colas Rail, 13 to Freightliner Poland and four to GB Railfreight.

Freightliner also used their single Class 47 (47830) on driver route learning. In 2024, 47830 was sold to Locomotive Services Limited and was repainted into BR Green.

=== Poland ===
Freightliner PL ordered seven EMD Class 66s as well as 432 Greenbrier Eamnoss type coal hopper wagons. These have been supplemented by an EMD Class 66 formerly used by Häfen und Güterverkehr Köln and 12 Class 66s transferred from Freightliner's UK operations. A 13th was sent from the UK in October 2012. These units underwent various modifications to allow them to operate on the Polish network.

=== Australia ===
Freightliner Australia commenced operations using hired in GL class locomotives from Chicago Freight Car Leasing Australia (CFCLA). After a longer-term lease was agreed, two were repainted into Freightliner livery in September 2010. The Warren service that commenced in May 2012 also used locomotives hired from CFCLA. Two CF class locomotives were repainted in Freightliner livery. The Xstrata coal contract was operated by XRN class locomotives that were owned by the customer. Wagon types are PHEH and PHYH for the coal traffic and CQBY, CQFY and CQYY on the grain traffic.

In January 2015 two G class locomotives were purchased.

== Fleet detail ==
=== United Kingdom ===
Class	Image	Type	Built	Wheel arr.	In traffic	Numbers	Notes
08		Diesel shunter	1953	0-6-0	0	~~08077, 08530, 08531, 08575, 08585, 08624, 08691, 08764, 08785, 08891~~	Sold to Freightliner (CMA CGM) in 2026.
59		Diesel locomotive	1985-1995	Co-Co	4	59001, 59002, 59004, 59005	Acquired from Mendip Rail in 2019, operated by Freightliner Group's Heavy Haul Rail after the split of the UK business in 2026.
59		Diesel locomotive	1985-1995	Co-Co	4	59101-59104	Acquired from Mendip Rail in 2019, operated by Freightliner Group's Heavy Haul Rail after the split of the UK business in 2026.
59		Diesel locomotive	1985-1995	Co-Co	6	59201-59206	Acquired from DB Cargo UK in 2019. Operated by Freightliner Group's Heavy Haul Rail after the split of the UK business in 2026
66		Diesel locomotive	1999-2008	Co-Co	7	66413-66416, 66418-66420	Acquired from Direct Rail Services in 2011. 66411, 66412 & 66417 exported to Poland for Freightliner PL. Remaining UK locomotives operated by Freightliner Group's Heavy Haul Rail after the split of the UK business in 2026.
66		Diesel locomotive	1999-2008	Co-Co	29	66507, 66520, 66522, 66534, 66536, 66537, 66545, 66546, 66547, 66548, 66550, 66555, 66556, 66557, 66558, 66559, 66560, 66561, 66562, 66563, 66564, 66565, 66566, 66585, 66587, 66588, 66589, 66590, 66594	Original series bought by Freightliner was 66501–66599. 66521 written off after Great Heck rail crash. 66527, 66530, 66535, 66582, 66583, 66584, 66586 and 66595 have been exported to Poland for Freightliner PL. 66573-581 have been sold to Colas Rail and GB Railfreight and renumbered 66846-850 and 66738-741 respectively. 49 locomotives sold to Freightliner (CMA CGM) in 2026. Remaining UK locomotives operated by Freightliner Group's Heavy Haul Rail after the split of the UK business in 2026.
66		Diesel locomotive	1999-2008	Co-Co	19	66601-66607, 66610, 66613-66623	66608, 66609, 66611, 66612, 66624 and 66625 have been exported to Poland for Freightliner PL. Remaining UK locomotives operated by Freightliner Group's Heavy Haul Rail after the split of the UK business in 2026.
66		Diesel locomotive	1999-2008	Co-Co	4	66951, 66952 66953, 66957	Remaining UK locomotives operated by Freightliner Group's Heavy Haul Rail after the split of the UK business in 2026.
70		Diesel locomotive	2009-2011	Co-Co	19	70001-70011, 70013-70020	70012 dropped while being unloaded at Newport; returned to manufacturers and is used as a test bed. All operated by Freightliner Group's Heavy Haul Rail after the split of the UK business in 2026.
90		Electric locomotive	1987-1990	Bo-Bo	0	~~90003-90016,90018~~; ~~90040-90049~~	90018 & 90040 sold by DB Cargo UK to Freightliner in April 2024 All sold to Freightliner (CMA CGM) in 2026. All operated by Freightliner Group's Heavy Haul Rail after the split of the UK business in 2026.
Total					92		

=== Poland ===
Class	Image	Type	Introduced	Wheel arr.	In traffic	Numbers
EMD Series 66		Diesel	2006-07	Co-Co	13	66008-011, 013-015 & 66601-606
Newag Dragon E6ACTd		Electric (Diesel last-mile slave)	2016	Co-Co	5	E6ACTd-101 – E6ACTd-105

=== Germany ===
Class	Image	Type	Wheel arr.	Notes
EMD Series 66		Diesel locomotive	Co-Co	
Stadler Euro Dual		Multi-system	Co-Co	Leased from Alpha Trains in 2026

=== Australia ===
Class	Type	Introduced	Wheel arr	In traffic	Numbers	Notes
GL	Diesel	1971/72 remanufactured 2004	Co-Co	2	GL111, GL112	leased from Chicago Freight Car Leasing Australia
XRN	Diesel	2010-12	Co-Co	30	XRN001-030	owned by Xstrata
CF	Diesel	2013	Co-Co	2	CF4407, CF4408	leased from Chicago Freight Car Leasing Australia
G	Diesel	1988	Co-Co	2	G533, G535	

=== Netherlands ===
Class	Type	Introduced	Wheel arr.	In traffic	Numbers	Notes
Vossloh G1206	Diesel		Bo-Bo	3		Shunting and local operations
Vossloh G 2000	Diesel		Bo-Bo	1		Shunting and local operations
EMD Class 66	Diesel		Co-Co			Withdrawn, lease ended
BR182 (Siemens ES 64 U2)	Electric		Bo-Bo	1		
BR185 (Bombardier TRAXX)	Electric		Bo-Bo	2		
BR189 (Siemens ES 64 F4)	Electric		Bo-Bo	12		

== See also ==
- Intermodal railfreight in Great Britain
