= Dollands Moor Freight Yard =

Railway freight yard near Folkestone in Kent

Coordinates: 51°5′30″N 1°5′52″E

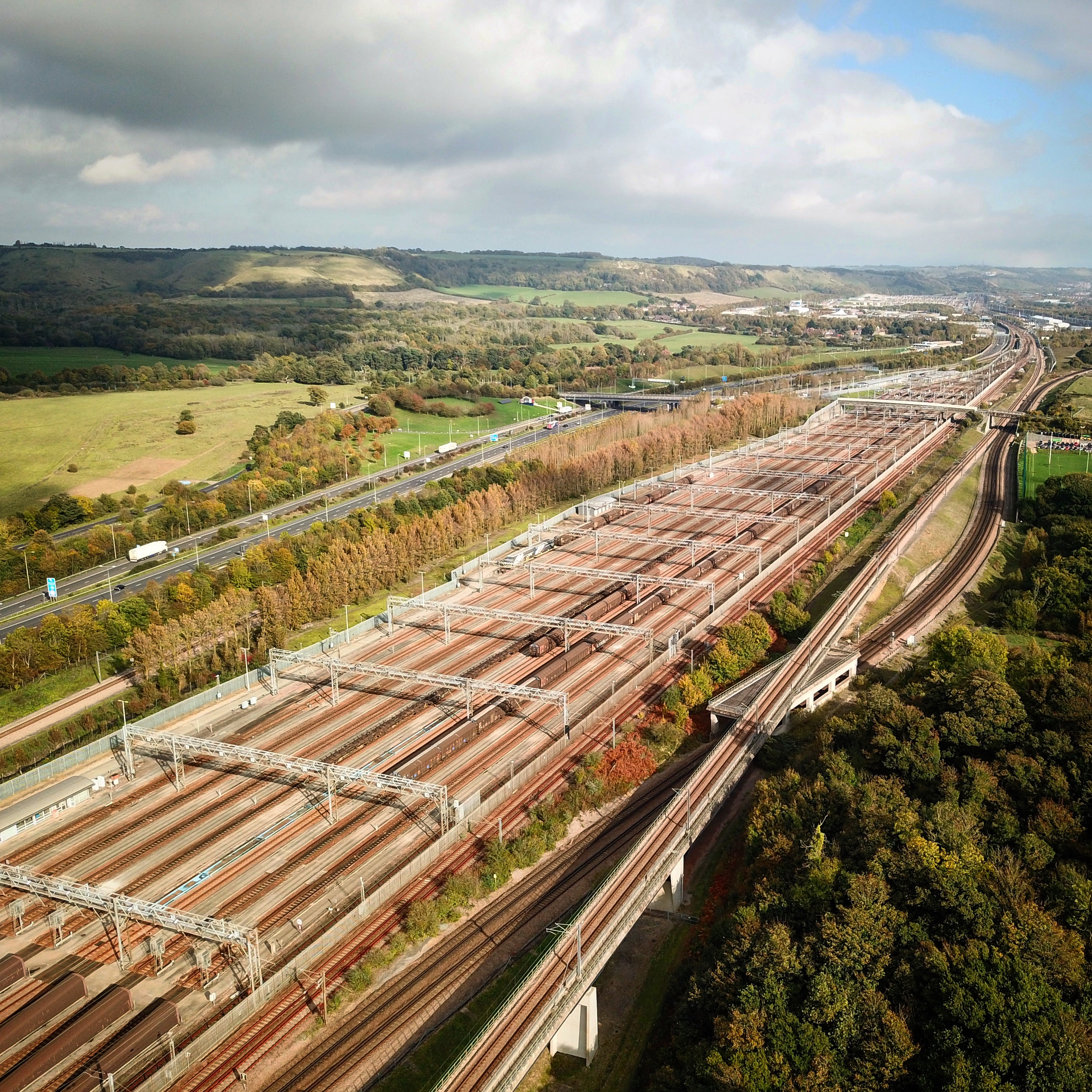
Dollands Moor Freight Terminal, the international freight terminal serving the Channel Tunnel. The Eurotunnel Folkestone Terminal, used by cars, coaches and lorries catching the Eurotunnel Shuttle, is visible in the distance.

Dollands Moor Freight Yard is a railway freight yard near Folkestone in Kent, and was purpose built in 1988 for the Channel Tunnel. It is to the west of the Eurotunnel Folkestone Terminal, and just to the south of the M20 Motorway.

== Description ==
Dollands Moor has eight roads in the yard with an additional five roads which are through lines and run-round loops. All lines are electrified at 25 kV overhead wires and connections to the west of the yard are also dually electrified with a third rail (750 V). This is to allow access to the South-Eastern Main Line at Saltwood Junction just to the east of Sandling Station. Dollands Moor was operated by Railfreight Distribution from its opening, then EWS and now DB Cargo UK. Other freight operators pass through the yard, but do not stop there.

The function of Dollands Moor is for locomotive and crew changes rather than marshalling. Most trains operating from Dollands Moor are of the Trainload variety and if any marshalling is required, this was historically undertaken at European Freight Operating Centre in Wembley, but with the drawdown of the Wagonload network in the UK they now go to Didcot. At the time of writing (October 2015) just one Fridays only working Wagonload train goes through Dollands Moor to Didcot

The lines from Dollands Moor and the Channel Tunnel Rail Link are measured in kilometres whereas Network Rail lines are measured in miles and chains.

== Migratory activity ==
Illegal immigrants have been a problem for Dollands Moor; and stowaways have caused increased security and safety incidents.
