= Hanson Traction =

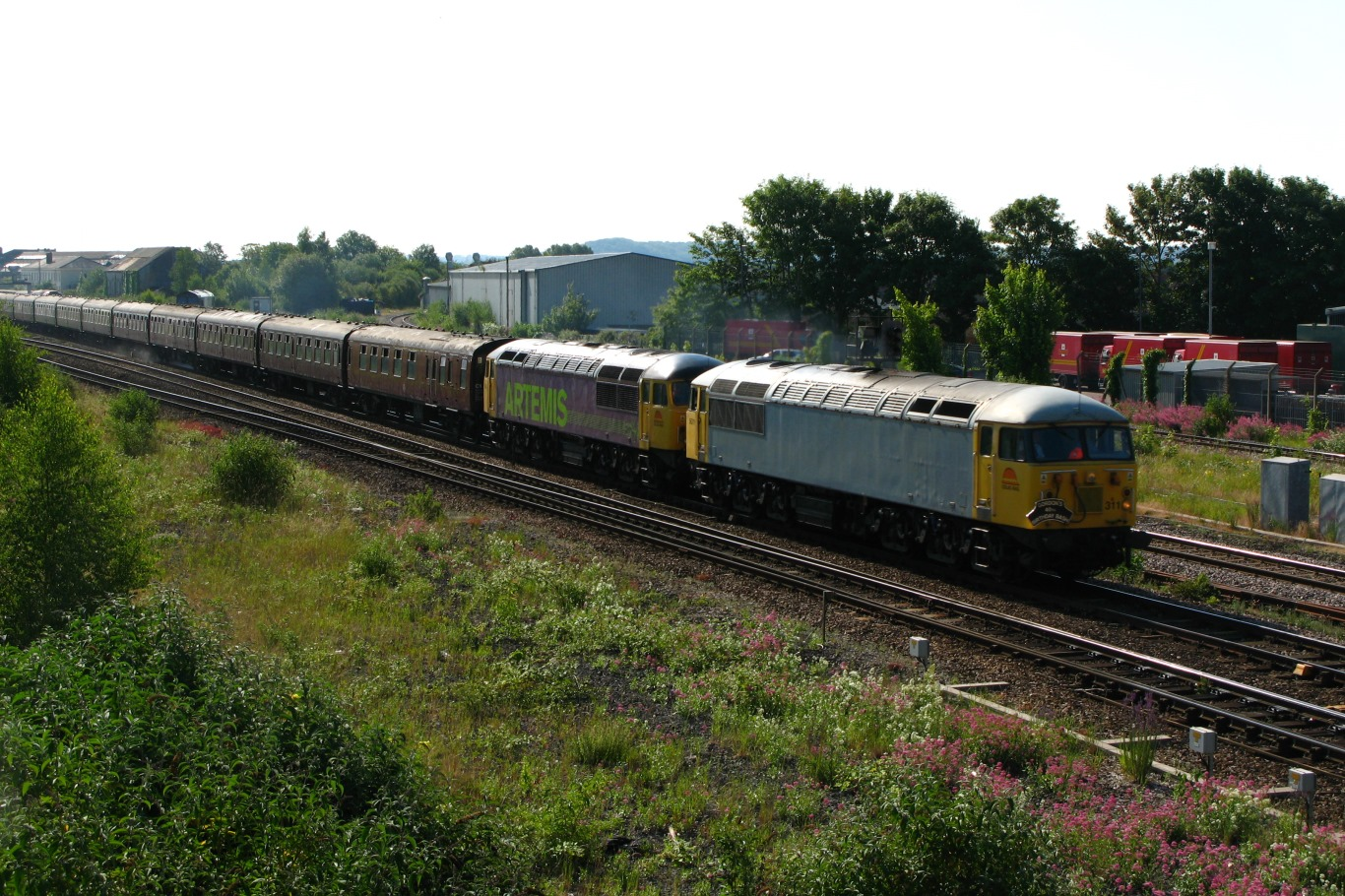
56311 and 56312 working a passenger charter train

Hanson Traction Ltd was a locomotive leasing company based at Washwood Heath, Birmingham, West Midlands.

The company owned thirteen locomotives, consisting of seven class 56s, one class 50 and five class 31s. They were the first company to return class 56 locomotives to mainline use in the United Kingdom after the previous fleet (operated by Fastline) was withdrawn in 2008, owing to a decline in traffic levels (specifically the intermodal arm).

In October 2010, the company was merged into the operations of British American Railway Services and the locomotives rebranded as part of their Devon & Cornwall Railways fleet with ultimate ownership by RMS Locotec, part of the wider group.

== History ==
Hanson Traction was founded by IT entrepreneur Garcia J Hanson in 2006. The company purchased Neil Boden's preserved class 56, BR large logo blue liveried No. 56057 British Fuels in 2008. The locomotive later became 56311 and was painted into a non-standard yellow & grey colour scheme at the Railway Technical Centre in Derby. Purchase of a second class 56, Load Haul liveried No. 56003 followed shortly afterwards—this became 56312 and was repainted into the Artemis livery which consisted of a purple bodyside, yellow cabs, grey roof and large green ARTEMIS name complete with squiggly green vinyls. Both of these 56s returned to the mainline in late 2008 and have seen use with Colas Rail, having appeared on their Washwood Heath to Immingham & Boston to Washwood Heath steel workings (the former was a short lived trial run), Dagenham to Dollands Moor "Transfesa" trains and Dollands Moor to Hams Hall Norfolk Line container workings. They have also been used on track machine movements and excursion trains from time to time.

56312 was repainted again in October 2011 and wore the same livery as 56311, this being a non-standard grey and yellow colour scheme with 'DCR' (Devon & Cornwall Railways) logos and advertising for the June 2012 Railfest event (DCR being a subsidiary of British American Railway Services, the present owners of Hanson Traction). As of August 2012 the Railfest event logos and advertising have been removed.

Two further 56s, No's 56114 and 56128 were also purchased with the view to returning them to the mainline when traffic levels required. However, 56128 has remained in storage at Wansford (Nene Valley Railway) since 2008 and now appears to have an uncertain future. 56114 has donated its power unit to 56311, and was stripped of usable parts & scrapped in March 2012.

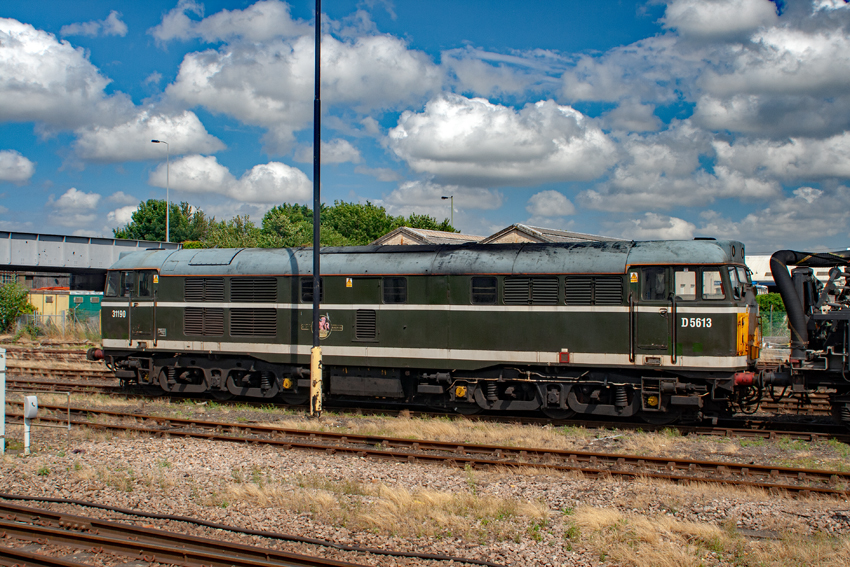
31190 at Eastleigh

Hanson Traction also own class 31s No. 31190 & No. 31602 plus class 50 No. 50008. 31190 has been used mainly on route learning runs for DB Schenker, Network Rail & DCR during 2010 and 2011. 50008 is currently residing at the BARS depot in Washwood Heath where it is undergoing repairs and reinstatement of the vacuum braking & AWS equipment removed for the abortive move to Peru some years ago. It has been repainted into the unique BR "Laira blue" livery, which it carried when it was in service with British Rail. 31452 has remained inactive during 2011 after a brief period of hire use with DB Schenker for Network Rail test trains during 2010.

Neil Boden's BR blue class 47 No. 47270 Swift had a short spell with Hanson Traction before he parted ways with the company to form Boden Rail Ltd in early 2010. He had initially joined the company when 56311 (057) was acquired, which he owned and operated at the Nene Valley Railway whilst it was in preservation.

Hanson Traction's core depot was the former Alstom facility at Washwood Heath in the West Midlands, which it began using in 2009.

In October 2010, the company was purchased by British American Railway Services (BARS).

The acquisition of Hanson Traction by BARS means that the combined assets now include six class 31s, five class 56s (three operational and two stored, a sixth loco was subsequently scrapped in November 2011) and one class 50, plus a wide variety of coaching stock and other vehicles.
