= British Rail Class 56 =

Class of diesel electric locomotives

British Rail Class 56; Electroputere LDE 3500
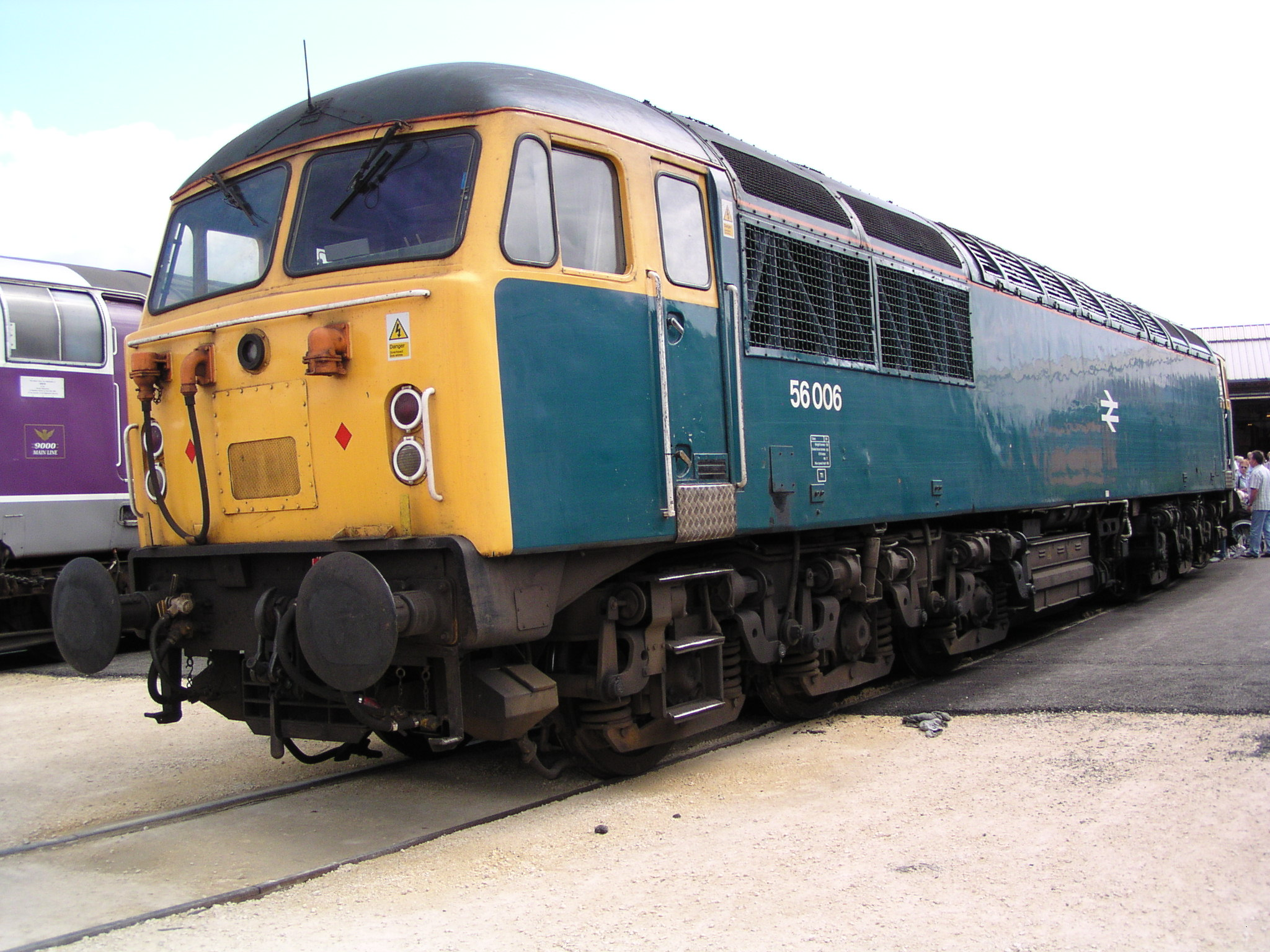
- A Class 56 at Doncaster Works in 2003
Type and origin
- Power type: Diesel-electric
- Builder: Electroputere 56001–56030; BREL Doncaster 56031–56114; BREL Crewe 56115-56135
- Model: LDE3500
- Build date: 1976–1984
- Total produced: 135
Specifications
- Configuration
  - UIC: Co′Co′
  - Commonwealth: Co-Co
- Gauge: 4 ft 8 1/2 in (1,435 mm) standard gauge
- Length: 63 ft 6 in (19.35 m)
- Width: 9 ft 2 in (2.79 m)
- Height: 12 ft 9 in (3.89 m)
- Loco weight: 123 long tons (125 t)
- Fuel capacity: 1,150 imp gal (5,200 L; 1,380 US gal)
- Prime mover: Ruston-Paxman 16RK3CT
- Alternator: Brush BA1101A
- Traction motors: Brush TM73-62
- MU working: ◆ Red Diamond
- Train heating: None
- Train brakes: Air
Performance figures
- Maximum speed: 80 mph (129 km/h)
- Power output: Engine: 3,250 bhp (2,424 kW); at rail: 2,400 bhp (1,790 kW)
- Tractive effort: Maximum: 61,800 lbf (275 kN); Continuous: 53,950 lbf (240 kN) at 16.8 mph (27 km/h)
- Brakeforce: 59 long tons-force (588 kN)
Career
- Operators: British Rail; Colas Rail; English Welsh & Scottish; Fastline; Floyd Zrt.; UK Rail Leasing; Ghana Railway Development Authority
- Numbers: 56001–56135
- Nicknames: Gridirons, Grids
- Axle load class: Route availability 7
- Withdrawn: 1991-present
- Disposition: 3 preserved; 35 still in service; 16 converted to Class 69; remainder scrapped.

The British Rail Class 56 is a type of diesel locomotive designed for heavy freight work. It is a Type 5 locomotive, with a Ruston-Paxman power unit developing 3,250 bhp (2,420 kW), and has a Co-Co wheel arrangement. Enthusiasts nicknamed them "Gridirons" (or "Grids" for short), due to the grid-like horn cover on the locomotive's cab ends fitted to nos. 56056 onwards. Under its Romanian railway factory nomenclature, the locomotive was named Electroputere LDE 3500, with LDE coming from Locomotivă Diesel-Electrică (Diesel-Electric Locomotive) and the 3500 being the planned horsepower output.

The Class 56 fleet was introduced between 1976 and 1984, a total of 135 examples were manufactured. The first 30 locomotives (56001 - 56030, factory classification LDE3500) were built by Electroputere in Romania, but these typically suffered from poor construction standards and many were withdrawn from service early for extensive rebuilding before re-entering revenue service. The remaining 105 locomotives were built by British Rail Engineering Limited (BREL) at Doncaster Works (56031 to 56115) and Crewe Works (56116 to 56135).

== Background ==
=== Origins ===
During the early 1970s, it became clear to British Rail planners that a new Type 5 locomotive to handle heavy freight services would be needed. However, ambitions to produce such a fleet were somewhat hamstrung by cutbacks at many of Britain's major railway workshops, having lost many skilled staff through multiple restructurings and cost saving drives; according to railway author Rodger Bradley, such moves proved to have come at a substantial long term cost to the nation's railway engineering capabilities.

Accordingly, in 1974, BR placed an order for 60 freight locomotives, which were originally intended to be separately constructed in two batches of 30 at BREL's Doncaster Works and Brush Traction, Loughborough respectively. However, Brush had already reached the maximum capacity of their Loughborough site via several unrelated projects, making it unrealistic to perform the work in-house as had been foreseen. To overcome its constraints, the company's managers opted to subcontract its batch to the Romanian locomotive manufacturer Electroputere.

On 29 April 1977, the first Class 56 locomotive to be constructed by Electroputere was handed over to British Rail, having been transported from Romania by ship via the port of Harwich. At one point, it was reportedly planned to deliver 20 locomotives each year; however, this ambitious schedule did not come to pass without consequence. The 30 Romanian locomotives (Nos. 56 001 – 56 030) were found to have a relatively poor build quality; to effectively address this, the majority had to be withdrawn from service for extensive rebuilding within their first few years of operation, after which they were re-introduced to service with better performance.

=== Follow-on orders and work redistribution ===
At an early stage of the programme, BR had indicated its intention to place a follow-on order for the type following the delivery of the first 30 locomotives. Accordingly, the number ordered was increased to 135 and they were numbered as follows:

- 56001 to 56030, built by Electroputere, Romania
- 56031 to 56115, built by BREL, Doncaster Works
- 56116 to 56135, built by BREL, Crewe Works

BREL's Doncaster Works were in heavy demand at this time and its resources would be stretched to meet these targets due to a lack of skilled personnel to manufacture mechanical components. Instead the Ashford, Eastleigh and Swindon Works produced sub-assemblies; roofs, fuel tanks and cab frames were produced at Ashford, while cab desks were built at Eastleigh, and radiator housings were supplied from Swindon. Final assembly was transferred from Doncaster Works to Crewe Works, allowing Doncaster to commence work on the new Class 58 heavy freight locomotive.

As a consequence of poor experiences with the early Romanian-built members of the class, the subsequent locomotives featured significant modifications. It had been largely due to the initially negative experiences with the Class 56, which had caused dissatisfaction amongst several of British Rail's freight customers, that BR officials had initiated work on the Class 58 and then the Class 60.

== Technical details ==
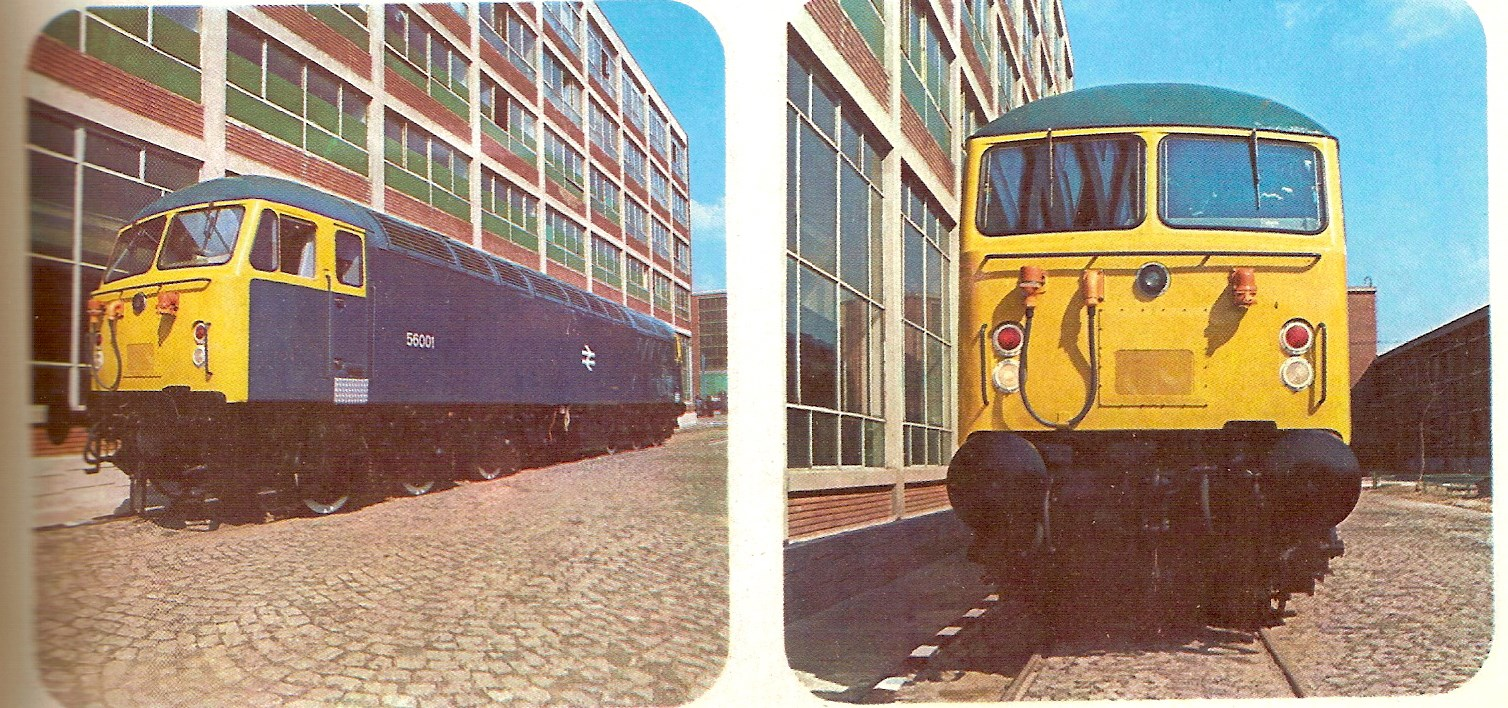
Builder's portrait of BR 56001 in the premises of the Electroputere works, Craiova, SR Romania (1976)

The Class 56 is a heavy freight-orientated diesel-electric locomotive. When specifying its requirements for the Class 56, BR stipulated that its bodyshell design and many mechanism parts would be from Brush Traction's existing Class 47 design, minus some features such as the obsolete headcode panel. Accordingly, it features a stress-skin manner of construction that was paired with an all-welded monocoque superstructure assembly.

The engine and electrical systems were new. The engine is a single Ruston-Paxman-built power unit, the final development of the English Electric CSVT engine, following on from the 16CSVT used in the Class 50. Their changes included significantly uprated turbochargers, gear-driven camshafts in place of the timing chain, and uprated cylinder heads, fuel pumps and injectors. The engine was nominally rated at 3,520 hp (2,620 kW), but was set at 3,250 hp (2,420 kW) for rail use.

One key advance in the Class 56 was the use of self-exciting alternators rather than direct current (DC) generators for the generation of both traction current and auxiliary supply. This change reportedly results in the power unit being considerably more robust, as well as greatly reducing the risk of flash-overs and other earth-related faults. Traction supply was rectified since the type employs DC traction motors. Much of the auxiliary apparatus, such as the compressors and traction motor blowers, were powered via the unrectified three-phase AC output of the auxiliary alternator, and therefore run at a speed proportional to engine r.p.m.

Another key design change started on the Class 56 was its braking system; it was the first diesel locomotive operated by British Rail to be built only with air train brakes, specifically the Davies and Metcalfe E70 system. Earlier locomotives had variously been fitted with vacuum train brakes or an often complex dual-braking arrangement.

== Operation ==
=== Overview ===
During its service life, the Class 56 has proved to be a strong and capable locomotive, being noticeably less prone to wheelslip than the newer Class 58s. However, the type's maintenance needs were relatively high even amongst its contemporaries, such as the Class 58. Notwithstanding bouts of significant investment into the Class 56 during the 1990s by operators such as Transrail and Loadhaul, the locomotive has proven to be somewhat uneconomic to operate in comparison to more modern types, such as the Class 66, in terms of availability or maintenance costs. This disadvantage led to the majority of the fleet being withdrawn during the early twenty-first century.

=== Previous operators ===
==== British Rail ====
On 4 August 1976, 56001 and 56002 were loaded for shipping from Zeebrugge to Harwich. They were towed from Harwich to Tinsley on 7 August. Initial trials were conducted on the Settle-Carlisle Line. Subsequent examples (of the Romanian deliveries) went to Barrow Hill depot for preparation and subsequent commissioning on test trains from Tinsley, usually to Peterborough West Yard. The test train consisted of a rake of rail-carrying flat wagons, with a former East Coast Metro-Cammell Pullman vehicle marshalled immediately behind the locomotive. Testing of Doncaster-built examples was completed using the traditional Doncaster works test train, running north along the East Coast Main Line.

One class member, BREL-built no. 56042, was chosen to test the CP3 bogies that were fitted to the Class 58s. It was the first of the class to be withdrawn in 1991 after only 12 years service and scrapped three years later in 1994 at Toton TMD.

==== EWS ====
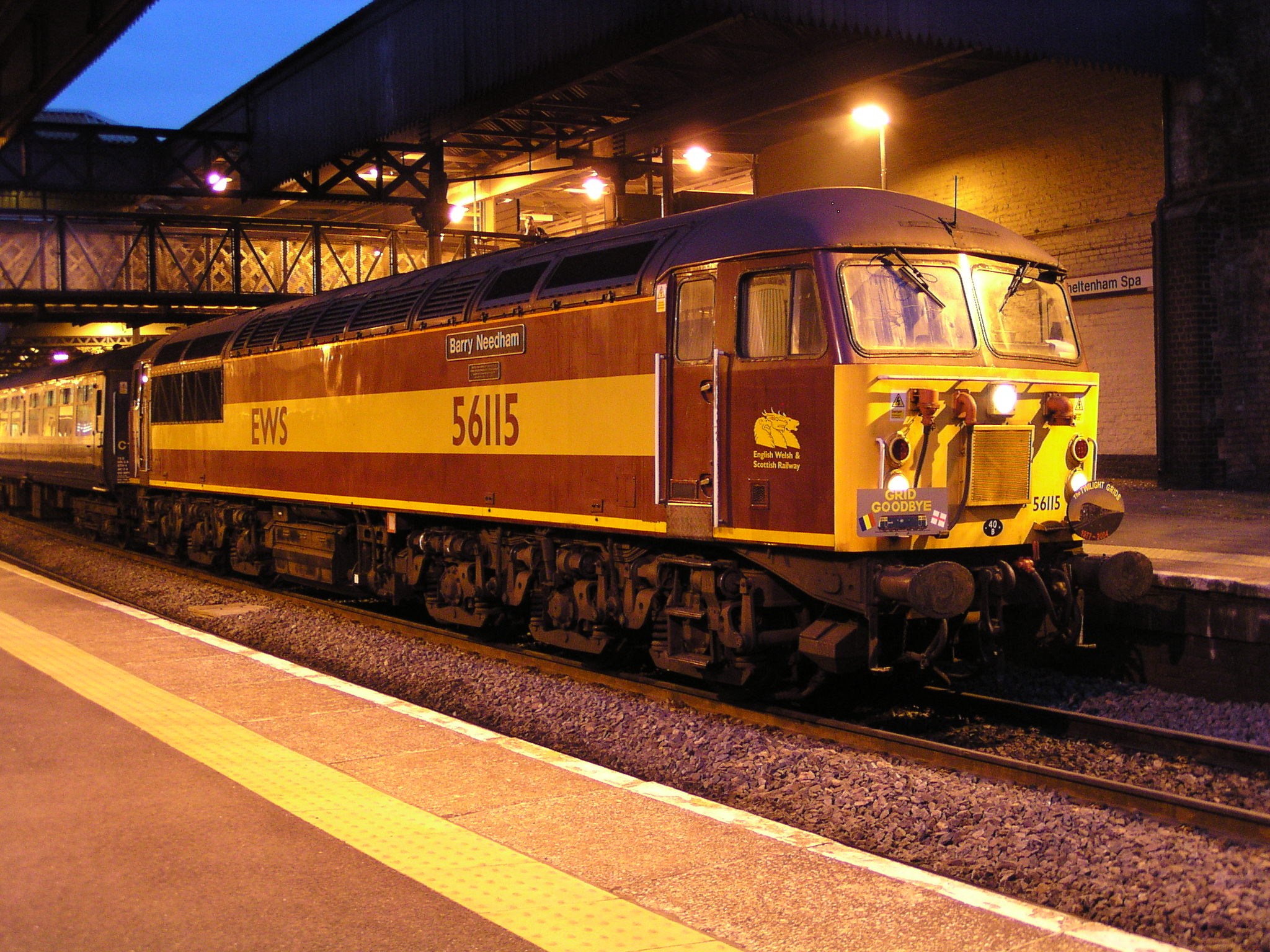
56115 on a railtour.

The entire class passed to English Welsh & Scottish (EWS) in 1995, when it purchased the Loadhaul, Mainline Freight and Transrail Freight companies from British Rail. Withdrawals commenced in the 1990s, with the last withdrawn on 31 March 2004. Some were reinstated for use on construction trains connected with the LGV Est in France, although all such locomotives have now returned to the UK.

In September 2011, DB Schenker (as EWS had become) placed its remaining 33 stored class 56s up for sale with most expected to be sold for scrap.

UK-based locomotive provider Europhoenix tendered for three of the DB Schenker locomotives (56018, 56115, 56117) for export to Hungarian freight operator Floyd. They finally bought 56101 (from preservation), 56115 and 56117. With 56101 moving to Europhoenix, 56018 has been sold to preservationist Ed Stevenson. 56101 arrived in Hungary on 19 June 2012 with 56115 and 56117 following later in the year. These have been renumbered 0659-001-5, 0659-002-3 and 0659-003-1 respectively.

In late 2011, DB Cargo UK sold 27 Class 56s for scrap to European Metal Recycling. These were 56006, 031, 032, 037, 038, 046, 049, 051, 058, 060, 065, 069, 073, 074, 077, 078, 081, 087, 090, 094, 096, 104, 105, 106, 112, 113, 133. Despite the mass sale of scrap, 56078, 087, 094, 105 and 113 were sold on to Colas Rail while UK Rail Leasing has bought a number of Class 56s, to form a pool of hire locomotives.

==== Fastline ====
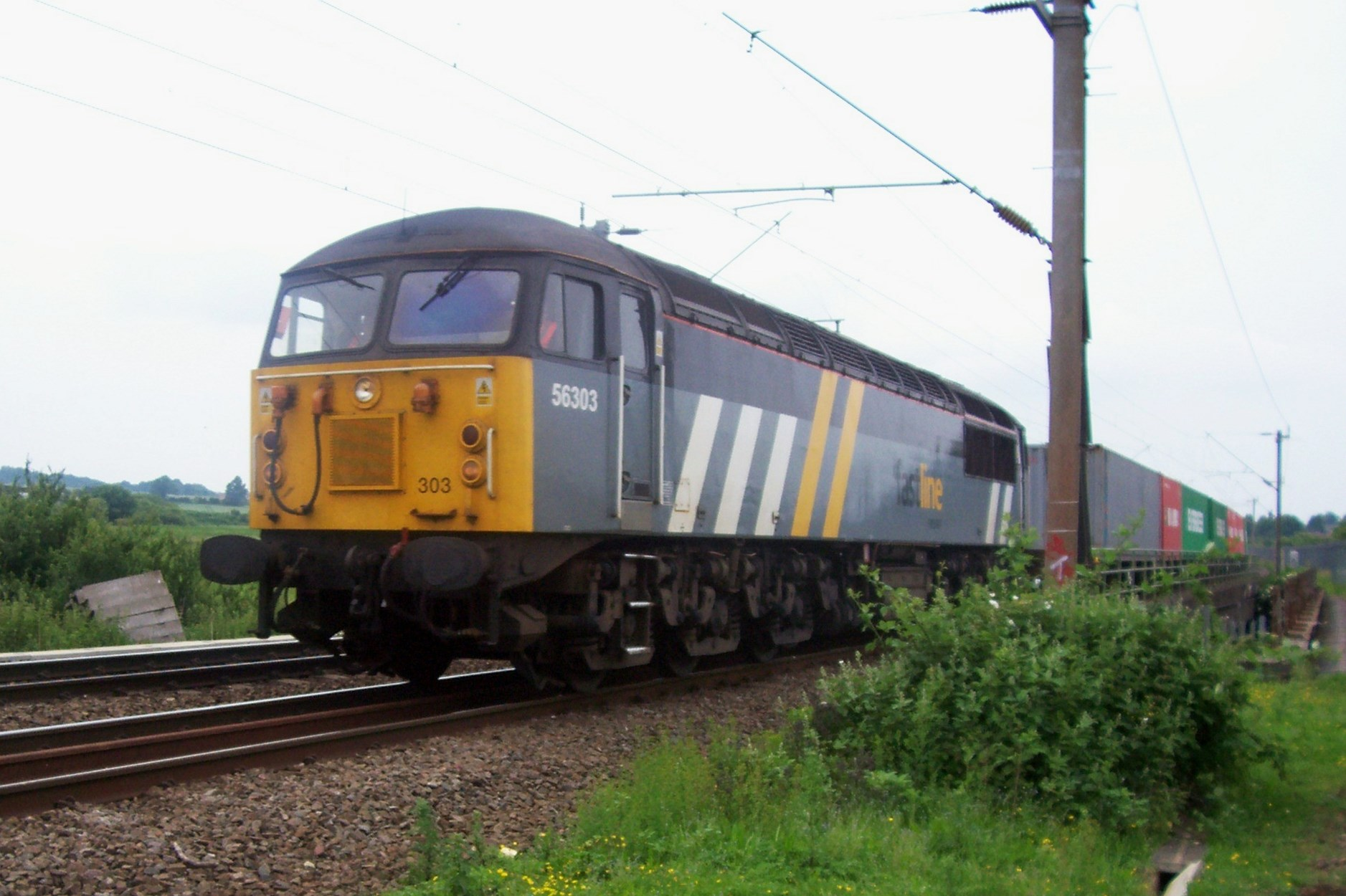
Fastline 56303 passing Kingsthorpe, just north of Northampton station, 2007

In 2006, three locomotives (56045, 56124 and 56125) were overhauled at Brush Traction and renumbered as 56301, 56302 and 56303 for Fastline, the British freight company launched by Jarvis. They were used on intermodal traffic. The small fleet never achieved particularly impressive availability, and there were significant problems with bogies, turbochargers, and low power. Fastline dispensed with Class 56 operation due to the loss of intermodal traffic and operated Class 66s on their coal traffic until March 2010 when the company went bankrupt.

Locomotive 56301 was put into store, and 56302 was purchased and run by Colas Rail. Locomotive 56301 was later purchased by the Class 56 Group as a replacement for their own 56040 Oystermouth after the latter had suffered a catastrophic failure. 56040 was subsequently stripped of spares and scrapped at Barrow Hill.

==== British American Railway Services (BARS) / Devon & Cornwall Railways (DCR) ====
Formerly preserved 56057 (renumbered 56311) and 56003 (renumbered 56312) were operated by British American Railway Services under their Devon and Cornwall Railways subsidiary (formerly Hanson Traction), these were frequently hired to Colas Rail to work their intermodal services between Dollands Moor and Hams Hall, steel diagrams between Boston and Washwood Heath and their Dagenham to Dollands Moor "Transfesa" workings in London, supplementing Colas Rail's own class 47/7 fleet. British American Railway Services currently use 56311 and 56312, along with 56303, on their own freight flows including scrap metal flows between Cardiff and the North-East, landfill flows between Wembley and Calvert and for stock moves. During 2011, 56312 was repainted into the same grey livery as 56311, but with advertising for the National Railway Museum's forthcoming 'Railfest 2012' event displayed on the body side (this has since been removed).

In December 2013 it was moved from Wansford (Nene Valley Railway) to their facility at Washwood Heath for evaluation for a possible mainline return but work has not been proceeded with. 56114 was stripped of usable parts and dispatched for scrapping during March 2012 and was cut up immediately after arrival at EMR Kingsbury. BARS 56091 returned to service in April 2013 but has since been sidelined due to power unit issues. 56103 was returned to service with BARS during July 2014. 56301 remains under long-term hire to BARS. In November 2017 all six remaining locomotives (56091, 103, 128, 303, 311, 312) were put up for sale. Only 56303 was operational.

==== UK Rail Leasing ====
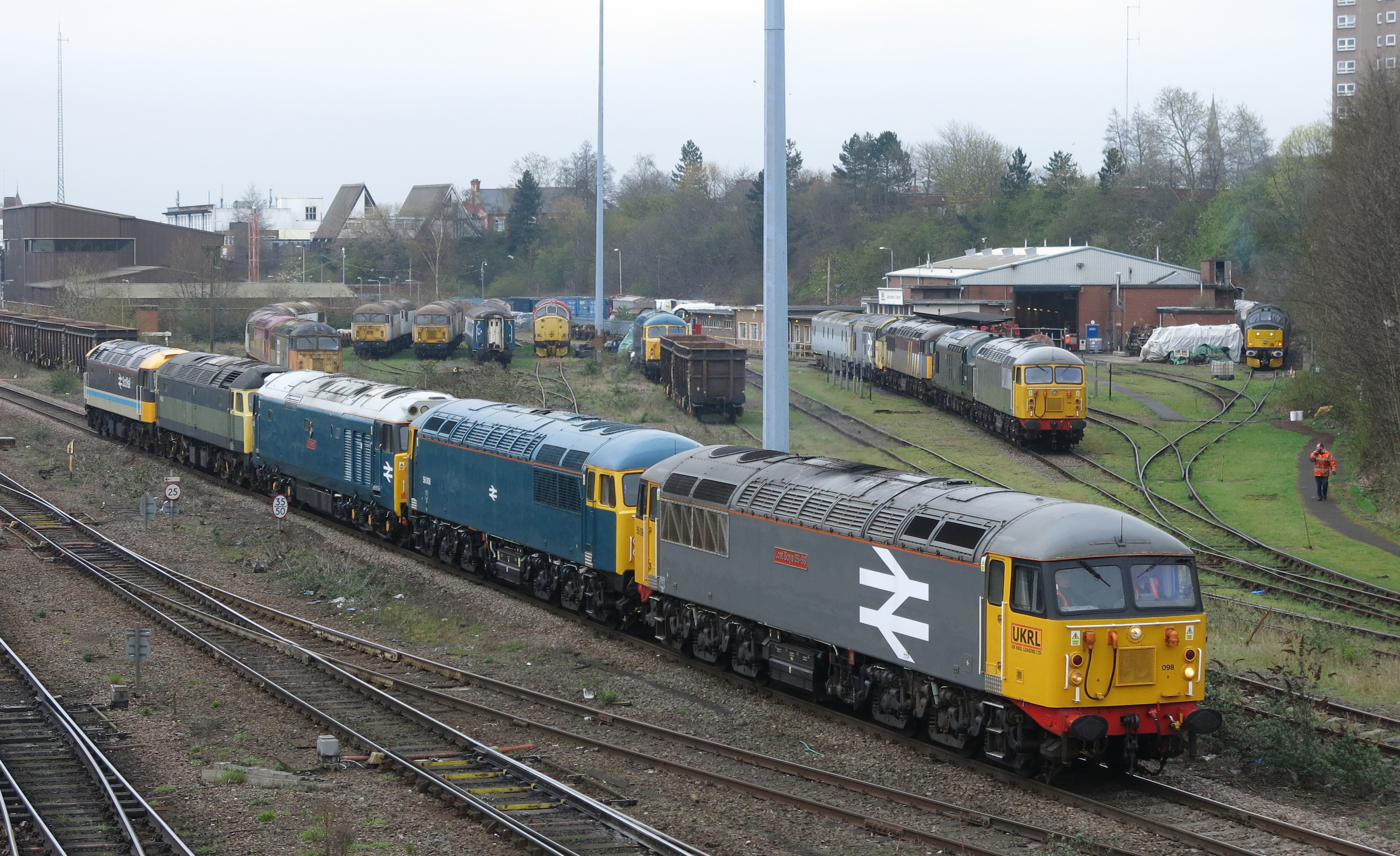
A convoy of diesel locomotives led by two Class 56s at UK Rail Leasing base at Leicester, 2016

Leicester-based UK Rail Leasing (UKRL) operates Class 56's on a spot-hire basis. Within two months of the company's founding in September 2013, a fleet of 16 former DB Schenker Class 56 and two Class 37/9 diesel locomotives had been purchased. In November 2014, UKRL's first locomotive (56081) was certified for main line use and hired to Freightliner. By November 2015, a further two (56098 and 56104) had been certified for main line use.

During mid-2014, UKRL were reportedly considering upgrading a Class 56 with new engines and electronics; the proposed arrangement involved two 1,900 hp engines for a combined output of 3,800 hp. However, this was emphasised to be "blue sky thinking" and not likely to happen soon. Further information was published two years later. By then, three different options were being considered; these were: two main engines, a single main engine, or a single main engine plus an auxiliary engine. It is expected that a re-engined Class 56 would cost around £1.8 million, compared to £3 million for a new locomotive.

In December 2017, two further locomotives (56311, 312) were acquired from BARS/DCR. However, in 2018, 16 locomotives, the majority of their fleet, were sold to GB Railfreight.

=== Current operators ===
==== Colas Rail ====
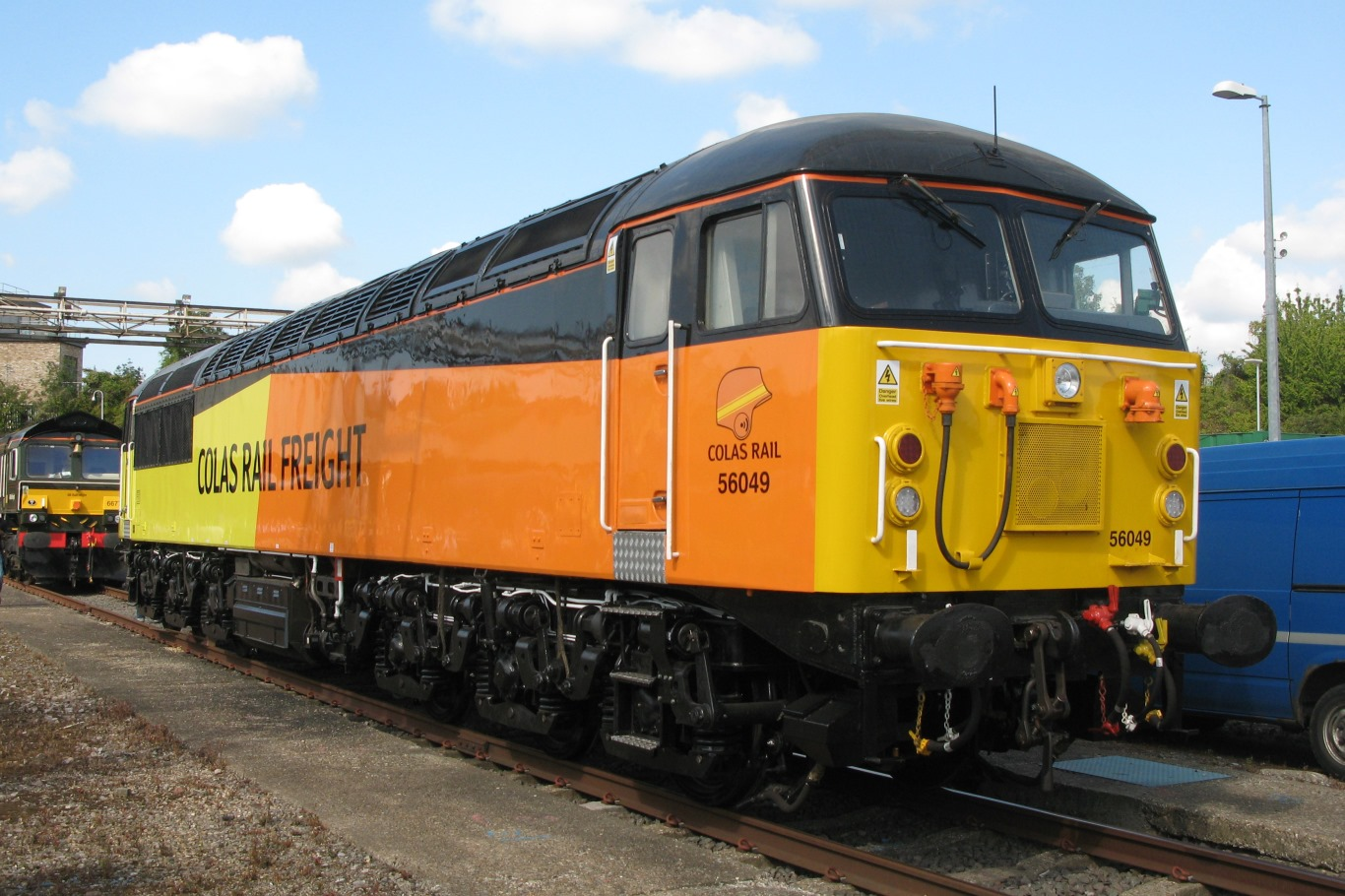
56049 on display at Old Oak Common Depot open day in 2017.

In late 2008, Colas Rail commenced operating steel trains from Immingham to Washwood Heath with Class 56s hired from Hanson Traction. In 2012, Colas purchased four Class 56s. By January 2014, Colas had purchased 11 of the type. As of 2020, Colas Rail Freight operates 56049, 051, 078, 087, 090, 094, 096, 105, 113 and 302 on a rotating basis on all its freight movements.

==== GB Railfreight ====
In June 2018, GB Railfreight acquired 16 of the Class 56 locomotives owned by UK Rail Leasing, together with various parts. The locomotives were previously owned by EWS and subsequently hired to Fertis, for high speed rail construction trains in France, before returning to the UK and were later acquired by UK Rail Leasing in 2014 for spot hire. Only 56081, 098 and 104 had been made operational by UKRL, with the majority stored at Leicester Carriage Sidings. Locomotive (56128) ex DCR/BARS was acquired from CF Booth (scrapyard) and collected from there by GBRF directly. 56009, 031, 032, 037, 069, 311 subsequently moved to EMD Longport for re-engineering in July 2018.

In April 2019, GB Railfreight announced that it had awarded Progress Rail a contract to re-power the 16 locomotives that it bought from UK Rail Leasing. The locomotives will have their existing engines replaced by EMD 12-710 series engines, and will receive updated electronic controls. The work is being undertaken at Progress Rail's Longport site with the first completed in 2021. The rebuilt locomotives are to be redesignated as Class 69.

==== DCRail ====
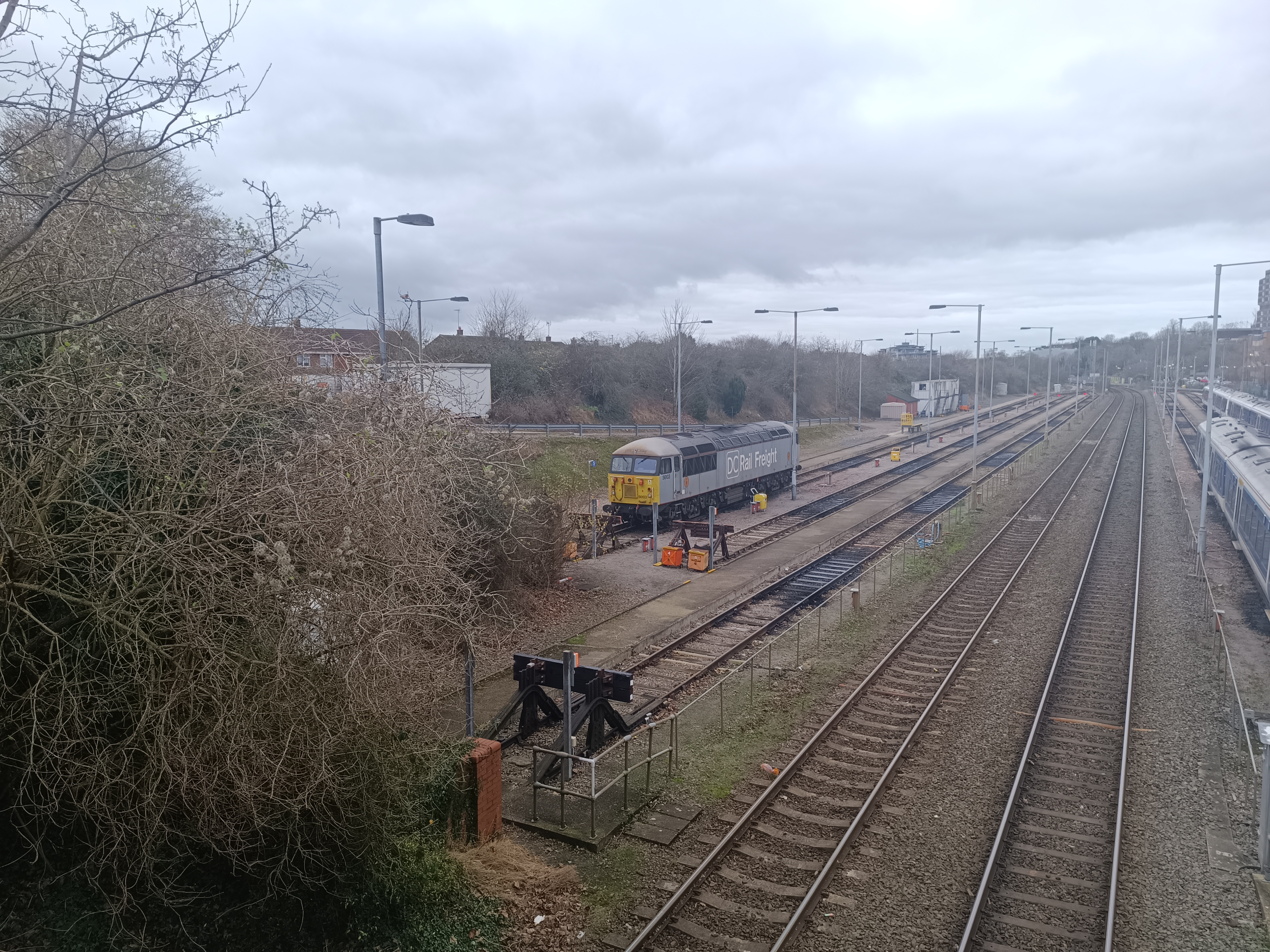
DC Rail Freight 56103 parked in a siding near Aylesbury station, Buckinghamshire, 2024

In mid 2017, Devon & Cornwall Railways was bought by the waste contracting firm Cappagh Group. Branded as DCRail, the company acquired ex-Fertis locomotives 56103 and 56091 from its former parent BARS. Both locomotives are now in traffic.. In March 2025, the Class 56 Group announced that DC Rail had bought 56301 out of preservation for mainline use.

DCRail are also current owners of the Willesden 'F' Sidings in London, just south of Wembley. Contracts out of the yard include loaded Spoil trains to Calvert land fill in Buckinghamshire. With more flows expected in the coming months.

==== Floyd Zrt. (Hungary) ====
Floyd Zrt. acquired three locomotives for use in Hungary. 56101 & 115 for operations in 2012 and 56117 as a spares donor in 2013. 56115 suffered damage to one cab after hitting a lorry on a level crossing. Subsequently, it was repaired using a cab supplied by UKRL from 56106 in 2017 and 56117 was also brought into use.

==== Ghana Railway Development Authority ====
In July 2026, two Class 56s (56094 and 56302) were known to be operating in Ghana, operating between Tema and Mpakadan (a port at Lake Volta), in the southeast of the country.

== Preservation ==
Although multiple members of the class have been purchased for preservation, most have re-entered mainline service. There is presently only one operational class 56 that is preserved.

| Number | Name | Livery | Location | Notes |
|---|---|---|---|---|
| 56006 | - | BR Blue | East Lancashire Railway | Owned by Class 56 Group |
| 56303 | - | DCR Rail | East Lancashire Railway | Owned by Class 56 Group. Spares donor for 56006 |

== Accidents and incidents ==
- On 14 June 1988, locomotive No. 56 062 was hauling a freight train that overran signals and was derailed at Copyhold Junction, West Sussex. Recovery of the locomotive was a protracted affair. On 18 August, the locomotive was returned to an upright position. Its engine and alternator unit were removed on 4 September. The body was lifted from the bogies on 2 October. All were transported to Doncaster Works where the locomotive was rebuilt.
- In June 1991, 56002 derailed whilst powering an MGR service at Caverswall, Blythe Bridge, Staffordshire. The locomotive remained on site awaiting recovery for around a month with one cab crushed by its MGR wagons. The 1977 built locomotive was withdrawn 8 May 1992 after only 15 years service and scrapped two years later at Doncaster MPD in March 1994, the second of the fleet to be withdrawn.

== Model railways ==
=== OO gauge ===
Mainline Railways introduced OO gauge Class 56s in 1983; one in BR large logo livery and 56079 in BR blue. It was later re-issued by Dapol Model Railways in their range. Following the sale by Dapol of their tooling to Hornby, in 1998 Hornby Railways launched its first version of the BR Class 56 in OO gauge, using the former Mainline Railways tooling. In late 2007, Hornby introduced a completely new, re-tooled range of BR Class 56 models in OO gauge, with examples in BR blue and Railfreight grey liveries. A couple of months later in early 2008, Hornby added a third model in the form of 56128 Burton Power Station, in Railfreight Coal Sector livery. In 2021, Cavalex announced that the Class 56 would be its first powered locomotive. The first batch arrived in early 2024 with a selection of 14 different identities. These covered the four different designs of the class. A second batch was confirmed in June 2024, which included new livery and body style combinations, and small amendments to the models.

=== N gauge and O gauge ===
The Class 56 has also been manufactured in N gauge by Graham Farish and Dapol. The original Graham Farish tooling, which dated from 1993, was updated in 2003. Dapol introduced its N gauge class 56 in 2012, with the manufacturer announcing in 2023 that re-tooling would include an all-new bodyshell to allow for accurate representation of the original Romanian and later UK-built locomotives. The Class 56 was also produced in O gauge by Heljan.
