= British Rail Class 69 =

Class of diesel train locomotive

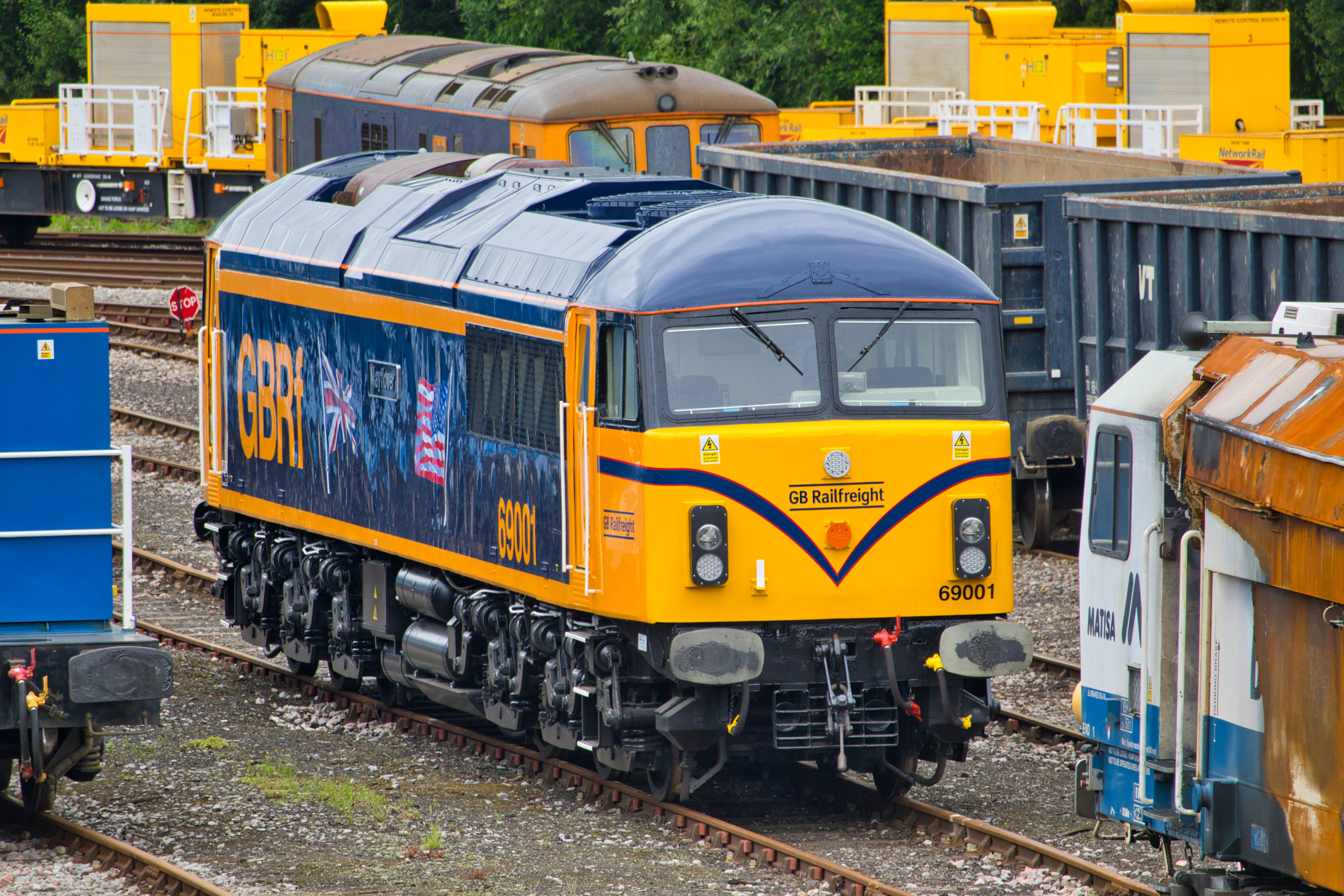
- The first-built Class 69 locomotive at Tonbridge West Yard
Type and origin
- Power type: Diesel-electric
- Builder: Electroputere, Romania; BREL Doncaster Works; BREL Crewe Works
- Build date: 1976–1984 (as Class 56)
- Rebuilder: Progress Rail, Longport
- Rebuild date: 2020–2025
- Number rebuilt: 16 (ordered)
Specifications
- Configuration
  - UIC: Co′Co′
  - Commonwealth: Co-Co
- Gauge: 1,435 mm (4 ft 8 1/2 in) standard gauge
- Wheel diameter: 1,143 mm (3 ft 9 in)
- Minimum curve: 80 m (262 ft 6 in)
- Wheelbase: 14.580 m (47 ft 10 in)
  - Axle spacing (Asymmetrical): Axles 1–2 and 5–6: 1.950 m (6 ft 4.8 in); Axles 2–3 and 4–5: 2.150 m (7 ft 0.6 in)
  - Bogie: 4.100 m (13 ft 5.4 in)
- Pivot centres: 14.480 m (47 ft 6.1 in)
- Length: 19.355 m (63 ft 6 in) (over buffers)
- Width: 2.792 m (9 ft 2 in)
- Height: 3.960 m (13 ft 0 in)
- Fuel type: Diesel
- Fuel capacity: 5,200 litres (1,140 imp gal; 1,370 US gal)
- Prime mover: EMD 12N-710G3B-T2
- Engine type: Two-stroke V12 diesel
- Aspiration: Turbocharged
- Displacement: 139.6 L (8,520 in^{3})
- MU working: AAR system (Note: Also used by Classes 59, 66, 67, 68 (numbers 68008–68015 only), 70, and 73/9.)
- Train heating: None
- Train brakes: Air; (Davies and Metcalfe E70)
- Safety systems: AWS; TPWS
Performance figures
- Maximum speed: 80 mph (130 km/h)
- Power output: 2,390 kW (3,200 bhp)
Career
- Operators: GB Railfreight
- Numbers: 69001–69016
- Axle load class: Route Availability 7
- Current owner: Progress Rail

The British Rail Class 69 is a class of diesel locomotives which are converted from Class 56 locomotives. The conversion work is performed by Progress Rail at their workshop in Longport.

The Class 69 was developed to fulfil the needs of the rail freight operator GB Railfreight (GBRf), which was unable to purchase additional Class 66 diesel locomotives yet sought more capacity in a similar performance band. The conversion of surplus Class 56s, which were available in sufficient quantity and in good enough condition to make the class a good candidate for the project, proved to be a desirable option, being more affordable than new build locomotives while achieving similar performance to the Class 66 post-conversion. Many of the new systems installed are similar, or identical, to those present on the Class 66, including its EMD 710 powerplant and associated control systems; this was a deliberate choice in order to maximise the performance similarities. Retained elements were refurbished to an as-new condition.

== History ==
=== Background ===
During 2000, the rail freight haulage company GB Railfreight (GBRf) obtained its first Class 66 diesel locomotive; determining the type's performance to be ideal to its purposes, procured it in large numbers; by 2021, GBRf's fleet of roughly 130 locomotives was dominated by 99 Class 66s. According to Bob Tiller, GBRf's Engineering Strategy Director, while the Class 66 was affordable and considerably more reliable than its British-built counterparts, the locomotive was effectively unobtainable by the late 2010s due to its non-compliance with the latest National Technical Specification Notices. Thus, while the company sought to continue its growth, its preferred option had become unavailable other than by acquiring second-hand examples.

During the 2010s, it was observed that there were no in-production diesel locomotives available at the time that could deliver the desired performance while also fitting within the UK's restrictive loading gauge. Furthermore, designing one would necessitate the placing of a large and costly order that came with some risk, as a suitably compliant engine might not even fit the UK gauge at all, while an active decarbonisation strategy that sought to eliminate all diesel trains from the railway by 2040 would thus limit its lifespan considerably. Instead, GBRf examined the prospects for the conversion of existing rolling stock, akin to the reengining of the Class 47 into the Class 57. Class 56, Class 58, and Class 60 freight locomotives were all studied; the Class 58 was quickly dismissed due to few examples remaining, while the Class 60s were mostly owned by other companies. The more numerous Class 56 thus became the preferred option.

The company sought out available Class 56s in the hands of other companies. Priority was given to those locomotives that were in good enough condition to still be moved by rail, necessitating the bogies, suspension, wheelsets, and brake equipment being functional. However, little value was placed on items such as its diesel engine or most of the control systems, which were to be replaced with systems similar, or identical, to those installed on the Class 66. During June 2018, GBRf purchased 16 Class 56 locomotives from UK Rail Leasing, many of which had been out of use for a number of years. Additionally, 56106 was acquired in an incomplete state as a source of spares and 56128 from metal recycler CF Booth.

=== Project launch ===
In April 2019, GBRf announced that the locomotives would be rebuilt as Class 69s by Progress Rail at its Longport facility. The rebuild scheme involves the replacement of the original Ruston-Paxman RK3 engine with the EMD 710 powerplant, while newer electronic control systems based on those present on the Class 66 were also installed. Initial work involved the stripping of all removable parts from each locomotive and the overhauling of all those to be retained to an as-new condition. Body repairs, usually to address corrosion, were then performed along with the replacement of all pipework. The body was then subject to various alterations to accommodate the revised air intakes, exhaust (of both the engine itself and the cooler group) and the modified external lighting clusters that conform to contemporary standards. The installation of the new equipment then proceeded.

GBRF stated that the complete rebuild and re-engine of each locomotive is considerably cheaper than purchasing and importing new locomotives from abroad. During February 2021, 69001 underwent trials on the Severn Valley Railway prior to its arrival at Eastleigh Works for painting four months later. On 26 May 2021, authorisation was received from the Office of Rail and Road, enabling the first locomotive to go into service two months later. The initial contract was for ten units, with an option for six more. By January 2023, seven locomotives had reportedly been rebuilt.

The full fleet of seven locomotives was temporarily withdrawn from service in late January 2023 in order to "investigate faults being reported by drivers". GBRf stated that they had "become aware of issues" with the locomotives, and that the period of withdrawal – expected to last for eight weeks – would be used to implement improvements.

== Design ==
The British Rail Class 69 is a rebuild of the earlier Class 56; while the external appearance and many elements were retained, much of the internal systems were replaced with those sourced from the Class 66. It was necessary to maintain the gauge, braking characteristics, and dynamics of the original locomotive in order to avoid invoking the technical and certification requirements involved in the production of a new-build locomotive; limited certification was required, which was provided by TÜV Rheinland. The original underframe, bogies, traction motors and brake system were all retained and subject to overhauls. According to GBRf, elements of the donor locomotives, such as the bodies, wheelsets, bogie frames and suspension, traction motors, and fuel tanks were usually in good condition already or were easy to restore.

The most prominent alteration of the rebuild is the adoption of the new engine, the 12 cylinder EMD 12N-710G3B-T2; it is identical to the powerplants installed on some of the later-built Class 66 locomotives (numbers 66752–66779). Capable of producing just under 2,400 kilowatts (3,200 hp), the engine is compliant with EU Stage IIIa off-road emissions standards. Due to the tight space constraints, the engine is bolted directly to the frame without any anti-vibration mounts; instead, the engine is tuned post-installation to avoid resonant vibrations. The fuel capacity is 5,200 litres (1,140 imp gal; 1,370 US gal) while the route availability remains at 7.

Driver's desk and control stand, after rebuild.

The driver's cabs have also been heavily modernised, the changes include the installation of new measures to reduce the levels of both noise and vibration that the occupants are exposed to. Insulation has been fitted along with additional heater and fan units to provide greater comfort to the driver. To the right of the driver's position is the EMD power control pedestal, while the controls for the multiple braking systems have been installed to their left. Safety equipment includes the latest Mark IV version of the Train Protection & Warning System (TPWS) and the Automatic Warning System (AWS), while space has also been provisioned for the potential future installation of ETCS apparatus.

Throughout the locomotive, various new components and subsystems were installed, such as the compressors, blower motors, and electronic cubicles. The original electronic control system was somewhat basic, frequently being the cause of wheel spins and reduced tractive effort across all three axles on one of the bogies; in its place is the EMD EM2000 control and EMD CP5 drive systems, capable of independently monitoring the speed and load of each axle to maximise available adhesion, reducing the tendency for axle unloading and thus improving the effective tractive effort of the locomotive. The AAR multiple-working system has been installed.

== Fleet details ==
Class	Operator	Qty.	Year converted	Numbers	Notes
69	GB Railfreight	16	2020–present	69001–69016	Converted from Class 56 locomotives

Details of the 16 locomotives are:

Number	Rebuilt from	Original manufacturer	Notes
69001	56031	BREL Doncaster	Painted in a special variant of GBRf's livery featuring the Union Flag and the flag of the United States, along with DMU-style speed whiskers, named Mayflower.
69002	56311	BREL Doncaster	Liveried in BR 'large logo' blue, named Bob Tiller CM&EE.
69003	56018	Electroputere	GBRf livery with DMU-style speed whiskers, named The Railway Observer.
69004	56069	BREL Doncaster	Railway Technical Centre blue and red livery, RIDC Melton.
69005	56007	Electroputere	Liveried in BR green with white bands and half-height yellow warning ends, named Eastleigh.
69006	56128	BREL Crewe	GBRf livery with DMU-style speed whiskers, Pathfinder Railtours.
69007	56037	BREL Doncaster	BR Blue livery with GB Railfreight logos, named Richard Trevithick.
69008	56038	BREL Doncaster	GBRf livery with DMU-style speed whiskers, named Richard Howe.
69009	56060	BREL Doncaster	Maroon with white cabs, as Western Region Class 52, named Western Consort.
69010	56065	BREL Doncaster	GBRf livery with DMU-style speed whiskers, named "North Norfolk Railway 1975-2025 The Poppy Line"
69011	56032	BREL Doncaster	GBRf livery with DMU-style speed whiskers.
69012	56077	BREL Doncaster	Two tone BR green in the style of Brush prototype D0280 (Class 53 no. 1200) Falcon, named Falcon 2.
69013	56312	Electroputere	Painted in a special livery promoting Andy's Man Club, a UK-based men's mental health charity
69014	56104	BREL Doncaster	Electro-Motive Diesels (EMD) demonstrator livery of gold and black, named EMD Longport.
69015	56009	Electroputere	BR Railfreight grey with red stripe and DMU-style speed whiskers.
69016	56097	BREL Doncaster	Police livery (Blue and white with high visibility yellow chequers around solebar)

European Vehicle Numbers for the fleet are devised by prefixing the domestic locomotive number with type code 92, country code 70, and two leading zeroes; "927000...".
