= RMS Locotec =

- Industry: Railways
- Founded: April 1992
- Founder: John Hummel
- Headquarters: Wolsingham, England
- Area served: United Kingdom
- Services: Rolling stock hire
- Website: www.rmslocotec.com

RMS Locotec is a railway company based in Wolsingham, England. It has specialised in industrial railway management, infrastructure maintenance, and rolling stock leasing; one major customer was its former sister company and rail freight operator DCRail.

RMS Locotec was founded in April 1992, initially operating second-hand 0-4-0 and Class 08 0-6-0 shunter locomotives. During 2008, it was purchased by British American Railway Services. Throughout much of the 2010s, RMS Locotec leased six Class 31 and six Class 56 locomotives to DCRail. In June 2020, RMS Locotec was sold to the consortium Proviso Holdings.

== History ==
RMS Locotec was established by John Hummel in April 1992. It was initially based in Dewsbury and operated a handful of second-hand 0-4-0 and Class 08 0-6-0 shunter locomotives. RMS Locotec secured its first contract with the British cement production firm Blue Circle Industries, further work was also won from Imperial Chemical Industries (ICI) and the oil company Mobil. During 2008, the business was purchased, along with several other British railway concerns, by British American Railway Services (BARS), a subsidiary of the American railway company Iowa Pacific Holdings (IPH).

RMS Locotec has been involved in track maintenance work, such as on behalf of the Manx Electric Railway; these activities include design, procurement, installation, repair, inspection, and technical consultancy. It is also involved in the short-term and long-term leasing of rolling stock, including the provision of technical support for its operation. Several Class 08s owned by RMS Locotec have been leased to various depots across the British Isles for the shunting of rolling stock, often performing hundreds of such operations in a single night.

Throughout much of the 2010s, RMS Locotec leased 12 diesel locomotives, comprising six Class 31 (31190, 31452, 31454, 31468, 31601, and 31602) and six Class 56 (56091, 56103, 56128, 56303, 56311, and 56312), to sister company and rail freight operator DCRail. During January 2018, it announced that it was putting all of these locomotives up for sale, reportedly as a consequence of the pending closure of Washwood Heath depot to make room for High Speed 2 construction works. During the sales process, both 56091 and 56103 were obtained by DCRail to facility its continued operations, while the remainder of RMS Locotec's Class 56s were sold to the spot-hire company UK Rail Leasing. Other locomotives were also sold to other organisations, including heritage railways.

Shortly following BARS entering into administration, various subsidiaries of the company were put up for sale, including RMS Locotec. During June 2020, a deal was reached for its sale to the consortium Proviso Holdings, which also operated Eastern Rail Services, along with 20 Class 08 locomotives; the move was hauled as bolstering RMS Locotec's core shunter hire business.
