= DCRail =

British freight train operator

- British Rail Class 60 at Newport in 2022
- Founded: November 2003
- Headquarters: Wimbledon, United Kingdom
- Area served: Europe
- Services: Freight operating company
- Website: Official website

DCRail (DCR), legally named Devon & Cornwall Railways Limited, is a British train operator. It has been active as a freight operating company since May 2011. It is a subsidiary of the Cappagh Group.

DCR was founded in November 2003, and was as subsidiary of the British American Railway Services (BARS). Early activities were focused on a proposed passenger service between Okehampton and Exeter St Davids; at one point this was months away from launching in May 2010, but was eventually cancelled. In May 2011, DCR commenced operating its first freight services. It has since opted to focus on the rail freight sector and develop a larger footprint. In addition to leased rolling stock, it acquired a handful of Class 56 diesel locomotives with which to run its services.

During November 2017, BARS sold DCR to the Cappagh Group. Since then, it has functioned as the rail freight operating arm of Cappagh, with its operations increasingly centred around the movement of aggregates, and supporting major construction projects. To this end, additional new-build rolling stock has been acquired and a series of new urban depots have been established in the Midlands, London, and the South East.

== History ==
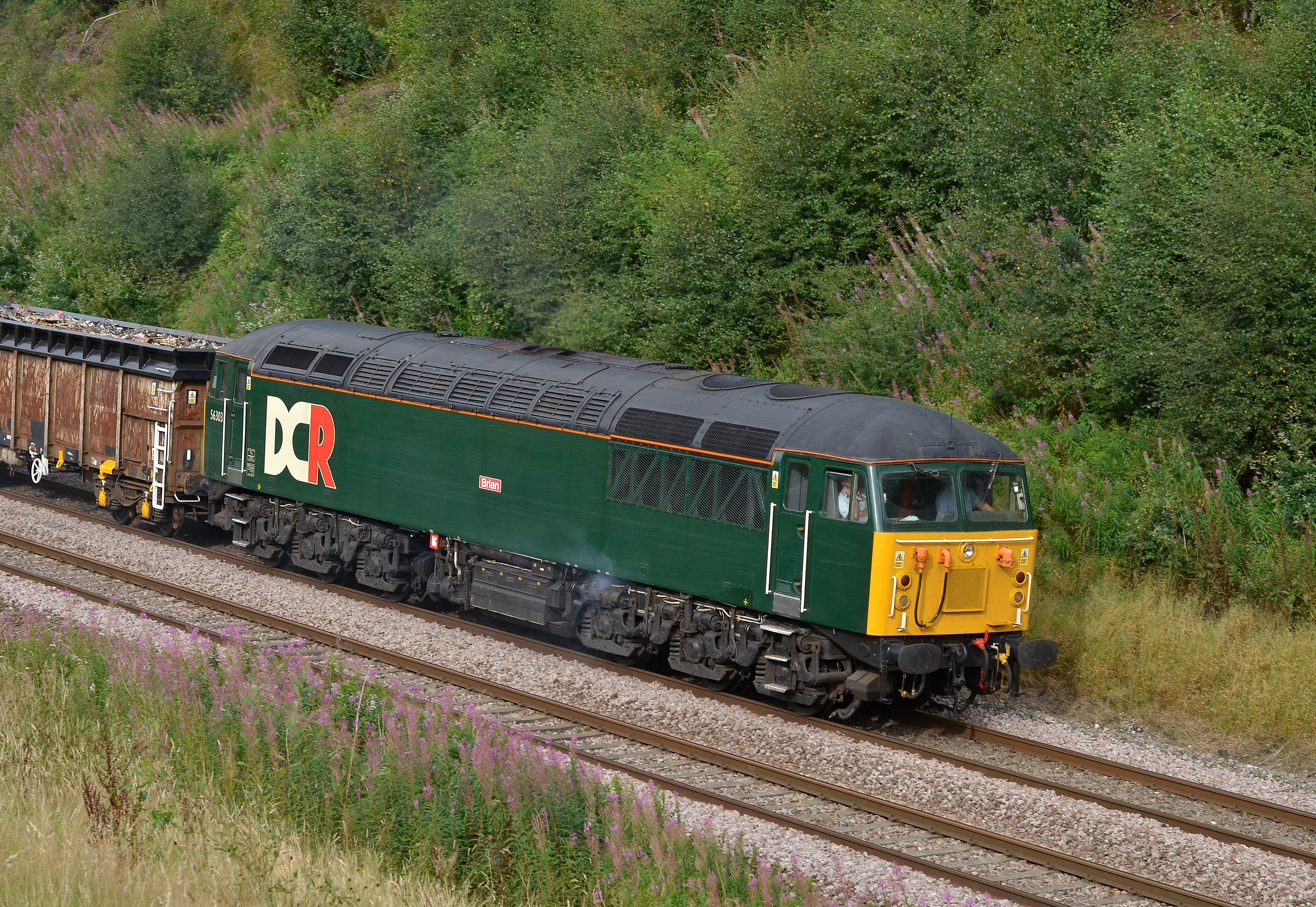
56303 in August 2012, in DCR livery based on GWR green

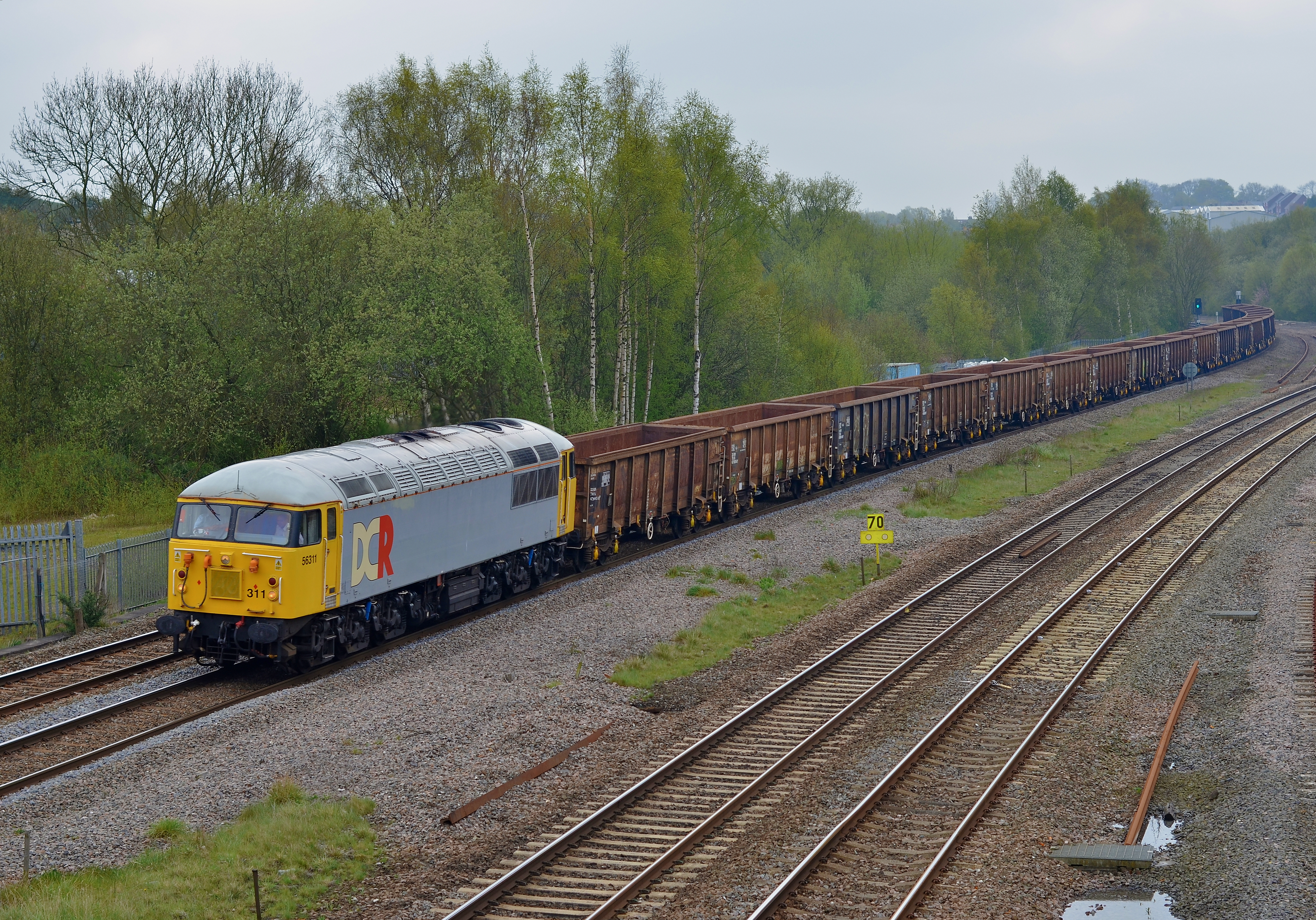
56311 in May 2012, in DCR grey livery

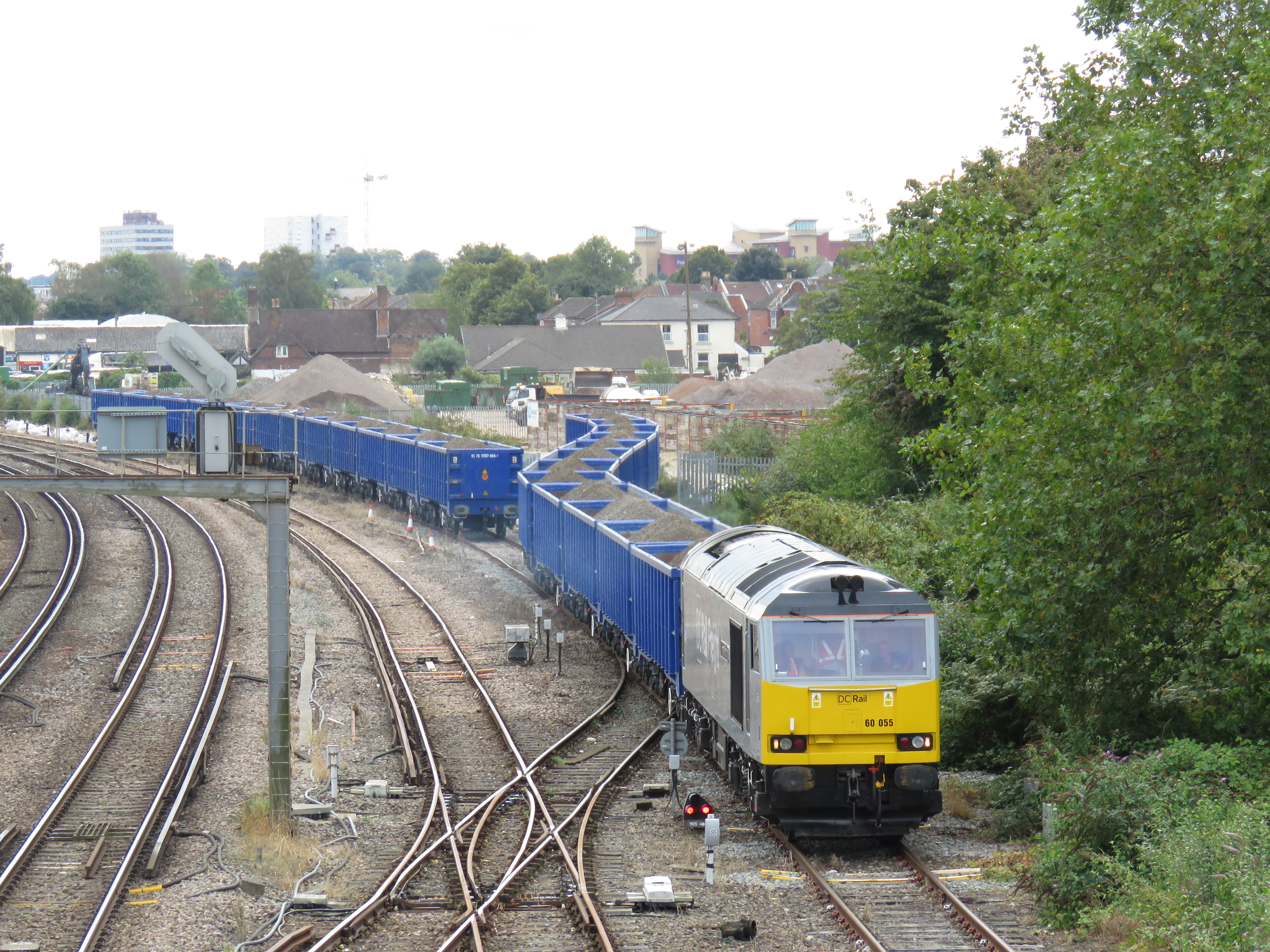
60055 in September 2020, in DCR grey livery

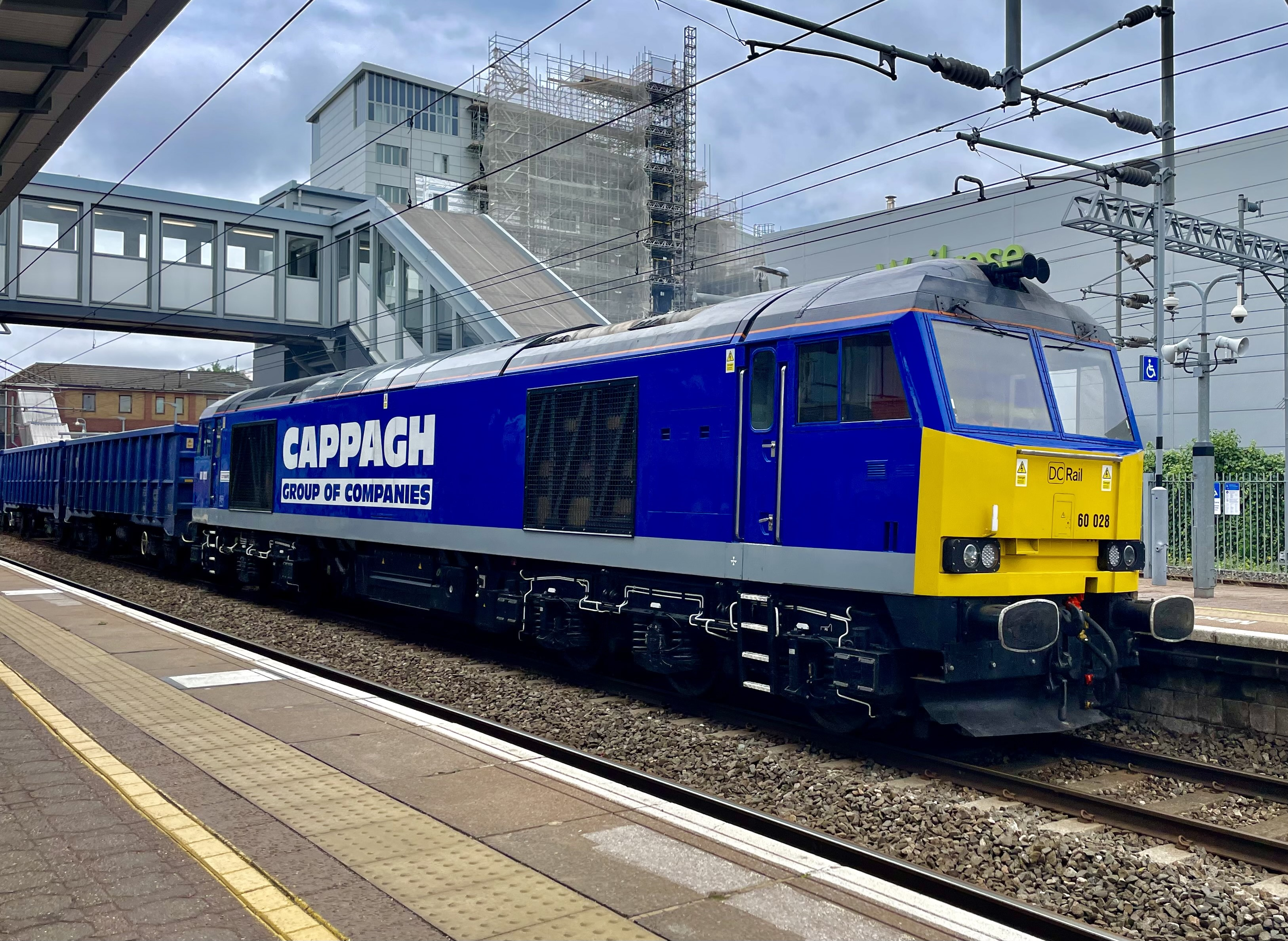
60028 in July 2024, in full Cappagh blue livery

The company's origins can be traced back to the American railway company Iowa Pacific Holdings (IPH); during the 2000s, it acquired several railway companies active in the United Kingdom, such as its purchase of both the Dartmoor Railway and Weardale Railway during 2008. IPH established the British American Railway Services (BARS) to oversee its operations in this region. DCRail (DCR) was established as a limited company during November 2003, and was a wholly owned subsidiary of BARS.

Initial plans for DCR centred around a proposed passenger service between Okehampton and Exeter St Davids, the last such services on the route having been axed by British Rail during 1972. For this purpose, parent company BARS purchased a rake of Mark 2 carriages and several Driving Brake Standard Opens. Infrastructure owner Network Rail worked closely with DCR on their proposals and spoke positively of the initiative. During March 2010, it was publicly stated by the company that it was scheduled to commence services on 23 May 2010, and would run six return journeys per day on every day of the week. However, this date would pass without any such service being run, reportedly due to delays in obtaining final approval from the Office of Rail Regulation, along with the necessary train operator's licence and safety certification.

During October 2010, it was announced that BARS had acquired Hanson Traction along with its fleet of six locomotives. During December 2010, the Office of Rail Regulation granted DCR a European freight operators' licence. Accordingly, in May 2011, DCR commenced operating its first freight services. By 2013, the company had decided to focus on its freight operations, particularly on the pursuit of new contracts, such as the hauling of construction trains.

During November 2017, DCR was sold by BARS to a new owner, the construction and logistics specialist Cappagh Group, who have provided financial support to its new subsidiary. With this support, new urban rail terminals and rolling stock has been acquired; the first of the new terminals, in Wembley, was completed during 2020. Additional facilities in London, the Midlands, and the South East region are planned to support a new focus on intermodal opportunities. In January 2020, it was announced that 100 new box wagons, suitable for the movement of construction materials, would be provided by VTG Rail UK.

The need to recapitalise DCRail's rolling stock became clear when RMS Locotec, which owned 12 of the locomotives operated by DCRail, opted to put them up for sale during 2018, reportedly as a consequence of the pending closure of Washwood Heath depot to make room for High Speed 2 construction works. Around this time, the RMS Locotec fleet had comprised six Class 31 (31190, 31452, 31454, 31468, 31601, and 31602) and six Class 56 (56091, 56103, 56128, 56303, 56311, and 56312) diesel locomotives. During the sales process, both 56091 and 56103 were obtained by DCRail to facility its continued operations, while the remainder of RMS Locotec's Class 56s were sold to the spot-hire company UK Rail Leasing. DCR has stated its interest in acquiring newer traction, such as the Class 66 and Class 70 diesel locomotives.

During March 2019, DCR acquired four Class 60 diesel locomotives from the freight operator DB Cargo UK. Prior to entering service, these were overhauled by DB Cargo at Toton TMD; 60046 was the first to enter service with DCR in November 2019. Both 60028 and 60055 joined the fleet during December 2019, while 60029 arrived in 2020. 60028 was painted in an aquamarine blue and white livery, identical to Cappagh's road vehicles.

== Fleet summary ==
Class	Image	Type	Introduced	Fleet Size	Wheel Arr
Class 56		Diesel locomotive	1976-84	2	Co-Co
Class 60		Diesel locomotive	1989-1993	19	Co-Co
			Total	21	
