= Tema-Mpakadan Railway Line =

Gauge railroad from Tema to Mpakadan

Overview
- Status: Completed
- Termini: Tema Harbour; Akosombo Inland Harbour
- Stations: 6

Service
- Type: Heavy rail
- System: Ghana-Burkina Faso Interconnectivity Project

History
- Work began: 2018
- Opened: 2024-11-25
- Completed: 2024

Technical
- Line length: 96 km (60 mi)
- Track length: 96.7 km (60.1 mi)
- Number of tracks: Single
- Track gauge: 1,435 mm (4 ft 8 1/2 in)

The Tema-Mpakadan Railway Line is a 96.7 km standard gauge railroad constructed from the Tema to Mpakadan to facilitate the movement of goods along the Eastern corridor of Ghana.

The line is part of the 1000 km Ghana-Burkina Faso Interconnectivity Project which will connect Ouagadougou to the Port in Tema.

== History ==
=== Construction ===
Afcons Infrastructure began the construction of the Tema-Mpakadan Railway Line in 2018. The project was funded by the India Export-Import Bank at $440 million.

On February 27, 2024, Ghanaian President Nana Akufo-Addo announced that the line was at the final stage of completion.

=== Test Run ===
During the first test-run ahead of scheduled commencement of operations, newly acquired trains run into a truck parked over the railway track on 18 April 2024. The driver of the truck was sentenced to six months in prison.

=== Inauguration ===
On 25 November 2024, the line was inaugurated by President Nana Akuffo Addo, during a ceremony. But commercial operations were launched on 1 October 2025.

== Rolling Stock ==
In September 2022 GRC ordered two DMU from Pesa with option on an additional ten. The first DMU was completed in January 2024, and on February 2 of the same year, the vehicle was presented at the Bydgoszcz Główna station. Amongst the participants was the Secretary of State and the chief executive officer of the Ghana Railway Development Authority, Yaw Owusu.
