= Leicester Carriage Sidings =

Railway stabling point in Leicestershire, England

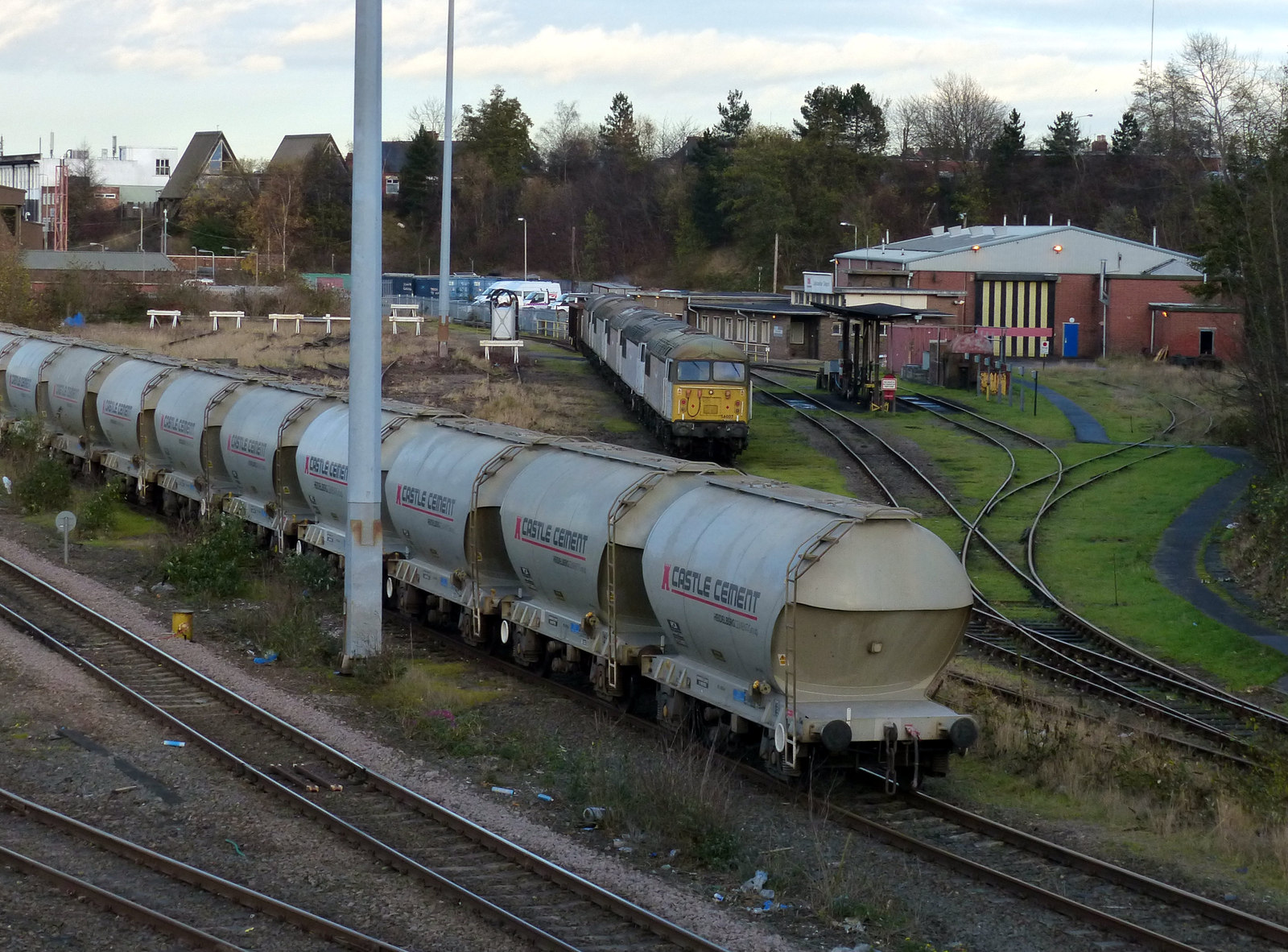
- Leicester Depot (2013)
- Interactive map of Leicester Carriage Sidings

Location
- Location: Beal Street, Leicester, Leicestershire, England
- Coordinates: 52.6346°N 1.1201°W
- OS grid: SK595045

Characteristics
- Owner: UK Rail Leasing
- Operator: UK Rail Leasing, Network Rail
- Depot code: LR (1973-present)
- Type: Diesel locomotives; diesel multiple units

History
- Opened: 1840
- Former depot code: 15C (1948-63); 15A (1963-73)

Leicester Carriage Sidings (also known as Leicester Traction Maintenance Depot (TMD)) is located in Leicester, Leicestershire, England, on the eastern side of the Midland Main Line to the north of Leicester station. It is owned by UK Rail Leasing (UKRL), which purchased the depot from DB Schenker in 2021.

== History ==
From 1959 to 2007, Classes 25, 27 and 45 diesel locomotives could be seen at the depot, along with Class 08 shunters. Around 1987, the depot had an allocation of Class 08 shunters and Classes 20, 31, 47, 56 and 58 diesel locomotives.

In 2023, UKRL announced that it would commence work on building a new £1.5m locomotive maintenance shed to be completed in 2024. This would increase its capacity in maintenance and servicing railway vehicles; it would maintain new classes of locomotives and provide UKRL significant extra capacity in Leicester to expand its maintenance business.

== Present ==
The site provides the following services:

- Routine light maintenance (level 1-4)
- Overnight servicing and train care
- Load bank test facilities
- Fuel point
- Two maintenance sheds
- Lifting capability
- Bogie swaps/wheelset changes
- New electric/diesel maintenance facility.

In addition, stabling is provided for CrossCountry's Class 170 Turbostar diesel multiple units and Network Rail's tamping machines.
