= Paris Moayedi =

Iranian entrepreneur (1938–2023)

Paris Moayedi (1938–2023) was the entrepreneur who expanded Jarvis plc from a small construction business into one of the UK's largest engineering contractors.

== Career ==
Born in Iran, brought up in the Mount Damavand area, and educated at Alborz High School in Tehran, Moayedi came to the UK in the 1958 and studied at Bradford University before becoming a site engineer at a business which was subsequently acquired by Amec. In 1983 he joined Walter Lawrence, a housebuilder, where he was appointed to establish a new division.

In 1994 he was appointed Chief Executive of Jarvis plc which he expanded from a small construction business into one of the UK's largest engineering contractors. He resigned in 2003 after Jarvis faced an investigation into its maintenance of the railway track following the seven fatalities in the rail crash at Potters Bar.

He was involved with Tetronics International, an international waste management company and Advanced Plasma Power, a small waste to energy business based in Swindon.

He lived in a 15th-century thatched house in Essex that used to belong to the singer Roger Whittaker. He died in April 2023.
