= Fastline =

Defunct rail freight company in England

Fastline Ltd

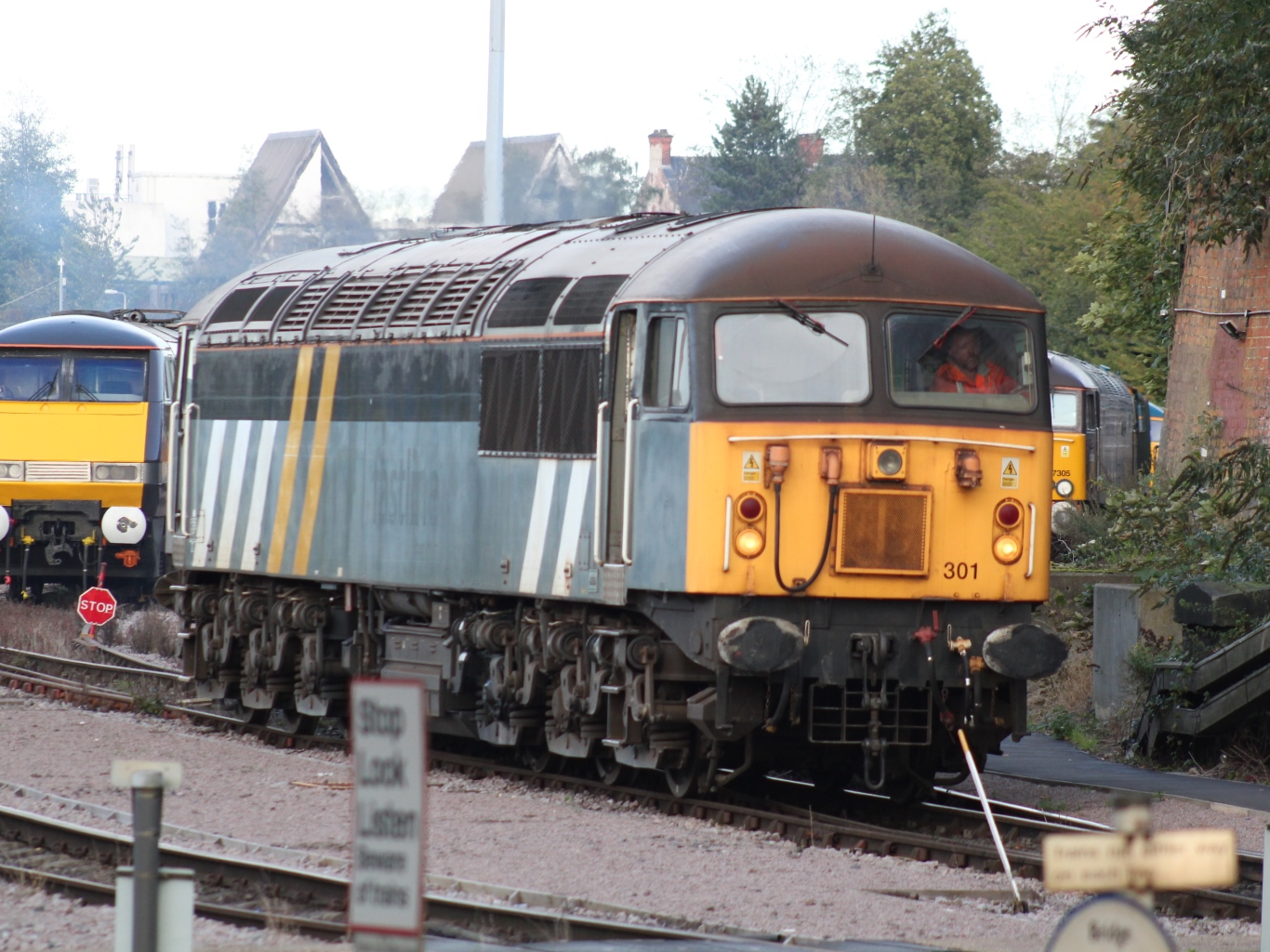
- 56301 at Leicester TMD
- Predecessor: Loadhaul; Mainline Freight; Rail Express Systems; Railfreight Distribution; Transrail Freight
- Founded: 1994
- Defunct: 2010
- Fate: Dissolved
- Headquarters: Doncaster, United Kingdom
- Area served: United Kingdom
- Services: Freight transportation Track maintenance equipment
- Parent: Jarvis
- Website: www.fastline-uk.com

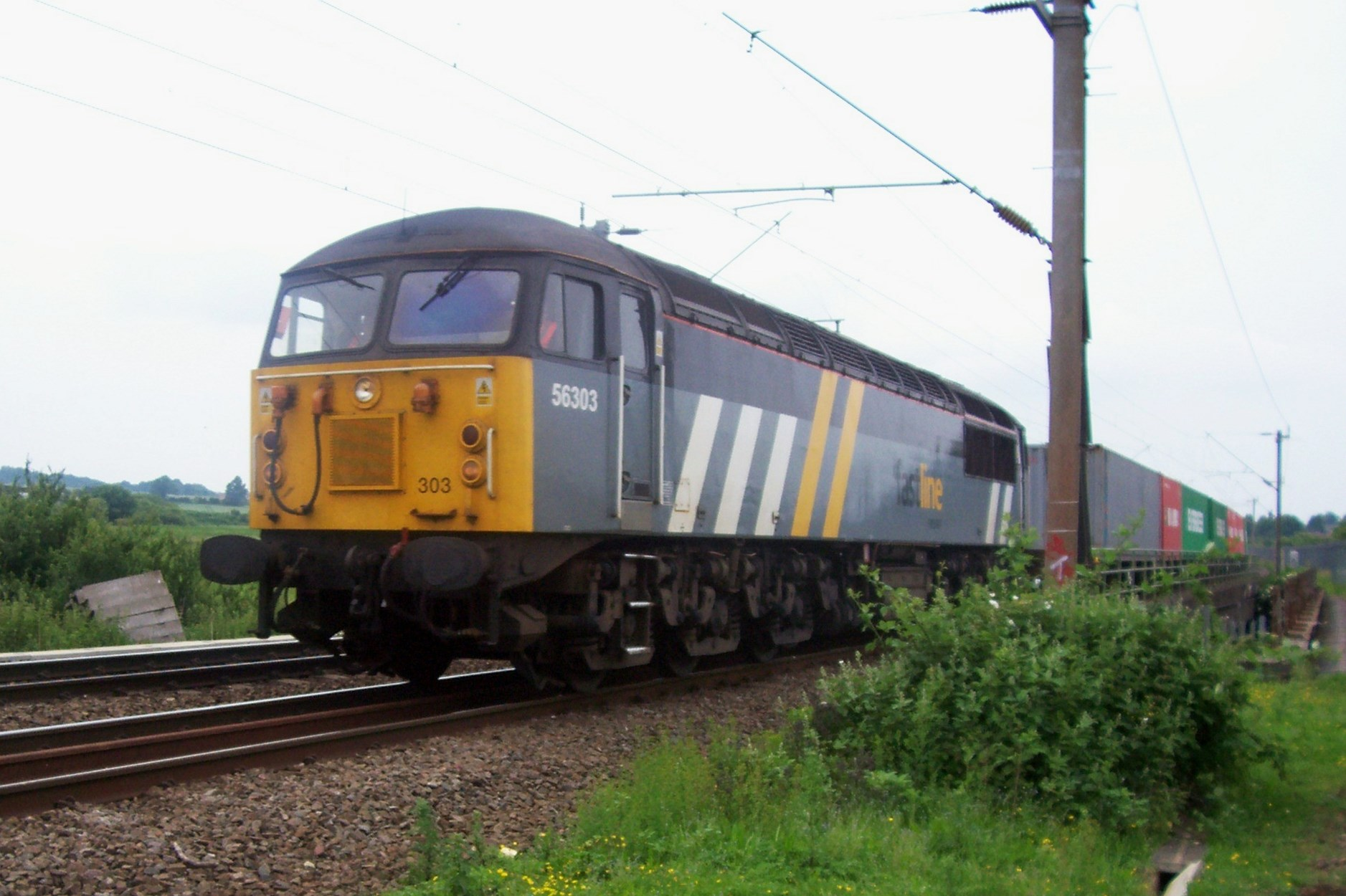
Fastline Class 56 56303 seen at Kingsheath operating an intermodal service in 2007.

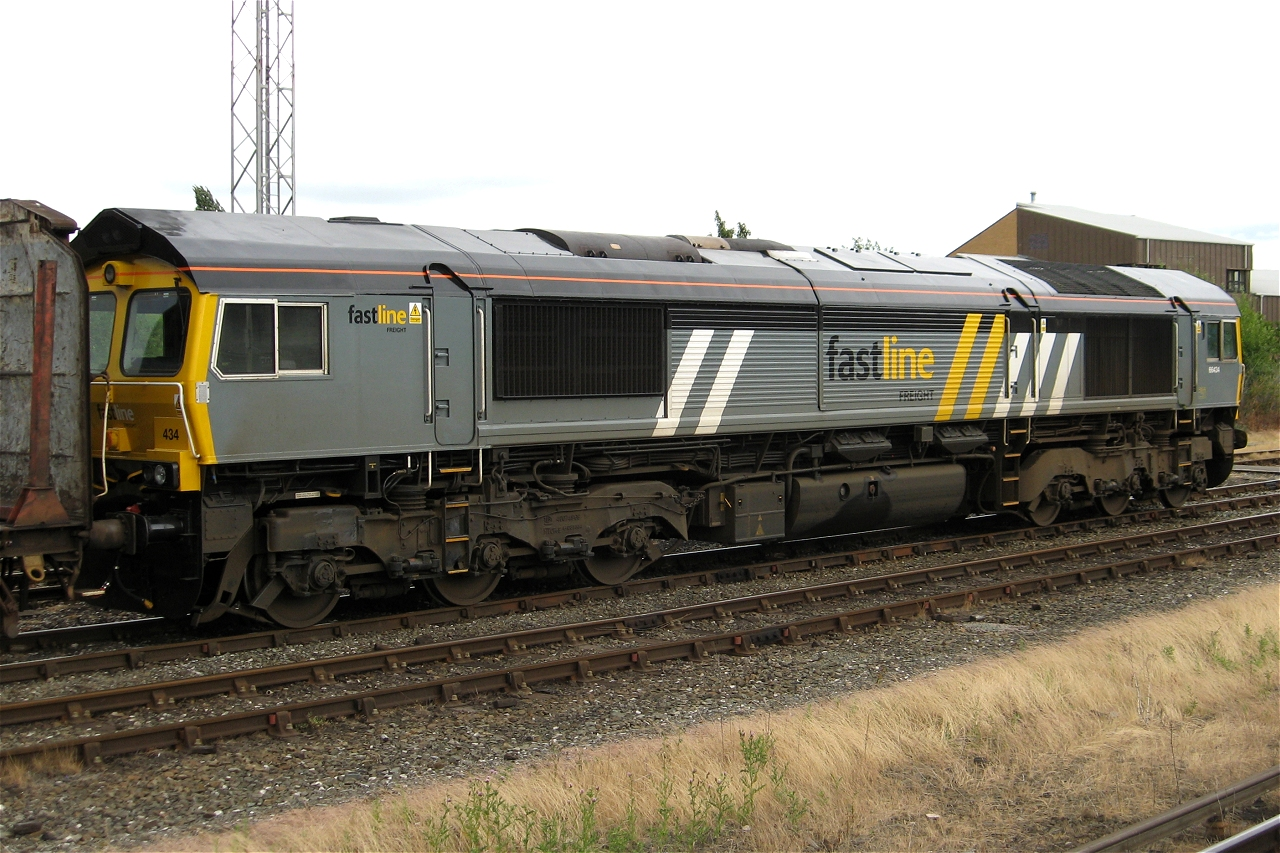
Fastline Class 66 66434 seen at Chester operating a Chirk Kronospan to Carlisle logging train for Colas Rail, 4 months after Fastline ceased trading.

Fastline was created by six railwaymen who undertook a successful management buyout (MBO) of Eastern Track Renewals from British Rail in 1996. In that year they bought Northern Track Renewals from British Rail, and undertook all the studies and examinations that resulted in their acquiring a Harsco Track Renewals Train, the first continuous-process track relaying system in the country. They also examined the possibility of acquiring their own diesel locomotives because of dissatisfaction with the service provided by others for engineering trains. The company was acquired by Jarvis, who later resurrected the Fastline name to create a railway freight operator. It operated a fleet of Class 56 and Class 66 locomotives. The class 56s cost £700,000 each to refurbish. A fourth and a fifth Class 56 (56311 & 56312) were hired in from Hanson Traction Ltd. Fastline's base was at Doncaster, Yorkshire. It ceased trading when Jarvis plc entered administration and subsequently ceased trading in late March 2010. The company is in administration with Deloitte.

== Operations ==
=== Container traffic ===
The company's main operation at first was 4O90, a container train to Thamesport on the Isle of Grain, which operated in the afternoon/evening, and returned in the early hours of the next morning, usually operating Class 56 locomotives. Since the end of Fastline's container traffic flows from Doncaster to the Isle of Grain, the class 56 locomotives were intended to be used on Fastline's coal flows.

=== Coal flows ===
They also ran several coal flows including from Hatfield to Ratcliffe-on-Soar Power Station, using Class 66s and a new build of coal hoppers. Coal flows run by Fastline included:

- Coal from Daw Mill to Ratcliffe-on-Soar Power Station
- Coal from Hatfield Colliery to Ratcliffe-on-Soar Power Station
- Coal from Daw Mill to Cottam Power Station
- Coal from Immingham to Ironbridge Power Station

== Fleet ==
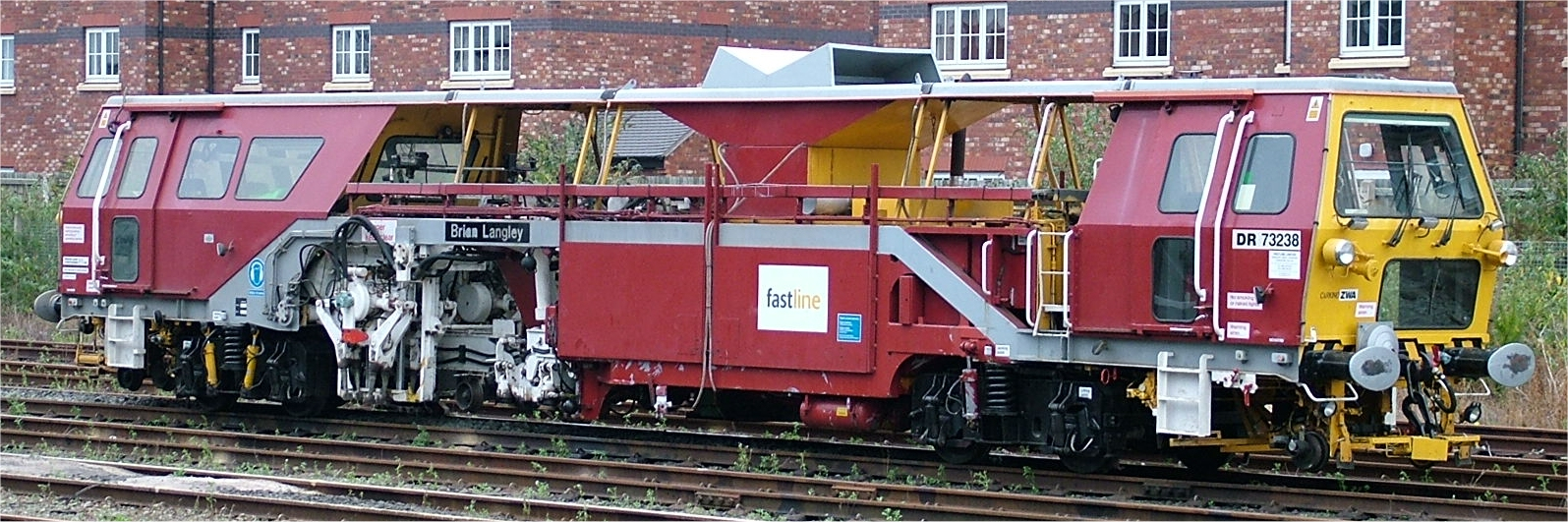
A track tamper in Jarvis PLC Fastline livery at Chester station.

Locomotive numbers 56301 and 56302 have been preserved and were moved to Barrow Hill Engine Shed in April 2011.
