= Jarvis plc =

British rail services company

- Type: Public
- Traded as: LSE: JRVS
- Industry: Rail
- Founded: 1846; 180 years ago
- Defunct: 2010; 16 years ago
- Headquarters: York, England
- Key people: Steven Norris, Chairman; Richard W. Entwistle, CEO; John P. O'Kane, Finance Director
- Revenue: £345.8 million (2009)
- Operating income: £7.7 million (2009)
- Net income: £(9.6) million (2009)
- Number of employees: 3,881 (2008)
- Website: jarvisplc.com

Jarvis plc (LSE: JRVS) was a British company that specialised in construction and civil engineering, with a focus on support services to the British railway industry during its latter years of operations.

It was established during 1846 as the Jarvis Construction Company. For much of the company's existence, its activities were focused on the construction sector. During the 1990s, senior management opted to heavily involve the firm in the recently privatised British railways, engaging in a spree of acquisitions to quickly expand Jarvis, building up substantial debts in the process. While primarily focused on railway maintenance services, Jarvis also undertook rail freight operations.

During the 21st century, the company took significant reputation damage from its involvement in the railway sector after multiple incidents, including a train derailment at Potters Bar. Despite exiting the rail maintenance business during October 2003 and a change in management, Jarvis was burdened heavily with debts, compelling the sale of multiple divisions. While Jarvis was viewed by some commentators as recovering by 2008, its financial backers became unwilling to extend further credit to the company by 2010. Accordingly, Jarvis went into administration at the end of March 2010 and was dissolved shortly thereafter.

== History ==
=== 19th and 20th centuries ===
The company was founded as the Jarvis Construction Company in 1846. For over a century, the firm focused its efforts on the construction sector, growing at a relatively slow but steady rate over this time. Javis plc was formally incorporated on 31 March 1988. Between 1998 and the end of 1991, the company roughly doubled in size following a series of acquisitions.

In 1994, Paris Moayedi was appointed as the Chief Executive of Jarvis; he opted to pursue an ambitious growth strategy focused on new and emerging sectors, refocusing the business on infrastructure maintenance and renewal. To this end, the company acquired the Northern Infrastructure Maintenance Company, a rail maintenance business, in 1996. During the following year, it also bought the rail freight business Fastline, and the railway engineering specialist Relayfast. During 1998, Jarvis entered the road and airport maintenance business through its acquisition of Streamline Holdings. That same year, the company became the most highly valued contractor on the London Stock Exchange, being valued at £1 billion at one point.

Beyond acquisitions, Moayedi was keen to secure large contracts for Jarvis, including the relatively new and controversial field of private finance initiatives (PFI). According to the business journalist Mark Leftly, Jarvis's strategy for winning such deals was to regularly issue low margin bids, meaning that even minor cost overruns would quickly make the awarded PFIs unprofitable and a drain on Jarvis' finances. During the Moayedi era, company executives became increasingly focused on seeking headlines and impressing the wider financial services sector.

During 2000, Jarvis was amongst several companies that was involved in legal action against the professional services firm PricewaterhouseCoopers over allegations of defamation.

=== 21st century ===
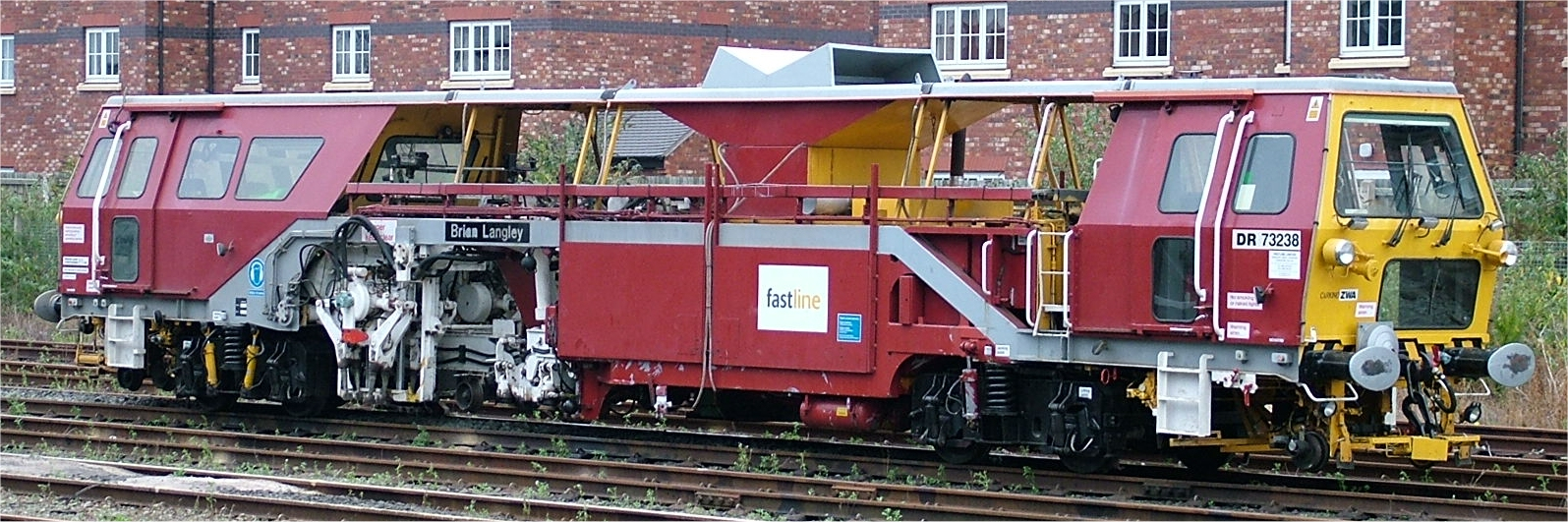
Tamper in Jarvis subsidiary Fastline livery.

In 2002, seven people were killed when a train derailed at Potters Bar after passing faulty and badly maintained points. As Infrastructure Maintenance Contractor for the line, Jarvis was held to be jointly responsible for the crash (along with Railtrack), with the Office of Rail Regulation declaring "Jarvis’s performance fell far short of that to be expected of a competent IMC".

On 16 September 2003, a GNER express derailed at just after departing Platform 4 at London King's Cross station. The immediate cause of the accident was the routing of the train onto a length of track with a missing rail. The length of rail had been removed during maintenance work, as is permissible, but it should not have been possible for a train to be routed onto the section of track where the rail had been removed. While the accident did not have an immediate impact, Jarvis was the private contractor employed to maintain the track and had failed to do so properly; considerable damage to the company's reputation was also incurred.

One month after the derailment, Jarvis announced that it was exiting the rail maintenance business; the move marked the end of private company-led rail maintenance in Britain, which resulted in all future work being administered by the state-owned company Network Rail. At the time, its rail maintenance activities made up less than 15 per cent of the firm's turnover.

During late 2003, Moayedi resigned as chairman of the company, he was replaced by Steven Norris, formerly the Conservative Minister for Transport. By this point, the company had become over-extended and was burdened with £230m of debt; during October 2004, Jarvis was forced to sell its Private Finance Initiative (PFI) business to the French construction company Vinci. Further selloffs around this time included its European roads business to the French group Somaro, and its stake in Tube Lines to Ferrovial. The firm's debt burden was also reduced via a £350m debt-for-equity exchange. In September 2007, Network Rail announced that the number of track renewal contractors would be reduced from six to four; Amey/SECO, Balfour Beatty, Babcock First Engineering and Jarvis.

By 2008, Jarvis was reportedly showing signs that it had stabilised and was on the road to recovery; measures taken included the restructuring of its debt facilities to the sum of £10 million. Around this time, the company entered the vehicle hire business, operating a fleet of 1,700 vans by 2010. However, Jarvis was negatively impacted by the 2008 financial crisis, which compelled Network Rail to drastically curtail its business with contractors at a time in which it had become Jarvis' main client.

In March 2010, Jarvis announced that it was entering administration; a spokesperson for the company stated that: "Following negotiations with the company's secured lenders, it has today become clear that sufficient support will not be extended to the company to enable it to continue trading as a going concern." While the firm continued to trade for a time, by October 2011, the majority of the business was in the process of being wound up as a buyer could not be found, resulting in over 1,100 job losses.
