= British American Railway Services =

British American Railway Services Ltd
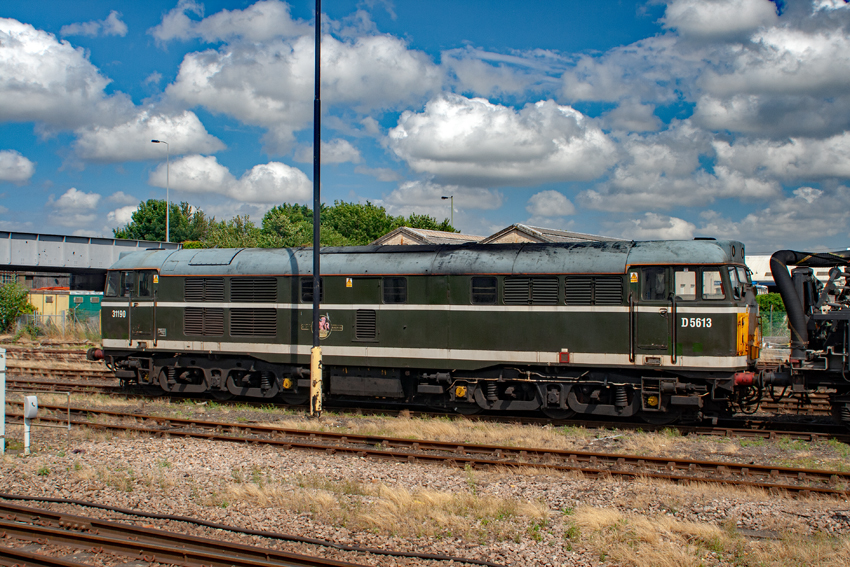
- BARS D5613 (31190) at Eastleigh in BR green livery
- Type: Limited company
- Industry: Railways
- Predecessor: ECT Rail Holdings
- Founded: 8 July 2008
- Defunct: 2020
- Headquarters: Stanhope, England
- Area served: Great Britain
- Services: Locomotive hire
- Parent: Iowa Pacific Holdings

British American Railway Services (BARS) was a British locomotive and spot hire private limited company. It was a subsidiary of Iowa Pacific Holdings.

The company was established on 8 July 2008 to acquire the rail assets of Ealing Community Transport.

BARS subsidiaries included RMS Locotec, Hanson Traction, Weardale Railway and Dartmoor Railway. BARS also owned Devon & Cornwall Railways which was active from 2011 until 2017. In January 2020 BARS announced that it intended to dispose of all its UK assets and on 27 June 2023 it officially dissolved.
