= Ghana Railway Development Authority =

Governmental Institution Responsible For Railways in Ghana

Government Office overview
- Formed: 14 November 2008
- Headquarters: Accra
- Government Office executives: Ernest Yaw Owusu, Chief Executive Officer; Dr. Martin Ayanore, Chairperson of the board of directors
- Parent department: Ministry of Railway Development (Ghana)

The Ghana Railway Development Authority (GRDL) is the institution mandated by the 1992 constitution of Ghana to act as the regulatory authority for all activities related to railways in Ghana.

It is a statutory body established by the Railways Act, 2008 (Act 779) to ensure the development and modernization of the railway systems, both national and suburban in Ghana.

== History ==
The Ghana Railway Development Authority was established on November 14, 2008 to promote the development and management of suburban railway.

== Leadership ==
Richard Dombo was the chief executive officer of the Ghana Railway Development Authority from 2017 until he died in 2021. He was replaced by Ernest Yaw Owusu in 2021. Dr. Martin Ayanore was appointed as the chairman of the board of the Ghana Railway Development Authority, and was sworn in on 14 September 2021.
