= UK Rail Leasing =

Railway services company

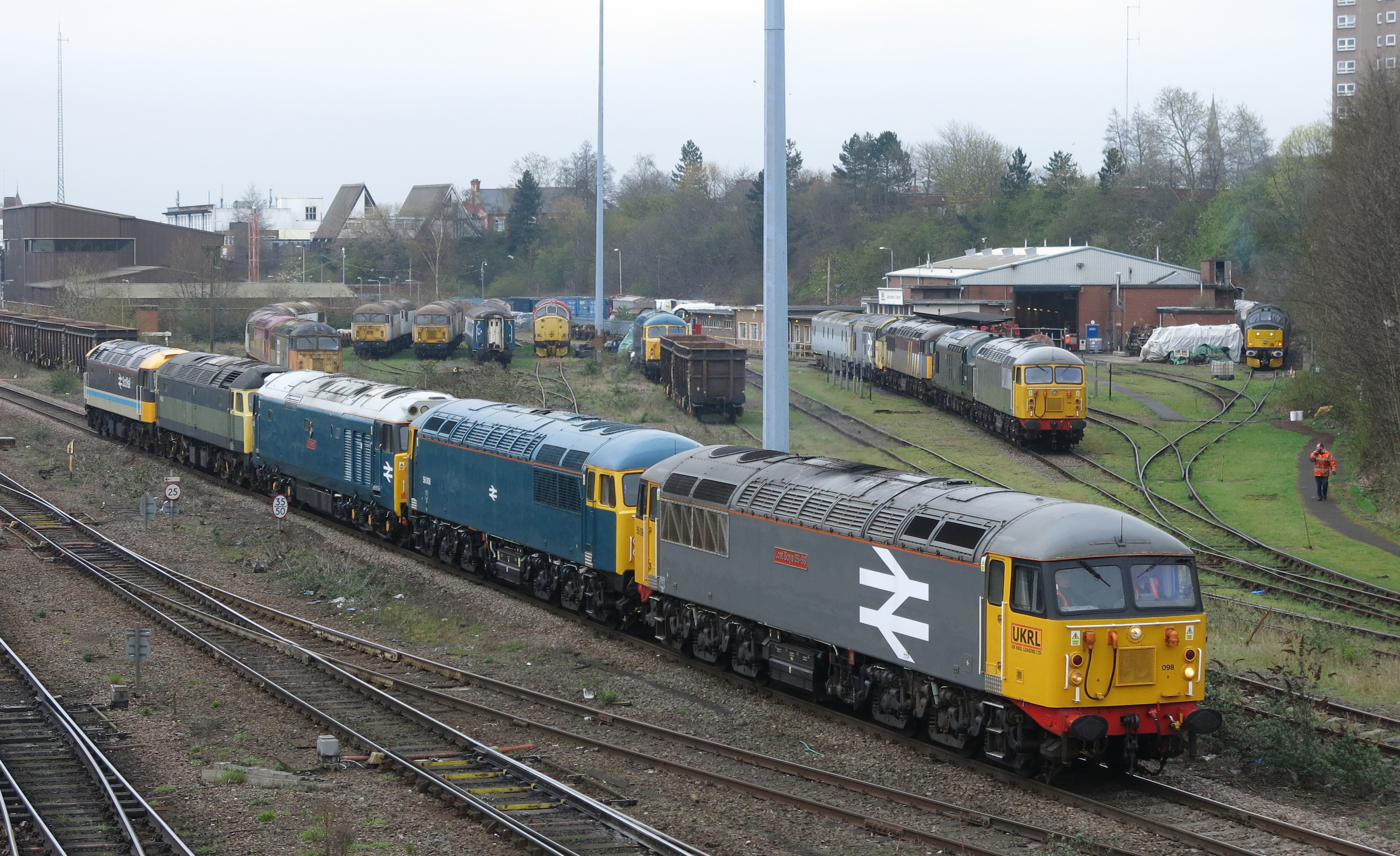
- UK Rail Leasing's Leicester depot in 2016

Overview
- Dates of operation: September 2013–

Other
- Website: www.ukrl.co.uk

UK Rail Leasing (UKRL) is a British railway company offering locomotive leasing and rolling stock engineering services to various train operating companies. It is based in Leicester.

UKRL was founded in September 2013; within two months, it had secured the lease of a rail depot in Leicester, which it promptly modernised, while 16 Class 56 and two Class 37/9 diesel locomotives were also acquired. During 2014, UKRL secured a rolling stock maintenance arrangement with the train operator East Midlands Railway; similar work would also come from CrossCountry and other regional operators. In November 2014, UKRL's first Class 56 locomotive was certified for main line use and hired out to the British freight operator Freightliner; further locomotives would be returned to service and leased out throughout the following three years.

In addition to overhauling its own fleet, UKRL has performed locomotive overhauls for Electric Traction Limited, Europhoenix and Rail Operations Group. The company also investigated major upgrades for the Class 56, which included reengining and new electronics. During June 2018, it was announced that all 16 of UKRL's Class 56s had been purchased by the freight operator GB Railfreight (GBRf); the company was also contracted to work on GBRf's fleet of Class 92 electric locomotives. That same year, UKRL bought the Leicester depot, where it was making additional investments to expand the firm's maintenance, engineering, and overhaul capabilities.

== History ==
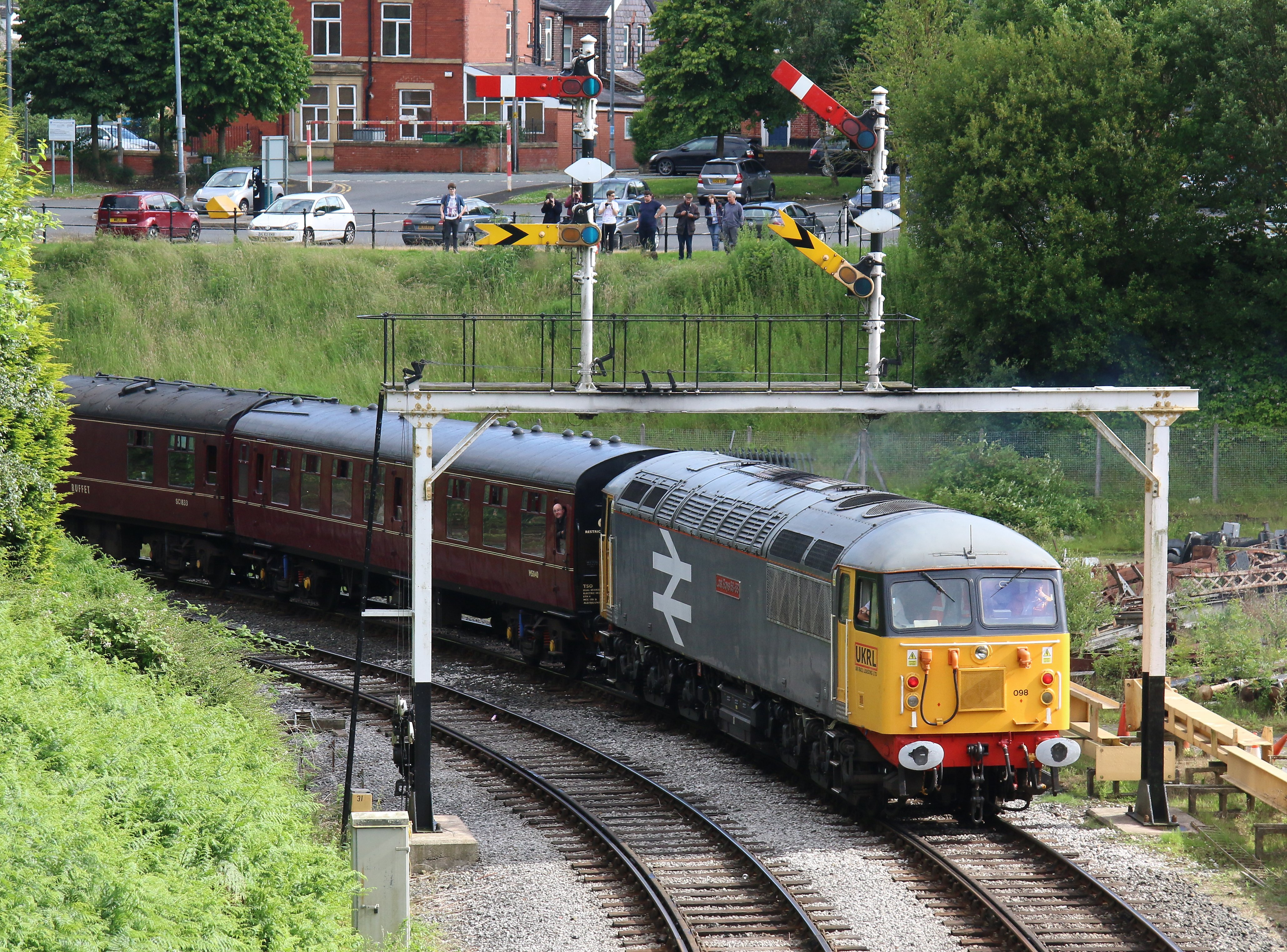
Class 56 on a service to Heywood

The origins of UK Rail Leasing (UKRL) can be traced back to its founders, Edward Stevenson and Mark Winter, who established the company in September 2013 and promptly took out a three-year lease on a disused rail depot in Leicester then-owned by the freight operator DB Schenker. By November of that year, it had purchased a fleet of 16 Class 56 and two Class 37/9 diesel locomotives, many of which having been formerly operated by DB Schenker. By January 2014, the Leicester depot had been refurbished and extensively rebuilt with a raised roof, with new equipment such as lifting jacks installed. UKRL was in the process of overhauling up to 13 of its Class 56s with a view to reactivating them for spot-leasing to various operators; these endeavours had reportedly been accelerated in response to customer demand for the type.

In 2014, UKRL came to an arrangement with the train operator East Midlands Railway to provide overnight maintenance and servicing activities to the latter. To accommodate this, it invested in an up-to-date Traincare and CET facility; this has since been used by other train operating companies, such as CrossCountry. Throughout the 2010s, additional investment was made at the Leicester depot to expand the firm's maintenance, engineering, and overhaul capabilities.

During November 2014, UKRL's first locomotive (56081) was certified for main line use and was promptly hired out to the British freight operator Freightliner; the company was reportedly keen to hire further locomotives from the company. In comparison to acquiring new-build locomotives, overhauled Class 56s could be supplied at roughly half the price and within a third of the time. By November 2015, a further two of UKRS's Class 56s (56098 and 56104) had been certified for main line use. Further locomotives were returned to service as restoration work was completed.

In mid-2014, UKRL were reportedly considering a series of extensive upgrades for the Class 56; this package of works included the installation of a new engines along with various electronics; the proposed arrangement involved two 1,900 hp engines for a combined output of 3,800 hp. However, this was emphasised to be "blue sky thinking" and not likely to happen soon. During early 2016, Alan Lee, UKRL's Head of Engineering, spoke further on this initiative, which was presented as a cost-efficient solution to freight operators' need for heavy haul locomotives, and that seven prospective customers, both domestic and overseas, had been identified. By this point, three different options were being considered; these were: two main engines, a single main engine, or a single main engine plus an auxiliary engine. It is expected that a re-engined Class 56 would cost around £1.8 million, compared to £3 million for a new locomotive.

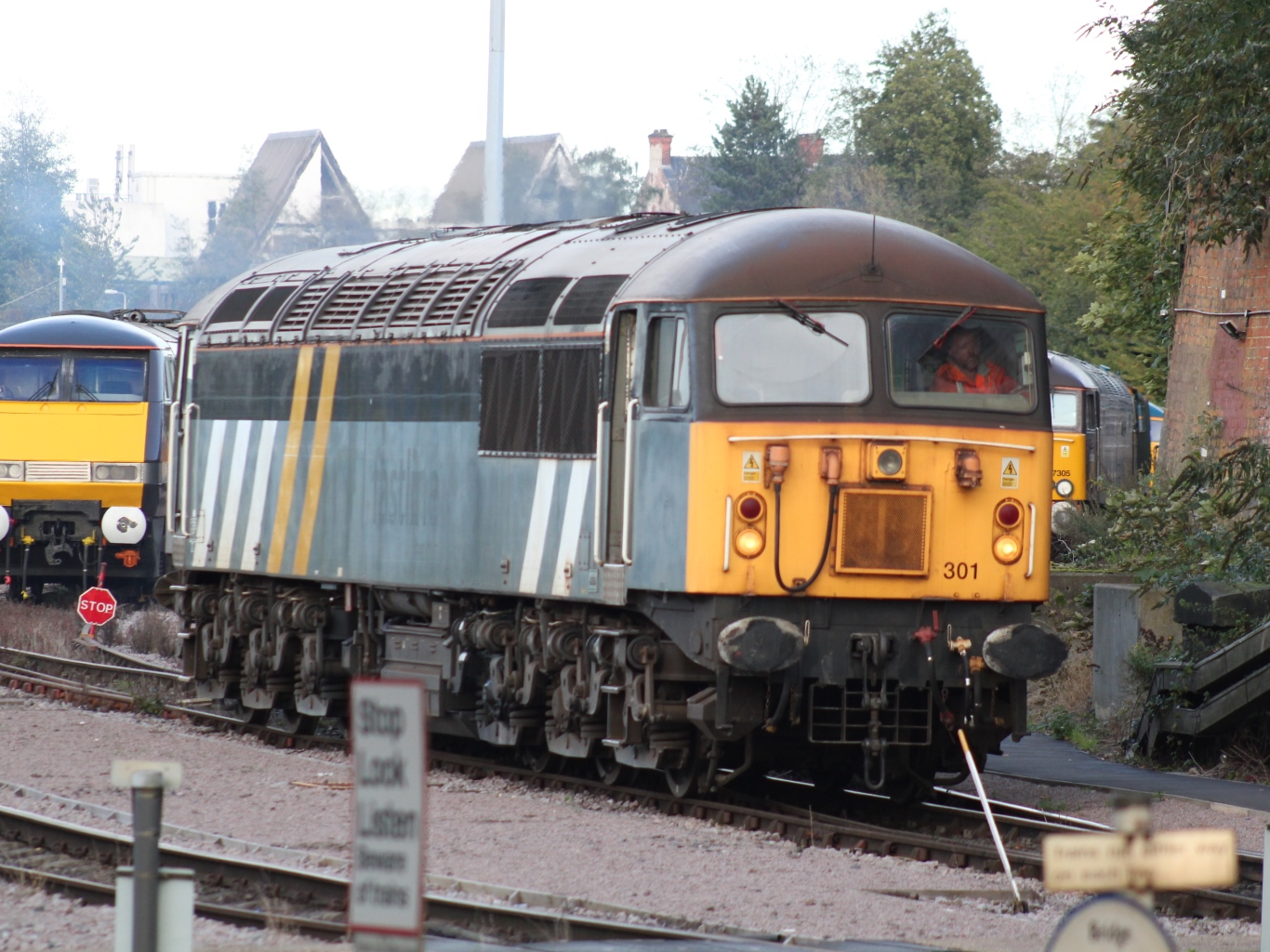
class 56 operated by UK Rail Leasing

During June 2018, it was announced that all 16 of UKRL's Class 56s had been purchased by the freight operator GB Railfreight (GBRf), shortly thereafter, several were transported from Leicester to Electro-Motive Diesel's Longport facility. GBRf has also contracted UKRL to work on its Class 92 electric locomotive fleet, including the changing of traction motors and wheelsets, modifications to the brake stack and coolers, along with identifying and implementing reliability enhancements. In July 2018, UKRL acquired the Leicester depot's freehold.

== Services ==
=== Design innovations ===
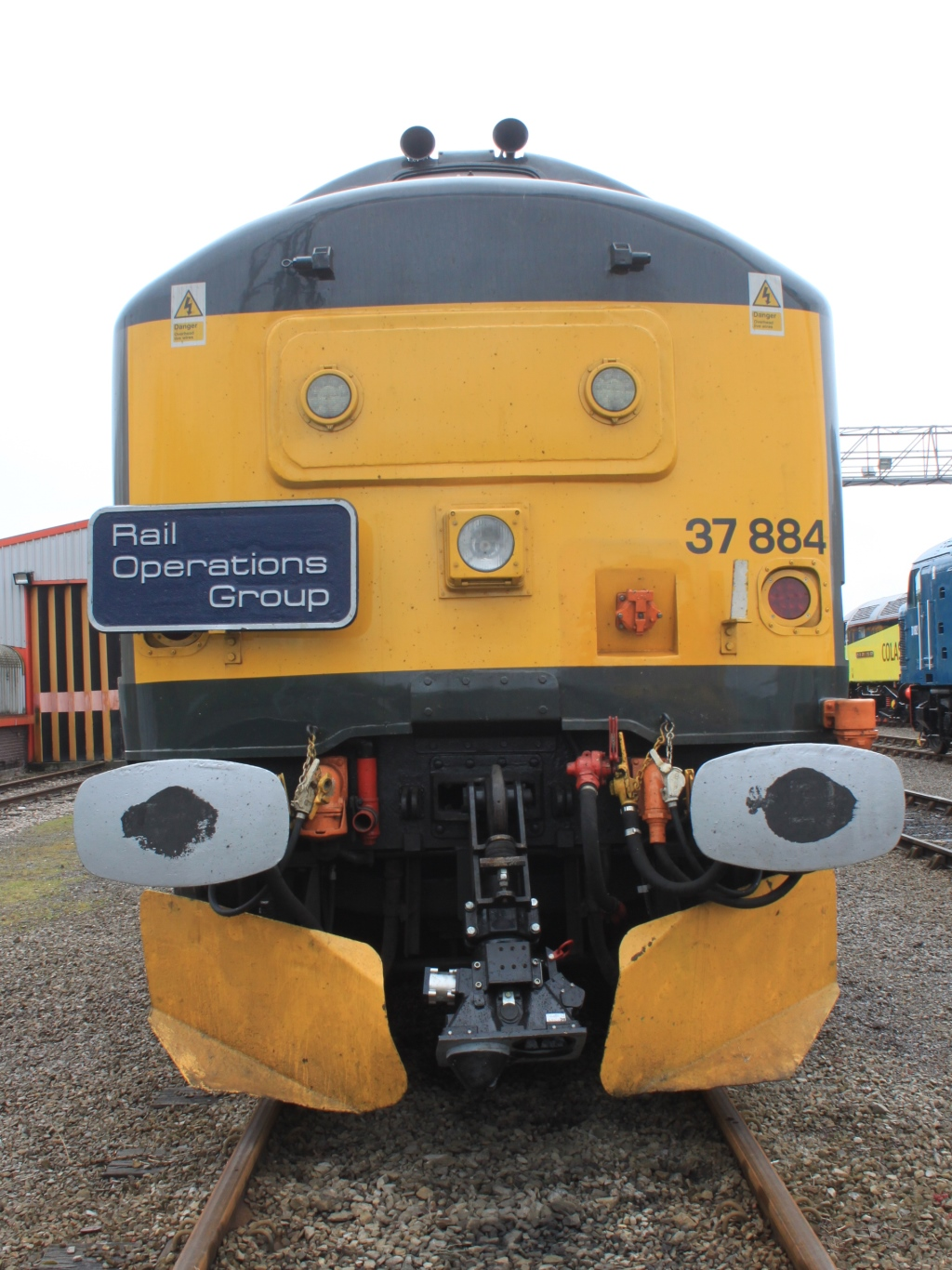
Coupler detail

A significant proportion of the Rail Operations Group (ROG) second generation multiple unit moves involved use of translator vehicles, as the locomotive was unable to connect directly to the tightlock coupler. On 10 July 2017, a pair of Class 319 multiple units were hauled by a Class 37 locomotive leased to ROG fitted with the new coupler.

=== Leasing ===
UKRL frequently hired out its overhauled Class 56s to other various operators. This activity ceased with the sale of the locomotives in mid 2018.

=== Maintenance services ===
As well as overhauling its own fleet, UKRL has undertaken overhaul work for Electric Traction Limited, Europhoenix and Rail Operations Group.
