= Nemesis Rail =

British railway spot-hire company

Nemesis Rail Limited

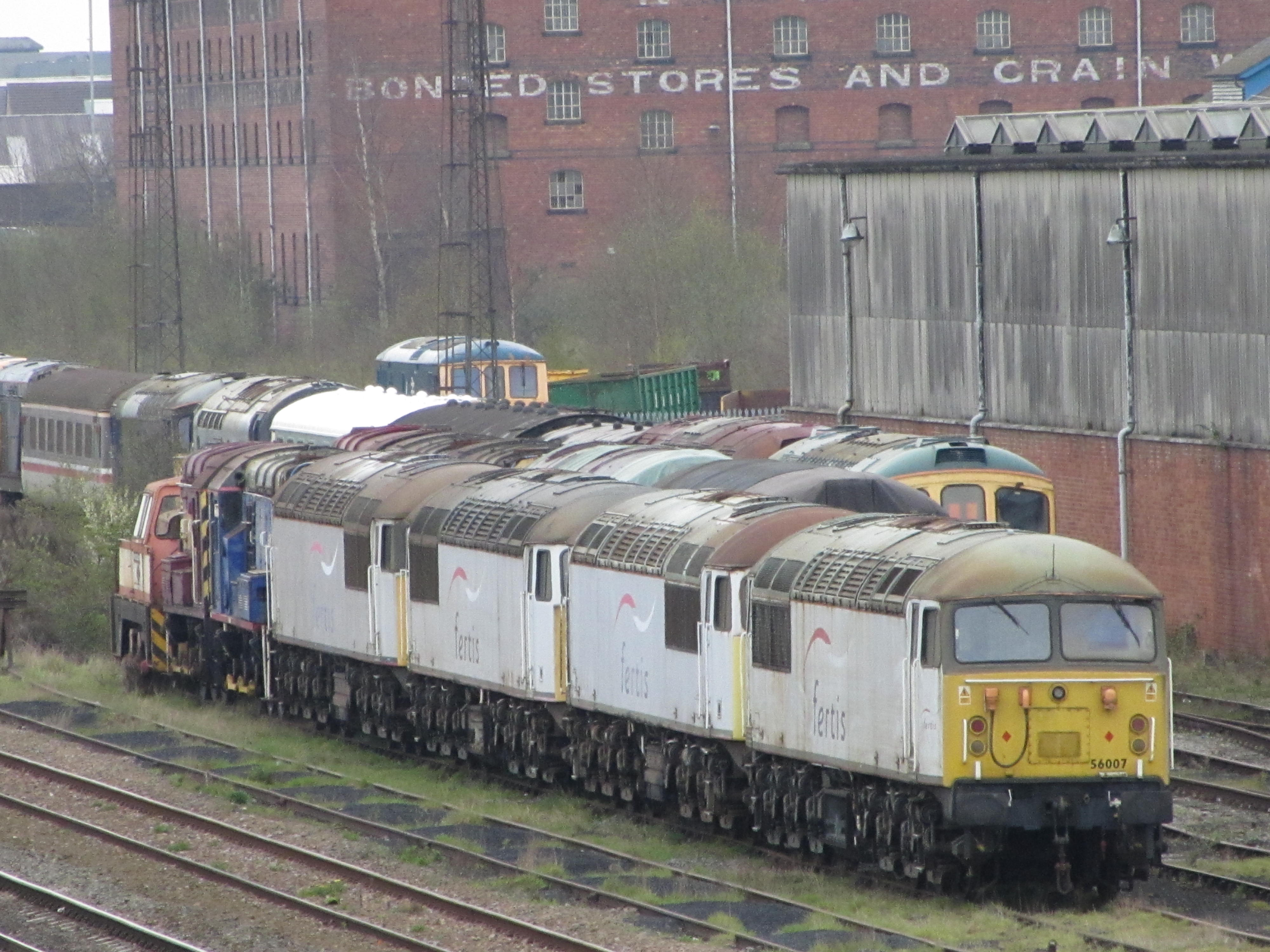
- Class 56s at Burton Nemesis Rail Depot on 7th April 2012
- Company type: Private
- Founded: January 2007
- Founder: Martin Sargent
- Headquarters: Burton upon Trent, England
- Services: Locomotive maintenance Locomotive spot-hire
- Website: www.nemesisrail.com

Nemesis Rail is a railway maintenance and spot-hire company. It is currently based in a depot on Derby Road, Burton upon Trent, that was formerly a British Rail wagon works that had been closed in the 1990s.

Nemesis Rail was founded in January 2007 and initially based at the Barrow Hill Roundhouse, near Staveley, Derbyshire, prior to moving to the Burton upon Trent location in July 2011. It provides maintenance, overhaul, modification, painting and recommissioning services across a wide variety of rail vehicles for train operators and private owners alike. The company also owns a number of former British Rail locomotives, the majority of which are not in an operational condition and are awaiting restoration.

== History ==
Nemesis Rail was incorporated in January 2007 by founder Martin Sargent, who had previously owned the railway charter company FM Rail. The company was initially based at the Barrow Hill Roundhouse, near Staveley, Derbyshire. In July 2011, the company relocated to a former British Rail wagon works in Burton upon Trent that had been deactivated during the 1990s. The Burton upon Trent site is equipped with two through-pitted roads and lifting jacks rated to lift up to 120 tons, a dedicated paint shop area, and other servicing amenities, along with sidings and storage space.

Nemesis Rail provides a range of maintenance services, having returned a variety of rolling stock to operational condition for both passenger and freight purposes, and has performed certifications and examinations of both locomotives and coaches on behalf of various companies. The company also undertakes special projects, such as the refurbishment of British Railways Mark 2 carriages with Pullman-style interiors and exterior liveries, and carrying out modifications to Network Rail maintenance vehicles. It has also handled accident repairs, as well as component recovery and final disposal of rail vehicles.

While the majority of its activities revolve around rolling stock owned by other companies, Nemesis Rail also owns its own rolling stock, including at least one Class 31 diesel locomotive (31461), which was stored for a time at the Burton depot ahead of its planned return to service. By the start of 2016, the company owned several locomotives that would be capable of main line operations once restored, including Class 31s, Class 33s, Class 37s, Class 47s and Class 73s, but none were reportedly in operational condition.
