= ECT Mainline Rail =

Defunct British railway rolling stock company

ECT Mainline Rail was a British railway rolling stock hire and maintenance company.

It was one of several 'new' companies that sprang up after the demise of FM Rail at the end of 2006. A subsidiary of Ealing Community Transport, it had a base at Barrow Hill Engine Shed. It owned some ex-British Rail Mark 2 carriages and several ex-British Rail Class 31 diesel locomotives. It ceased to trade in 2008 and its assets were assigned to RMS Locotec, which is now a subsidiary of British American Railway Services.
