= British Rail Class 31 =

Class of diesel-electric locomotives

Brush Type 2 British Rail Class 31
- 31 249 and 31 314 at Banbury in 1979
Type and origin
- Power type: Diesel-electric
- Builder: Brush Traction
- Serial number: 71–90, 119–178, 180–280, 282–326, 362–398
- Build date: 1957–1962
- Total produced: 263
Specifications
- Configuration
  - UIC: (A1A)(A1A)
  - Commonwealth: A1A-A1A
- Gauge: 4 ft 8 1/2 in (1,435 mm) standard gauge
- Wheel diameter: Driving: 3 ft 7 in (1,092 mm); Idling: 3 ft 3 1/2 in (1,003 mm)
- Minimum curve: 4.5 chains (300 ft; 91 m)
- Wheelbase: 42 ft 10 in (13.06 m)
- Length: 56 ft 9 in (17.30 m)
- Width: 8 ft 9 in (2.67 m)
- Height: 12 ft 7 in (3.84 m)
- Loco weight: 106.7 long tons (108.4 t; 119.5 short tons) to 113 long tons (115 t; 127 short tons)
- Fuel capacity: 550 imp gal (2,500 L; 660 US gal)
- Prime mover: Original: Mirrlees JVS12T; Rebuilt: English Electric 12SVT
- Generator: Brush TG160.48
- Traction motors: Four Brush TM73
- Transmission: Diesel electric
- Train heating: 31/0 & 31/1: Steam; 31/4: Electric Train Heat (Index 66)
- Train brakes: Vacuum / Dual (Air/Vac)
- Safety systems: AWS
Performance figures
- Maximum speed: D5500–5534: 80 mph (129 km/h); Remainder: 90 mph (145 km/h)
- Power output: Engine: Mirrlees: 1,250 bhp (930 kW) or 1,365 bhp (1,018 kW); English Electric: 1,470 bhp (1,100 kW); At rail: 1,170 hp (870 kW)
- Tractive effort: Maximum: 35,900 lbf (159.69 kN)
- Brakeforce: 49 long tons-force (488.24 kN)
Career
- Operators: British Railways; EWS; Fragonset Railways; FM Rail; Mainline Rail; Nemesis Rail; Network Rail
- Numbers: D5500–D5699, D5800–D5862, later 31001–31970
- Nicknames: Goyles, Peds, Toffee Apples, Gurglers
- Axle load class: Route availability 5 or 6
- Withdrawn: 1975–2017
- Disposition: 36 preserved, remainder scrapped

The British Rail Class 31 diesel locomotives, also known as the Brush Type 2 and previously as Class 30, were built by Brush Traction from 1957 to 1962. They were numbered in two series, D5500-D5699 and D5800-D5862. Construction of the first locomotive was completed in the final week of September 1957, and the handing-over took place on 31 October. The first Class 31 entered service in November 1957, after the launch of the Class 20 locomotive and was one of the Pilot Scheme locomotives ordered by British Railways to replace steam traction.

== Engines ==
They were originally built with Mirrlees JVS12T 1,250 bhp (930 kW) (D5500–D5519) and 1,365 bhp (1,018 kW) engines and Brush electrical equipment, but the engines were not successful and in 1964 D5677 was fitted with an English Electric 12SVT engine (similar to the 12CSVT used in the Class 37 but without an intercooler) rated at 1,470 bhp (1,100 kW). The trial proved successful, and between 1965 and 1969 the entire class was re-engined. The de-rated engine was used as it was the maximum the electrical system could accept.

== Classification ==
The Mirrlees-engined locomotives were originally known as Class 30 under TOPS, with re-engined examples joining Class 31. The class was originally intended for service on the Eastern Region, but gradually became common in both the Western and London Midland regions too.

=== Sub-classes ===
Several sub-classes of Class 31 exist:

- 31/0 - First batch of locos, fitted with Red Circle electro-magnetic control equipment - withdrawn in the late 1970s as non-standard. RA 5
- 31/1 - The standard locomotive, fitted with Blue Star electro-pneumatic control. RA 5
- 31/4 - As Class 31/1 but fitted with Brush Electric train heating (ETH) apparatus, index 66. RA 6
- 31/5 - Former 31/4 with the ETH isolated for Civil Engineers Department use. RA 6
- 31/6 - Standard locomotive through wired for ETH but without ETH apparatus. RA 5

==== Class 31/0 ====
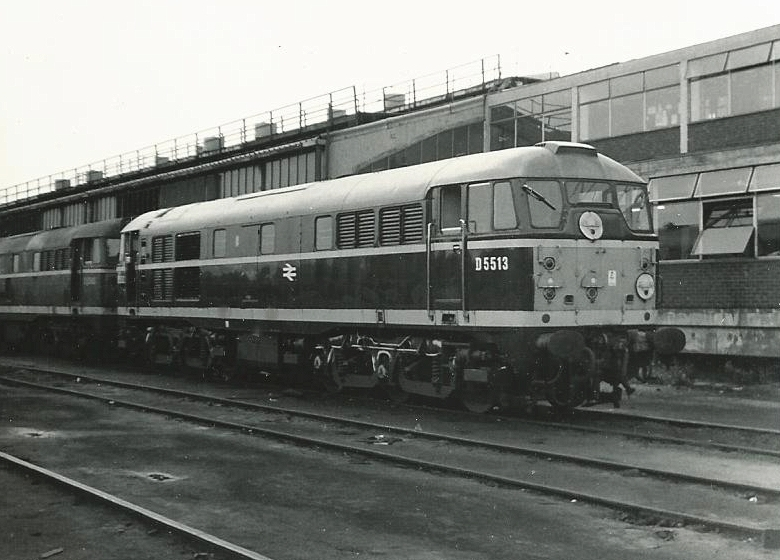
D5513, one of the original batch, in BR green livery

These first 20 locomotives, originally numbered D5500–D5519, were always easily recognisable as they did not have the headcode box mounted on the roof above the cab, leading to the nickname "Skinheads". These pilot scheme locomotives were non-standard in having Electro-Magnetic Multiple-Working control equipment, and were limited to 80 mph (130 km/h). After being involved in a serious collision D5518 was rebuilt in September 1967 as a standard locomotive, with indicator boxes, and blue star coupling code.

They were allocated to East Anglian sheds throughout their service, ending up allocated to Stratford, their initial shed, and latterly sporting that depot's trademark silver roof. Upon withdrawal four locomotives were converted at Stratford into train pre-heating units. Locomotives 31013, 31002, 31014 and 31008 were renumbered ADB968013 to ADB968016 in the order given; ADB968014 was allocated to Bounds Green depot on the Great Northern main line and ADB968015 was based at Great Yarmouth, while the remaining two were allocated to Stratford.

==== Class 31/1 ====
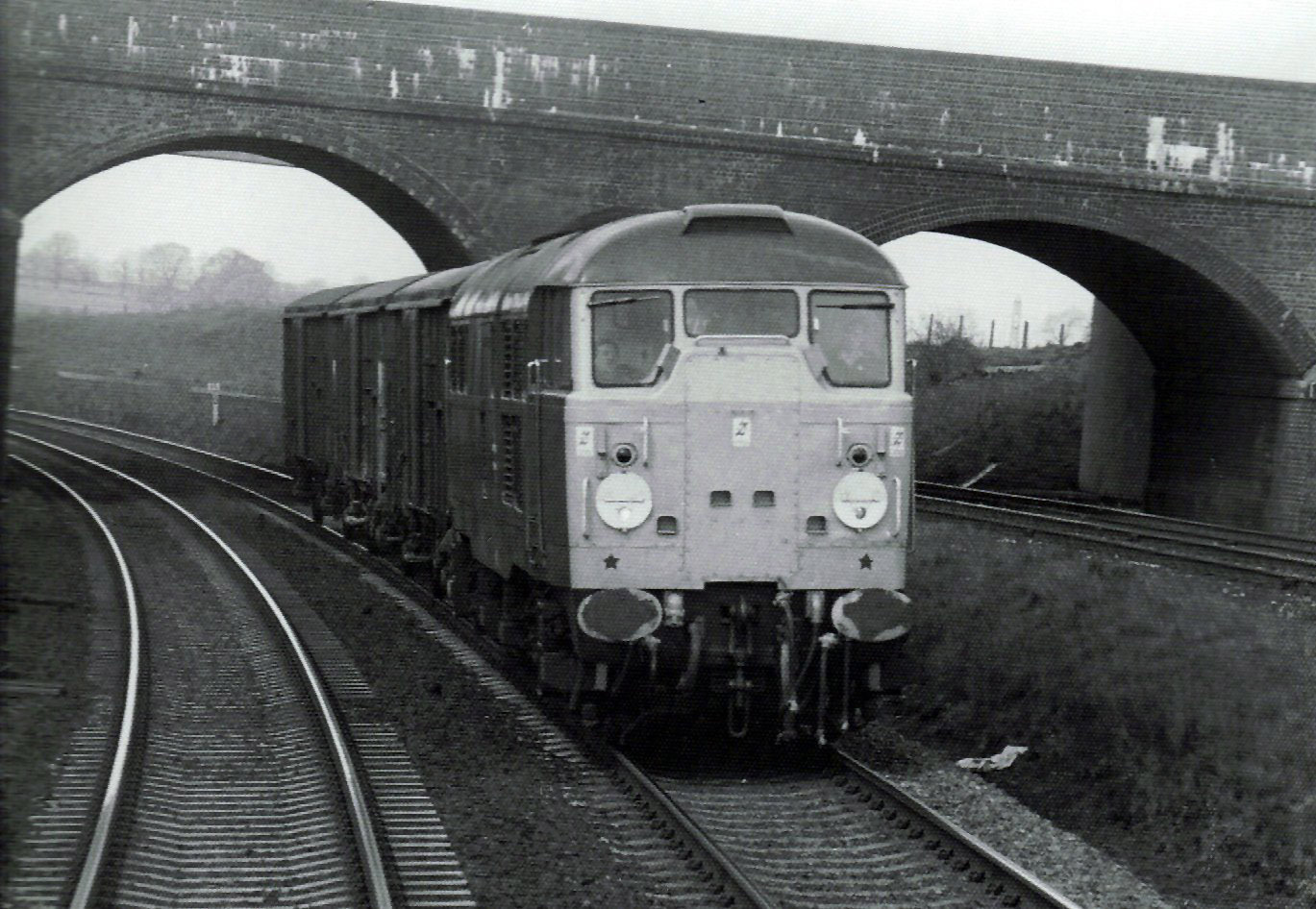
Class 31/1 on Sharnbrook bank with a short van train in 1985

The first few locos externally had much in common with the original 31/0s as twenty lacked the roof mounted headcode box (D5520–29/35/39/42/47/51/52/55/56/59/62), and fifteen were also limited to 80 mph (130 km/h) (D5520–D5534), but were otherwise the same as subsequent locos. The whole sub-class had steam heating boilers fitted, had the Blue Star Electro-Pneumatic multiple-working controls as found on many other BR classes. The Class 31/1s could be found on a variety of secondary and relief passenger duties as well as parcels and freight traffic. While used in East Anglia, with locos allocated to Stratford and March depots, they were found throughout the Eastern Region of BR with Finsbury Park sporting a large allocation along with the depots at Tinsley, Immingham and Thornaby. Locos were also allocated to Bristol Bath Road and Old Oak Common on the Western Region, where they could be found working passenger trains as far west as Barnstaple and Paignton. In the early 1980s Healey Mills and Bescot on the Midland Region also gained an allocation as replacements for Class 25s.

==== Class 31/4 ====
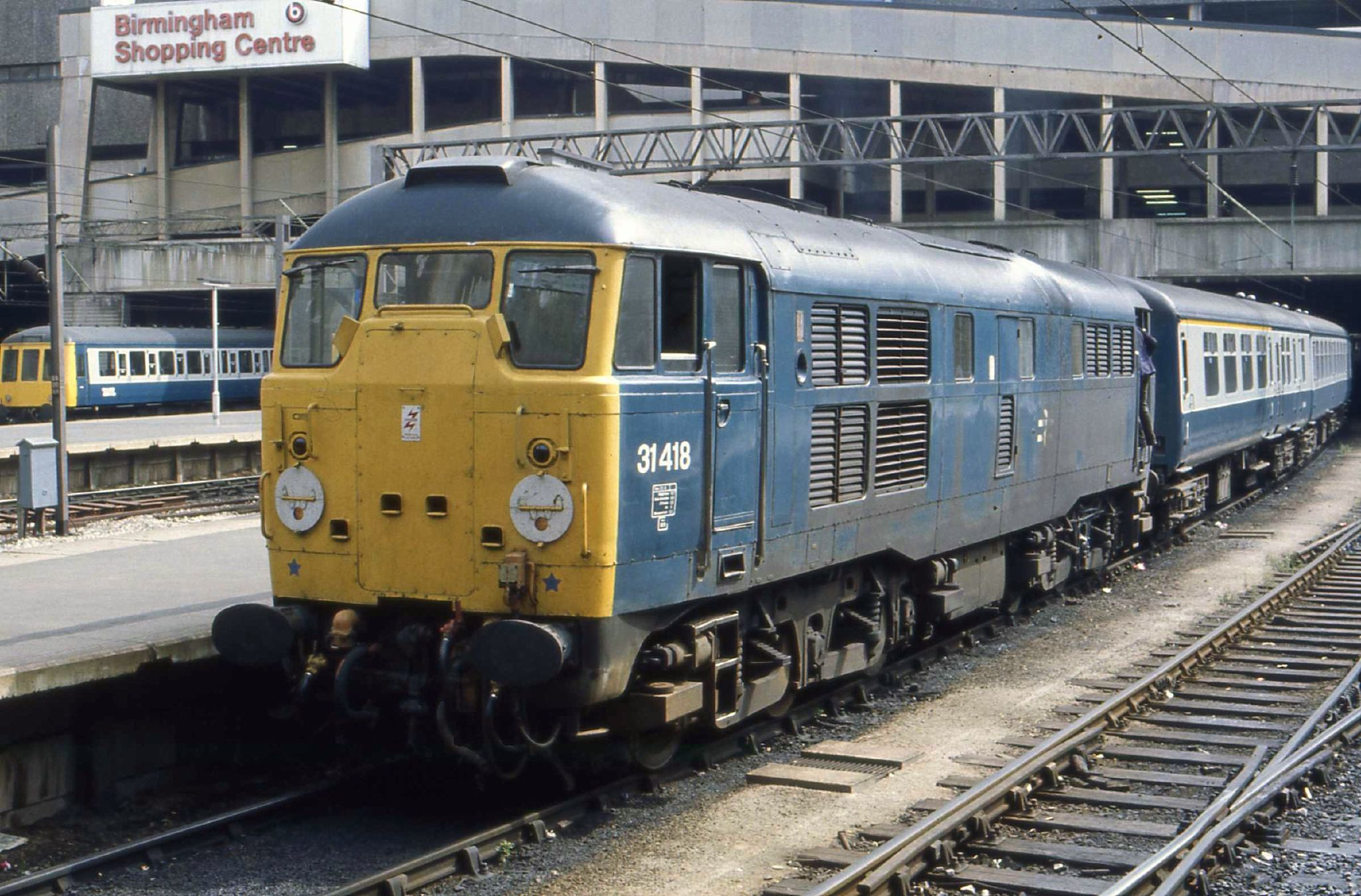
31418 at Birmingham New Street

The Class 31/4s, numbered from 31400 to 31469, were conversions of 31/1s to which electric train heating (ETH) was fitted. They had an ETH index of 66, equivalent to 330 kW, which was sufficient to power trains of up to eleven Mk 3 carriages. This allowed them to pre-heat long trains moving between depot and a station for a service to be worked by a larger locomotive. When passenger services were worked by 31/4s they rarely exceeded four or five carriages. 330 kW accounted for about a third of the total electrical power output. When ETH was being supplied, the traction power output of the 31/4 subclass was therefore limited to around two-thirds of that of the non-ETH variants; this did not help the performance of an already somewhat underpowered locomotive.

==== Class 31/5 ====
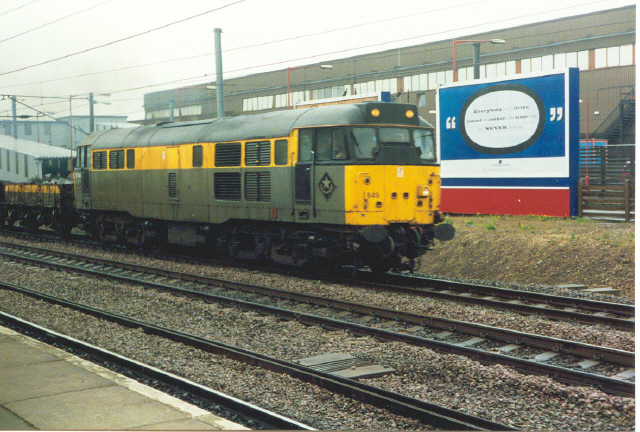
31549 at Peterborough in 1994

In the late 1980s with increased use of "Sprinter" type units on previously loco hauled diagrams, there were ETH fitted Locomotives to spare and with this in mind, some Class 31s were selected to have their ETH cables removed from the front buffer beam. This was done to try to prevent passenger sectors of BR borrowing the locomotives from the Freight sectors, and to cut down on maintenance of surplus equipment. The re-numbering was achieved by simply adding 100 to the existing TOPS number i.e. 31407 became 31507. When the re-numbering was taking place, most locos were still in standard BR Blue livery and the 4 in the number was painted over and a 5 placed over the top. Some of the sub-class were painted into Civil Engineers all over Grey livery, although most were subsequently painted into the "Dutch" Yellow and Grey livery. Only 31530 (Sister Dora), 31544 (Keighley and Worth Valley Railway) and 31568 (The Engineman's Fund) were named when numbered as a 31/5. 31544 was also notable as the only one of the sub-class with the original "skinhead" style cabs without the route indicators on the roof.

==== Class 31/6 ====
Only two locomotives (31601 and 31602, formerly 31186 and 31191 respectively) received this modification, performed during their time with Fragonset Railways. This modification means they are through wired for Electric Train Heating (ETH) but cannot actually provide it. This means they can be coupled to a train behind another locomotive, and the front locomotive is still able to heat the train via the wiring on the 31/6. 31601 is now preserved at the Ecclesbourne Valley Railway where it regularly operates trains while 31602 was scrapped after being withdrawn.

== Operation ==
Initial deliveries of Class 31/0 locomotives were to Stratford depot in east London and deliveries continued with Class 31/1 locos going to the Eastern and North Eastern regions. Class 31s were first used on the Western Region in 1969 when D5535 was allocated to Old Oak Common to work Empty Coaching Stock (ECS) trains into Paddington.

== Nicknames ==
The class were given a number of nicknames. The Class 31/0s were known as Toffee Apples, due to the shape of the control lever. More common names for the whole class were Goyles (short for "gargoyles" referring to the ugliness some people saw in the design), Peds ("Another derogatory name associating the locomotives with pedal cars in terms of speed and pulling power") and Gurglers, after the sound they made.

== Accidents and incidents ==
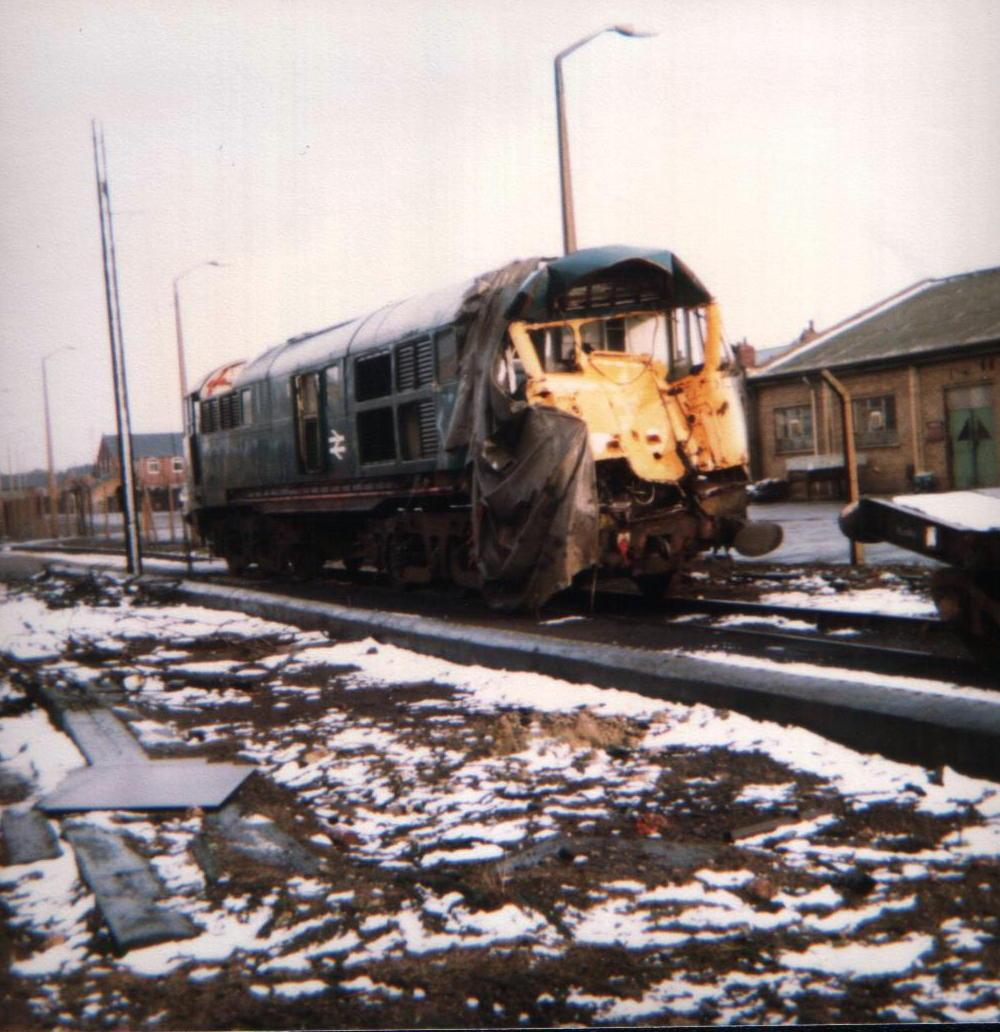
An unidentified Class 31 with accident damage

- On 11 September 1975, 31150 was involved in a head-on collision at Corby Tunnel, with a loose brake van and coke wagons. This locomotive was the first of the class to be withdrawn.
- On 3 January 1976, locomotive 31241 was hauling a parcels train when a light engine ran into its rear at Worcester Tunnel Junction. Time interval working was in force at the time.
- On 25 February 1979, locomotive 31421 was hauling an engineering train that was working under a possession between Fratton and Hilsea, Hampshire. The adjacent line was open to traffic. A crane in the engineering train was foul of the other line when it was struck by a passing passenger train. One person was killed and nine were injured.
- On 9 March 1986, locomotive 31436 was hauling a passenger train that was in a head-on collision with two light engines at Chinley, Derbyshire due to a signalman's error. One person was killed. Lack of training and a power cut were contributory factors.
- On 20 February 1987, a freight train ran away and was derailed by trap points at North Junction, Chinley. Locomotive 31440 was hauling a train that collided with the wreckage.
- On 28 October 1988 two unmanned Class 31 locos (31202 and 31226), presumably with brakes not fully applied, rolled off together along a short siding at North London's Staples Corner. After demolishing the buffer stop they ran down the embankment on to the North Circular Road, although nobody was hurt. The second loco of the pair landed on the roof of the leading one, remaining precariously balanced. They were both withdrawn after the incident.

== Commercial operators ==
Distribution of locomotives, March 1974
British Rail Class 31 is located in England
British Rail Class 31 is located in Greater London
Code	Name	Quantity
BR	Bristol Bath Road	13
CW	Cricklewood	2
FP	Finsbury Park	51
GD	Gateshead	8
HO	Holbeck	15
IM	Immingham	41
MR	March	52
OC	Old Oak Common	19
SF	Stratford	24
TE	Thornaby	12
TI	Tinsley	22
YK	York	4
Total:		263

=== Eastern Rail Services ===
In 2022 the only operational class 31/4 outside preservation was 31452 which is based at Great Yarmouth.

=== English, Welsh & Scottish ===
Before the introduction of Class 66, English Welsh & Scottish (EWS) took control of the Class 31s from the Mainline Freight and Trainload Freight companies. 31255 became the locomotive for the EWS livery paint trials but never ran on the main line and spent its life at Toton until being preserved in January 1999. 31466 was repainted into EWS colours for the Toton TMD open day in May 1998 and soon became the only one of the class to be in traffic running in the EWS colours until being preserved in February 2001. In their final days of EWS ownership, 31110 (scrapped at TJ Thompson's, Stockton in April 2007) was repainted into BR green in the summer of 1999 and featured its original number D5528 to mark the end of their working lives with EWS and worked the last EWS Class 31 hauled railtour. The final four EWS locomotives were withdrawn in February 2001. Of the two EWS liveried locos, both 31255 and 31466 are preserved, 31255 based at the Mid Norfolk Railway and 31466 based at the North Yorkshire moors railway.

=== FM Rail ===
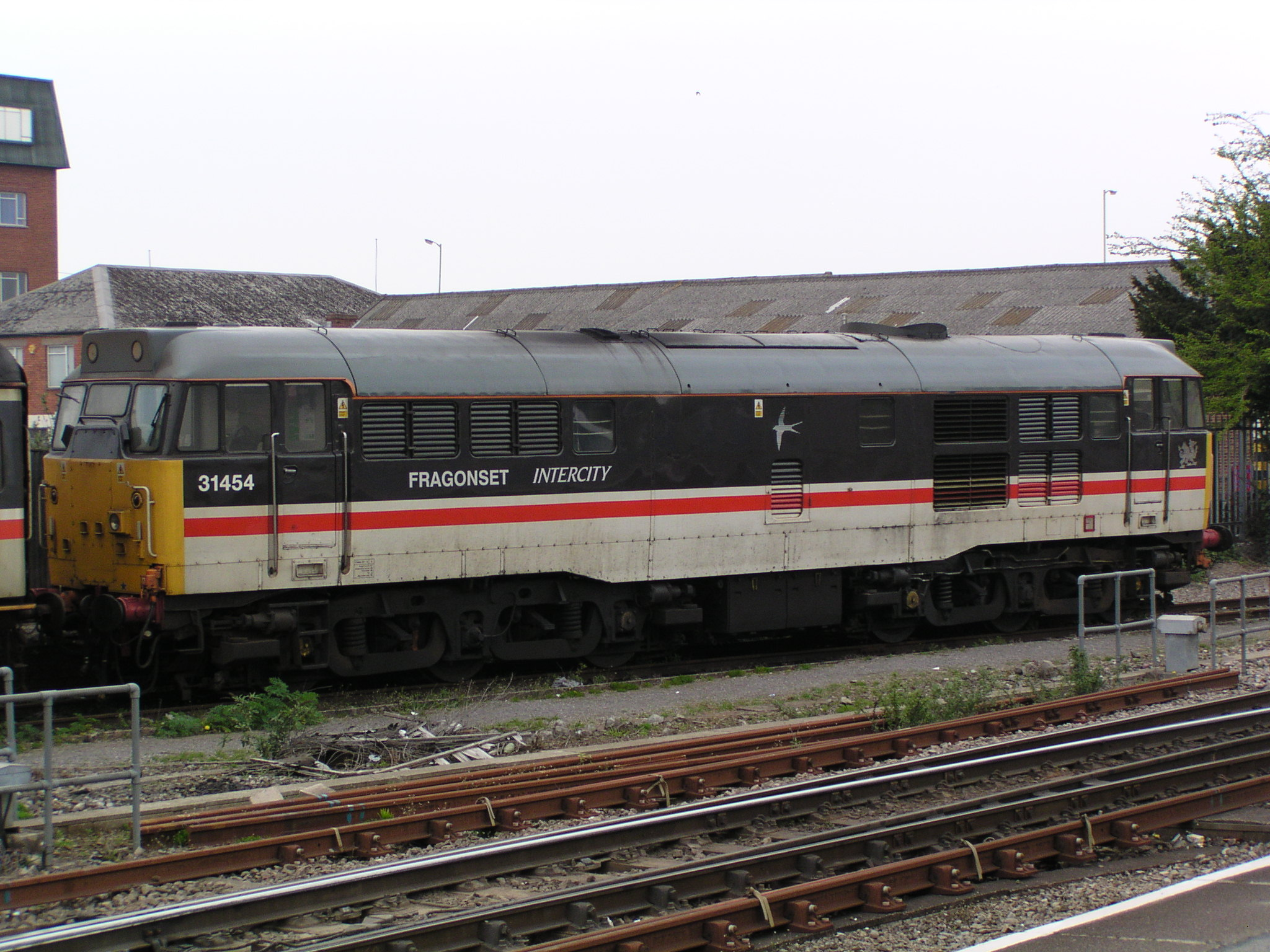
Locomotive 31454, in InterCity Swallow livery (with Fragonset Vinyls), 2004

In 1998, Fragonset Railways purchased four redundant Class 31 locomotives from EWS. The first of these, 31452, was quickly repaired and repainted in a new black livery with a red mid-body band. It was quickly followed by 31459 and 31468. Several more locomotives were also purchased, and in 1999, the first of two modified Class 31/6 locomotives re-entered traffic. The Class 31/6 31601 (ex 31186) & 31602 (ex 31191) subclass is essentially a modified Class 31/1 locomotive with through electric-train heating wiring. This enables a Class 31/4 and Class 31/6 to work in multiple and still heat the train, even if the no-heat Class 31/6 is attached to the carriages.

In 1999, Fragonset won a short-term contract with Silverlink for two locomotives to work in top and tail mode with two Mk. 1 carriages on the Marston Vale Line. This was to cover for the non-availability of Class 117 and Class 121 diesel multiple units. The trial was a success, and in 2000 it was repeated in the summer timetable. The locomotives were retained until displaced by more modern Class 150/1 units cascaded from Central Trains.

By this time, the Fragonset Class 31 fleet had expanded considerably to include three Class 31/1s, three Class 31/4s and two Class 31/6 locomotives. Regular work at this time included use hauling Class 317 electric multiple units from West Anglia Great Northern's Hornsey depot to Bedford for use with Thameslink. As units were still maintained at Hornsey, this meant regular workings between the two depots to swap units when maintenance was due. 31468 was broken up for spares, finally being scrapped 6 June 2018.

=== Hanson and Hall ===
Created in 2018, in 2022 Hanson and Hall had one of the three remaining operational Class 31s outside preservation. 31106 was stored at Bury on the East Lancashire Railway in Rail Blue livery but was later scrapped at EMR Kingsbury.

=== Mainline Rail ===
After the demise of FM Rail, several of its Class 31s passed to Mainline Rail, operated by RMS Locotec. As of November 2008, four 31/4s and one 31/6 were owned by RMS Locotec, which is a subsidiary of British American Railway Services.

=== Nemesis Rail ===
31128, an ex-Fragonset locomotive, is owned by Nemesis Rail and based at Burton upon Trent. In 2022 this locomotive is one of only three remaining operational Class 31s outside of preservation, and has been returned to BR Blue livery.

=== Network Rail ===
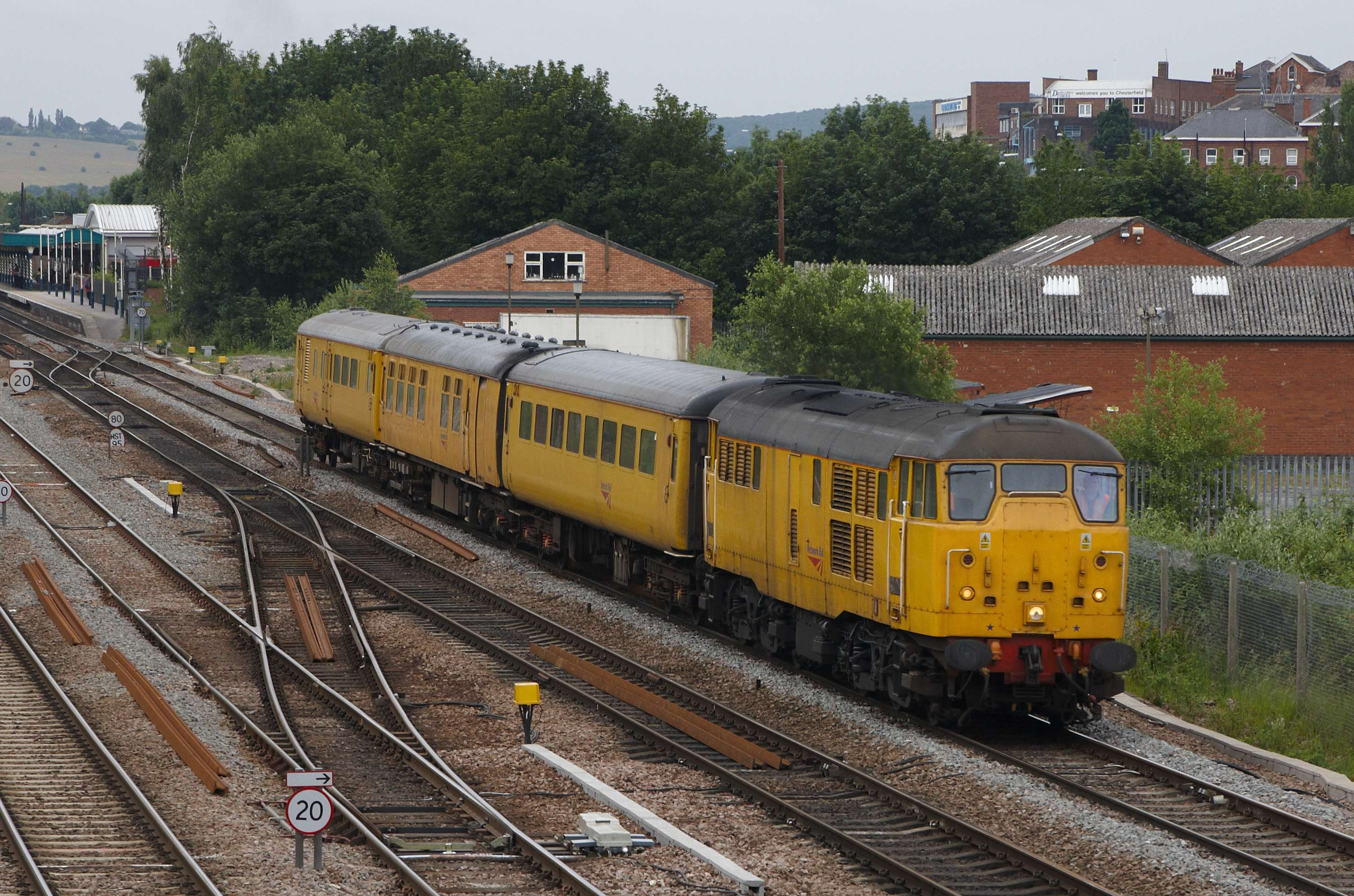
31105 passes Chesterfield working 4Q25 Derby RTC - Immingham TMD Test train

Network Rail operated a fleet of four Class 31 locomotives – 31105, 31233, 31285, and 31465 – to haul test trains around the network. The locomotives were purchased from Fragonset Railways, and overhauled at its Derby workshops. They were repainted in Network Rail's then new all-over yellow livery. 31285 and 31465 were offered for sale by tender in July 2015, and 31233 and 31105 in August 2018.

Prior to operating its own locomotives, Network Rail's predecessor, Railtrack, had hired two Class 31 locomotives from Fragonset. These two locomotives, 31190 and 31601, were repainted in Railtrack's blue and lime green livery. With the overhaul and entry into service of Network Rail's own locomotives, these two engines were returned to Fragonset. (They are now owned by British American Railway Services, based at Washwood Heath in Birmingham.)

Locomotive 31106, formerly Spalding Town, is privately owned by Howard Johnston, and after a period of lease to Fragonset, FM Rail, and RVEL which included extensive main line running for 11 years, including working as far north as Oban in Scotland, is based at the Weardale Railway. After inspection, it was successfully started on 17 October 2017 and moved under its own power for the first time in four years. Johnston purchased three more of the class from EWS, but they acquired new owners; 31107 (scrapped by C F Booth at Rotherham in May 2009, following a staged collision with a Renault Espace on a level crossing during Top Gear Series 9, Episode 5 in 2006 to demonstrate the danger of trying to beat a train at a crossing), 31289 (preserved at the Northampton and Lamport Railway), and 31301 (scrapped).

The last active Network Rail Class 31 was 31233, with it operating its last test trains in March 2017. In August 2018, Network Rail offered its final two Class 31s (31105 and 31233) for sale; both were purchased for preservation at Mangapps Railway Museum in Essex.

== Preservation ==
=== Currently preserved ===
The following members of the class have survived into preservation. This includes both the first and last produced (31018 and 31327, respectively). There were a further 11 which have subsequently been scrapped.

Numbers carried (Current in bold)				Name	Livery	Location	Notes
D5500 (Note: "Skinheads")	**31018**	–	–	–	BR Blue	Locomotion Museum, Shildon.	First-built locomotive, now part of the National Collection.
**D5518**	31101	–	–	–	BR Blue	Avon Valley Railway	Undergoing repairs
D5522	31104	**31418**	–	Boadicea	BR Blue	Midland Railway - Butterley	Undergoing restoration
D5523	**31105**	**31105**	–	Radio Caroline	BR Blue	Mangapps Railway Museum, Essex	Operational
D5526	**31108**	–	–	–	Railfreight Grey	Midland Railway - Butterley	
D5533	31115	**31466**	–	–	EWS Maroon/Gold	North Yorkshire Moors Railway	
D5537	**31119**	–	–	–	BR Blue	Embsay and Bolton Abbey Steam Railway	Stored
D5546	**31128**	–	–	Charybdis	BR Blue	Nemesis Rail, Burton-on-Trent	Operational
D5547	31129	**31461**	–	–	BR Blue	Nemesis Rail, Burton-on-Trent	Operational
D5548	**31130**	–	–	Calder Hall Power Station	Railfreight Grey	Avon Valley Railway	
D5557	31139	**31438**	31538	–	BR Blue	Epping Ongar Railway	
**D5580**	31162	–	–	–	BR Blue	Midland Railway - Butterley	
D5581	31163	**97205**	–	–	Derby RTC	Chinnor & Princes Risborough Railway	
**D5600**	31179	31435	–	Newton Heath TMD	BR Green	Embsay and Bolton Abbey Steam Railway	Undergoing Restoration
D5609	31186	**31601**	–	–	DCR Grey	Ecclesbourne Valley Railway	
**D5613**	31190	–	–		Golden Ochre	Plym Valley Railway	
**D5627**	31203	–	–	Steve Organ G.M.	BR Green	Pontypool and Blaenavon Railway	
D5630	**31206**	–	–	–	Civil Engineers	Ecclesbourne Valley Railway	Rescued from Booth's Scrapyard in 2006
**D5631**	31207	–	–	–	BR Green	North Norfolk Railway	One of the final three locomotives operated by EWS
D5634	**31210**	–	–	–	Railfreight Grey	Dean Forest Railway	Operational
**D5637**	31213	31465	31565	–	Network Rail Yellow	Weardale Railway	Undergoing restoration
D5654	31228	**31454**	31554	–	Intercity	Nemesis Rail, Burton-on-Trent	Stored
D5660	**31233**	–	–	–	Network Rail Yellow	Mangapps Railway Museum, Essex	Operational
D5662	**31235**	–	–	–	BR Blue	Dean Forest Railway	Stored
D5683	**31255**	–	–	–	EWS Maroon/Gold	Mid-Norfolk Railway	Repainted in EWS livery for paint trials
D5684	31256	**31459**	–		BR Blue		Social media suggests the locomotive is back at its home base Weardale Railway as of June 2026
D5695	31265	**31430**	31530	Sister Dora	BR Blue	Spa Valley Railway	
D5800	**31270**	–	–	Athena	Regional Railways	Didcot Railway Centre	Operational
D5801	**31271**	–	–	Stratford 1840-2001	Trainload Construction	Llangollen Railway	
D5809	**31279**	31452	31552	–	Intercity	Eastern Rail Services	Operational
D5814	**31414**	31514	–	–	Dutch Civil	Midland Railway - Butterley	Undergoing repairs
D5817	**31285**	–	–	–	Network Rail Yellow	Weardale Railway	Undergoing repairs
D5821	**31289**	–	–	Phoenix	BR Experimental Blue	Northampton and Lamport Railway	
**D5830**	31297	31463	31563	–	BR Golden Ochre	Great Central Railway (Nottingham)	On loan from the Great Central Railway
**D5862**	31327	–	–	–	BR Green	Strathspey Railway	Final locomotive built

=== Preserved then scrapped ===
In addition, the following locomotives were previously preserved, but have since been scrapped.

- 31113 ex-Chinnor and Princes Risborough Railway - scrapped in June 2008 at EMR Kingsbury after death of owner
- 31123 ex-Gloucestershire Warwickshire Railway - scrapped in February 2006 by A1A Locomotives
- 31144 ex-Weardale Railway - scrapped in January 2014. Both cabs preserved by the South Wales Cab Group, Bridgend.
- 31166 ex-Wensleydale Railway - scrapped in June 2009
- 31188 ex-Wensleydale Railway - scrapped in September 2008
- 31410 ex-Stainmore Railway - scrapped in September 2014 at CF Booths Rotherham
- 31421 ex-Midland Railway Butterley - scrapped in August 2007 after deal fell through for loco to get power unit ex. 31405
- 31442 ex-Churnet Valley Railway - scrapped in September 2004
- 31467 ex-East Lancashire Railway - scrapped in August 2008 after being stripped by metal thieves.
- 31468 ex-Weardale Railway - scrapped in June 2018.
- 31556 ex-East Lancashire Railway - scrapped in January 2010.

== Gallery ==
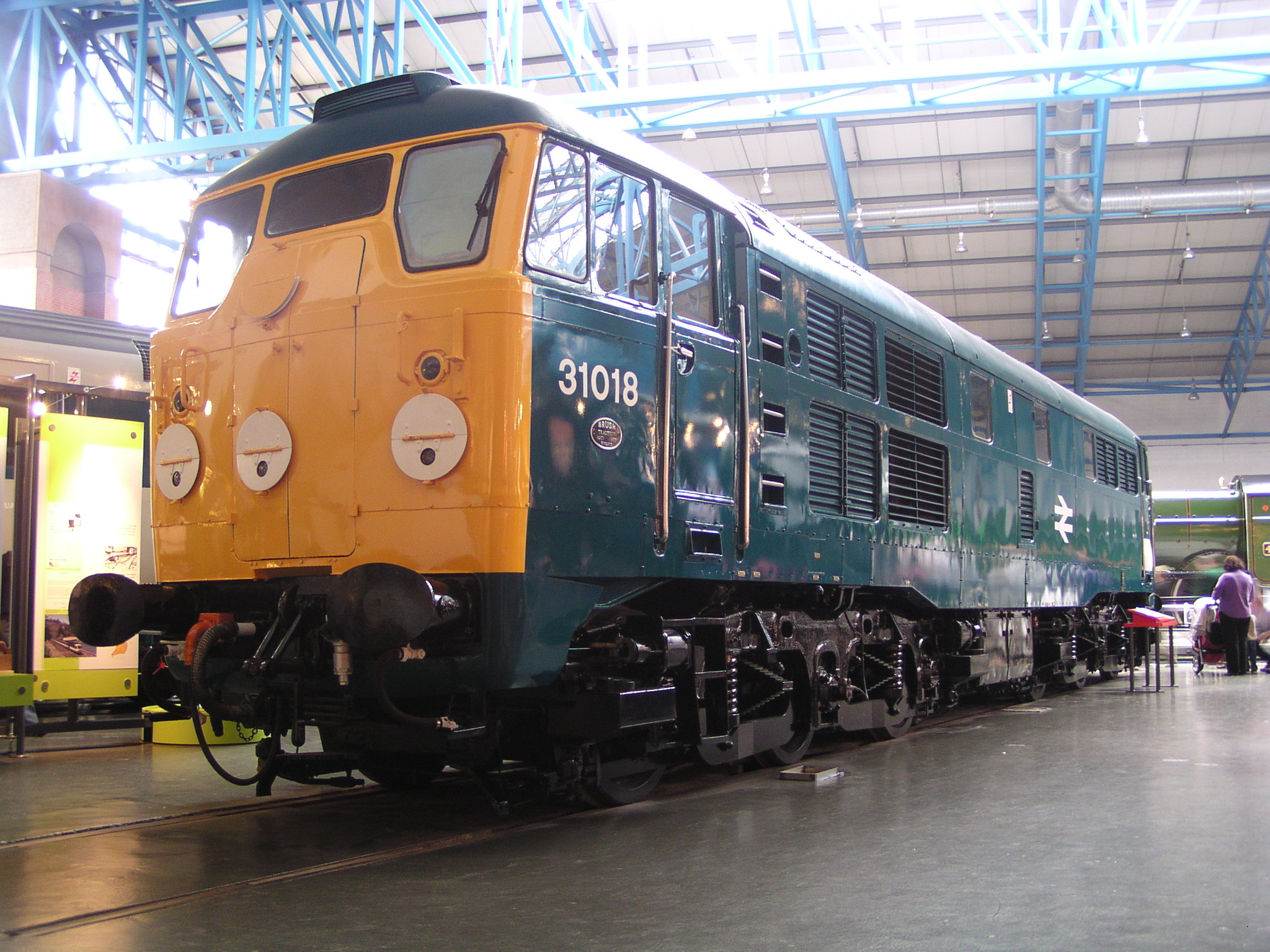
31018, at the National Railway Museum in York. This was the first locomotive of the class to be built in 1957. It was withdrawn from service in 1976. It currently carries BR Blue livery. Note the absence of over-window head code panel, which were only omitted from the first few locomotives.

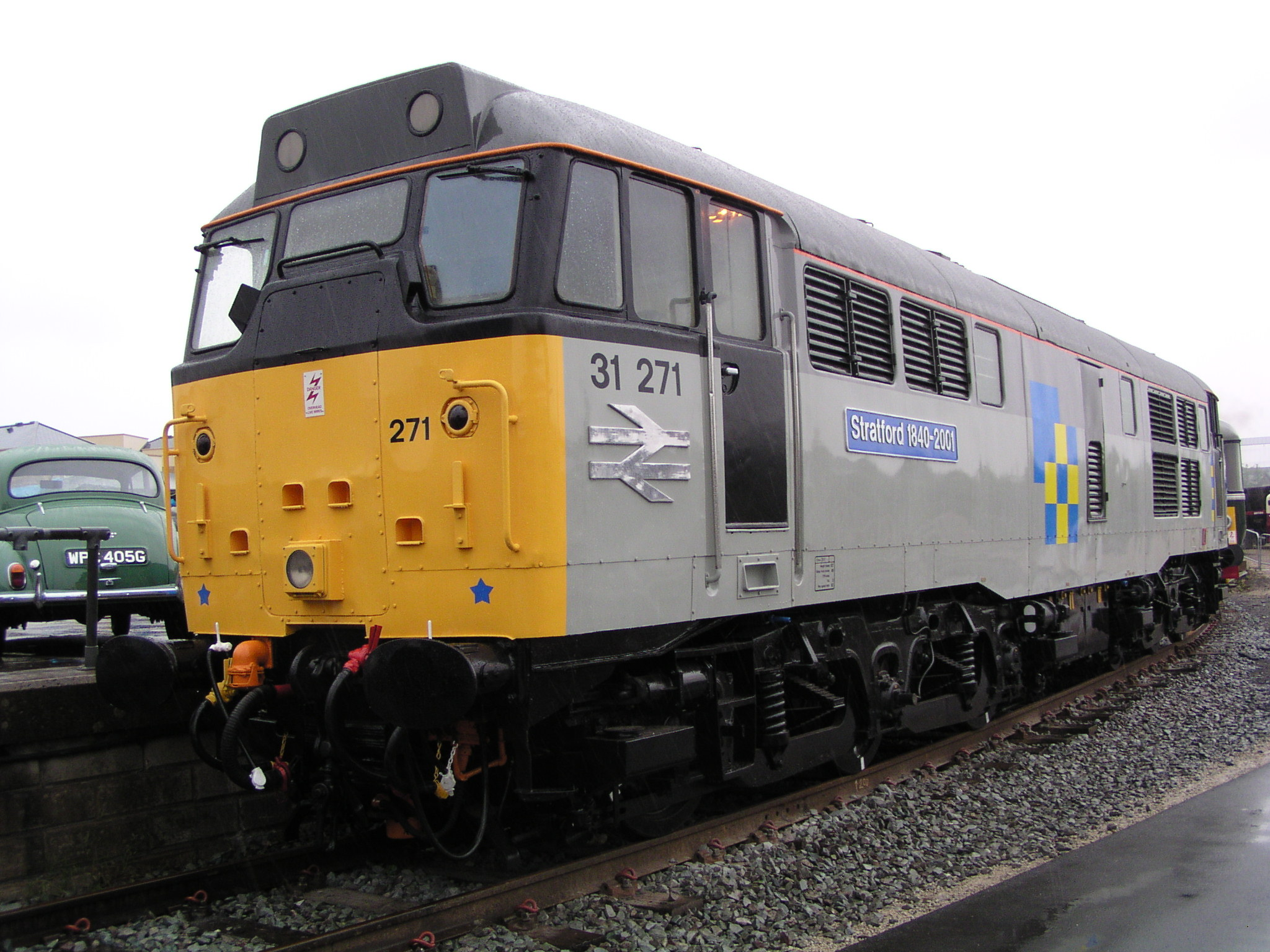
31271 Stratford 1840-2001 at the York Railfest held to celebrate the 200th anniversary of railways. Under the auspices of A1A Locomotives Limited, this locomotive spent the 2019 and 2020 seasons on the Llangollen Railway in North Wales.

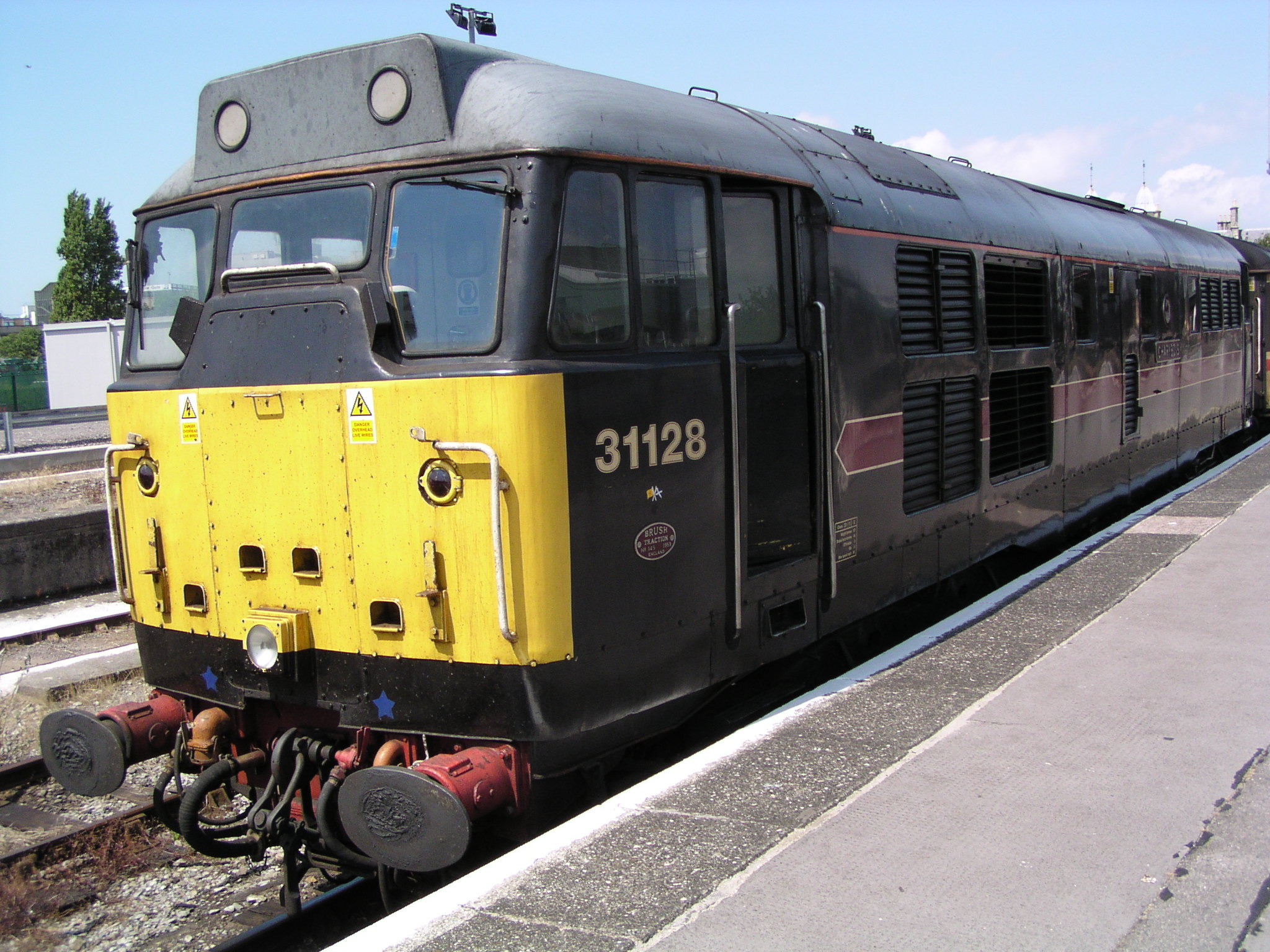
31128 Charybdis at Bristol Temple Meads. This locomotive was owned by Fragonset Railways, but hired to Wessex Trains to haul trains from Bristol to Brighton and Weymouth.

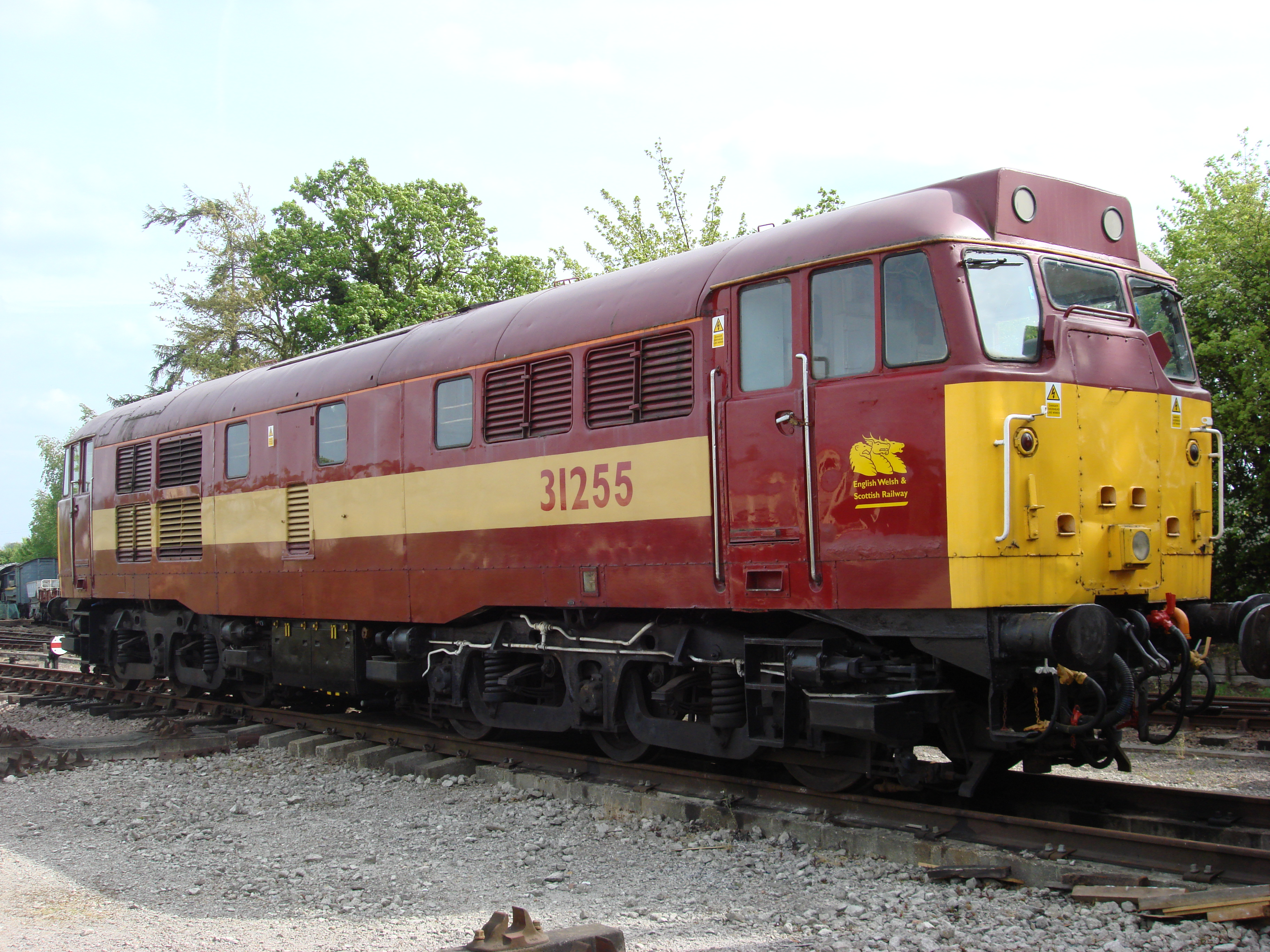
31255 at the Colne Valley Railway in EWS livery

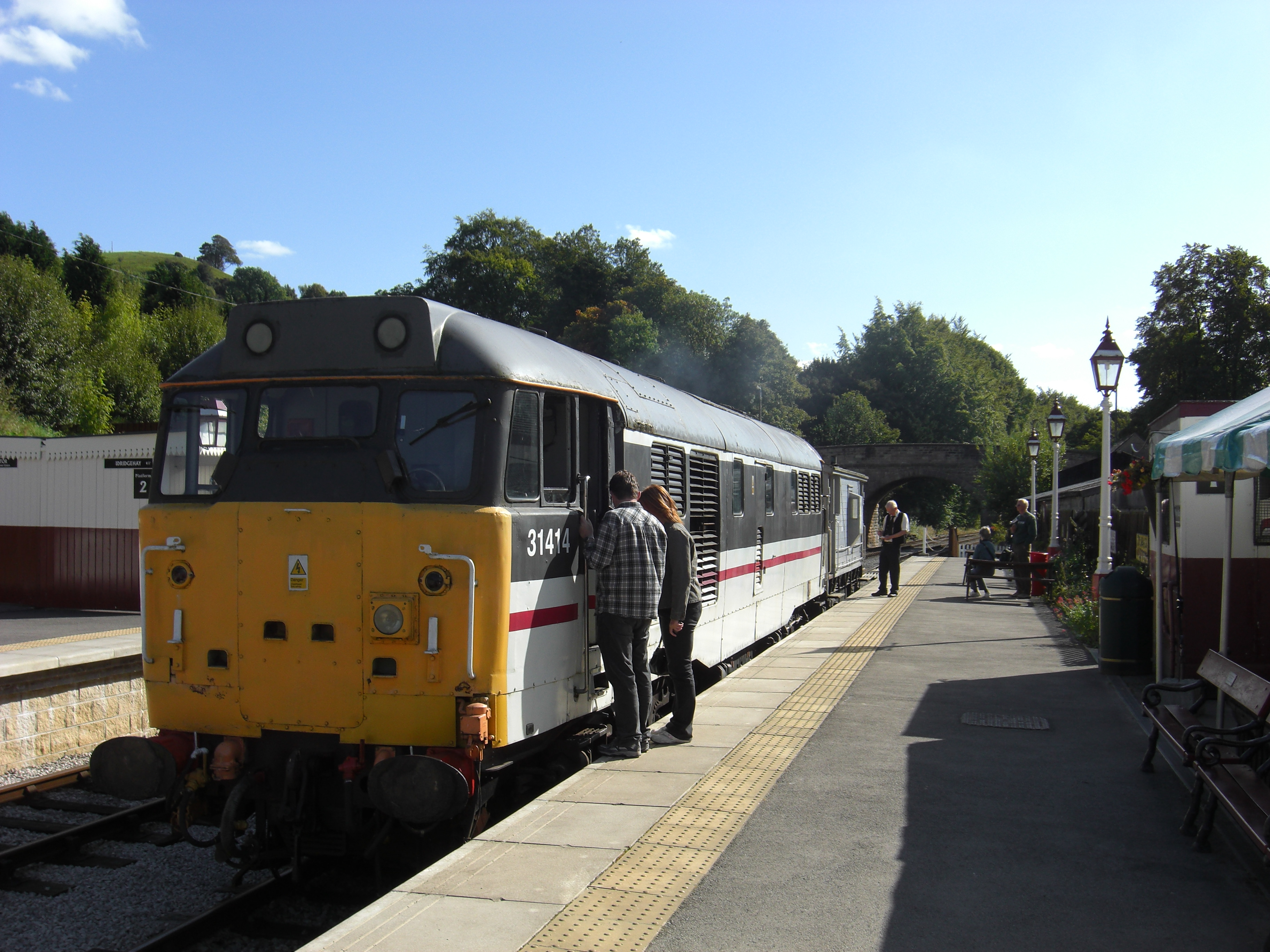
InterCity liveried 31414 running brake van rides on the Ecclesbourne Valley Railway.

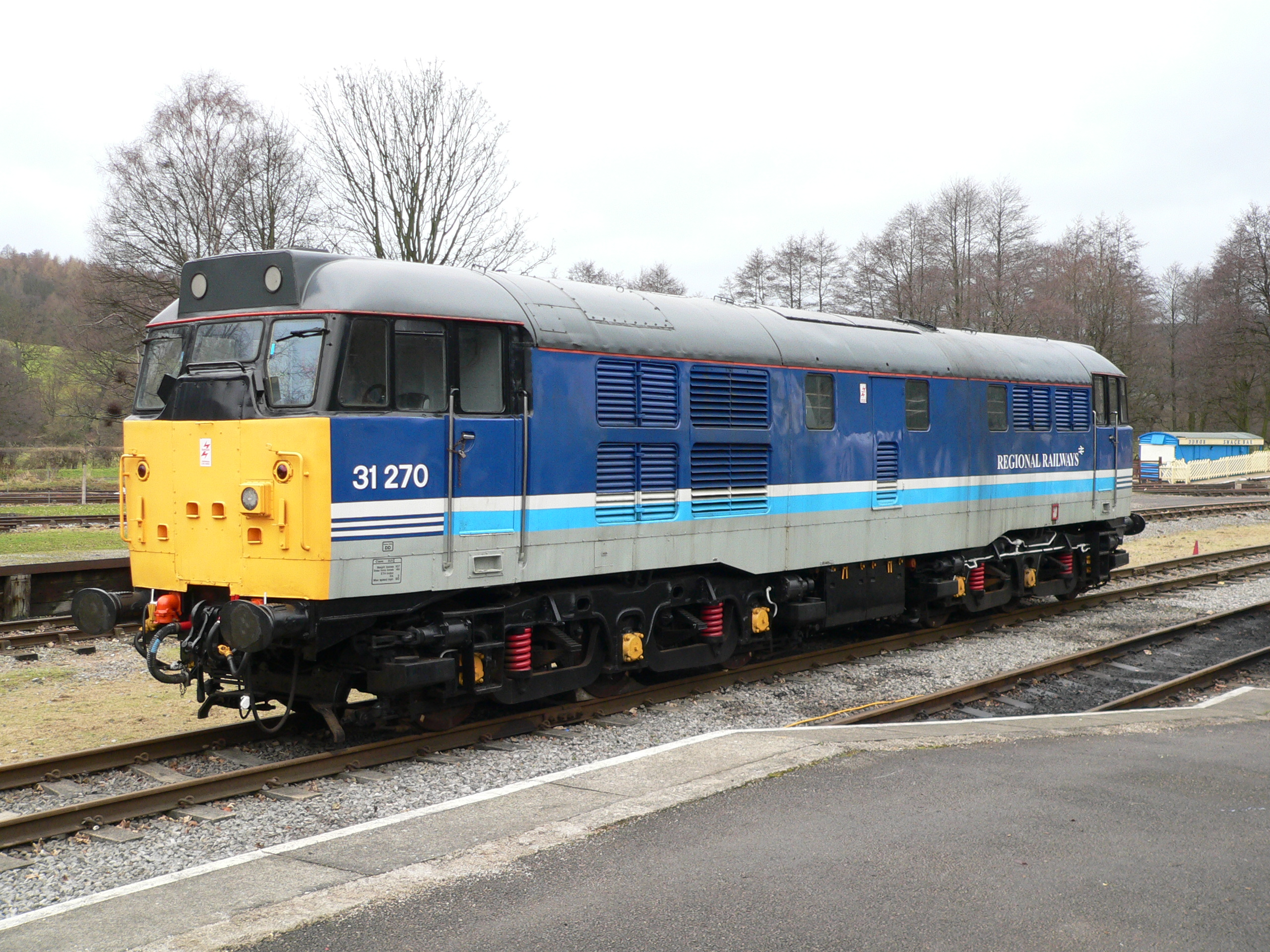
Regional Railways livery 31270 at Peak Rail, Rowsley, Derbyshire

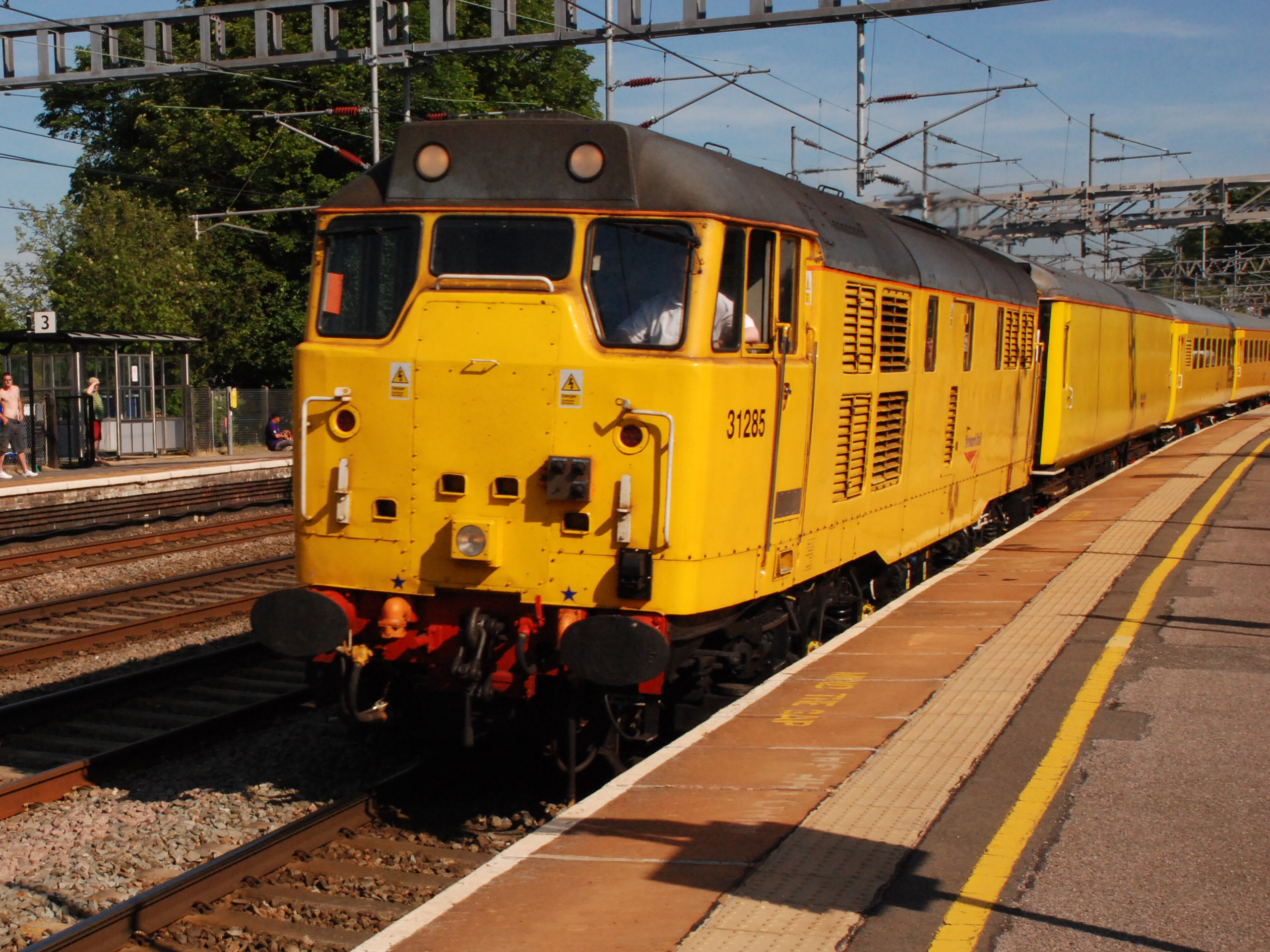
Network Rail 31285 speeds through Rugeley working a test train.

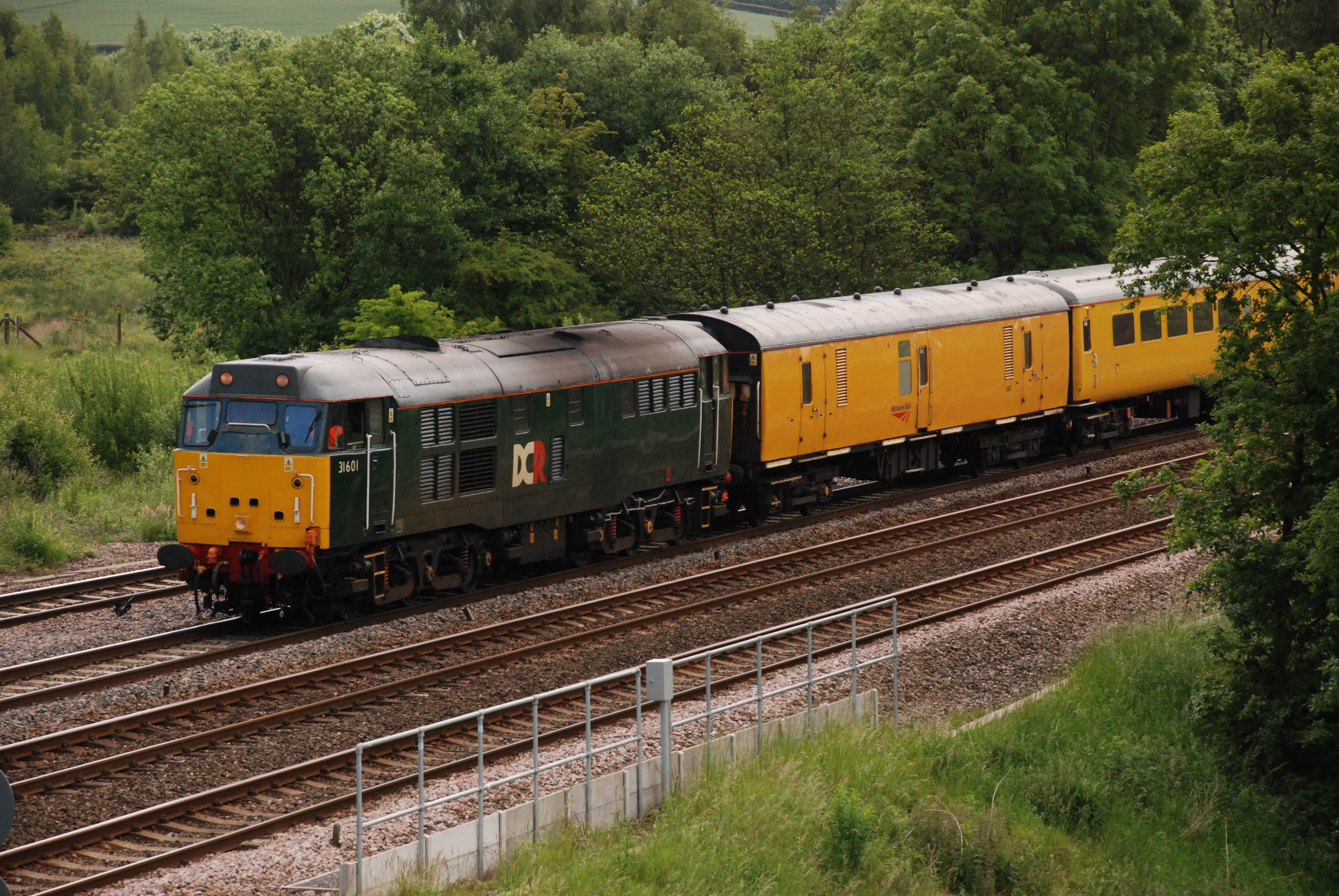
31601 in Devon and Cornwall Railways green livery, working a Network Rail test train south of Chesterfield

== Media ==
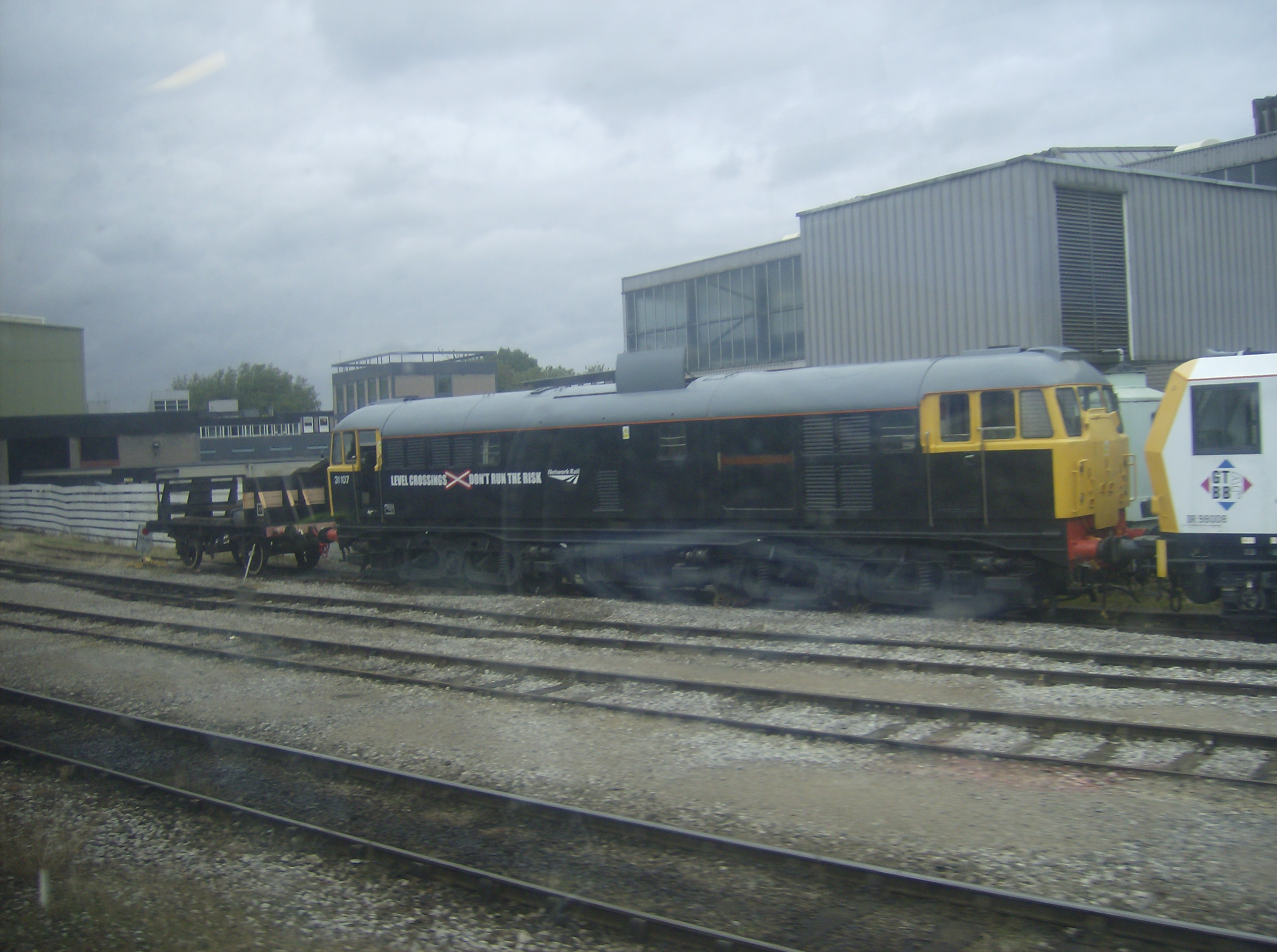
31107, seen here at RVEL Derby, was the locomotive used in the Top Gear crash.

On 21 August 2006, Network Rail and the BBC Television programme Top Gear staged and filmed a crash between a Class 31 locomotive (31107) and a family car in order to promote rail safety. The off-limits event was the first of its type for 10 years and took place at Hibaldstow level crossing near Scawby in Lincolnshire, where the B1206 road crosses the Barnetby–Gainsborough railway line. Two Class 31 locomotives and a parked Renault Espace were used during the crash. Network Rail's 31233 was used to propel 31107 up to a speed of 80 mph (130 km/h). Once the desired speed was reached, 31233 was detached and slowed down to a stop, while 31107 continued to coast at a speed of 70–80 miles per hour into the Espace, which was parked across the eastbound 'up' line. For the crash, locomotive 31107 received a special black livery with the slogan "Level crossings — Don't run the risk" along the side in white lettering. The final 5 minute segment was originally scheduled for 4 February 2007 but was rescheduled, apparently due to a fatal crossing crash at Dingwall two days earlier. It was eventually aired on BBC Two on 25 February 2007, shortly after the Grayrigg derailment. A repeat of the programme was pulled following a further level-crossing accident.

== Model railways ==
In 1962 Tri-ang launched its first version of the BR Class 30 (with headcode boxes) in OO gauge. Airfix model railways also chose to produce a Class 31 when Airfix entered the model train market in 1975. Lima also produced a OO scale model, in both "skinhead" and headcode box versions. Hornby have produced a finescale OO scale model since 2004; both body styles are available in various liveries. Hornby have also produced a basic representation of the prototype as part of their Railroad range in BR Blue, and BR Green whilst past examples have carried a variety of liveries. On 23 February 2022 Accurascale announced their own OO model, due out in 2023 which has also been joined by a range from Bachmann.

In the 1970s, Lima produced British N gauge models of the Class 31 in BR blue and BR green. In 2010, following Bachmann's acquisition of Graham Farish, the earlier Graham Farish Class 31 model was issued in BR green with a new chassis. In 2017, Graham Farish introduced a British N gauge model of the refurbished Class 31.

In 2013, Heljan introduced O gauge models of the Class 31 in BR blue and BR green liveries.

== References and sources ==
=== Sources ===
- Pritchard, Robert (2022). British Railways locomotives and coaching stock 2022. Sheffield: Platform 5. ISBN 978-1-909431-97-3.
- Stevens-Stratten, S.W.; Carter, R.S. (1978). British Rail Main-Line Diesels. Shepperton: Ian Allan Ltd. ISBN 978-0-7110-0617-1.
- Strickland, David C. (1983). Locomotive Directory: Every Single One There Has Ever Been. Camberley: Diesel and Electric Group. ISBN 978-0-906375-10-5. OCLC 16601890. OL 27959920M. Wikidata Q105978499.
- Toms, George (1978). Brush Diesel Locomotives, 1940-78. Sheffield: Turntable Publications. ISBN 978-0902844483. OCLC 11213057.
- Williams, Alan; Percival, David (1977). British Railways Locomotives and Multiple Units including Preserved Locomotives 1977. Shepperton: Ian Allan Ltd. ISBN 978-0-7110-0751-2.
