= Thornaby TMD =

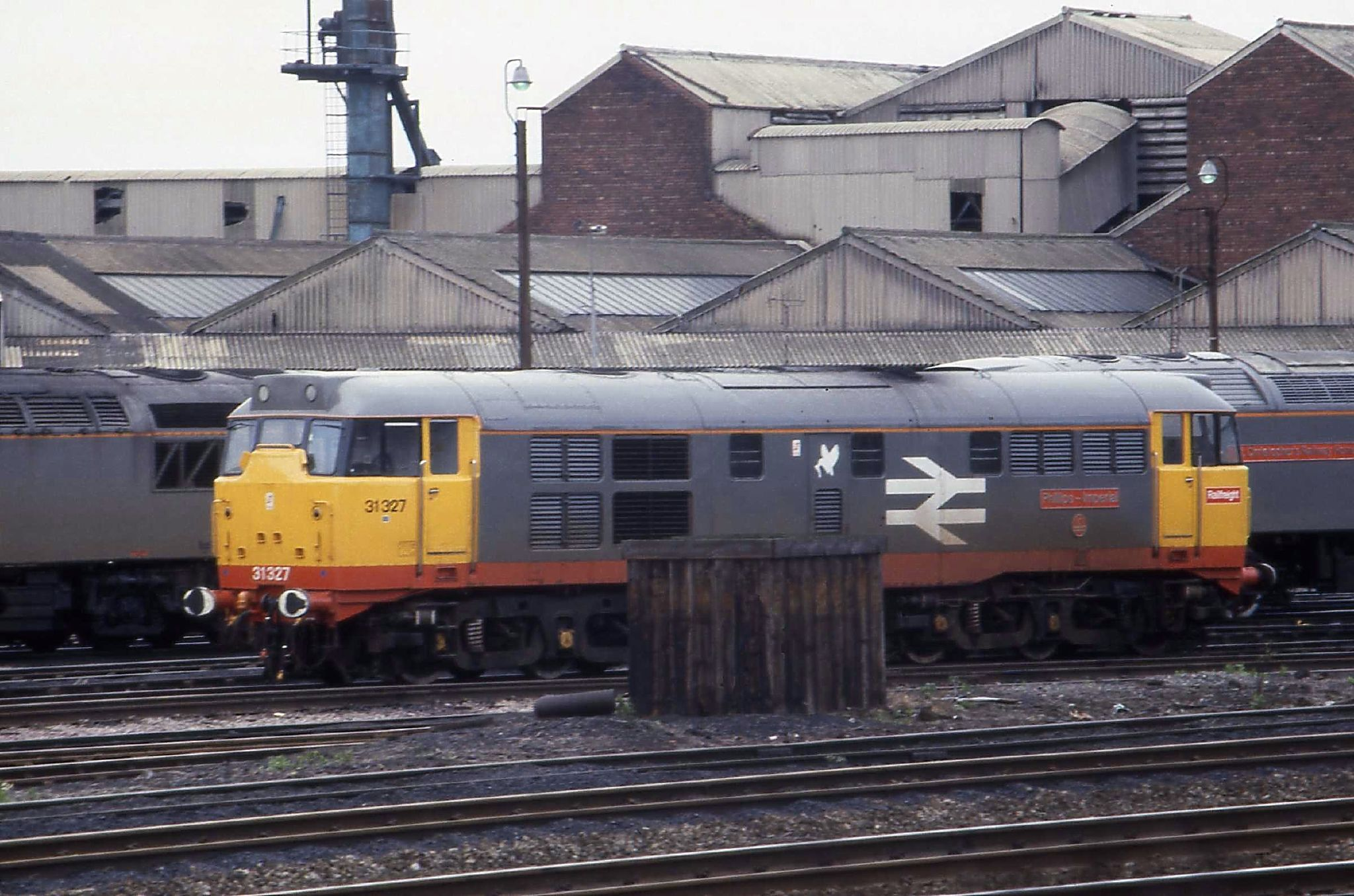
- British Rail Class 31 No.31327 awaits its next turn of duty at Thornaby TMD.
- Interactive map of Thornaby TMD

Location
- Location: Thornaby, United Kingdom
- Coordinates: 54.5600°N 1.289°W
- OS grid: NZ459185

Characteristics
- Owner: DB Schenker
- Depot code: 51L (1958-1973); TE (1973-2009)
- Type: Diesel

History
- Opened: 1958
- Closed: 2009

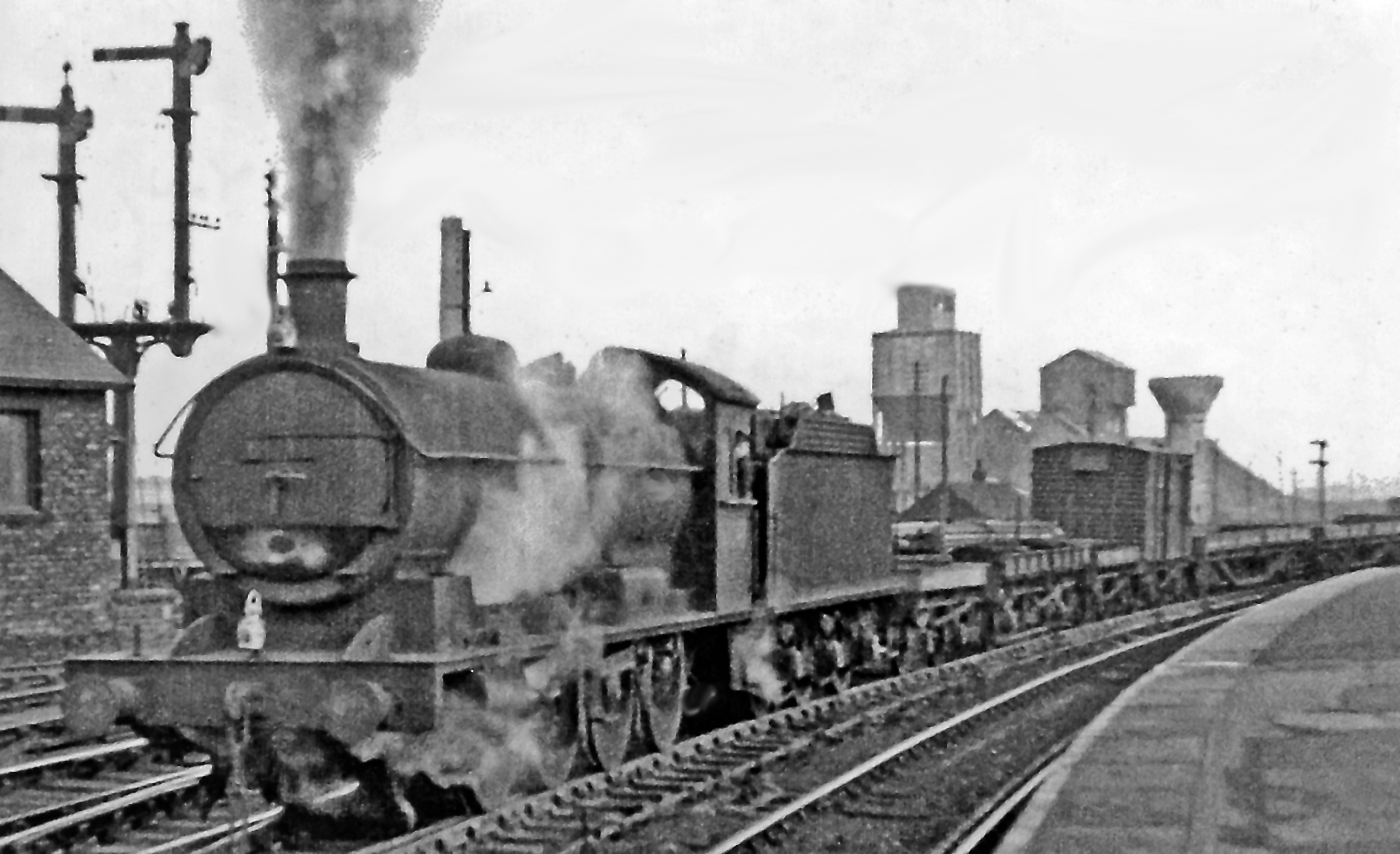
An ex-NER Class T2 0-8-0 No.63347 passes through Thornaby with a westward Class H train, consisting mainly of flat-wagons conveying steel slabs from Dorman Long. 28 March 1955, photo by Ben Brooksbank

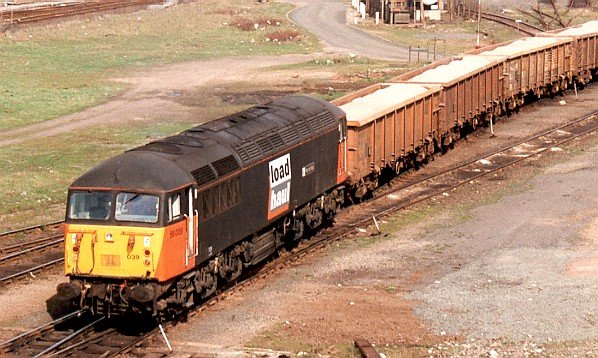
A British Rail Class 56 No.56039 in Loadhaul livery hauls a trainload of salt from Boulby into Tees Marshalling Yard, July 1998

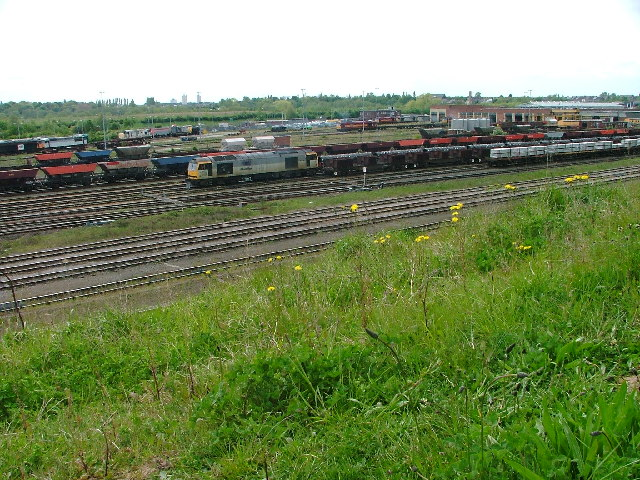
A Mainline-liveried British Rail Class 60 passes westwards through Thornaby with a steel stock service, May 2005. Thornaby TMD can be seen in the back of the picture

Thornaby TMD was a railway traction maintenance depot situated in Thornaby, England, latterly operated by DB Schenker. The depot was situated to the east of Thornaby, on the northern side of the line to Middlesbrough.

== Background ==
In the mid-1950s as part of British Railways modernisation plan, projects were developed to centralise the marshalling of goods wagons and the associated servicing of steam locomotives at the United Kingdom's largest freight hubs.

Teesside had a number of marshalling yards servicing the coal mines and steel mills of Consett, West County Durham and North Yorkshire, as well as those for Middlesbrough Dock. The decision was hence taken to rationalise these to one yard, Tees Marshalling Yard on part of the site of the once electrified Erimus Marshalling Yard.

== Steam history ==
Existing in the area were also four older steam sheds, which BR also planned to rationalise and close:

- North of the River Tees:
  - Stockton (51E)
  - Haverton Hill (51G) near Port Clarence and the Tees Transporter Bridge
- South of the River Tees:
  - Newport (51B) next to the once electrified Erimus marshalling yard
  - Middlesbrough (51D) located just east of the station

BR began construction in 1957, building its last roundhouse for steam locomotives. Developed on a 70 acres (28 ha) site for the shed and its associated facilities alone, it was equipped with:

- 300 feet (91 m) diameter octagonal roundhouse, containing 22 covered sidings accessed via a 70 feet (21 m) turntable
- A running shed with covered preparation sheds and wet ash pits
- A repair shed with two wheeldrops, a blacksmith, coppersmith and machine shop
- A 350 tonnes (390 tons) mechanised coaling plant, capable of fuelling four locomotives simultaneously
- A 200,000 imperial gallons (910,000 L; 240,000 US gal) water tank with 15 distribution points, and a second 70 feet (21 m) turntable

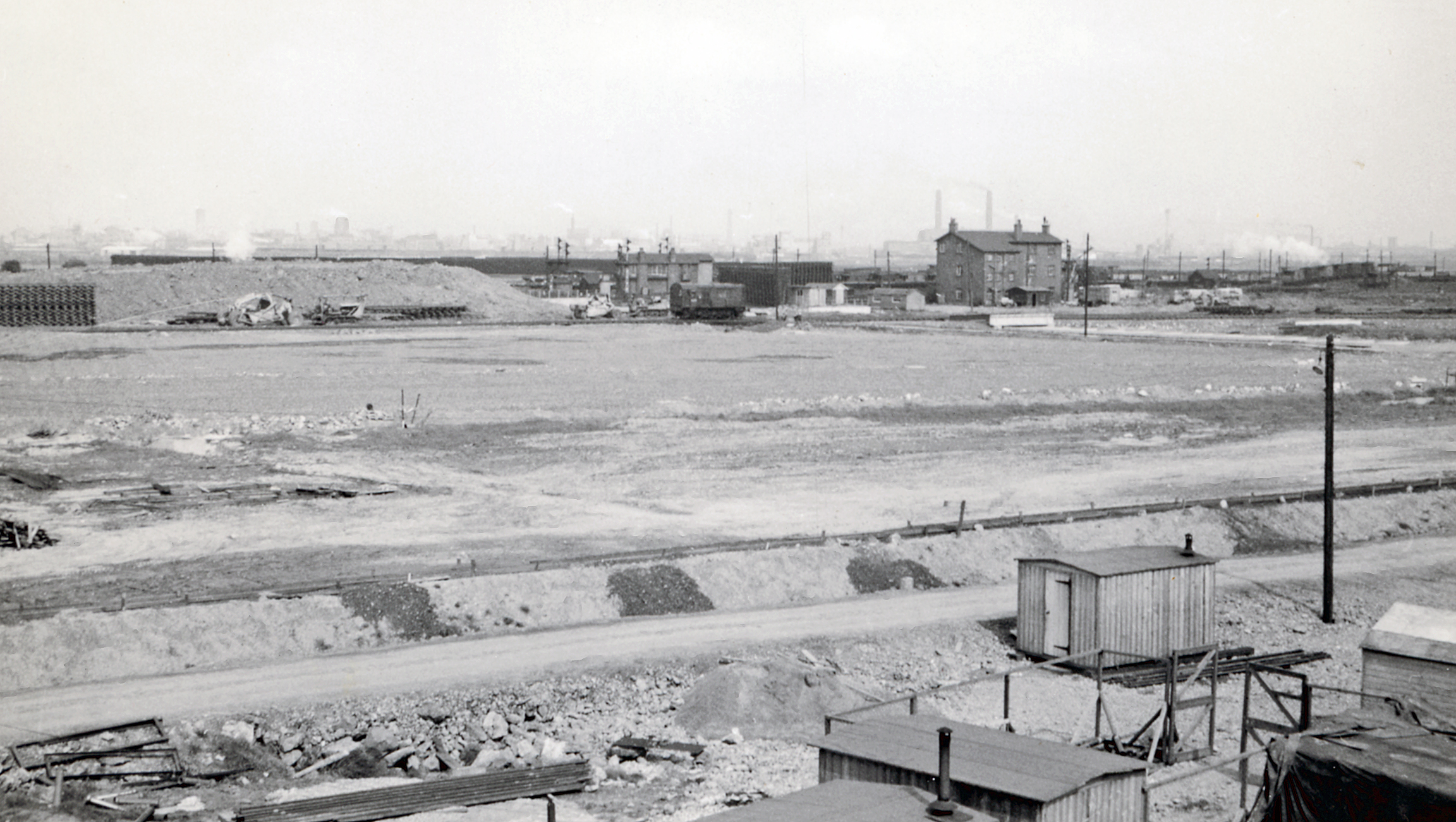
Thornaby Tees Yard under construction

All the structures were made from pre-stressed and pre-formed concrete pieces, and when the shed opened in June 1958 with shed code (51L), the total construction had been completed for £1.25million.

On opening, the shed initially took over the allocations at Newport (depot code 51B) and Middlesbrough (51D). In June 1959 the depots at Stockton (51E) and Haverton Hill (51G) were closed and the bulk of their locomotives added to Thornaby's allocation. At this time the depot had the largest allocation of any single depot in the country, although Stratford (30A) had a larger allocation but shared with 6 sub-sheds. The depot was closed to steam in December 1964.

== TOPS history ==
Under TOPS, the depot code was TE. The logo applied to the sides of Thornaby locomotives was a white Kingfisher.

Apart from the ubiquitous Class 08 shunter, early diesel allocations included members of Class 03, Class 04, Class 17, Class 25 (from the first batch built at Darlington), Class 27 and Class 37.

== DB Schenker ==
In the later years prior to closure, Thornaby TMD was home to Class 08/09, Class 37, Class 56, Class 60 and Class 66's. Following closure, the depot was used to store Class 08/09 and a number of Class 56s which fell victim to metal thefts. These were all removed and sent for scrap prior to demolition works commencing.

The buildings were demolished between May and July 2011.
