= Ealing Community Transport =

Social enterprise in England

- Founded: 1979
- Service area: Greater London
- Service type: Bus
- Routes: 1
- Fleet: Dennis Dart SLF

Ealing Community Transport (ECT) is a London social enterprise which provides community transport in the Ealing, Milton Keynes, and Dorset areas. In the past it has also operated in the national rail industry. In 2008 the Group experienced severe trading difficulties which led to a team of corporate finance and restructuring experts from TLT Solicitors advising the ECT Group on a three phase restructuring including the refinancing of the business, the share sale of the recycling division and the share sale of its rail business. The 24 companies in the Group turning over more than £70million and employing 1,100 were reduced to just eight, focused solely on transport.

The £15.5 million sale of £47 million turnover business 'ECT Recycling' to AIM listed maintenance services contractor May Gurney and the share sale of ECT's rail business to British American Railway Services, a subsidiary of American rail operator Iowa Pacific Holdings, LLC (for an undisclosed sum), meant that the ECT Group returned to its Community Transport roots.

== Recycling ==
In early 1995 ECT started its first green box recycling service, using a carton roughly the size of a milk crate, into which paper, glass, cans, foil, textiles, shoes, household batteries and engine oil can be placed, collected once a week by ECT. Materials are sorted into compartments on the recycling vehicle at the kerbside to avoid contamination and mix-up of items. This recycle from home service is now used by 860,000 people in sixteen local authority areas, across parts of London, Avon, Somerset, Warwickshire and the West Midlands.

As well as doorstep green box recycling, ECT also runs flat recycling services, whereby a block of between 25 and 125 households has several recycling containers between them, and depots. These depots collect all the materials collected by the doorstep recycling service as well as items such as books, electrical items, fluorescent tubes, fridges, furniture, green waste, plastic waste, scrap metal, tyres, white goods, paint and wood.

ECT has developed into a company with an annual turnover of around £50million pounds, with 600 staff working in its recycling, community transport, engineering and refuse collection.

== Bus operations ==
Ealing Community Transport was established in the 1970s to serve the small towns on the outskirts of Ealing. Due to a lack of revenue the service was shut down in the late 1990s.

During the early 2000s it decreased its frequency to 15 minutes. ECT also experienced problems with vandalism and arson attacks on its buses, and came third from last in the best contractor survey. Initial problems with window etching were quickly addressed and ECT Bus was involved in Operation Eyesore in west London, in conjunction with the Metropolitan Police and TfL, where front-page images on local papers identified local vandals, leading to a number of convictions. Performance of the route was exemplary in terms of operated mileage (before traffic causes) and, despite operating through Southall, an area renowned for its challenging traffic environment, reliability was extremely good - at April 2006, ECT Bus was in second position in TfL's league table for smaller operators. The bus fleet for the 195 contract stood at 14 vehicles.

From 14 March 2009 ECT stopped trading as a bus operator and its sole route is now being run by First London on a temporary contract.

=== Garage ===
ECT operated one garage in Greenford, which used to run London Buses route 195. The Greenford bus depot is part of a local council depot and was first used in 1993 as a midibus base. The opening of Greenford garage led to the closure of Hanwell, and in 1995 the garage was operating 110 midibuses. The standard vehicles in the late 1990s were midibuses by Renault/Wright and Marshall but unfortunately both types had a bad reputation and did not last long. In later years the allocation was much more diverse, ranging from Marshall-bodied Darts to Dennis Trident 2/Plaxton vehicles. In late 2003 Ealing Community Transport moved into the depot with their first London route - 195, using garage code EY.

The service uses the Dennis Dart SLF 10.2m/Caetano Nimbus.

== Rail operations ==
ECT entered the railway rolling stock hire and maintenance market, owning hire companies RT Rail and Mainline Rail and also RMS Locotec of Wakefield. ECT also operated two heritage railways: the Dartmoor Railway at Okehampton in Devon and the Weardale Railway in County Durham.

By 2008, the company was pulling out of this area of activity. Mainline Rail ceased to trade, and the Dartmoor Railway was suspended on 18 April 2008 (although services have since been resumed), while ECT was seeking a buyer for its stake in the Weardale line.

== See also ==
- List of bus operators of the United Kingdom
