= FM Rail =

British railway charter company

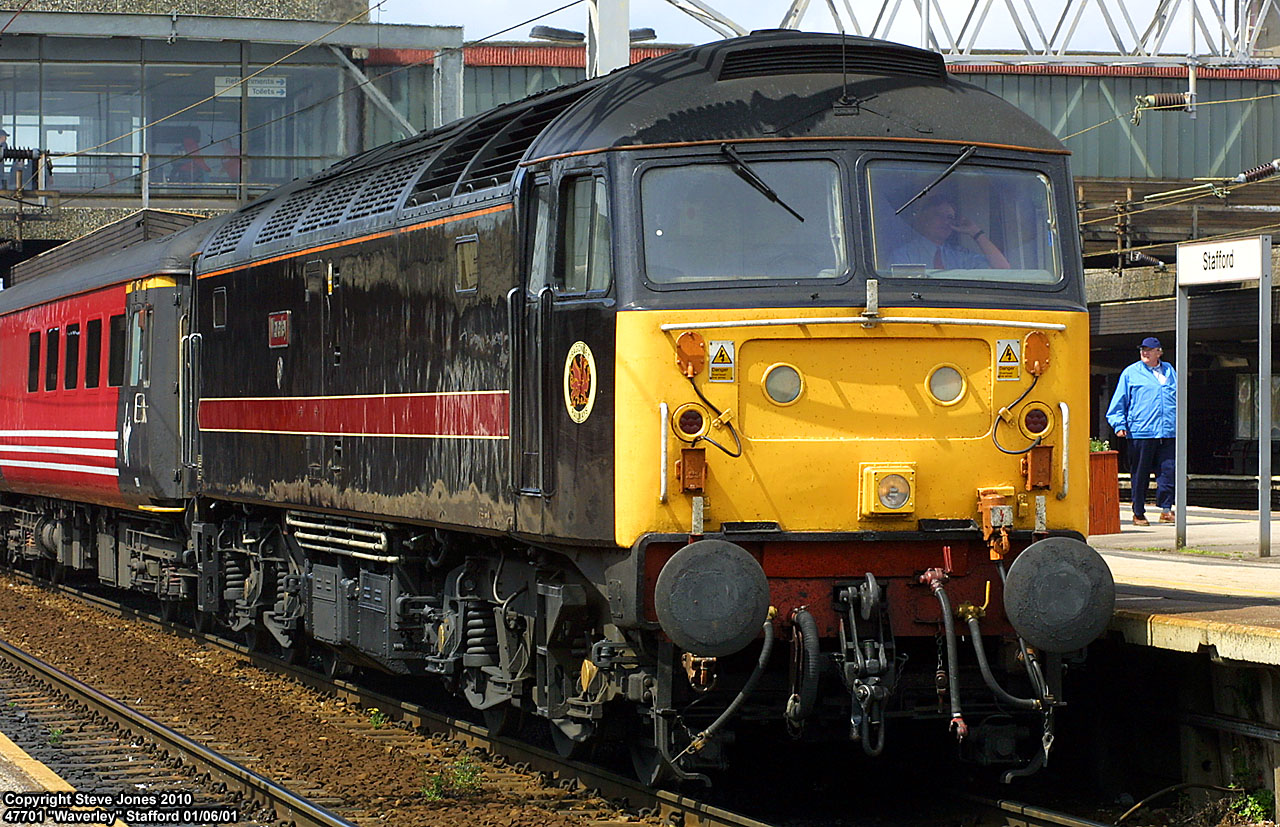
- 47701 "Waverley" at Stafford
- Predecessor: Fragonset; Merlin Rail
- Founded: September 1997
- Founder: Mark Sargent
- Defunct: December 2006
- Headquarters: Derby
- Area served: United Kingdom
- Services: Freight operating company

FM Rail was a railway charter company based in Derby, England. The company was formed when spot hire company Fragonset Railways and charter operator Merlin Rail merged. It went into administration in 2006.

== History ==
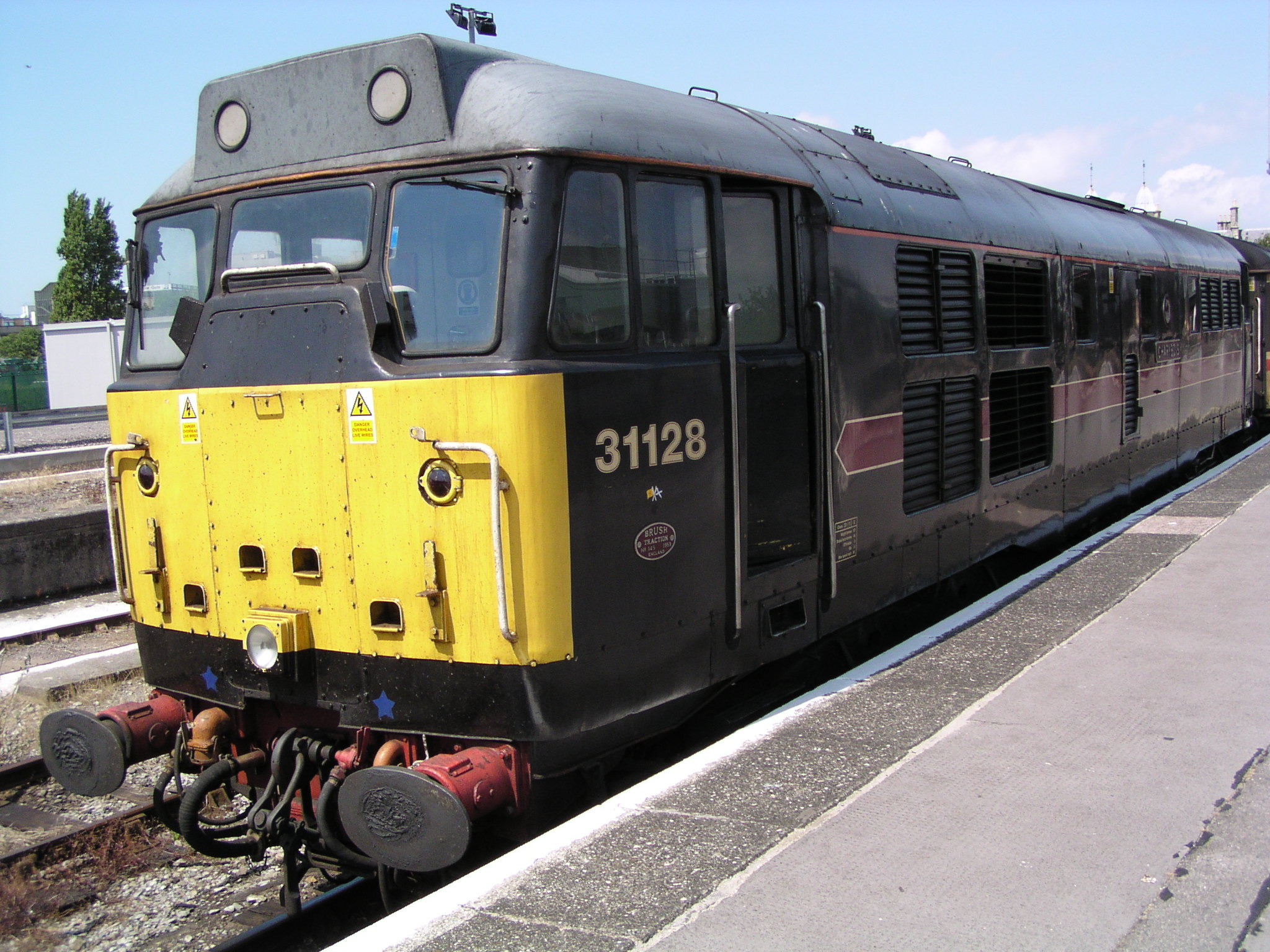
31128 Charybdis at Bristol Temple Meads in July 2004

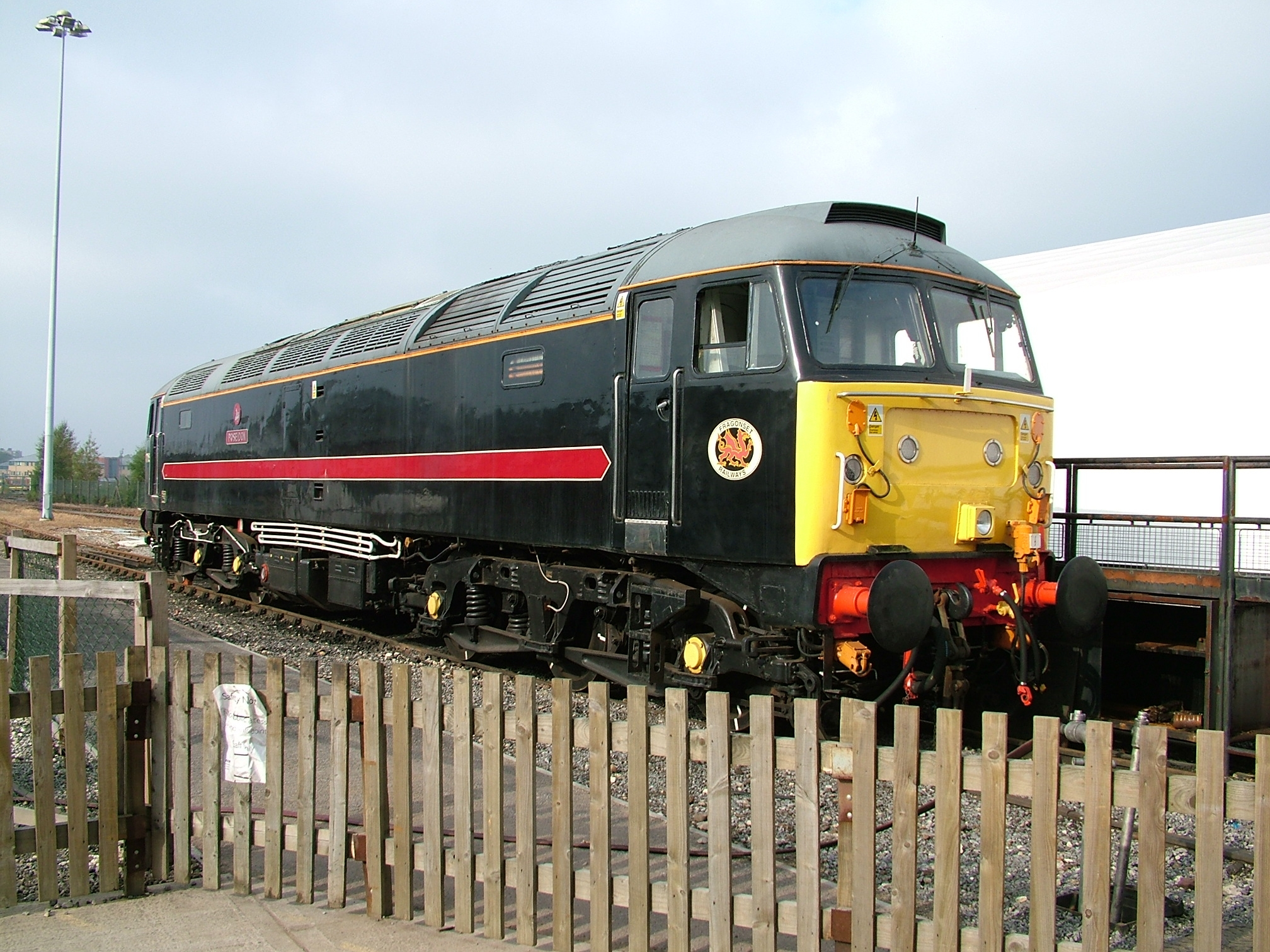
47715 at the National Railway Museum, York in October 2005

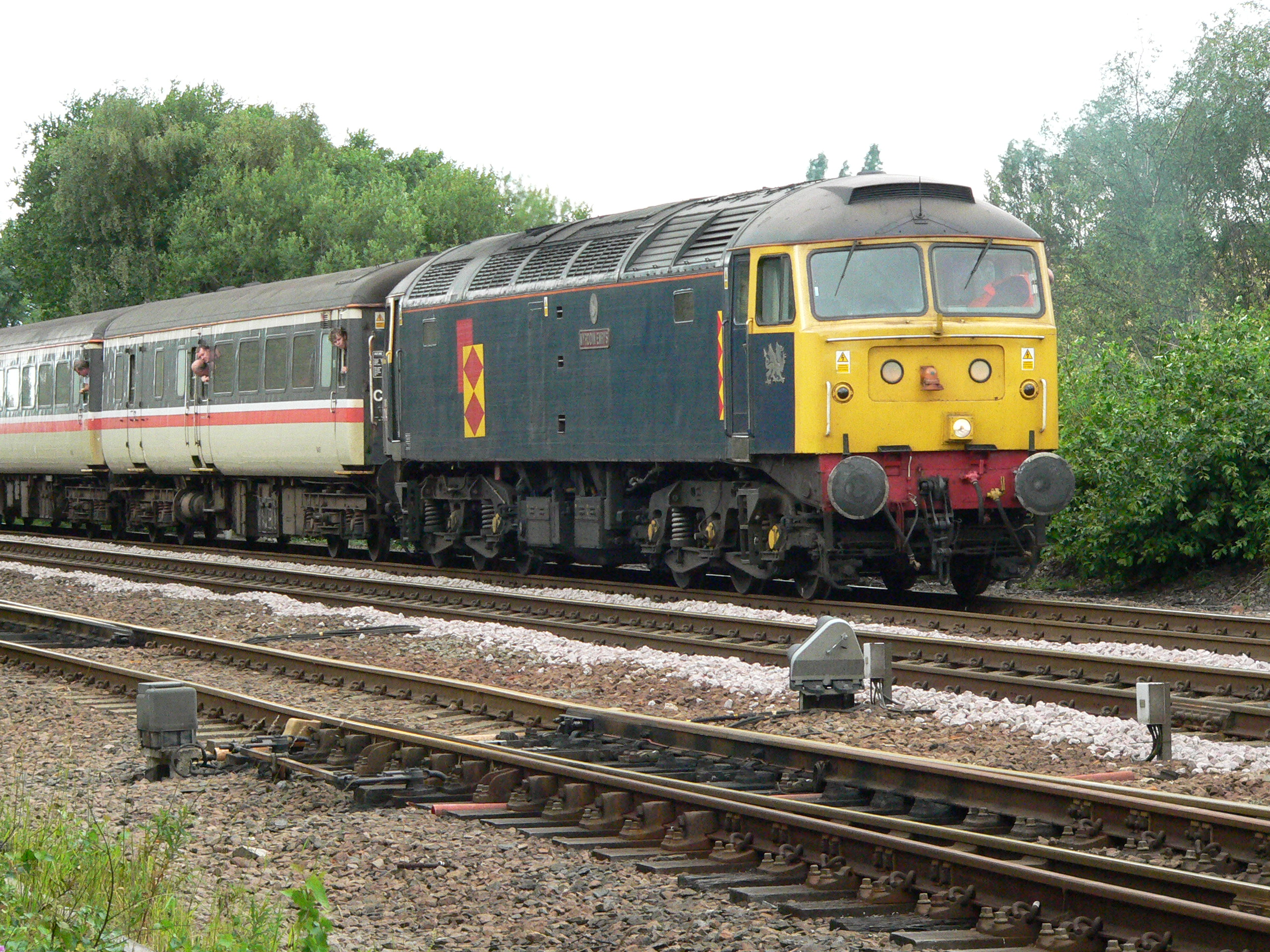
47145 at Barrow Hill in July 2006

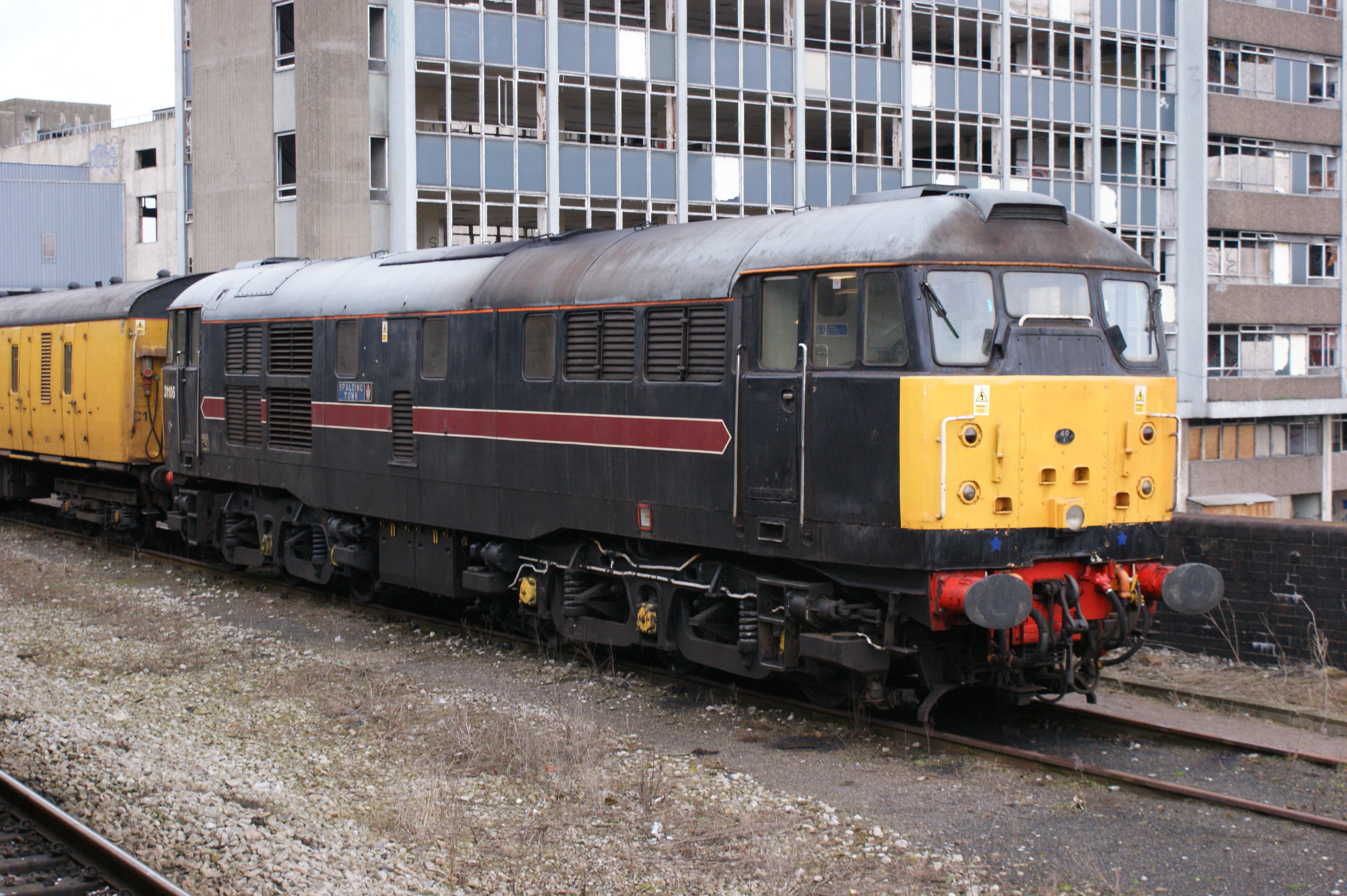
31106 at Bristol Temple Meads in March 2009

=== Fragonset Railways ===
Fragonset Railways was formed in 1997 as a spot hire company when four Class 47/7 locomotives were purchased from Waterman Railways with the operation initially based at the Tyseley Locomotive Works. In November 1997, Fragonset commenced its first contract providing locomotives for Virgin CrossCountry. A further Class 47/7 owned by the Lear family was also managed. A permanent base was established at the Railway Technical Centre, Derby. The locomotives were repainted into a new livery of black with a broad maroon mid-bodyside stripe.

In 1998, Fragonset purchased several redundant Class 31 locomotives from EWS. The first of these, 31452, was quickly repaired at the company's base at Tyseley Locomotive Works. A further four Class 31s quickly followed. They were initially employed on Silverlink services on the Marston Vale Line, operating in top and tail mode with two carriages. The use of the Class 31s continued until 1999, when Class 150/1 diesel multiple units replaced them. Following this, the Class 31 fleet was employed on a variety of duties, including hire to WAGN to haul electrical multiple units between depots for maintenance.

Fragonset would go on to purchase many redundant locomotives from EWS, mainly of classes 31, 33, 47 and 73. By 2002 it had purchased 75.

First Great Western, Midland Mainline and Virgin CrossCountry all hired Class 47s. Wessex Trains hired Class 31s to haul passenger services from Bristol-Weymouth and Bristol-Brighton with 31601 repainted into Wessex Trains pink livery. First North Western hired Class 31s to work Blackpool-Manchester-Chester services.

Railtrack hired 31190 and 31601 to haul test trains. Both locomotives were repainted into Railtrack's blue and lime green livery. Network Rail (Railtrack's successor) purchased its own fleet of 31s, so no longer required the Fragonset locomotives. First GBRf hired Class 73s to supplement its own fleet.

South West Trains hired Class 33s and 73s to act as Thunderbird rescue locomotives. West Coast Railways hired 31190, repainted into Royal Scotsman maroon livery.

Some locomotives, notably 47355 and 73107, were repainted into a freight livery of all-over black with large Fragonset lettering.

=== Merlin Rail ===
Merlin received its train operating licence in July 2002. It was originally very decentralised, considering itself to be a "virtual company" operating over the internet with no central office, although the control office was initially in Maidstone, Kent. As the business grew the need for a central location became apparent and offices at Wyvern House, by Derby station, were rented from mid-2003.

Merlin saw itself as an operator of specialist, individually planned trains, and felt that such trains were not the core activity for conventional train operating companies and therefore did not always enjoy the best of operational and organisational arrangements. Merlin believed that a dedicated specialist train operator in this niche market could provide a high quality total service for all potential clients requiring individually planned trains.

Merlin was the first train operator to receive approval through the stringent Railway (Safety Case) Regulations, 2000, and held one of the widest railway safety cases, allowing full geographic coverage of the network with all classes and types of conventional locomotives, passenger rolling stock and loaded and unloaded freight vehicles. It was specifically authorised to operate new, unusual and novel vehicles.

=== FM Rail ===
In January 2005, Fragonset and Merlin merged to form FM Rail. In August 2005, the business of Hertfordshire Rail Tours was purchased.

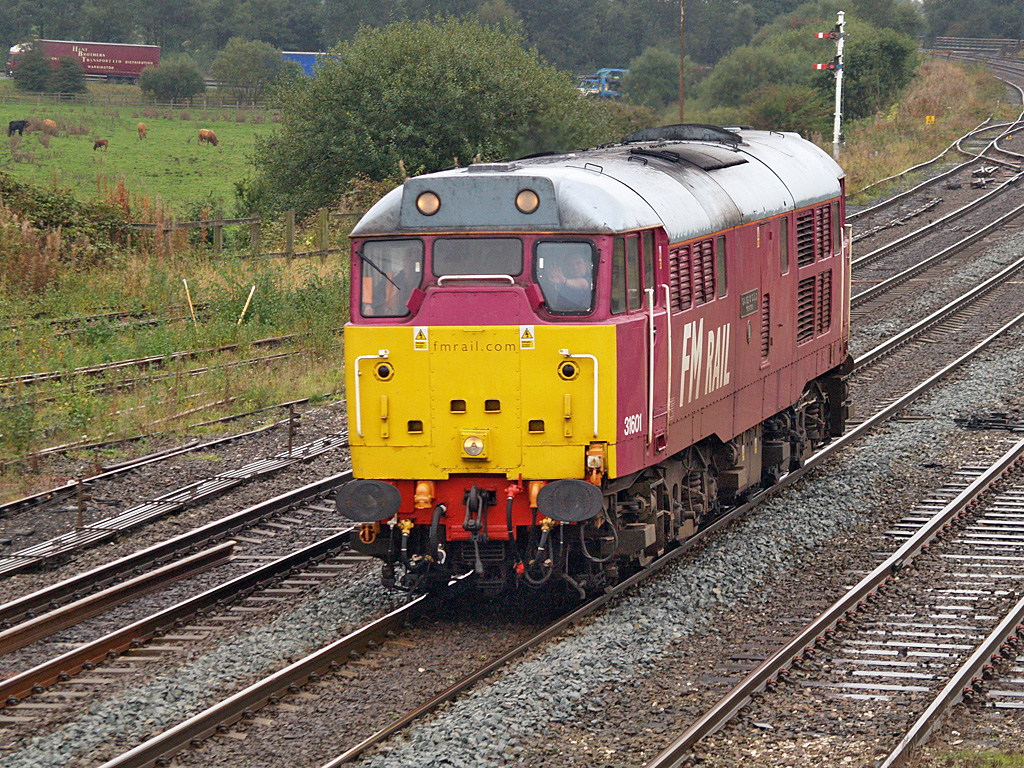
Class 31 at Castleton East Junction

FM Rail launched its new livery in September 2005, when 47832 was repainted for a Crewe Works open day.

In January 2006, the Blue Pullman was launched, and two Class 47 locomotives were repainted into a Nanking blue livery to match the coaching stock. In 2006, FM Rail purchased the assets of Pathfinder Tours, another railtour operator, in conjunction with Riviera Trains.

In February 2006, FM Rail operated its first freight service on behalf of Fastline between Doncaster and York.

In 2006, FM Rail concluded a deal to lease the former depot site at Coalville in Leicestershire. It was planned to move most of its withdrawn stock there to reduce costs. Other locomotives were disposed of once they had yielded spare parts.

== Administration ==
In December 2006, Begbies Traynor was appointed as administrator of FM Rail.

The administrator sold the Fragonset Railways Maintenance business to Rail Vehicle Engineering Limited (RVEL), a company founded by former FM Rail managing director Andy Lynch; this business has since been sold to Loram and rebranded as Loram UK. The Merlin Rail train operating licence and railtour operator Hertfordshire Rail Tours was sold to Victa Westlink Rail, which later itself also went into administration, the majority of which was then absorbed by Stobart Rail.

The business affairs were not resolved until June 2013, when unsecured creditors received payments of 2p in the £.
