= British Rail Class 418 =

Class of British electric multiple unit

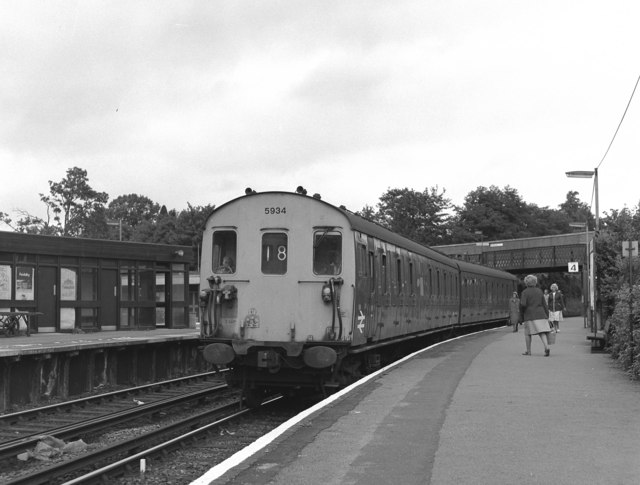
- 5934 at Virginia Water in 1979
- In service: 1969-1970, 1974-1980, 1982-1983
- Manufacturer: BR Eastleigh
- Number built: 63 units converted from 2-HAP
- Formation: DMBSO - DTS
- Operators: British Rail
- Lines served: Southern Region

Specifications
- Car body construction: Steel
- Train length: 132 ft 8 1/2 in (40.450 m)
- Car length: 63 ft 11 1/2 in (19.495 m)
- Width: 9 ft 3 in (2.819 m)
- Height: 12 ft 8 in (3.86 m) (overall)
- Entry: 3 ft 9 in (1.14 m)
- Doors: Slam
- Wheelbase: 46 ft 6 in (14.17 m) (bogie centres); 8 ft 9 in (2.67 m) (motor bogie); 8 ft 6 in (2.59 m) (others)
- Maximum speed: 90 mph (140 km/h)
- Weight: 42 t (41 long tons; 46 short tons) (DMBSO); 32.5 t (32.0 long tons; 35.8 short tons) (DTS)
- Traction motors: 2 × EE507
- Power output: 2 x 250 hp (190 kW); 500 hp (370 kW)
- HVAC: Electric
- Electric system(s): 750 V DC third rail
- Current collection: Contact shoe
- UIC classification: Bo′2′+2′2′
- Bogies: Commonwealth (inner), Mk4 (outer)
- Braking system(s): Air (EP/Auto)
- Coupling system: Buckeye (outer); 3 link (inner)
- Multiple working: 1951, 1957, 1963, 1966 SR Emus
- Track gauge: 1,435 mm (4 ft 8 1/2 in) standard gauge

British Rail Class 418 (or 2-SAP) was a class of electrical multiple unit commissioned by British Railways Southern Region in England. The units were formed by declassifying the first class accommodation in selected 2-HAP units. They were employed mainly on semi-fast suburban routes such as the South West Main Line as far as Weybridge, Waterloo to Reading Line, Staines to Windsor Line and Hounslow Loop Line.

== Class 418/0 ==
14 units were converted from Bulleid design 2-HAP units in 1969. First class was restored in 1970 and they regained their former identities. They would have become class 418/0 under TOPS but reverted to class 414 before being reclassified.

== Class 418/1 ==
40 2-SAP units numbered 5901-5940 were converted from 2-HAP units (in the 6001-6042 range, not numbered consecutively) between March and May 1974. First class was restored between February and July 1980 and they regained their former identities, with the exception of unit 5917 which was scrapped in 1978 following a collision. Many were incorporated into 4-CAP units.

2-HAP unit 6039 (previously 2-SAP unit 5937) was converted back into a 2-SAP, this time numbered 5939 (the second 2-SAP unit to carry that number, the previous being 2-HAP 6041) in June 1982. It was withdrawn in April 1983 and scrapped.

== Class 418/2 ==
2-HAP units 6043 and 6044 were converted to 2-SAP units 5941 and 5942 in April 1974. They were followed by 2-HAP units 6045 to 6053 converted to 2-SAP units 5943 to 5951 respectively in May 1977. 5951 was converted back to a 2-HAP in October 1977 and the remainder converted back between February and April 1980. All regained their original identities. Many were incorporated into 4-CAP units.
