= British Rail Class 73 =

British class of bi-mode locomotives

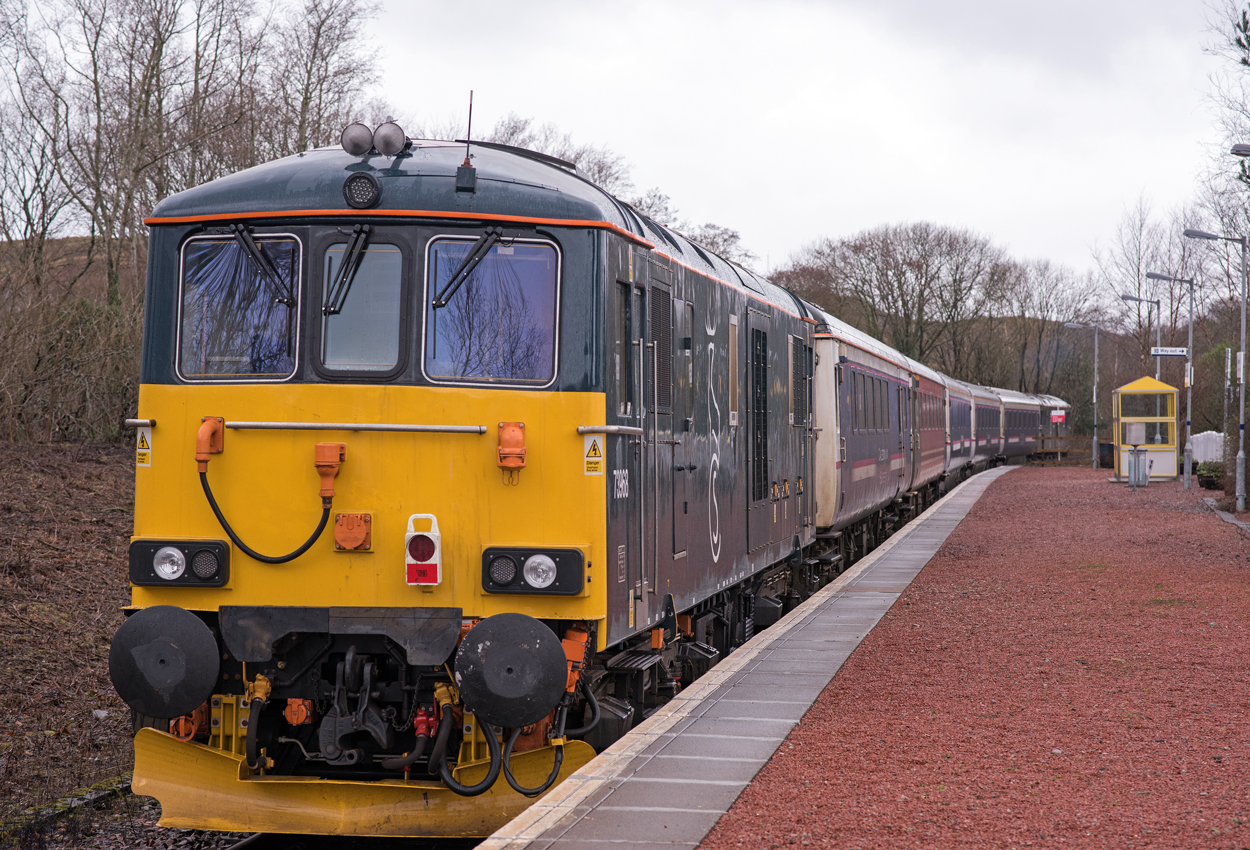
- A GB Railfreight Class 73/9 at Connel Ferry in 2016
Type and origin
- Power type: Bi-mode (electro-diesel)
- Builder: 73/0: British Railways at Eastleigh Works, 73/1: English Electric at Vulcan Foundry
- Build date: 73/0: 1962, 73/1: 1965–1967
- Total produced: 49
Specifications
- Configuration
  - AAR: B-B
  - UIC: Bo'Bo'
  - Commonwealth: Bo-Bo
- Gauge: 4 ft 8 1/2 in (1,435 mm) standard gauge
- Wheel diameter: 3 ft 4 in (1,016 mm)
- Length: 16.36 m (53 ft 8 in)
- Loco weight: 73/0: 76.3 long tons (77.5 t; 85.5 short tons); 73/1: 76.8 long tons (78.0 t; 86.0 short tons)
- Electric system/s: 650–750 V DC Third rail
- Current pickup: Contact shoe
- Prime mover: English Electric 4SRKT Mk II; 2 × Cummins QSK19 (73951-2); MTU 8V 4000 R43L (73961-971)
- Traction motors: 73/0: EE 542A, 73/1: EE 546/1B
- MU working: 73/9: AAR system, (59, 66, 67, 68008-015, 69, 70 and 73/9)
- Train heating: Electric Train Heating
- Train brakes: Vacuum, Air and Electropneumatic
Performance figures
- Maximum speed: 73/0: 80 mph (129 km/h); 73/1: 90 mph (145 km/h)
- Power output: Electric (continuous): 1,420 hp (1,059 kW); Electric (one-hour): 1,600 hp (1,193 kW); Engine: 600 hp (447 kW); 73/9: 1,600 hp (1,193 kW)
- Tractive effort: 73/0 (electric): 42,000 lbf (186.8 kN); 73/0 (diesel): 34,100 lbf (151.7 kN); 73/1 (electric): 40,000 lbf (177.9 kN); 73/1 (diesel): 36,000 lbf (160.1 kN)
Career
- Operators: British Rail, GB Railfreight, Network Rail, Southern, South Western Railway
- Numbers: E6001–E6049, later 73001–73006, 73101–73142
- Axle load class: Route availability 6
- Withdrawn: 1972 (1), 1982 (1), 1991–present
- Disposition: 6 preserved, 27 still in service, 6 stored, 10 scrapped

The British Rail Class 73 is a class of electro-diesel locomotives. This type is unusual in that it can operate on the Southern Region's 650/750 V DC third rail power supply, or an onboard diesel engine to allow it to be used on non-electrified routes. This makes it very versatile, although the diesel engine produces less power than is available from the third-rail power supply, so the locomotives are rarely used outside of the former Southern Region of British Rail. It is one of the first bi-mode locomotives ever built. Following the withdrawal and scrapping of the more powerful Class 74 bi-mode locomotives in 1977, the Class 73 was unique on the British railway network until the introduction of the Class 88 bi-mode locomotives in 2017. Ten locomotives have been scrapped.

== History ==
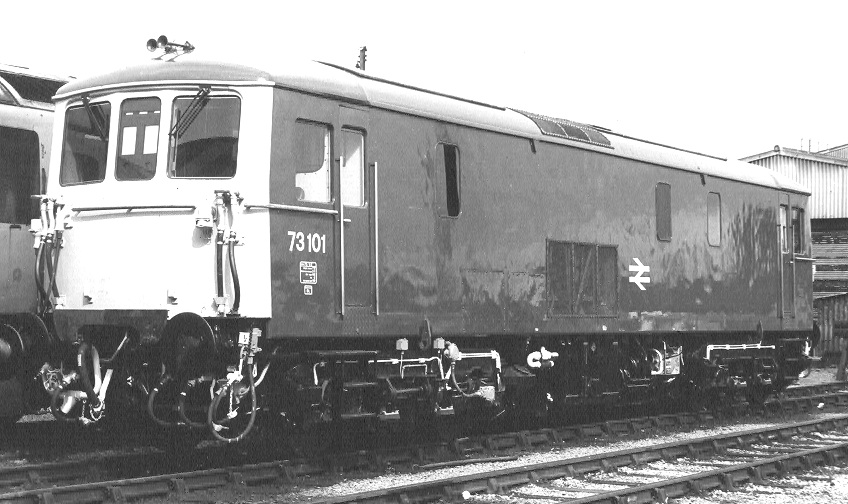
Class 73/1 73101 in BR blue livery

The Southern Railway's expanding third rail electric passenger network (which had begun as far back as 1915) was until 1941 a purely passenger electric multiple unit (EMU) system. This was because it was necessary to have gaps in the third rail for level crossings, etc., which effectively prevented the use of electric locomotives on either passenger or freight. The problem was solved when Oliver Bulleid became Chief Mechanical Engineer in 1937 and began work with Chief Electrical Engineer Alfred Raworth. To overcome the problem of gaps in the third rail three experimental locomotives were built (which later became the British Rail Class 70) which were fitted with large flywheels that maintained momentum long enough to avoid stalling in gaps. The second problem for freight train operation by electric locomotives was the serious hazard that would result if the 750 V DC third rail was laid in goods yards, as this would be a danger to personnel on the ground and also present some complex issues loading and unloading many types of freight wagons. The initial solution was to install simple tramway-type overhead wires to carry the 750 V supply in certain yards and add a pantograph on the locomotive roofs.

As a continuation of the Southern Railway's policy of electrification, British Railways then began electrifying the main lines to the Kent Coast as part of the 1955 Modernisation Plan. In addition to the few hundred new EMUs required, a small fleet of 24 Bo-Bo electric locomotives of 2,552 hp (1,903 kW) classed type "HA" (later Class 71) were built to deal with freight, parcels, and the few remaining locomotive-hauled passenger trains in Kent, such as the "Night Ferry" and "Golden Arrow" services. These locomotives also had a flywheel and pantograph, and were able to work in the more important freight yards across Kent that were fitted with the simple 750 V overhead wire system. This system was brought into use across Kent between 1959 and 1961.

Although successful this system did require considerable extra cost, and maintenance, and still limited freight operations with the new locomotives to those goods yards fitted with the catenary. Something more versatile was needed. Development and advances in both electric locomotive and diesel engine design in the early 1960s resulted in the Southern Region engineers beginning to consider the possibility of a combined electric and diesel locomotive. The requirement was for an electric locomotive with a similar power when using the electrified third rail to the already successful Type 3 Birmingham Railway Carriage and Wagon (BRCW) built diesel locomotives (later Class 33) then entering service on the Southern. This would be supported by adding a small diesel engine powerful enough to move reasonable freight loads at slow speed within goods yards. The new locomotive design would also need retractable third rail pick up shoes. This was for two reasons: the first was safety in connection with track relaying jobs, avoiding the problem of bridging a gap and energising a dead section of third rail, and electrocuting track workers who might be in contact with the dead third rail section. The second was to allow locomotives under diesel power to move off and back onto third rail areas without risk of damaging "fixed" third rail pick up shoes.

The Southern Region engineers, having done all the initial design work, set about building a prototype batch of six new "electro-diesel" locomotives at Eastleigh Carriage and Wagon Works during 1961–1962. The new locomotives had a respectable 1,600 hp (1,200 kW) on electric power, and an English Electric 600 hp (450 kW) diesel engine similar to those used in the Southern Region's diesel electric multiple Unit (DEMU) fleet. To improve versatility yet further, the locomotives were designed so that they could work in multiple with most of the Southern's electric and diesel multiple unit fleets as well as normal carriages and wagons. This meant the locomotives had to also be fitted with drop buckeye couplings and therefore the Pullman rubbing bar, and retractable buffers. The success of these prototype locomotives resulted in British Railways ordering a production batch of a further 43 locomotives from English Electric at the Vulcan Foundry in Newton-le-Willows. However minor technical differences prevented the prototypes (classified type "JA") working in multiple with the production examples (classified type "JB"). In all other respects, the new "electro-diesels" proved extremely versatile, to the point where many are still in service after a life of over 64 years.

== Accidents and incidents ==
- On 26 April 1968, locomotive E6023 was derailed at Earley, Berkshire when a set of points were moved by mistake.
- On 8 January 1972, locomotive E6027 collided with 4-BEP no 7004 at Horsham, injuring 15.
- On 12 October 1972, locomotive E6001 was hauling a freight train that ran into the rear of a passenger train at Wimbledon, London due to inattentiveness on the part of the driver. Twelve people were injured.
- On 16 January 1982, 73 115 was hauling a departmental train which overran signals and ran into the rear of a parcels train at East Croydon. The severely damaged locomotive was withdrawn and subsequently scrapped. Locomotive 73 006 was hauling the parcels train that was run into.

== Description ==
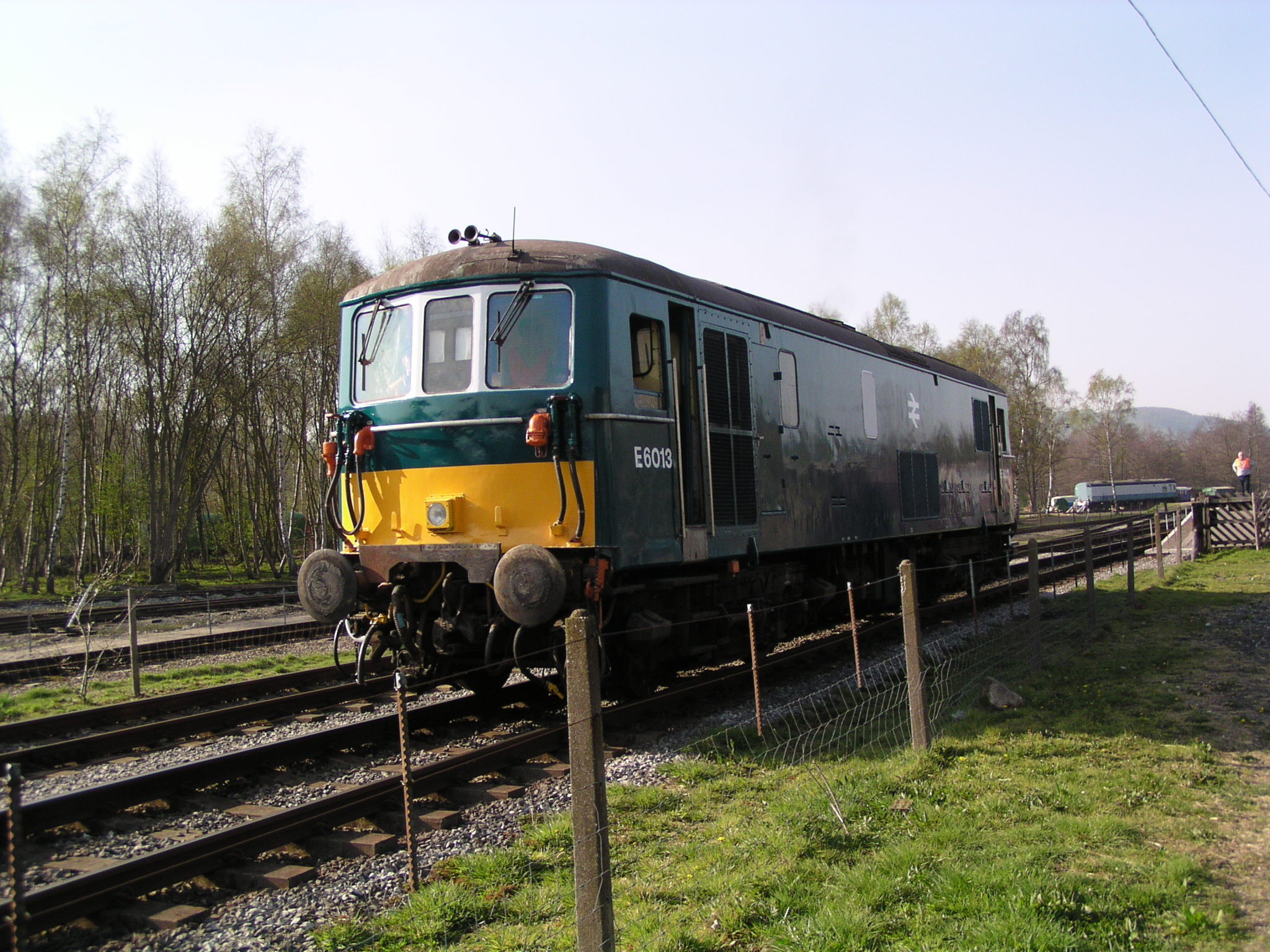
Class 73 no. E6013 (73107) at Rowsley South, on the Peak Railway in 2003. This locomotive was on loan from Fragonset Railways and has since returned to main-line service.

This class of 49 locomotives were built in two batches using English Electric components. The first six locomotives were built by BR at Eastleigh Carriage and Wagon Works and introduced to service during 1962; they were built to the Hastings Line gauge, numbered E6001-E6006 and classified as type JA. With the introduction of TOPS in 1968 they were to have been classified as Class 72, to differentiate from the later built units. However, instead they became Class 73/0. In the early 1970s the locomotives were renumbered 73001-73006.

Following successful trials of the initial locomotives, a production run of 43 locomotives were ordered as part of the Bournemouth Electrification and built by English Electric at their Vulcan Foundry between 1965 and 1967. They were initially classified as Class JB and numbered E6007-E6049. They differed slightly from the six earlier machines, most notably having an increased tractive effort as well as a higher maximum speed (90 mph as opposed to 80). Following the introduction of TOPS, they became Class 73/1 and were renumbered 73101-73142. One locomotive, E6027, had already been withdrawn following accident damage and so was not renumbered. Further changes were the use of large round Oleo buffers with a pneumatic withdrawal mechanism rather than the traditional coach style (oval) saddle buffer which relied on a pin and spring mechanism. As the JA examples came in for overhaul over the years, the saddle buffers were also replaced making visual identification of the differing machines almost impossible from a distance.

From new, all members of the class were fitted with the Pullman style rubbing plate between the buffers allowing them to close couple with Southern Region electro-pneumatically controlled electric multiple units and diesel electric multiple units for push-pull train operation – the reason for retractable buffers.

Being built to the Hastings Line gauge, the locomotives were able to be used on all routes of BR's Southern Region network.

== Technical details ==
The design parameter of the Class 73 was to provide a secondary main line electric locomotive to the then Southern Region’s "mixed traffic" requirements, with the added ability to deliver, shunt and collect freight to and from yards adjoining the electrified network under diesel power. The shunting requirement meant these locomotives had dual controls on both sides of the cab.

The limitations of a 1,600 hp electric locomotive meant that it was only capable of hauling maximum ten-coach trains to the proposed post-steam era Southern Region express timings, as were the similarly powered Type 3 BRCW Class 33 diesel locos with 1,550 hp. Southern express electric multiple units had, by comparison, at least 1,000 hp per four-car unit. To assume that the Class 73 was suitable to haul passenger or freight trains away from the electrified network with just a 600 hp diesel engine would be unrealistic. In fact the use of the slightly more powerful Class 74 electro-diesels, with 650 hp on diesel, to haul parcels trains up Poole Bank and work freight trains around the West London Line to Acton, Brent and Willesden, resulted in repeated failures; this was, therefore, a major contributory factor to that class's early demise.

There were eight third rail collector shoes on the Class 73 – four per bogie with two each side. These shoes were of the retractable type – a necessity for both safety and operational reasons, as described above. They could cope with all the then (1965) voltages of 660V and 750V as well as the 800V of the Bournemouth electrification beyond Pirbright Junction south of Woking (from autumn 1966). 660V was phased out in line with pre-BR type electric multiple unit (EMU) withdrawals, the last EMUs incapable of working in passenger service on anything greater than 660V being the 4SUB Bulleid design. Thus all BR post-1951 EMU designs could cope with 750V or 800V.

Gaps in the third rail at complex pointwork or level crossings mean that a short electric locomotive such as Class 73 is liable to momentarily lose power when passing over. This results in noticeable arcing if the driver does not shut off power. However, this rarely affects the locomotives, except to burn out the carbon brush pick-up shoes more quickly. The issue of arcing only became a problem when some of these locomotives were altered to work "Gatwick Express" services using modified Mark 2 coaching stock and 500 hp Gatwick Luggage Vans (GLVs), as 750V power jumpers between locos or units were banned on BR designs (the last EMUs to have such jumpers were the Bulleid designed 4SUBs). The Class 73s therefore could not benefit from the pick-up shoes at the opposite end of the train on the GLV. As a result of removing the last bank of resistance on the Class 73 locos to make these trains accelerate more quickly, arcing increased. Therefore, to reduce damage to other electrical equipment from the increased arcing, these particular locomotives had "flash guards" fitted on their bogies around the shoes. Stories of Class 73s catching fire were greatly exaggerated.

The Class 73 locomotives were very versatile, with dual cab controls; three brake systems (vacuum, air and EPB) as detailed below; a well-designed cab with good sighting that aided shunting; the ability to work fitted freight (fully braked) and unfitted freight (no train brakes) as well as locomotive-hauled coaching stock; the ability to work in multiple with blue star coded diesel locomotives; and the ability to operate in multiple with the Southern's diesel electric multiple unit fleet (Class 73/0) or its electric multiple unit fleet (Class 73/1).

=== Power supply ===
Unlike the previous Southern Region Class 70 and Class 71 electric locomotives, these did not have a booster to maintain traction power over gaps in the conductor rail. However, they could move forward onto an electrified section under diesel power.

=== Diesel engine and generator ===
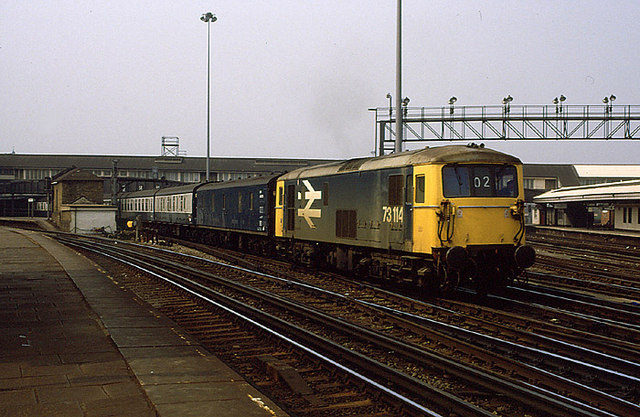
A British Rail Class 73 with a parcels van and carriages under British Rail carrying the mail in 1986 through Clapham Junction.

The 600 horsepower (447 kW) English Electric 4SRKT Mk II diesel engine was less powerful, but more reliable than the 650 horsepower (485 kW) Paxman 6YJXL fitted to the later Class 74 electro-diesel locomotives.

=== Traction control ===
The Class 73 was fitted with two separate power controllers on the driver's desk (and replicated on the secondman's side); one for electric or auxiliary power (under diesel power) and the other only for diesel power. The auxiliary power arrangement was to accommodate diesel operation when being driven from mainline EMU stock.

=== Multiple working ===
Multiple working is when two or more locomotives are coupled together and controlled by a driver in the leading driving position. This was achieved with the aid of the standard SR 27-wire jumper connection system, a design that ensured excellent compatibility. They could work with other 33/1, 71, 74, locomotives (in fact any type 2,3 or 4 blue-star coded mainline locomotive) and EP multiple unit stock.

In order for the Class 73s to achieve their maximum versatility, the locomotives also had to have multiple brake systems. When built in the 1960s, this required vacuum brakes for use with freight, most locomotive-hauled carriages, and many other locomotives, including steam; also air brakes for use with the newest BR-designed wagons, and newer types of passenger carriages and locomotives; and, for use with the Southern's electric and diesel multiple unit fleets, the Electro Pneumatic Brake (EPB).

Class 73/9 variants have been fitted with the AAR system, allowing for multiple working with Classes 59, 66 & 67.

=== Couplings ===
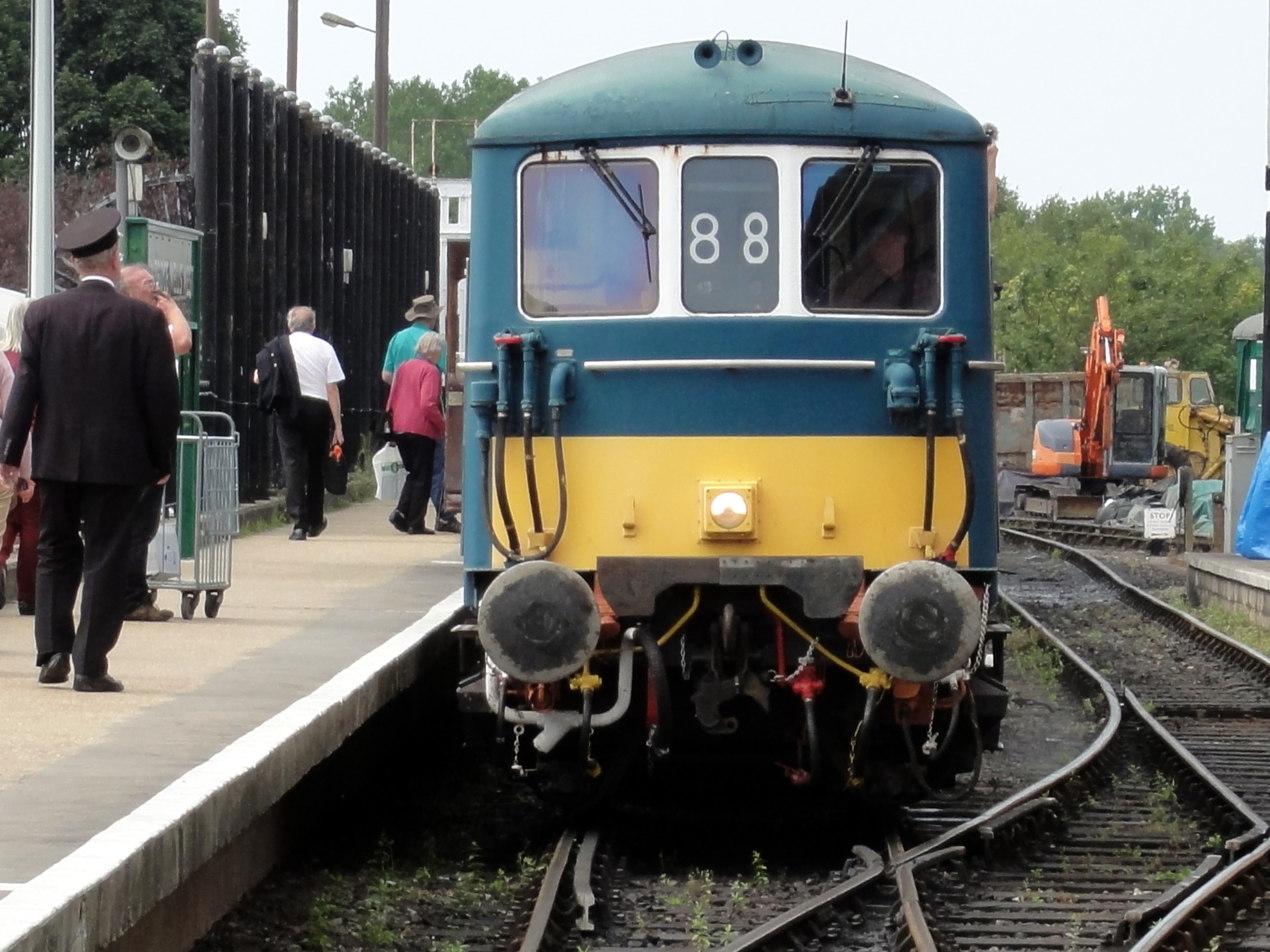
Dual buffer-and-chain and automatic coupler with knuckle swung out of the way (drop head) on 73140.

The Class 73s also have two couplings; a rigid semi-automatic type known as the "buckeye", needed for coupling to most types of coaching stock, and the then-BR(SR) types of Multiple unit. The knuckle of this coupling could be lowered on a hinge (by removing a locating pin in its shank) to reveal the classic British hook. Over the hook could be coupled a "3 Link" chain coupling, or an "Instanter" chain type, or a "Screwlink" chain type. However, the rigid "Buckeye" type coupling, because it maintains a fixed distance between vehicles, presents a dangerous problem when buffers are present. The standard British buffer is needed to cope with the variable distance of chain-type couplings, to reduce buffeting and snatching behaviour. But with the shorter rigid Buckeye in use, the buffers cannot compact enough in curves and would derail one or both vehicles. So, buffers on Buckeye fitted vehicles have to be of the "Retractable" type. They are extended when chain type coupling is in use, but retracted out of the way so they cannot touch when the Buckeye is in use. This then presents another problem: how will buffing and snatching be dealt with when the Buckeye is in use? The solution is to move the buffing control to the centre of the vehicle, where the change in angles between vehicle corners is greatly reduced in curves; hence the "Pullman Rubbing Bar" seen between the buffers on Class 73 locos, and Class 33/1 diesels. This flat-looking plate is mounted on two hydraulic rams to act like a buffer. Its shape is actually the floor section of a Pullman Gangway connection as seen on Buckeye fitted coaches (such as Mk1 types) or Multiple units. The Pullman gangway connection, being itself semi-rigid, has a similar two hydraulic rams hidden behind its floor section to do the job of buffing, so it happily matches the Pullman Rubbing Plate in size and shape on the Class 73.

The Class 73/1s were noted being delivered from English Electric's plant at Newton-le-Willows working in Multiple with new Class 20 1,000 hp diesels as these were being built at the same plant concurrently, so only one driver was needed to move both locos under (diesel) power. In normal use the Class 73/1s were often seen working with Bournemouth line electric TC (non-powered) sets, which allowed such trains to be driven in Push-Pull mode. Although technically possible, the Class 73/1s were not allowed to work in multiple or tandem with the Bournemouth line 4REP EMUs as this would exceed the "Current Limit Index" (CLI). The CLI is a rating system for all electrically powered stock, and to exceed the maximum permitted can result in sub stations and other electrical equipment being damaged.

== Operations ==
=== British Rail ===
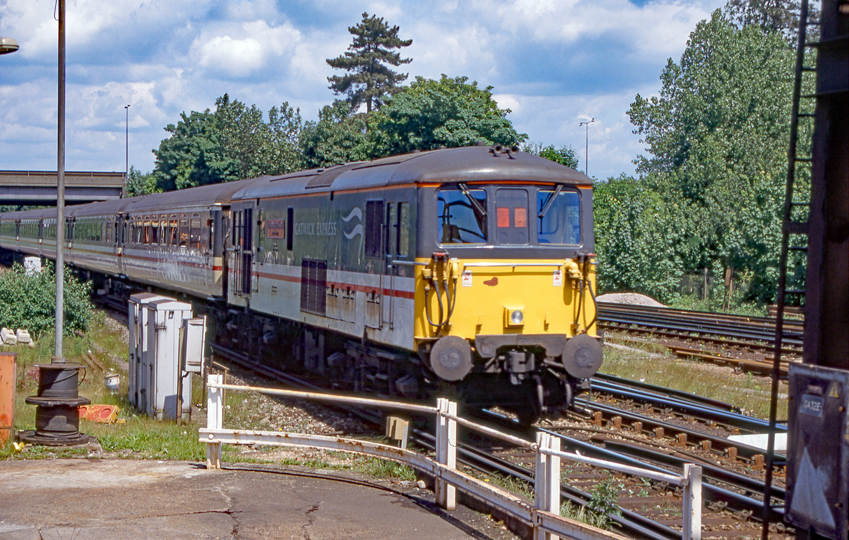
Class 73 on Gatwick Express

During 1984, a small subfleet of Class 73s were dedicated to work the upgraded Gatwick Express service, which would feature a Class 73 at the southern end, a rake of air-conditioned Mk2f coaches which had been modified to carry Southern Region multiple unit control jumpers, and a Class 489 "GLV" (themselves converted from former Class 414 driving Motor coaches) at the north end. Both the Class 73 and the GLV provided power, and the trains ran non-stop between London Victoria and Gatwick Airport.

=== Post-privatisation operations ===
Since privatisation, the Class 73 fleet has been reduced in size following the large-scale withdrawals of the EWS and Gatwick Express fleets. However, many smaller operators have acquired locomotives, so their continued use is assured for the foreseeable future.

==== Eurostar ====
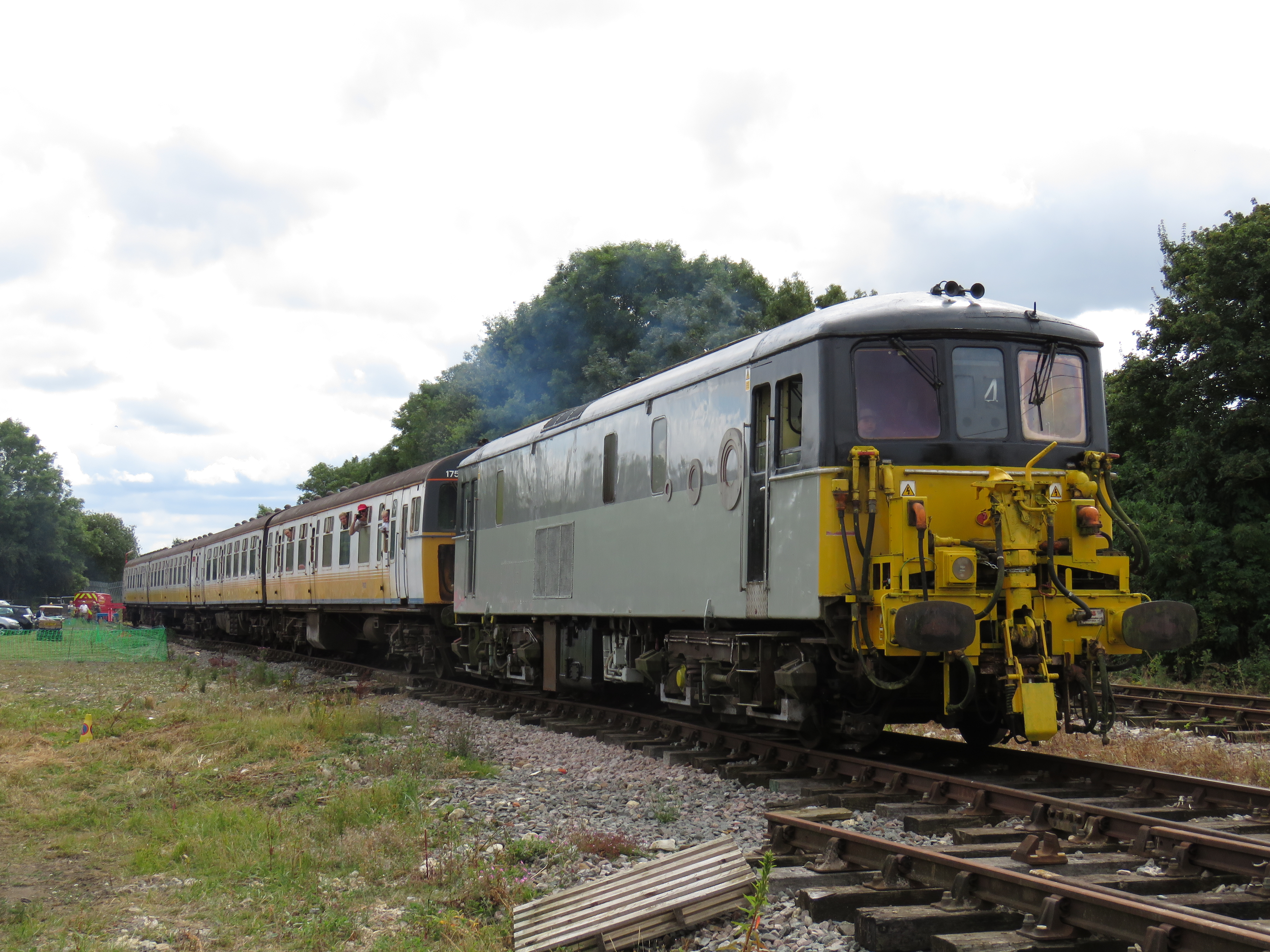
Eurostar Class 73 73130 at Finmere in preservation hauling 4CIG 1753 on an open day at this former Great Central station site in 2016.

Eurostar owned and formerly operated two Class 73 locomotives, which were specially modified to enable them to haul a Eurostar unit. The two locomotives; 73118 and 73130, have additional coupling equipment fitted and were primarily used to rescue failed Eurostar sets, or to haul them over non-electrified routes. They were rarely used away from North Pole depot. When Eurostar moved its operations to the new Temple Mills depot and onto the overhead wiring of High Speed 1 in 2007, the Class 73 locomotives became redundant and were loaned to educational initiatives: 73130 went to RailSchool in East London and 73118 went to Barry Rail Centre in South Wales. Subsequently, when RailSchool failed, 73130 was loaned to the Bluebell Railway but is stored away from the railway. As of 5 November 2022 73130 is now in the hands of the 73130 Ltd based at the Llanelli and Mynydd Mawr Railway in Carmarthenshire.

==== FM Rail ====
FM Rail (previously Fragonset Railways) bought several redundant locomotives from EWS. Most of these were initially stored at various locations around the country, including preservation sites, such as the Mid-Hants Railway, the Peak Railway and the Dartmoor Railway. Some of these locomotives were repaired for use on these heritage railways, such as number 73134 on the Dartmoor Railway.

One locomotive, number 73107 "Spitfire" returned to mainline traffic in 2004 following overhaul. It was repainted in Fragonset's black freight livery, and was expected to be used on empty coaching stock moves associated with charter trains. It was regularly hired to First GBRf from late 2004 as cover for their fleet and was based at c2c's East Ham Depot along with the Blue Pullman Rake. In 2007 it was acquired by RT Rail and has been overhauled and repainted in a GBRf-esque livery at St. Leonards Depot.

==== Gatwick Express / Southern ====
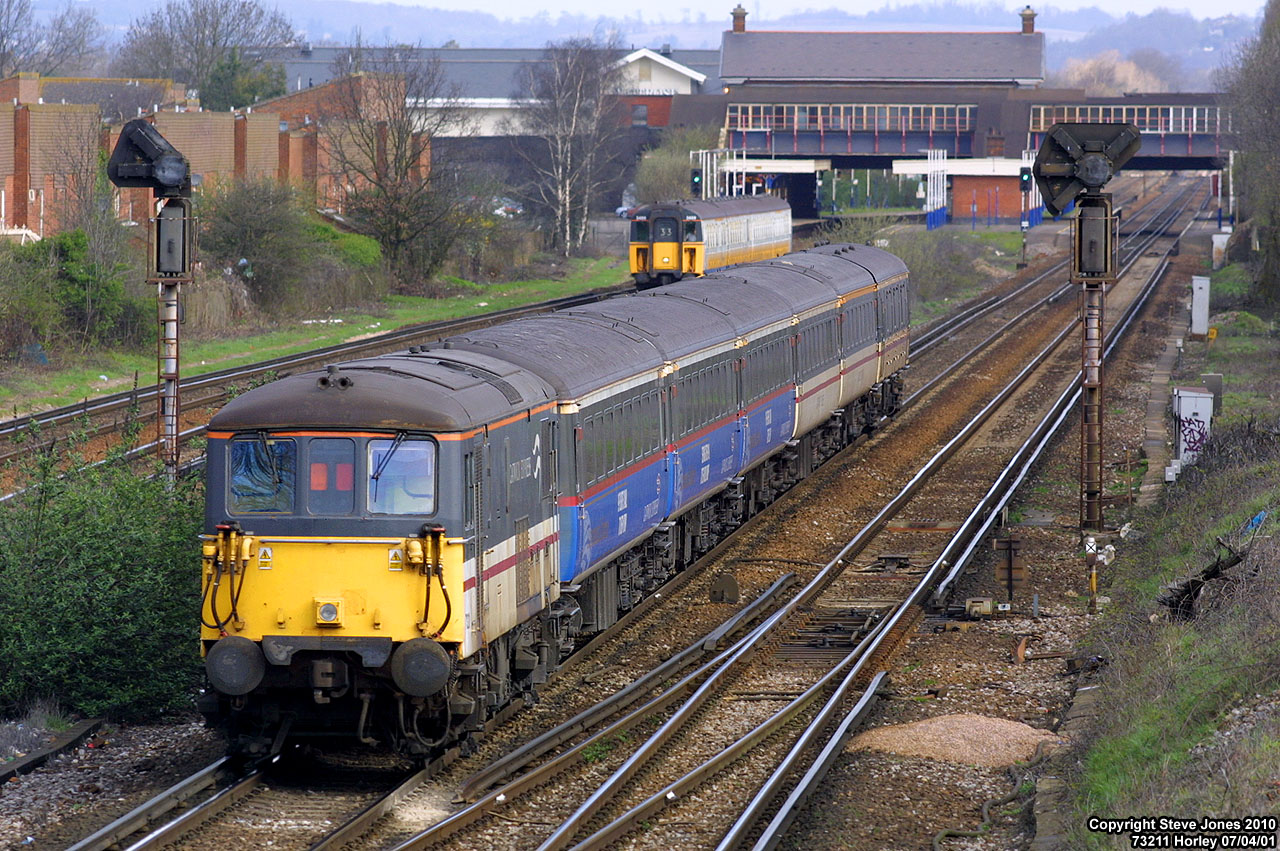
73211 with a Gatwick Express train at Horley in 2001

Until mid-2005, Gatwick Express operated several Class 73s with Class 488 coaching stock and Class 489 GLVs. These have now been withdrawn and replaced by EMUs. However, 73202 was retained as a "Thunderbird" engine to rescue failed EMUs. Along with the rest of the Gatwick Express franchise, it later passed to Southern. The locomotive, formerly "Dave Berry", was renamed "Graham Stenning" after the company's Apprentice Manager, at Brighton Lovers Walk Depot on 11 December 2015.

==== GB Railfreight ====
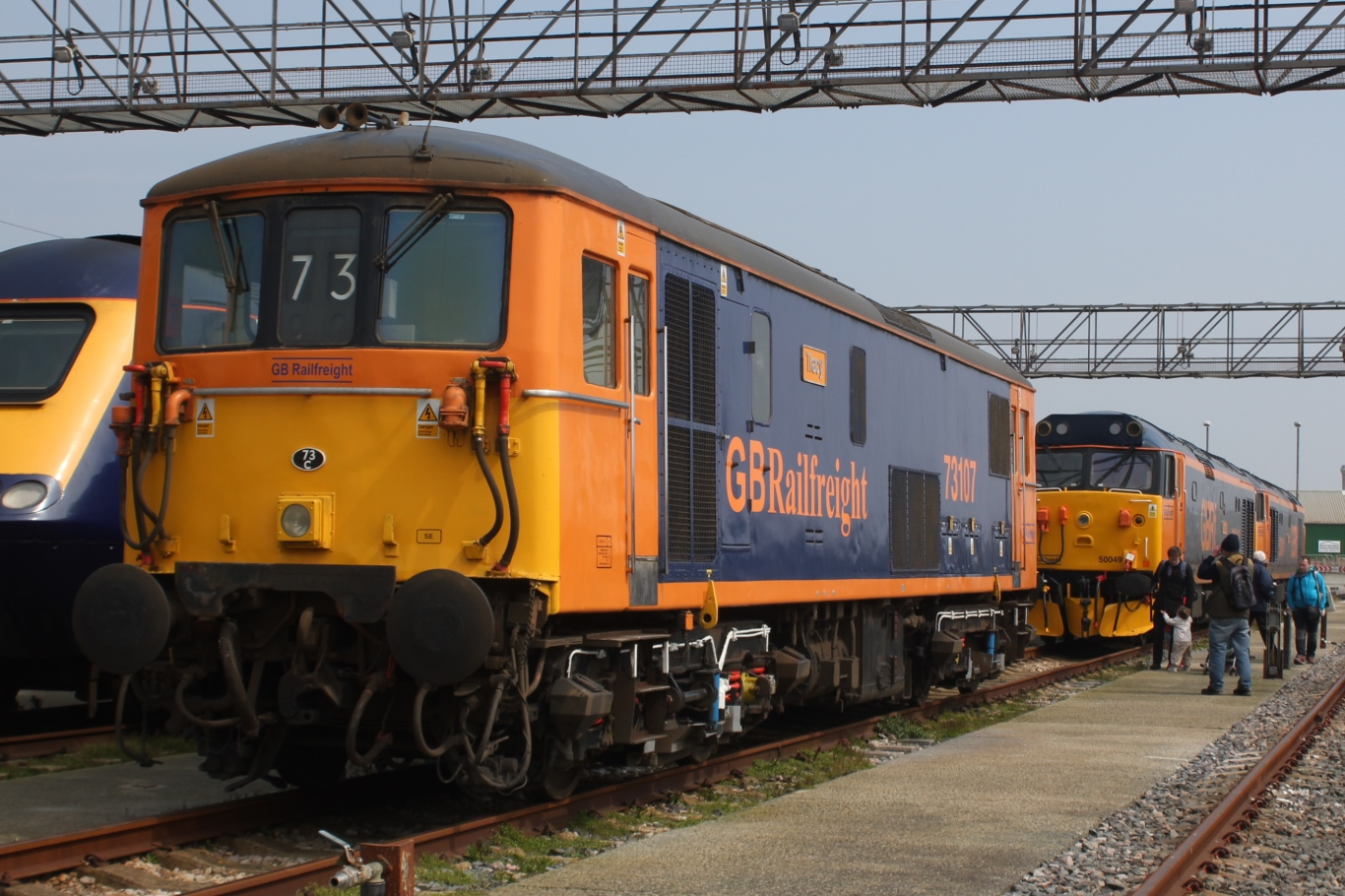
73107 is on display at Long Rock Depot open day, along with freshly painted 50049 and 50007.

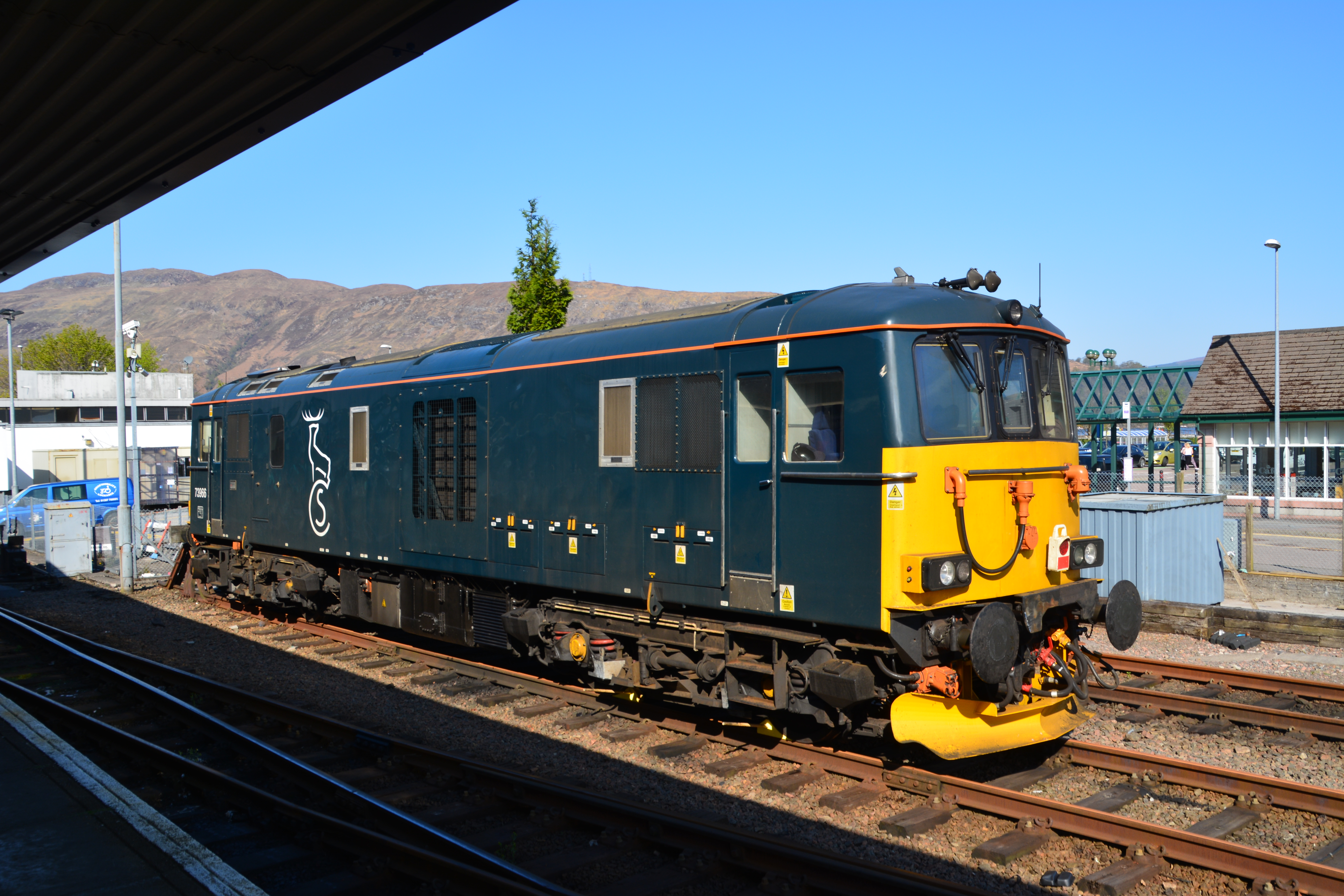
73966 in Caledonian Sleeper livery at Fort William Station.

GB Railfreight is the newest operator of Class 73 locomotives, having bought six redundant Gatwick Express locomotives, numbers 73203-207 and 73209. Four of these (73204-206 and 209) have now been returned to traffic after overhaul by Fragonset at Derby. They have been repainted in the company's blue and orange livery and named after female employees. The locomotives are primarily used on engineering trains originating from Eastleigh and Tonbridge. The former company First GBRf purchased 73208 and repainted it into BR Blue. In early 2009 73207 was repainted in Large Logo Blue and used for shunting duties in Whitemoor Yard. First GBRf also acquired 73141, 73212 and 73213, with all three painted in the new First Group livery; however, 73212 lacks the FirstGroup logo. 73141 was named 'Charlotte' in July 2009, which was known for being named twice in February 2009. Now operated by the Eurotunnel Group, the trains are now being de-branded from the First Group branding. 73119 was purchased from Knights Rail Services in September 2011 and returned to service in June 2012. In 2013, Class 73s 73109 and 73136 were brought by GB Railfreight. They have since been repainted along with First GBRf liveried 73141, 212 and 73213 at St. Leonards Depot into GB Railfreight livery.

Commencing in 2013, five GB Railfreight Class 73s were re-engined as Class 73/9 by Brush Traction Wabtec at their factory in Loughborough. The first three converted locomotives, renumbered 73961-3 from 73209, 73204 and 73206 respectively, were fitted with MTU 1,600 hp V8 engines. All existing mechanical and electrical components were removed prior to the re-fit, and the frontal appearance of the locomotives has been altered by the provision of light clusters and the installation of a more central location for the jumper cables. The dual driving positions have been retained although with a new design for the driver's controls. The refurbished locomotives will be capable of working with existing Class 73/1 and 73/2 units in either diesel or electric mode. The first completed locomotive, 73962 (ex-73204), was unveiled on 3 August 2014 at Brush Traction Loughborough.

GB Railfreight use re-engined Class 73/9 locomotives to haul the Caledonian Sleeper. They are used for the non-electrified sections of the route, running from Edinburgh to Aberdeen, Inverness and Fort William.

==== Merseyrail Electrics ====
Merseyrail Electrics had a fleet of four Class 73/0 locomotives (numbers 73001/2/5/6), based at Birkenhead North TMD, for use on shunting and other departmental duties. Two, numbers 73001 and 73006, were repainted into Merseyrail's yellow livery; they were later fitted with sandite discharging equipment and reclassified as Class 73/9. All four locomotives were withdrawn from traffic by 2002, and all were later sold for preservation.

73004 was also owned by Merseyrail during this period. It was used as a source of spare parts and was the first to be cut up.

==== Network Rail ====
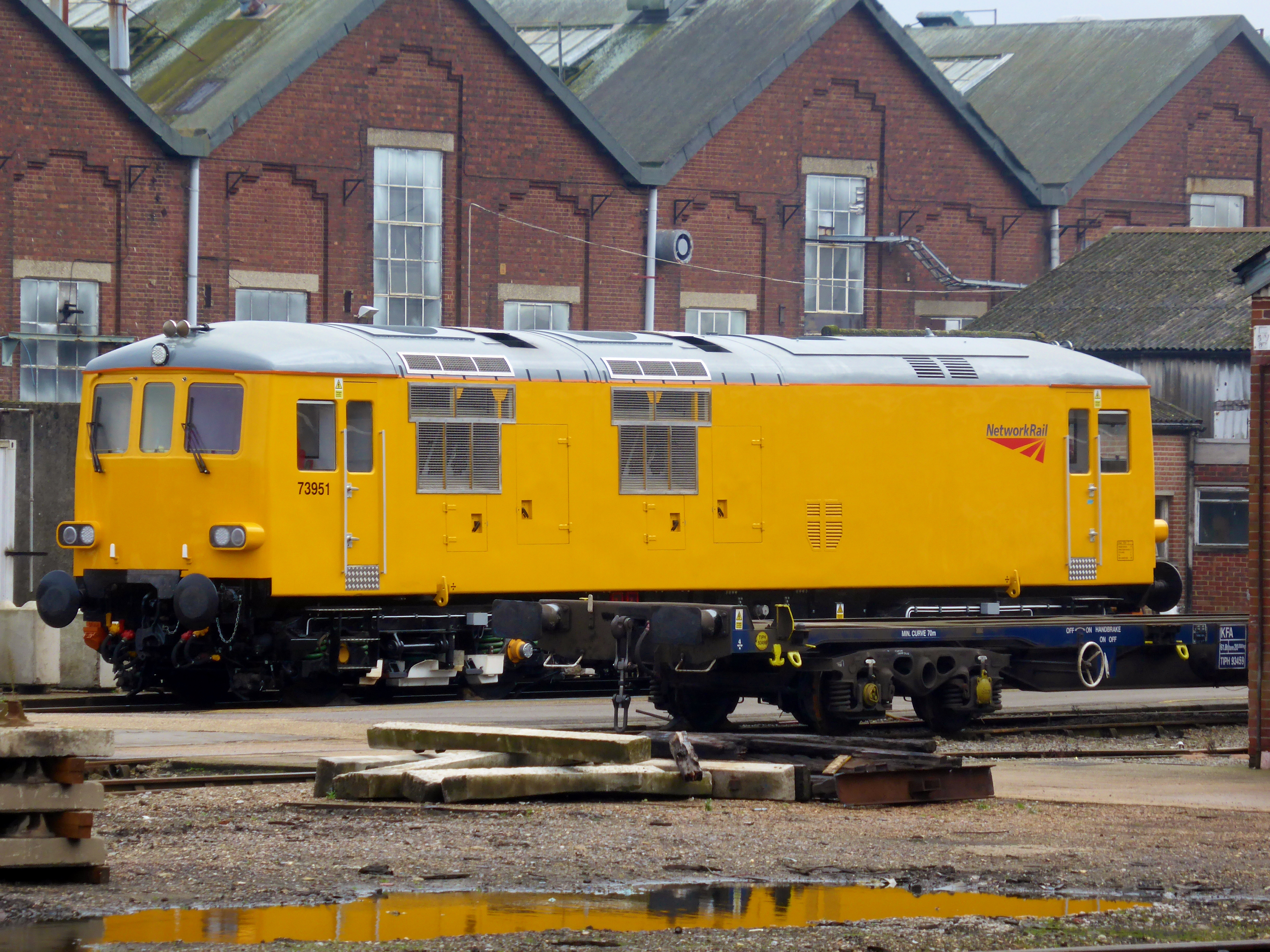
No. 73951 (previously 73104 and E6010) at Eastleigh works in 2015 following conversion to Ultra73 specification.

Network Rail inherited two redundant Gatwick Express locomotives, numbers 73212 and 73213, from its predecessor Railtrack. These were overhauled and painted in Railtrack's company's blue and green livery. They were used on engineering trains associated with an upgrade of electrical supply systems on the former Southern Region.

A third locomotive, number 73141, was originally bought for spare parts, but was returned to traffic in case of failure of one of the other two locomotives. The locomotives were later repainted into Network Rail all-over-yellow with red buffer beams.

In 2009, 73141 was acquired by First GBRf, with 73212 and 73213 following shortly afterward.

Two locomotives, numbers 73211 and 73104, were completely rebuilt by Rail Vehicle Engineering Limited (RVEL) of Derby. The 600 hp diesel engine was removed and replaced by a pair of Cummins QSK19 750 hp diesel engines, increasing the total diesel horsepower to 1,500. The locomotives are used by Network Rail and are classified 73/9. The Cummins QSK19 is the same engine used in the Class 220 and Class 221 diesel multiple units. 73101 has been sold from preservation and will be added to the overhaul program. The first prototype of Network Rail's new 'Ultra73' locomotives was unveiled on Friday 13 June 2014 at RVEL in Derby.

Both of Network Rail's Class 73/9s were put up for sale in August 2023 as surplus to requirements.

==== RT Rail ====
RT Rail acquired loco number 73107 from FM Rail in 2007, and had it overhauled and repainted at St. Leonards Depot.

==== South Western Railway ====
South West Trains inherited one locomotive, number 73109, which is used as a "Thunderbird" rescue locomotive. It was named in 1990 to commemorate the 50th anniversary of the Battle of Britain. It is affectionately known as "BoB" by rail enthusiasts.

South West Trains later expanded its fleet, by leasing two more locomotives from Porterbrook, numbers. 73201 and 73235. Both are former Gatwick Express locomotives. The first of these, number 73235, was overhauled in early 2005 and repainted in the new Desiro blue livery. It was joined by number 73201 later in the same year. Around the same time, number 73109 was also repainted into the new blue livery. 73109 was acquired by Transmart Trains in 2009.

73235 is being used for shunting at Bournemouth Depot by South Western Railway.

==== Transmart Trains (formerly The Class 73 Locomotive Preservation Company) ====
The Class 73 Locomotive Preservation Company (C73LPC) formed in 2004 to manage locomotive 73136 at Stewarts Lane Depot, London. 73136, the last 73 operated by EWS was renamed "Perseverance", is now fully fitted with TPWS and OTMR equipment following the implementation of OTMR during the summer of 2006. The locomotive is registered for use on the national rail network and is available for either short term 'spot' hire or medium-term contracts. The locomotive was hired to the Bluebell Railway during 2009 to assist with its Northern Extension to East Grinstead. In August 2006, the company was contracted by GBRf to repaint GBRf's 73208 into BR Blue for future use on charter work with 73136. The company has also restored 73210 at Stewarts Lane Depot, this locomotive is privately owned. The locomotive moved to its new home on the Mid Norfolk Railway in September 2008.

The Class 73 Locomotive Preservation Company changed ownership in 2009 and was renamed Transmart Trains in 2010. Following the takeover, the company expanded its operations and managed five Class 73 locomotives. These were 73109, 73118, 73133, 73136 and 73211. Number 73211 had been stripped for spares and is unlikely to return to service in its original form. 73133 has since been sold to a partner group of Transmart, and left Selhurst by road for a new life at Barry Island. Subsequently, the locomotive was transited by rail to South West Trains Bournemouth Depot on long term hire.

In 2013, Class 73s 73109 and 73136 were sold on for further use with GB Railfreight. They have since been repainted along with First GBRf liveried 73141, 73212 and 73213 at St. Leonards Depot into GB Railfreight livery.

== Preservation ==
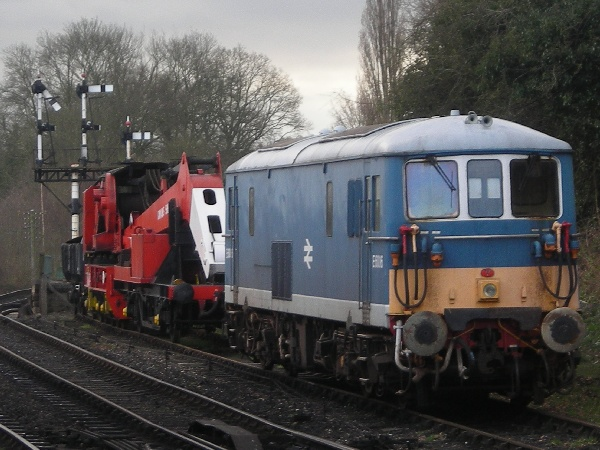
No.E6006 in preservation at Bridgnorth on the Severn Valley Railway

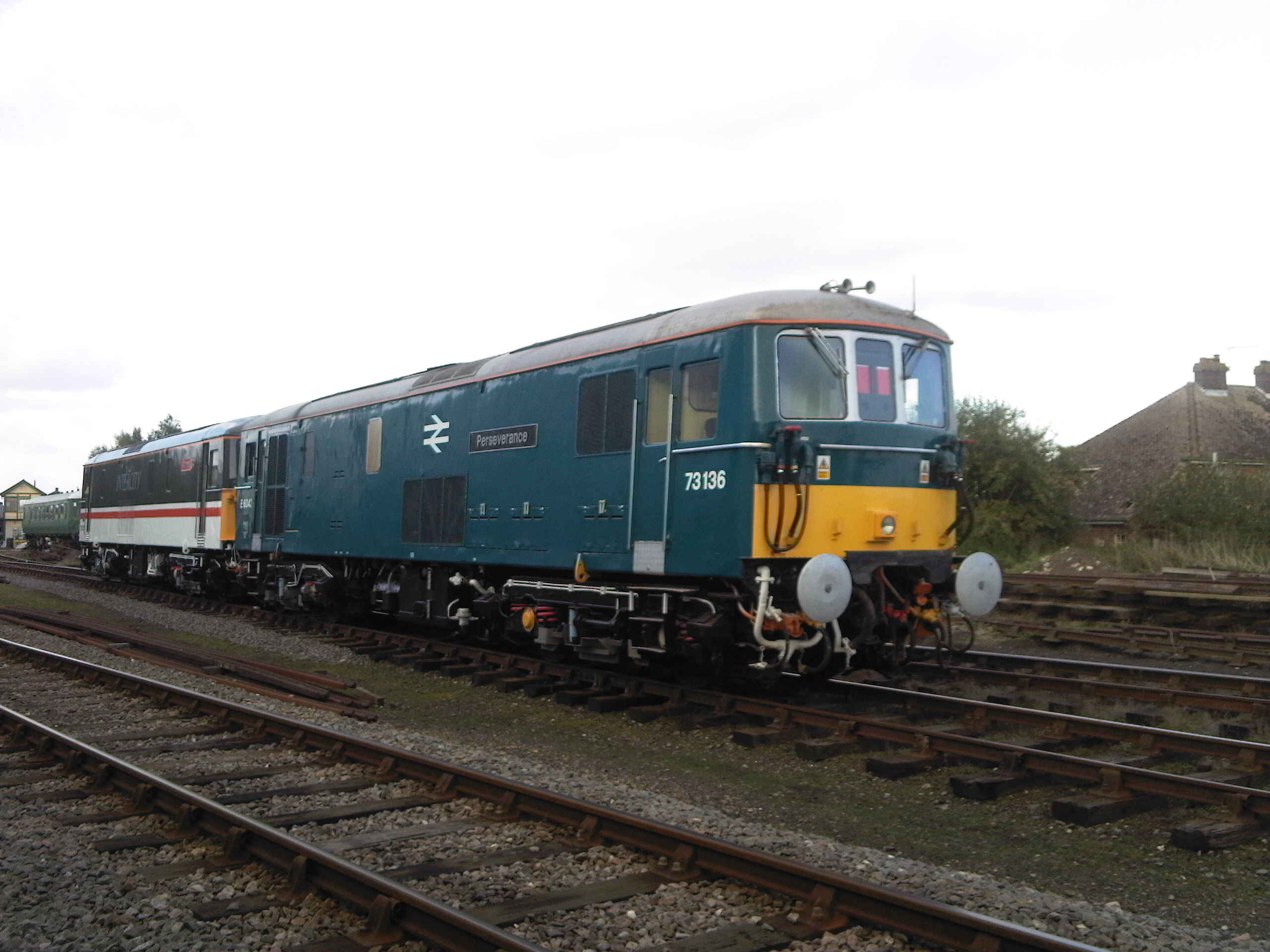
73210 and 73136 at Dereham on the Mid-Norfolk Railway

Several locomotives have been preserved on heritage railways, where perforce they run on their diesel engines: no preserved line has third rail electrification.

== Fleet ==
=== Summary ===
Class	No. built (Converted*)	No. range	Operators	Loco nos.	No. in traffic	Withdrawn	No. preserved
Class 73/0	6	73001-73006	-	-	-	1998–2002	3
Class 73/1	43	73101-73142	Eurostar	73118, 73130	2	2007	8
Class 73/1	43	73101-73142	Nemesis Rail	73114	1	-	8
Class 73/1	43	73101-73142	GB Railfreight	73107, 73109, 73119, 73128, 73136, 73141	6	-	8
Class 73/1	43	73101-73142	Network Rail	73138	1	-	8
Class 73/2	14*	73201-73213, 73235	GB Railfreight	73201, 73202, 73212, 73213	4	-	1
Class 73/2	14*	73201-73213, 73235	South Western Railway	73235	1	-	1
Class 73/9	13*	73951-73952	Network Rail	73951-73952	2	-	0
Class 73/9	13*	73961-73971	GB Railfreight	73961-73971	11	-	0

=== List ===
Key:	In service	Stored	Scrapped	Preserved

Numbers				Name(s) (Date carried)	Operator	Livery	Status	Notes
Pre-TOPS	TOPS			Name(s) (Date carried)	Operator	Livery	Status	Notes
E6001	73001	73901		-	Locomotive Services Limited	BR Blue	Preserved	Withdrawn May 2000. Preserved by Locomotive Services Limited. Currently at Crewe Diesel TMD.
E6002	73002	-	-		-	BR Blue Large Logo	Stored	Withdrawn in November 1995 and stored at Kirkdale TMD as a source of spare parts, along with 73005 (73005 was, however, later resurrected). It was later stored for spares at Lydney Junction on the Dean Forest Railway and then at its current location, Eastleigh Works. In 2019, it was acquired by Locomotive Services Limited. Despite it being heavy stripped of parts, it retains the power unit from 73132.
E6003	73003	-	-	Sir Herbert Walker (1993–)	Swindon & Cricklade Railway	BR Green	Preserved	Withdrawn September 1996. Preserved at Swindon & Cricklade Railway.
E6004	73004	-	-	The Bluebell Railway (1987–1990)	-	Bluebell Blue	Scrapped	Withdrawn September 1991. Used as a source of spare parts for 73003 at Isfield. Scrapped at Kingsbury by HNRC in February 2004.
E6005	73005	73966	-	-	GB Railfreight	Caledonian Blue	In service	Converted to Class 73/9 at Brush Traction, Loughborough in 2015.
E6006	73006	73906	73967	-	GB Railfreight	Caledonian Blue	In service	Converted to Class 73/9 at Brush Traction, Loughborough in 2015.
E6007	73101	-	-	Brighton Evening Argus (1980–1992); The Royal Alex (1992–)	-	Pullman	Stored	Withdrawn May 2002. Stored at Eastleigh Works.
E6008	73102	73212	-	Airtour Suisse (1985–1997); Fiona	GB Railfreight	GBRf Blue	In service	
E6009	73103	73968	-	-	GB Railfreight	Caledonian Blue	In service	Converted to Class 73/9 at Brush Traction, Loughborough in 2016.
E6010	73104	73951	-	Janis Kong	Harry Needle Railroad Company	Network Rail Yellow	Stored	Rebuilt as 73/9 in 2014/15 for Network Rail, withdrawn May 2023, sold to Harry Needle Railroad Company October 2023
E6011	73105	73969	-	Quadrant (1987–1990)	GB Railfreight	Caledonian Blue	In service	Converted to Class 73/9 at Brush Traction, Loughborough in 2016.
E6012	73106	-	-	-	-	BR Engineers Grey	Scrapped	Withdrawn February 2000. Scrapped by CF Booth, Rotherham in September 2004.
E6013	73107	-	-	Redhill 1844–1994 (1994–1999); Spitfire (2004–?); Tracy (?-)	GB Railfreight	GBRf blue	In service	
E6014	73108	-	-	-	-	Civil Engineers	Scrapped	Withdrawn January 2002. Scrapped by CF Booth, Rotherham in September 2004.
E6015	73109	-	-	Battle of Britain 50th Anniversary (1990–); Battle of Britain 80th Anniversary (2020–)	GB Railfreight	GBRf blue	In service	
E6016	73110	-	-	-	-	BR Electric Blue	Stored	Withdrawn May 2002. Stored at Eastleigh Works.
E6017	73111	-	-	-	-	InterCity Executive	Scrapped	Withdrawn May 1991. Scrapped at Stewarts Lane in January 1997.
E6018	73112	73213	-	University of Kent at Canterbury (1990–1997)	GB Railfreight	GBRf Blue	In service	In 1967, it was briefly given full yellow end livery (experimental at the time).
E6019	73113	73211	73952	County of West Sussex (1986–1991); Malcolm Brinded	Harry Needle Railroad Company	Network Rail Yellow	Stored	Previously withdrawn at Stewarts Lane and heavily stripped of parts before being purchased by RVEL. Rebuilt to become class 73/9 prototype locomotive for Network Rail in 2014. Completed locomotive unveiled on 13 June 2014. Withdrawn May 2023, sold to Harry Needle Railroad Company October 2023
E6020	73114	-	-	Stewarts Lane Traction Maintenance Depot (1994–1999)	Nemesis Rail	BR Large Logo	Preserved	Withdrawn January 1999. Owned by Nemesis Rail.
E6021	73115	-	-		-	BR Blue	Scrapped	Withdrawn April 1982. Scrapped at Slade Green Depot in April 1982 after being involved in a serious collision at East Croydon on 16 January 1982.
E6022	73116	73210	-	Selhurst (1986–1997)	Ecclesbourne Valley Railway	InterCity Swallow	Preserved	Withdrawn September 2002. Preserved at Ecclesbourne Valley Railway.
E6023	73117	73970	-	University of Surrey (1987–1996)	GB Railfreight	Caledonian Blue	In service	Converted to Class 73/9 at Brush Traction, Loughborough in 2016.
E6024	73118	-	-	The Romney, Hythe and Dymchurch Railway (1987–1996)	Eurostar	EPS Grey	Preserved	Preserved at the Barry Tourist Railway. Fitted with Scharfenberg coupling equipment in order to work with Class 373 Eurostar units.
E6025	73119	-	-	Kentish Mercury (1986–1999); Borough of Eastleigh (2009–)	GB Railfreight	GBRf Blue	In service	
E6026	73120	73209	73961	Alison (2005–)	GB Railfreight	GBRf Blue	In service	Converted to Class 73/9 at Brush Traction, Loughborough in 2014.
E6027	-	-	-		-	BR Blue	Scrapped	Extensively damaged in an accident at Horsham on 8 January 1972. Withdrawn July 1972. Scrapped at Slade Green Depot in February 1973.
E6028	73121	73208	73965	Croydon 1883–1983 (1983–1997); Kirsten (2006–2013)	GB Railfreight	GBRf Blue	In service	Renamed Kirsten on 10 August 2006 at London Victoria.
E6029	73122	73207	73971	County of East Sussex (1985–1997)	GB Railfreight	Caledonian Blue	In service	Used for several months as a yard shunter at Whitemoor yard, March before returning to main line service during 2009. Converted to Class 73/9 at Brush Traction, Loughborough in 2017.
E6030	73123	73206	73963	Gatwick Express (1984–1998); Lisa (2005–2013); Janice (2014–)	GB Railfreight	GBRf Blue	In service	Converted to Class 73/9 at Brush Traction, Loughborough in 2014.
E6031	73124	73205	73964	London Chamber of Commerce (1987–1998); Jeanette (2005–)	GB Railfreight	GBRf Blue	In service	Out of service for most of 2010 awaiting new wheelsets and a repaint. This work was completed during early 2011 and was enhanced by an unexpected repaint into InterCity Executive livery by St Leonards TMD.
E6032	73125	73204	73962	Stewarts Lane (1985–1998); Janice (2005–2013); Dick Mabbutt (2014–)	GB Railfreight	GBRf Blue	In service	First GBRf Class 73/9 locomotive to be completed. Unveiled and named Dick Mabbutt on 3 August 2014 at Brush Traction, Loughborough.
E6033	73126	-	-	Kent & East Sussex Railway (1991–1997)	-	Network SouthEast	Scrapped	Stored early/mid-1996. It became a source of spare parts for the Class 73 refurbishment programme at Stewarts Lane in July 1996 and donated a power unit to 73112 (now 73213) for reinstatement. Moved to Old Oak Common TMD in early 1998 to provide further spares before being officially withdrawn January 1999. It was then moved to the Fire Service College at Moreton-in-Marsh and used for training exercises until sold for scrap on 26 July 2009. Scrapped at CF Booth, Rotherham on 6 August 2009.
E6034	73127	73203	-		-	Gatwick Express	Scrapped	Withdrawn May 2001. Stripped for spares during periods in store at Peterborough, Tonbridge and St Leonards TMD. Scrapped during mid-2009.
E6035	73128	-	-	O.V.S. Bulleid C.B.E. (1991–1997); C.M.E. Southern Railway 1937–1949 (2002–)	GB Railfreight	GBRf Blue	In service	Bought from preservation and returned to mainline operation with GBRf in 2014.
E6036	73129	-	-	City of Winchester (1982–2003)	Cambrian Heritage Railways	Electric blue	Preserved	Withdrawn 2003. Preserved at Gloucestershire and Warwickshire Railway, moved to Cambrian Heritage Railways in 2021.
E6037	73130	-	-	City of Portsmouth (1988–1996) (Note: 73130 was named City of Portsmouth in Portsmouth on 2 July 1988.)	Llanelli and Mynydd Mawr Railway	EPS Grey	Preserved	Currently owned by 73130 Ltd at the Llanelli and Mynwydd Mawr Railway. Fitted with Scharfenberg coupling equipment in order to work with Class 373 Eurostar units.
E6038	73131	-	-	County of Surrey (1988–1993)	-	EWS Red/Gold	Scrapped	Withdrawn September 2003. Scrapped by CF Booth, Rotherham in August 2004.
E6039	73132	-	-		-	InterCity Executive	Scrapped	Withdrawn November 1998. Stripped of parts at Derby RTC. Scrapped by Ron Hull Jr at Rotherham in August 2006.
E6040	73133	-	-	The Bluebell Railway (1990–2004)(2023– )		Early BR blue livery with small yellow warning panels	Preserved	Preserved on the Bluebell railway.
E6041	73134	-	-	Woking Homes 1885–1985 (1985–1996)	-	InterCity Executive	Scrapped	Withdrawn April 1999, scrapped CF Booth, Rotherham September 2022
E6042	73135	73235	-		South Western Railway	Blue	In service	Shunter at Bournemouth depot.
E6043	73136	-	-	Kent Youth Music (1992–2004); Perseverance (2004–???); Mhairi (???-2025)	GB Railfreight	GBRf Blue	In service	
E6044	73137	73202	-	Royal Obs. Corps (1985–1997); Dave Berry (2005–2013); Graham Stenning (2015–)	GB Railfreight	Southern/Gatwick Express	In service	Previously carried Gatwick Express livery. Repainted into Southern livery at St Leonards TMD by 9 December 2013. Named Graham Stenning at Lovers Walk Depot on 11 December 2015.
E6045	73138	-	-		GB Railfreight	Network Rail Yellow	Stored	Withdrawn February 2017. Stored at Railway Technical Centre, sold to GB Railfreight for parts October 2023
E6046	73139	-	-		GB Railfreight	-	Stored	Withdrawn March 1999. Stored at Eastleigh Works.
E6047	73140	-	-		Lavender Line	Network SouthEast	Preserved	Withdrawn November 1998. It was preserved at the Spa Valley Railway, but it is privately owned and has since moved to the Lavender Line. It was the first Class 73 to enter preservation and was repainted from BR Blue to Network SouthEast livery for the Spa Valley Railway 2014 Diesel Gala.
E6048	73141	-	-	Ron Westwood / David Gay (2009); Charlotte (2009–2022); Spa Valley Railway 25th Anniversary (2022-)	GB Railfreight	GBRf Blue	In service	Network Rail named 73141 twice (one name on each side) on 20 February 2009. By July 2009, the locomotive was in service with First GBRf and had been renamed to Charlotte.
E6049	73142	73201	-	Broadlands (1980–1998, 2009–)	GB Railfreight	BR Blue	In service	Renamed Broadlands on 21 May 2009 during the centenary celebration of Eastleigh Works.

== Model Railways ==
Lima launched its first version of the BR Class 73 in OO gauge in the early 2000s. Since 2006 Hornby have produced a representation of the prototype using the Lima tooling as part of their range in BR Green, whilst past examples have carried a variety of liveries.

By 2007, Dapol had a broad range of Class 73 models for British N gauge, with examples in GB Railfreight and Gatwick Express liveries added at that time. Dapol has also manufactured the Class 73 in OO gauge since 2015.

== See also ==
- P32AC-DM A United States locomotive with the same ability.
