= British Rail Class 489 =

Class of British electric multiple units

British Rail Class 489 (GLV)
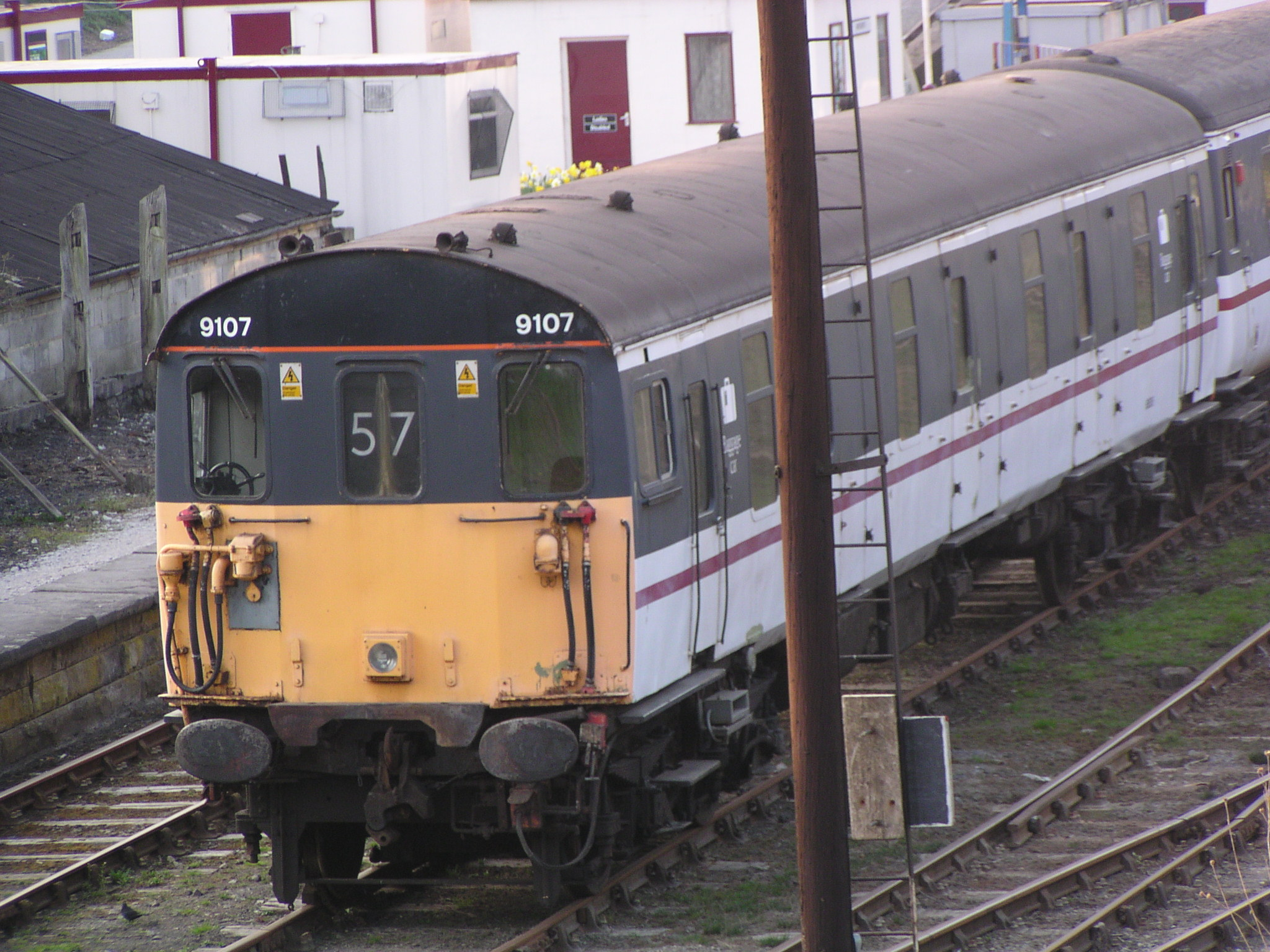
- 489107 at Wirksworth in 2003
- In service: 1984-2005
- Manufacturer: British Rail
- Order no.: 30452
- Built at: Ashford/Eastleigh
- Replaced: Class 427
- Constructed: 1959 (original build); 1983-84 (conversion)
- Entered service: 1984
- Refurbished: British Rail Engineering Limited Eastleigh (conversion)
- Number built: 10
- Number preserved: 4 sets
- Number scrapped: 3 sets.
- Formation: Single car (DMLV)
- Diagram: EX561
- Design code: GLV
- Fleet numbers: (48)9101-(48)9110 (unit); 68500-68509 (car)
- Capacity: Luggage space only
- Operators: British Rail; Gatwick Express
- Depot: Stewarts Lane
- Line served: Brighton Main Line

Specifications
- Car body construction: Steel
- Car length: 19.495 m (63 ft 11 1/2 in) (over body)
- Width: 2.826 m (9 ft 3 1/4 in)
- Height: 3.861 m (12 ft 8 in)
- Doors: Twin-leaf slam
- Articulated sections: Single car
- Wheelbase: 14.173 m (46 ft 6 in) (bogie centres); 2.667 m (8 ft 9 in) (cab-end bogie); 2.591 m (8 ft 6 in) (trailing bogie)
- Maximum speed: 90 mph (140 km/h)
- Weight: 40.5 t (39.9 long tons; 44.6 short tons)
- Traction system: Electric
- Traction motors: 2 × EE507 of 185 kW (248 hp)
- Power output: 370 kW (500 hp)
- HVAC: Electric
- Electric system: 660-750 V DC third rail
- Current collection: Contact shoe
- Bogies: SR mk4 powered and unpowered (one of each)
- Braking system: EP
- Coupling system: Automatic drophead buckeye
- Multiple working: 1951, 1957, 1963 and Gatwick Express stock
- Headlight type: Originally tungsten, later halogen
- Track gauge: 1,435 mm (4 ft 8 1/2 in) standard gauge

Notes/references
- Units converted in 1983-84 from Class 414/3 DMBS vehicles, to operate with Class 488.

The British Rail Class 489 (GLV) electric multiple units were specially converted for use on Gatwick Express trains, from London Victoria to Gatwick Airport.

The units were converted from Class 414 driving motors cars, by Eastleigh Works in 1983-84, for use on the new Gatwick Express service. They were used to allow push-pull operations, on the London-end of the rakes of Class 488 stock, with a Class 73 locomotive at the other end and both used for propulsion. The units were used as baggage cars.

Units were given unit numbers in the range 489101-489110, with individual carriages numbered 68500-68509. However, purely for aesthetic purposes, only the last four digits of the set numbers were shown, to fit with the traditional Southern style (maintained until privatisation by British Rail's Southern region) - older (pre-TOPS) units were originally assigned four-digit numbers. The units were originally painted in BR Blue/Grey livery, which was quickly replaced by InterCity livery. The final livery carried by these units is a variation of the InterCity livery, with a claret stripe and Gatwick Express lettering.

== Fleet status ==
The current status of the fleet is shown below.

Key:	In service	Withdrawn	Preserved	Scrapped

Unit no.	Vehicle nos.		Operator	Withdrawn	Status
Unit no.	DMLV	ex-DMBSO	Operator	Withdrawn	Status
489108	68507	61267	Gatwick Express	2003	Scrapped (2009)
