= St Leonards Depot =

Railway maintenance depot in East Sussex, England

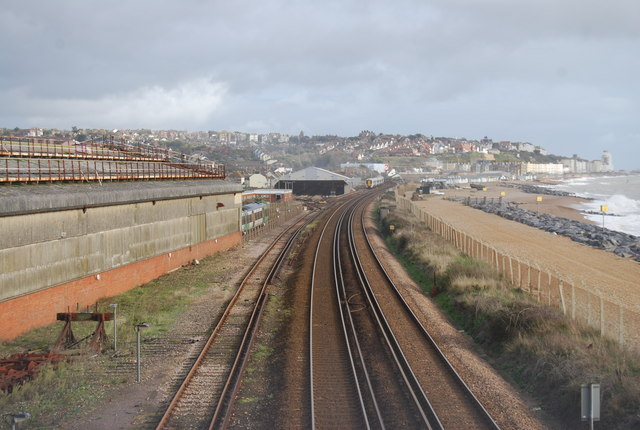
- The depot sheds, adjacent to the main line
- Interactive map of St Leonards Depot

Location
- Location: Bulverhythe, East Sussex,
- Coordinates: 50.8491°N 0.5242°E
- OS grid: TQ777085

Characteristics
- Owner: St Leonards Railway Engineering
- Depot code: SE (1973 -)
- Type: Diesel, DMU, DEMU, EMU

History
- Former depot code: SLEO; 74E (1 February 1950 - 31 May 1958); 73D (1 June 1958 - 5 May 1973)

St Leonards Depot is a traction maintenance depot in Bulverhythe, East Sussex, England. The depot is situated on the East Coastway Line, and is on the north side of the line between Bexhill and St Leonards Warrior Square railway stations. The depot code is SE.

== History ==
The depot was opened in March 1957 as a DEMU depot. From 1963 to 1967, Class 33 locomotives could be seen at the depot. The depot was electrified in 1986.

In 1987, the depot had an allocation of Classes 203, 205, 206 and 207 DEMUs and Class 411 EMUs. By 2010, it was used for servicing Class 377 EMUs.

== Present ==
As of 2017, the depot is used for stabling of Class 66 diesel locomotives, Class 73 diesel-electric locomotives and Class 171 DMUs.

== Gallery ==
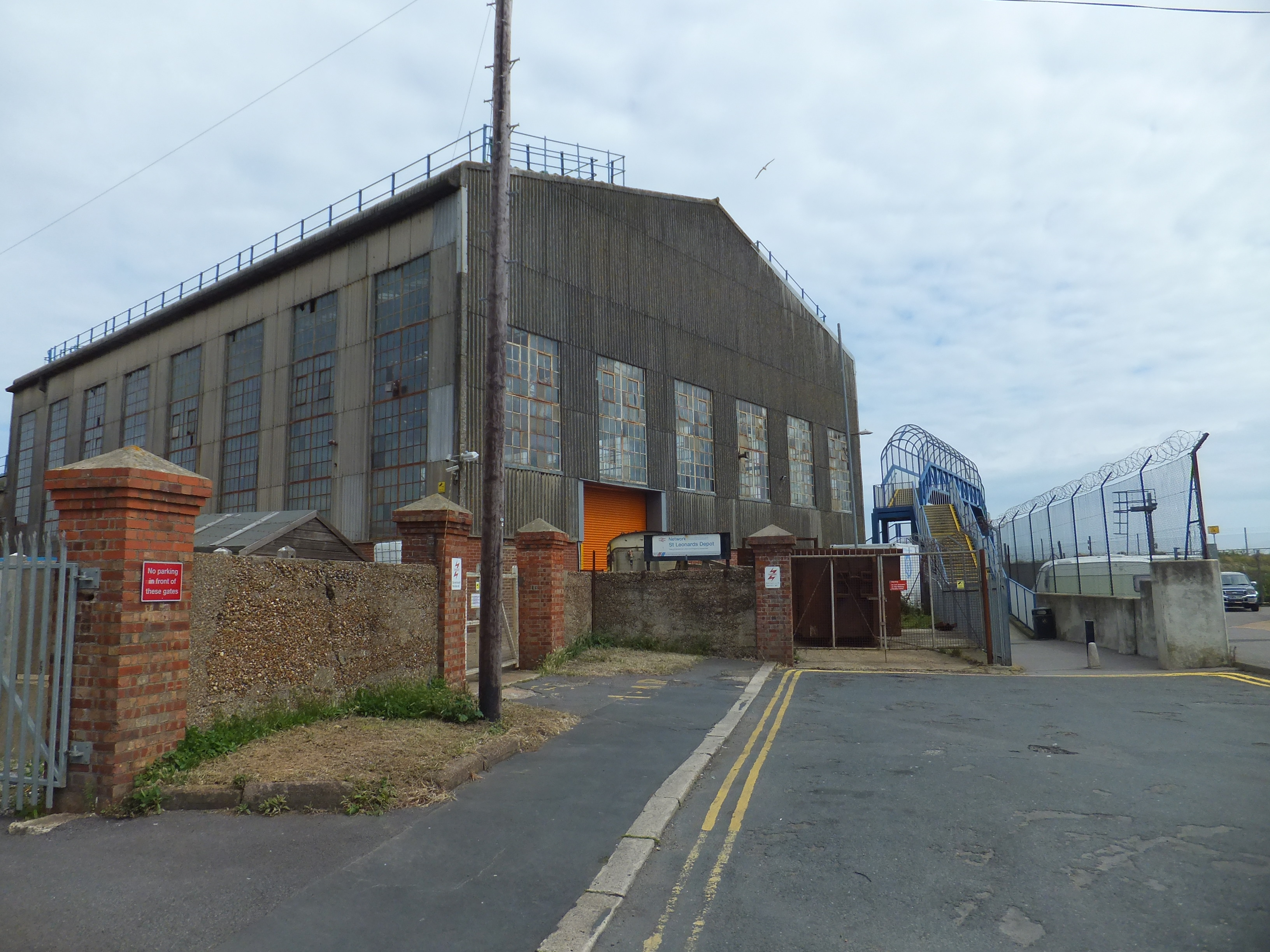
Seen from the west end, 2012

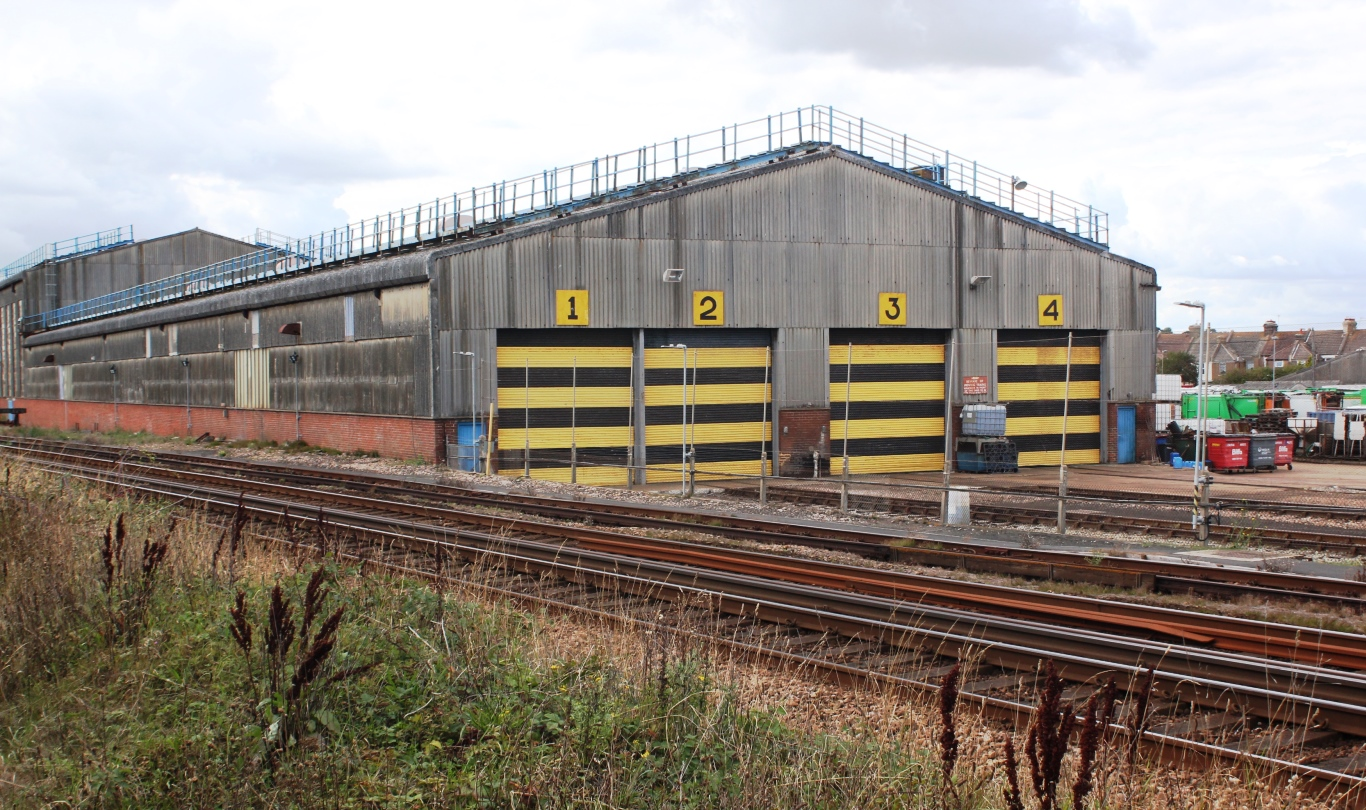
Seen from the east end, 2018

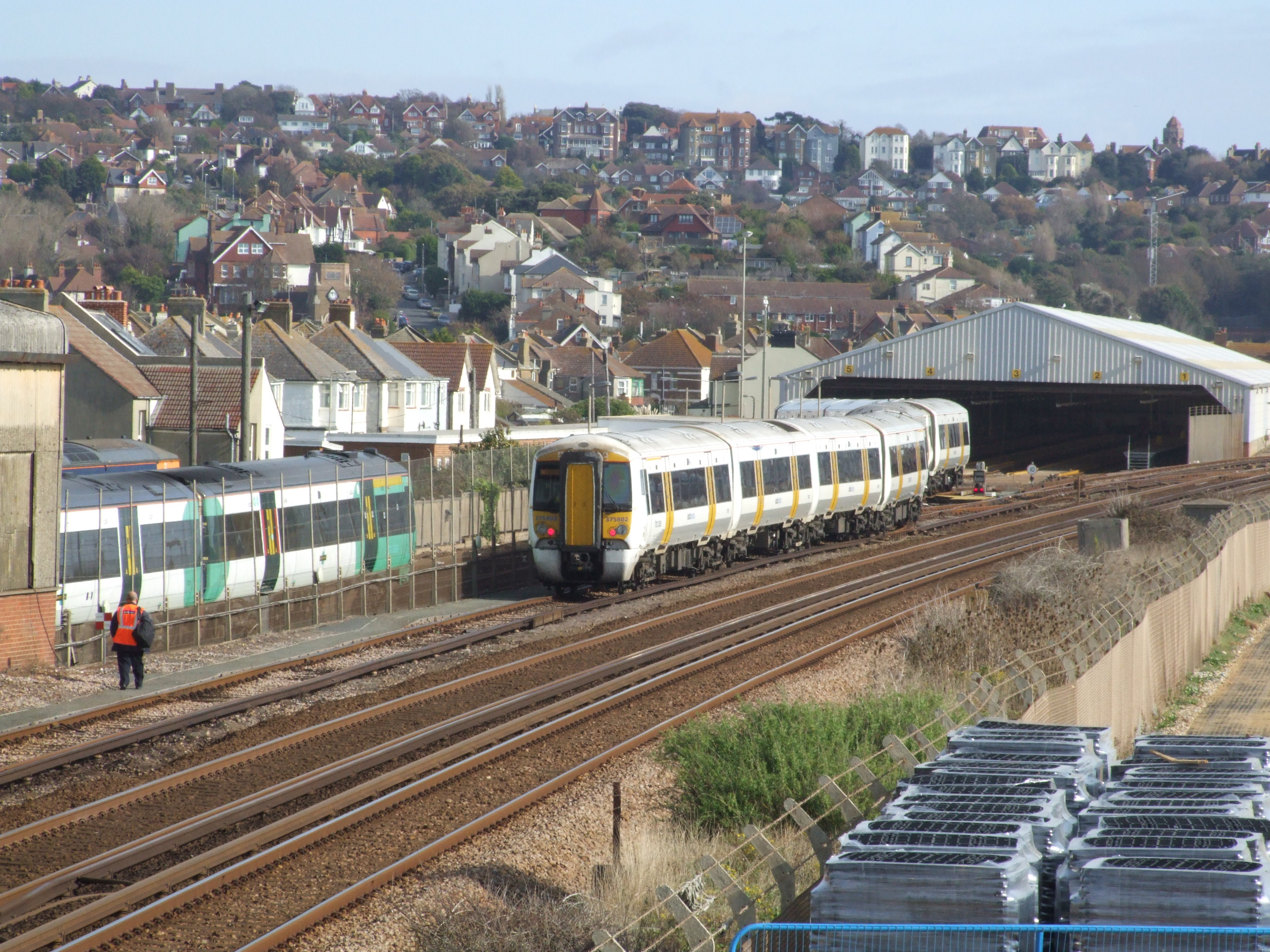
Adjacent to the main line, 2011
