= Brighton Lovers Walk Traction and Rolling Stock Maintenance Depot =

Railway maintenance depot in Brighton, East Sussex

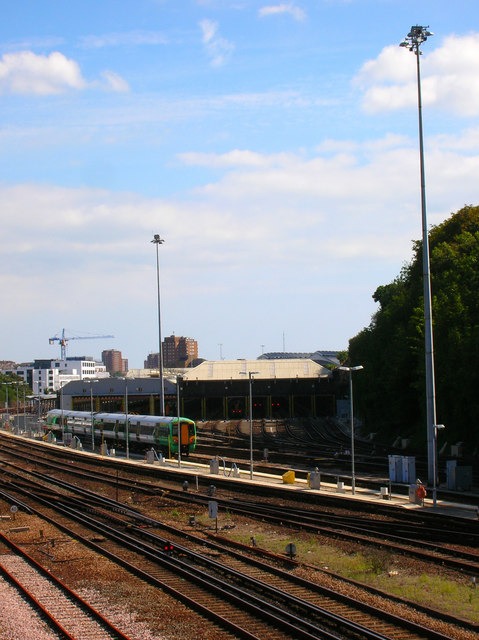
- The depot adjacent to the main line
- Interactive map of Brighton Lovers Walk Traction and Rolling Stock Maintenance Depot

Location
- Location: Brighton, East Sussex
- Coordinates: 50.8352°N 0.1457°W
- OS grid: TQ306056

Characteristics
- Owner: Southern Bombardier Transportation
- Depot code: BI (1973 -)
- Type: EMU

History
- Former depot code: 75A (1948 - May 1973); BTN; BTON

Brighton Lovers Walk Traction and Rolling Stock Maintenance Depot is a traction maintenance depot located in Brighton, East Sussex, England. The depot is situated adjacent to the Brighton Main Line and is to the north of Brighton station.

The depot code is BI.

== History ==
The depot was opened in 1848 as a carriage works by the LB&SCR, being converted in 1933 to an EMU depot by the Southern Railway. At that time, it had adjoining five and seven-track dead-ended buildings.

In 1987, the depot's allocation included class 421, 422 and 423 EMUs. Around the same time, the depot was also used to stable locomotives, including classes 09, 33, 47 and 73.

Modernisation resulted in the five-track building being reduced to a four-track from 2002, and the depot was reopened for servicing Class 377 units in 2006. A mix of Bombardier Transportation and Southern Railway technicians are based here.

== Allocation ==
The depot's allocation consists of Gatwick Express Class 387 EMUs and Southern Class 377 EMUs (subclasses /1 to /4). Southern's former Class 313 EMUs were also allocated to the depot until their retirement in 2023.

== Bibliography ==
- Marsden, Colin J. (1987). BR Depots. Motive power recognition. Vol. 6. Ian Allan Ltd. ISBN 9780711017191. OCLC 18685680.
- Smith, Paul; Stuart, Philip (2010). Railway Depots. Ian Allan Ltd. ISBN 9780711034822. OCLC 528397749.
- Webster, Neil; Greengrass, Robert; Greaves, Simon (1987). British Rail Depot Directory. Metro Enterprises Ltd. ISBN 9780947773076. OCLC 20420397.
