= RT Rail =

British railway company

RT Rail was a small British railway spot-hire company, a subsidiary of Ealing Community Transport (ECT), that specialised in Class 08 shunting locomotives. It was sold in 2008 to British American Railway Services along with ECT's other rail assets. It is now part of the locomotive hire division of their subsidiary company, RMS Locotec. Its fleet was available to hire to both industrial and railway operators. Customers included Bombardier Transportation at Ilford EMU Depot, Freightliner, First ScotRail at Inverness, and Silverlink. The company also owned two Class 73 locomotives, and a single Class 20 locomotive which was placed on loan to the Weardale Railway.
