= British Rail Class 414 =

1956 British electric trains

British Rail Class 414 2 HAP
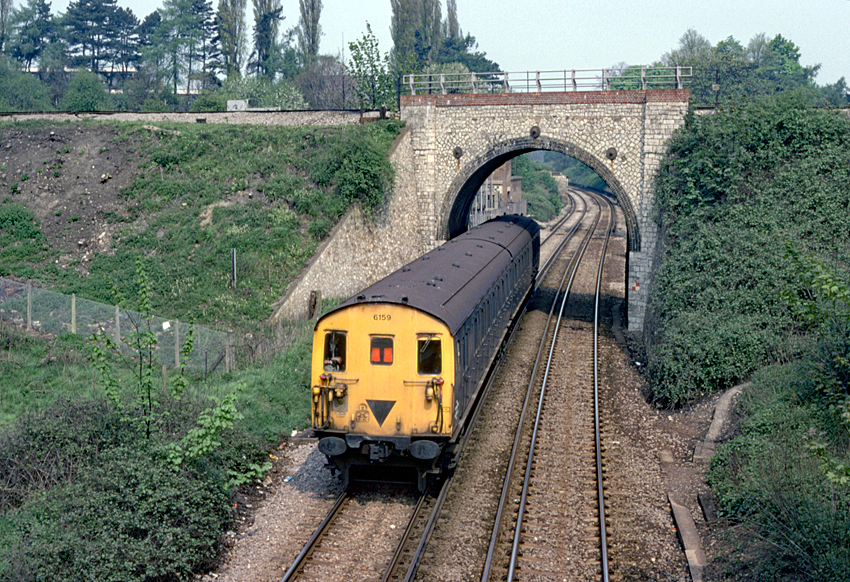
- 6159 heading north from Maidstone Barracks in 1980
- In service: 1956-1995
- Manufacturer: BR Eastleigh Works
- Order no.: BR: 30314 (DMBSO, 65393-65396); 30316 (DTCsoL, 77115-77118); 30319 (DMBSO, 65397-65403); 30320 (DTCsoL, 77119-77125); 30388 (DMBSO, 65404-65434); 30389 (DTCsoL, 77126-77156); 30452 (DMBSO, 61241-61303); 30453 (DTCsoL, 75361-75423); 30617 (DMBSO, 61648-61688); 30618 (DTCsoL, 75700-75740); 30711 (DMBSO, 61962-61988); 30712 (DTCsoL, 75995-76021)
- Replaced: Class 402
- Constructed: 1956-1963
- Entered service: 1957
- Number built: 209
- Formation: Two cars per trainset: DMBSO+DTCsoL
- Diagram: BR: EB269 or BR400 (DMBSO); EB270 or BR400 (DMBSO); EB279 (65405, refurbished); EE361 or BR441 (DTCsoL)
- Design code: 2 HAP
- Fleet numbers: SR design: 5601-5636 (414/1, sets); BR design: 6001-6042, later 42xx (414/2, sets); 6043-6173, later 43xx (414/3, sets); 14521-14556, 61241-61303, 61648-61688, 61962-61988, 65393-65434 (DMBS); 16001-16036, 75361-75423, 75700-75740, 75995-76021, 77115-77156 (DTC)
- Capacity: SR: 18F/122S (total); 84S (DMBS); 18F/38S (DTC); BR: 19F/134S (total); 84S (DMBS); 19F/50S (DTC)
- Operators: British Rail
- Depots: East Wimbledon; Ramsgate
- Lines served: Southern Region

Specifications
- Car body construction: Steel
- Train length: SR: 129 ft 6 in (39.47 m); BR: 132 ft 8 1/2 in (40.450 m)
- Car length: SR: 62 ft 6 in (19.05 m); BR: 63 ft 11 1/2 in (19.495 m)
- Width: 9 ft 3 in (2.819 m)
- Height: SR: 12 ft 9 1/2 in (3.899 m); BR: 12 ft 9 1/4 in (3.893 m)
- Entry: BR: 3 ft 9 in (1.14 m)
- Doors: Slam
- Wheelbase: BR: 46 ft 6 in (14.17 m) (bogie centres); 8 ft 9 in (2.67 m) (motor bogie); 8 ft 6 in (2.59 m) (others)
- Maximum speed: BR: 90 mph (140 km/h)
- Weight: SR: 40 t (39 long tons; 44 short tons) (DMBSO); 32 t (31 long tons; 35 short tons); BR: 42 t (41 long tons; 46 short tons) (DMBSO); 32.5 t (32.0 long tons; 35.8 short tons) (DTCsoL)
- Traction motors: Two EE507
- Power output: 2 x 250 hp (186 kW); 500 hp (373 kW)
- HVAC: Electric
- Electric system(s): 750/850 V DC third rail
- Current collection: Contact shoe
- UIC classification: Bo′2′+2′2′
- Bogies: SR: SR; BR: Commonwealth (inner), mk3 (outer) (sets, 6112-6141); Mk4 (others)
- Braking system(s): Air (EP/Auto)
- Coupling system: Buckeye (outer); 3 link (inner)
- Multiple working: 1951, 1957, 1963, 1966 SR Emus
- Track gauge: 1,435 mm (4 ft 8 1/2 in) standard gauge

The British Rail Class 414 (2 HAP) were two-car electric multiple units that were built between 1956 and 1963. They were withdrawn in 1995.

== History ==
The class formed part of the Southern Region's express fleet, and were fitted with the standard 90 mph (140 km/h) express gear ratio, for such units. This was primarily because a number of their duties involved working in multiple with the 4 CEP Express fleet, also of 90 mph maximum speed. Three batches (209 units) were built.

The class was built in two different styles, the first style was to the newer standard Mark 1 coach profile, in two batches from June 1957 onwards, and were numbered 6001–6042 and 6043–6173 respectively. Both of these batches were formed DMBSO + DTCsoL, as opposed to the DTCK in the second style. The DMBSO vehicles were to Diagram 400, the same as in the BR-designed Southern Region 2 EPB units, and orders in the second batch consisted of vehicles for both unit types. From 1974, 51 units had their first class accommodation downgraded to second class. They were also reclassified as 2-SAP and renumbered 5901–5951. They were converted back to their original configuration in 1980 (with the exception of one disbanded in 1978 due to accident damage) when many of these two later batches of units were reformed to class 413/2 and 413/3 4-CAP units. 5951 was again converted back to a 2-SAP in 1982.

The second style of thirty-six units was built from 1958 onwards on the reclaimed underframes of older 2 NOL units, to the old SR-style Bulleid design and numbered in the range 5601–5636. These units had the formation Driving Motor Brake Open Second (DMBSO) + Driving Trailer Composite with lavatory (DTCK). In 1969, the first class seating in 12 units was downgraded in the DTCKL, becoming DTSK. The units were then reclassified as 2-SAP. First class was restored in 1970 and they regained their former identities. All were withdrawn by 1982, with the DMBSO getting refurbished and integrated into the class 415 refurbishment programme. The DTSKs were scrapped.

With the introduction of yellow warning panels from late 1963 the motor coaches of all Southern Region 2 and 3-car units were equipped with an inverted black triangle in order to provide an early visual indication to station staff that there was no brake van at the other end of the unit. As units such the 4 CAP stock had a brake van at each end of the unit they were not so equipped.

In compliance with the TOPS numbering system, surviving units from the range 6001–6042 were renumbered into the 42xx series (class 414/2); the surviving units of 6043–6173 became 43xx (class 414/3).

Withdrawals of the class began in 1982 and modernisation of the units began in 1983, when 10 DMBSO from withdrawn units were converted for use on the Gatwick Express service in conjunction with converted loco-hauled Open First (FO) and Open Second (SO) vehicles and class 73 locomotives. These vehicles were classified as Class 489 with "units" numbered 9101–9110 and individual carriage numbers 68500–68509.

== Accidents and incidents ==
- On 16 November 1970, a unit of the class was derailed at London Bridge.
- On 26 February 1971, a train formed by five units of the class overran the buffers at Sheerness-on-Sea, Kent. One person was killed and ten were injured.

== Preservation ==
Two complete units have been preserved; (with a further four driving motor coaches, see Class 489):

Table of preserved units
Unit number (current in bold)			DMBSO	DTCso	Built	Livery	Location
**4308**	-	-	61275	75395	1958 Eastleigh	Network South East on one side, BR Blue on the other.	National Railway Museum
**4311**	-	-	61287	75407	1958 Eastleigh	Network South East	Darley Dale, Peak Rail, Derbyshire
