= British Rail Class 413 =

Class of British electric multiple unit

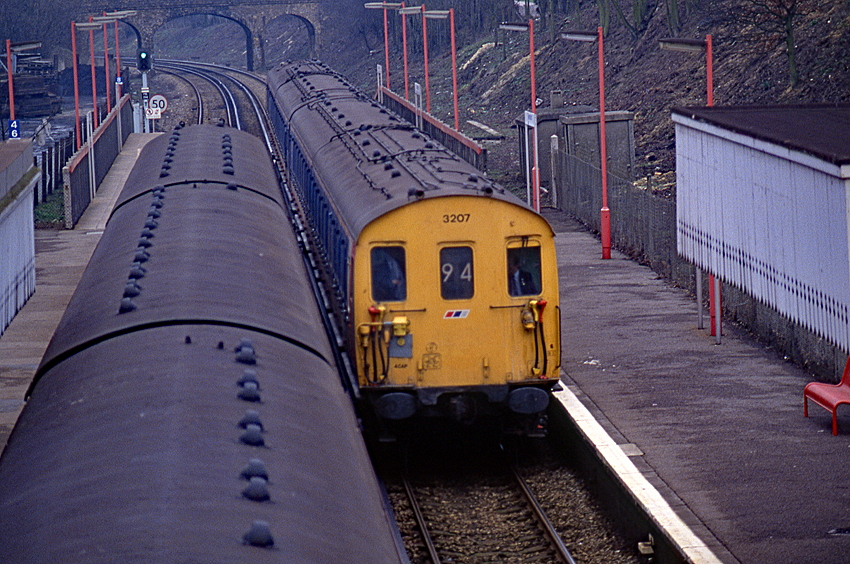
- 4-CAP 3207 at Bearsted in 1991
- In service: 1982–1995
- Manufacturer: BR Eastleigh
- Number built: 29 four car units, converted from 58 2 HAP units; built 1957
- Formation: DTCsoL - DMBSO - DMLSO - DTCsoL
- Operator: British Rail

Specifications
- Car length: 19.49 m (63 ft 11 3/8 in)
- Width: 2.82 m (9 ft 3 in)
- Maximum speed: 90 mph (140 km/h)
- Weight: Total 144 tonnes (142 long tons; 159 short tons)
- Braking system: Air (EP/Auto)

The British Rail Class 413 (or 4-CAP) units were formed from 1982 by permanently coupling two Class 414 2-HAP units together.

== History ==
The British Rail Class 413 (or 4-CAP) units were formed from 1982 by permanently coupling two Class 414 2-HAP units together, initially for East and West Coastway services from Brighton. There were two sub-classes of units: class 413/2, units 3201–3213, converted in 1982 from phase 1 2 HAP units 6001–6049. These units were formed DTCsoL - MBSO - MBSO - DTCsoL, with the former driving equipment of the DMBSO decommissioned, giving the new designation; and class 413/3, converted from the later phase 2 build units 6050–6173, units 3301–3311 (formed 1982, again with the MBSOs innermost) and 3321–3325 (formed 1991, with the DMBSO outermost giving the formation, DMBSO - TCsoL - TCsoL - DMBSO. The centre vehicles again had their driving equipment decommissioned.

== Fleet list ==
Class 413/2	Former 2-HAP Units	DTCsoL	MBSO	MLSO	DTCsoL
3201	6006 + 6009	77120	65398	65401	77123
3202	6004 + 6020	77118	65396	65412	77134
3203	6003 + 6032	77117	65395	65424	77146
3204	6018 + 6028	77132	65410	65420	77142
3205	6021 + 6030	77135	65413	65422	77144
3206	6027 + 6031	77141	65419	65423	77145
3207	6012 + 6036	77126	65404	65428	77150
3208	6033 + 6037	77147	65425	65429	77151
3209	6015 + 6038	77129	65407	65430	77152
3210	6010 + 6042	77124	65402	65434	77156
3211	6001 + 6035	77115	65393	65427	77149
3212	6014 + 6041	77128	65406	65433	77155
3213	6005 + 6040	77119	65397	65432	77154

Eleven Class 413/3 unit were converted in 1982 from 'Phase 2' 2-HAP units (6043–6173, later reclassified as Class 414/3). Units were marshalled with the driving motor vehicles in the centre.

Class 413/3	Former 2-HAP Units	DTCsoL	DMBSO	DMLSO	DTCsoL
3301	6055 + 6057	75373	61253	61255	75375
3302	6043 + 6046	75361	61241	61244	75364
3303	6052 + 6054	75370	61250	61252	75372
3304	6084 + 6085	75402	61282	61283	75403
3305	6081 + 6104	75399	61279	61302	75422
3306	6056 + 6058	75374	61254	61256	75376
3307	6060 + 6073	75378	61258	61271	75391
3308	6048 + 6066	75366	61246	61264	75384
3309	6053 + 6059	75371	61251	61257	75377
3310	6045 + 6061	75363	61243	61259	75379
3311	6093 + 6099	75411	61291	61297	75417

In 1991 a further five units (3321–3325) were converted from 'Phase 2' 2-HAP units (by now renumbered into the range 4301–4322). These units had the driving motors marshalled outermost.

Class 413/3	Former 2-HAP Units	DMBSO	DTCsoL	DTCsoL	DMBSO
3321	4305 + 4310 (ex-6070 + 6080)	61268	75388	75398	61278
3322	4314 + 4315 (ex-6064 + 6097)	61262	75382	75415	61295
3323	4307 + 4318 (ex-6075 + 6102)	61273	75393	75420	61300
3324	4306 + 4319 (ex-6072 + 6105)	61270	75390	75423	61303
3325	4303 + 4317 (ex-6063 + 6100)	61261	75381	75418	61298

== Withdrawal ==
The final units were withdrawn in 1994/95. None survived into preservation.
