= B1 class =

B1 class or Class B1 may refer to:

- B1-class Melbourne tram
- Barry Railway Class B1, 0-6-2T steam locomotives
- Finnish Steam Locomotive Class B1, 0-4-2ST steam locomotives
- LB&SCR B1 class, 0-4-2 steam locomotives
- LCDR B1 class, 0-6-0 steam locomotives
- LNER Class B1 (disambiguation)
- LNER Thompson Class B1, 4-6-0 steam locomotives
- NER Class B1, 0-6-2 steam locomotives
- Pennsylvania Railroad class B1, electric locomotives
