= Locomotive Services Limited =

Train operating company in Great Britain

- Founded: 2018
- Headquarters: Crewe, Cheshire, England
- Area served: Great Britain
- Services: Train operating company
- Owner: Jeremy Hosking
- Website: www.locomotiveservices.co.uk

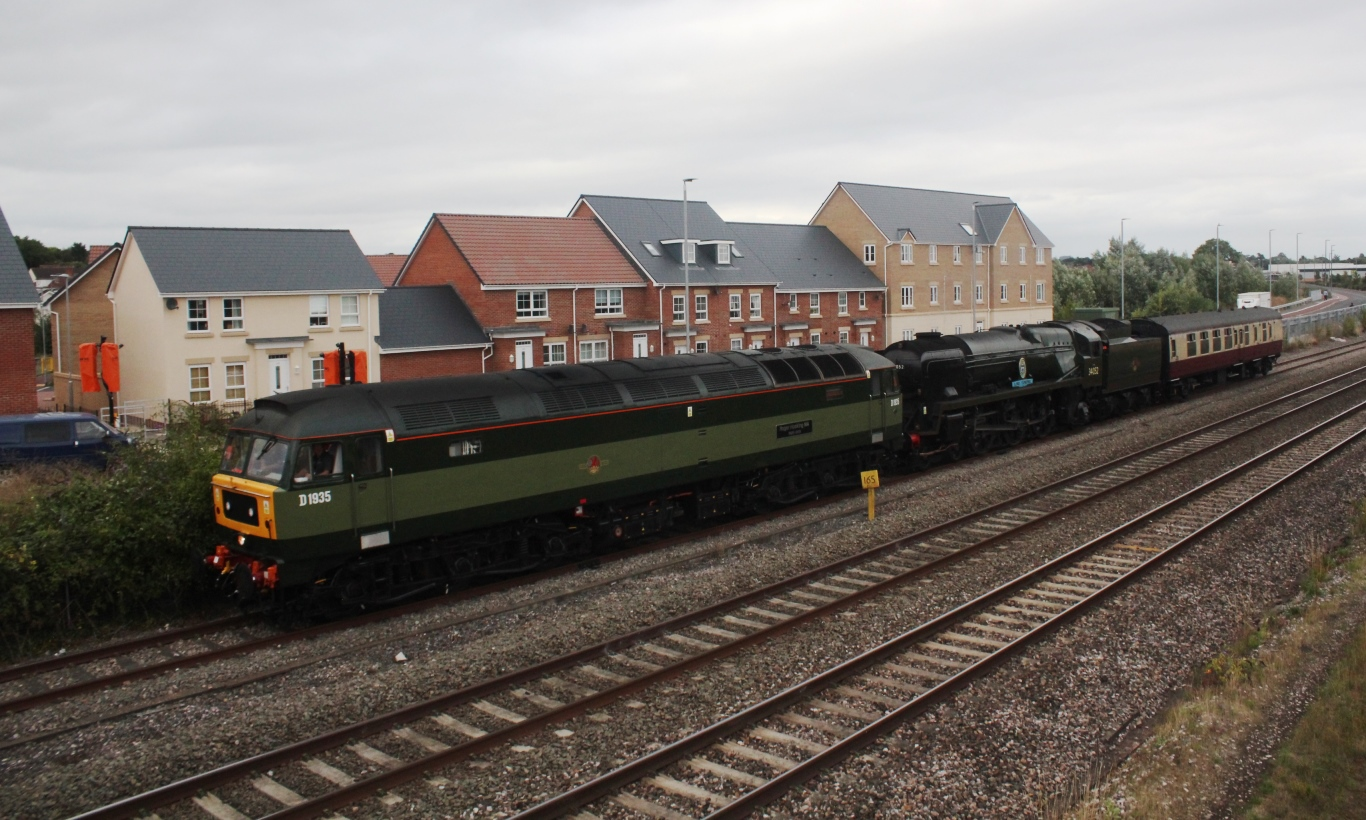
D1935 moving 34046 Braunton to the West Somerset Railway in 2018

Locomotive Services Limited is a train operating company in Great Britain. The company operates rail tours using heritage steam, diesel and electric locomotives, with support from associated companies and trusts.

== History ==
In August 2017, Locomotive Services Limited (LSL) was granted an operating licence by the Office of Rail & Road allowing it to operate main line trains in the Great Britain. Based at Crewe Diesel TMD, it is owned by Jeremy Hosking. It operated its first tour from Crewe to Kingussie in March 2018.

It built up a fleet of Class 08s, 37s and 47s, acquired mainly from Direct Rail Services. In December 2017, it purchased two Class 55s: D9000 and D9016. The former was restored at Locomotive Services' Crewe depot, whilst the latter has been cosmetically restored and transferred to the company's One:One Collection facility in Margate, Kent.

In August 2018, preserved Class 40 no. D213 Andania joined Locomotive Services on a three-year lease. In 2020, a Class 86, Class 87, two Class 90s and an InterCity 125 set were purchased.

== Related companies, brands and trusts ==
Hosking formed Locomotive Services under Royal Scot Locomotive and General Trust (RSLGT), a company dedicated to the maintenance and operation of steam locomotives owned by the trust, and also a number of other engines owned by him. The company operated initially from a main base at Southall Railway Centre and also a summer outpost at Bristol Barton Hill.

=== Locomotive Diesels Ltd ===
Already formed under Locomotive Services to handle operations and maintenance of RSLGT's stock of Class 47 locomotives, which were purchased to assist and move both steam locomotives and coaching stock around the network, the division took more prominence after Hosking agreed to acquire two Deltic locomotives in November 2017. In January 2018, Locomotive Services announced that they had taken out a three-year loan agreement on Class 40 locomotive no. D213 to operate on the main line in the later half of 2018.

=== Locomotive Storage Ltd ===
After acquiring the former Hornby factory in Margate, the Trust formed Locomotive Storage Ltd, to enable safe and weather-secure storage of locomotives awaiting overhaul, away from the busy main site at Crewe. After refurbishment and the installation of seven tracks (the site is only accessible by road), the first stock to arrive on the site was a Class 503 electric multiple unit in May 2018, followed by former LNER Class A4 4464 Bittern on 1 June 2018.

=== Train operating company ===
In August 2017, the associated company Locomotive Services (TOC) Ltd obtained the required certifications, licence and agreements to become a train operating company (TOC), enabling the company to operate trains on the British main line network. The first tour was operated from Crewe to Kingussie in March 2018. It subsequently created the associated company Saphos Trains, which runs tours and excursions, starting and ending mainly from Crewe station. Two Class 90 electric locomotives and an InterCity 125 set were purchased from Porterbrook.

=== Steam Dreams railway company ===
In June 2022, it was announced that Locomotive Services had purchased Steam Dreams and LNER Thompson Class B1 61306 Mayflower from former owner David Buck. Steam Dreams now operates under the LSL umbrella.

== Fleet ==
The Crewe-based fleet includes steam, diesel and electric locomotives.

Note: Bold represents current numbers.

=== Steam locomotives ===
Not all steam locomotives listed below are owned by RSLGT/Locomotive Services, as some are operating with Locomotive Services under an agreement. Not all are also main line certified, so are restricted to 25 mph (40 km/h) on heritage railways; main line permitted speed listed below:

Number	Name	Class	Livery	Owner	Tops no.	Max speed	Air brks	Location	Photograph	Present status	Main line certified	Notes
4270		GWR 4200 Class 2-8-0T	GWR Lined Green		N/A	25 mph (50 mph)	No	Kent and East Sussex Railway		Under overhaul	No	Being overhauled by 4253 Locomotive Company as part of 10-year loan agreement
5029	Nunney Castle	GWR "Castle" 4-6-0	GWR Lined Green		98728	75 mph	Yes	LNWR Heritage, Crewe		Operational	Yes (2025-ongoing)	Returned to main line services in 2025 after overhaul.
6024	King Edward I	GWR "King" 4-6-0	BR Green, Late Crest (on completion)	Royal Scot Locomotive and General Trust	98824	75 mph	Yes	LNWR Heritage, Crewe		Operational	Yes (2026-ongoing)	Maintained and operated by 6024 Preservation Society.
6960	Raveningham Hall	GWR Modified Hall 4-6-0	GWR Lined Green		98560	25 mph (60 mph)	No	One:One Collection		Awaiting overhaul	No	Boiler ticket expired in July 2021. Moved to Margate in September 2021
34046	Braunton	SR "West Country" 4-6-2	BR Green, Late Crest	Royal Scot Locomotive and General Trust	98746	75 mph	Yes	Bishops Lydeard		Operational	Yes (20##-ongoing)	
35022	Holland America Line	SR "Merchant Navy" 4-6-2	N/A	Royal Scot Locomotive and General Trust	98822	75 mph	N/A	LNWR Heritage, Crewe		Stored	No	Awaiting restoration from scrapyard condition.
35027	Port Line	SR "Merchant Navy" 4-6-2	BR Green, Late Crest	Royal Scot Locomotive and General Trust	98827	75 mph	N/A	LNWR Heritage, Crewe		Stored	No	Awaiting major overhaul; to be fitted with boiler from 35022.
45231	The Sherwood Forester	LMS Stanier Class 5 4-6-0	BR Black, Late Crest		98531	60 mph	Yes	LNWR Heritage, Crewe		Awaiting overhaul	Yes (2013-ongoing)	
46100	Royal Scot	LMS "Royal Scot" 4-6-0	BR Green, Early Emblem	Royal Scot Locomotive and General Trust	98702	75 mph	Yes	One:One Collection		Static display	Yes (2016 - ongoing)	Stored at Margate since February 2025
60007	Sir Nigel Gresley	LNER A4 4-6-2	BR Blue	Sir Nigel Gresley Locomotive Trust	98898	75 mph	Yes	LNWR Heritage, Crewe		Operational	Yes (2022-ongoing)	On ten-year partnership with SNGLT. Worked inaugural post-overhaul railtour on 21 May 2022.
60019	Bittern	LNER A4 4-6-2	LNER Garter Blue		98819	75 mph	Yes			Under Overhaul	No	Moved from the One:One Collection in February 2025
60532	Blue Peter	LNER A2 4-6-2	BR Blue	Royal Scot Locomotive and General Trust	98832	75 mph	Yes	LNWR Heritage, Crewe		Operational	Yes (2024 - ongoing)	60532 made its debut return to the main line in May 2024, undertaking its loaded test run on 2 May 2024.
61306	Mayflower	LNER B1 4-6-0	BR Apple Green	Locomotive Services Group	98506	75 mph	Yes	LNWR Heritage, Crewe		Operational	Yes (2019-ongoing)	Acquired in June 2022 from David Buck.
70000	Britannia	BR Standard Class 7 4-6-2	BR Green, Late Crest	Royal Scot Locomotive and General Trust	98700	75 mph	Yes	LNWR Heritage, Crewe		Operational	Yes (2022 - ongoing)	Withdrawn for repairs to motion following failure of its crosshead on 22 August 2023. Returned to service in March 2024 following completion of repairs.
71000	Duke of Gloucester	BR Standard Class 8 4-6-2	BR Green, Late Crest	BR Class 8 Steam Locomotive Trust	98800	75 mph	Yes	Tyseley Locomotive Works	Hugh llewelyn 71000 (5363549903)	Operational	Yes (2025-ongoing)	In February 2024, it was announced that the BR Class 8 Steam Locomotive Trust and the Royal Scot Locomotive & General Trust had formed a partnership that will see the operation of 71000 on the main line, after its overhaul is complete. 71000 operated its first train since its overhaul on 6 November 2025.
92212		BR Standard Class 9F 2-10-0	BR Black, Late Crest		N/A	25 mph (50 mph)	No	Mid-Hants Railway		Under overhaul	No	The entire 9F class is banned from main line running, due to flangeless centre wheels. Withdrawn for ten-year overhaul in late 2019.

=== Diesel locomotives ===
The locomotives owned by Locomotive Services Ltd and Royal Scot Locomotive & General Trust are listed below.

Note: Marked names indicate that the locomotive is not presently wearing them.

==== Shunters ====
Class	Pre-TOPS number	TOPS number	Name	Livery	Owner	Image	Currently based at	Current status
Class 08	D3598	**08483**	Bungle	BR Black	Locomotive Services Ltd		LNWR Heritage, Crewe	
Class 08	D3798	**08631**	-	BR Blue	Locomotive Services Ltd		LNWR Heritage, Crewe	Operational. Returned to Crewe, following contract repair work undertaken by RMS Locotec. Use as a pilot at the LNWR Heritage site.
Class 08	**D3905**	08737	-	BR Green	Locomotive Services Ltd		Locomotive Services Southall	
Class 08	**D3948**	08780	Zippy	BR Green	Locomotive Services Ltd		LNWR Heritage, Crewe	

==== Main line ====
The operational main line diesel fleet is based entirely at Crewe Diesel Depot. Some locomotives are off-site either in storage, on hire or under restoration.

Class	Pre-TOPS number	TOPS number	Name	Livery	Owner	Image	Currently based at	Current status
Class 20	**D8096**	20096	-	BR Green	Locomotive Services Ltd	20096 & 20107 1Z20	LNWR Heritage, Crewe	
Class 20	**D8107**	20107	Jocelyn Feilding 1940–2020	BR Green	Locomotive Services Ltd	20107 & 20096 1Z21	LNWR Heritage, Crewe	
Class 20	D8118	**20118**	Saltburn-by-the-Sea	BR Railfreight Red Stripe	Locomotive Services Ltd	20118 and 20132, Tonbridge West Yard to Peterborough 0Z20	LNWR Heritage, Crewe	
Class 20	D8132	**20132**	-	BR Railfreight Red Stripe	Locomotive Services Ltd	Derby Etches Park open day 51	LNWR Heritage, Crewe	
Class 37	D6890	**37190**	-	BR Blue	Locomotive Services Ltd		One:One Collection	Stopped due to an engine fault in 2020, while at the Severn Valley Railway. Moved to Margate in August 2021.
Class 37	D6968	**37401**	Mary Queen of Scots	ScotRail	Locomotive Services Ltd	20160822 DRS 37401 Lancaster	LNWR Heritage, Crewe	Returned to service in 2025 after major exam carried out by DRS. Latest sighting is September 16, 2026.
Class 37	D6970	**37409**	-	ScotRail	Locomotive Services Ltd	General Railway Pictures 2019 422	LNWR Heritage, Crewe	
Class 37	**D6817**	37521	-	BR Green	Locomotive Services Ltd	Plymouth - Locomotive Services D6817	LNWR Heritage, Crewe	
Class 37	**D6851**	37667	Flopsie	BR Green	Locomotive Services Ltd	Plymouth - Locomotive Services D6851	LNWR Heritage, Crewe	
Class 45	D67	**45118**	The Royal Artilleryman	BR Blue	Royal Scot Locomotive and General Trust		Barrow Hill Roundhouse	
Class 47	**D1944**	47501	Craftsman	BR Green	Locomotive Services Ltd		LNWR Heritage, Crewe	
Class 47	D1973	**47593**	Galloway Princess	BR Large Logo Blue	Locomotive Services Ltd		LNWR Heritage, Crewe	
Class 47	**D1935**	47805	Roger Hosking MA 1925-2013	BR Green	Locomotive Services Ltd		LNWR Heritage, Crewe	
Class 47	**D1924**	47810	Crewe Diesel Depot	BR Green	Locomotive Services Ltd		LNWR Heritage, Crewe	
Class 47	D1650	**47816**	-	Freightliner Green	Locomotive Services Ltd		LNWR Heritage, Crewe	Stored, spares donor
Class 47	D1645	**47830**	Beeching's Legacy	Freightliner Green	Locomotive Services Ltd		LNWR Heritage, Crewe	Acquired from Freightliner in mid-2024, to be overhauled and returned to operations
Class 47	D1726	**47841**	The Institution of Mechanical Engineers	BR InterCity	Locomotive Services Ltd		LNWR Heritage, Crewe	Stored, spares donor.
Class 47	**D1733**	47853	-	BR Blue	Locomotive Services Ltd		LNWR Heritage, Crewe	
Class 55	**D9016**	55016	Gordon Highlander	BR Green	Locomotive Services Ltd		One:One Collection	Static display. Acquired from former owners, alongside 55022, for use on main line railtours. Selected parts on loco (traction motors, engine, etc.) were taken off 55016 to be used on 55022 to return the engine to service. Following a cosmetic overhaul, the engine was moved to the One:One Collection museum in Margate, where it will be placed on display awaiting its turn in the overhaul queue.
Class 55	**D9000**	55022	Royal Scots Grey	BR Green	Locomotive Services Ltd		LNWR Heritage, Crewe	
Class 57	-	**57002**	Winston Churchill	LNWR Lined Black	Locomotive Services Ltd		LNWR Heritage, Crewe	
Class 57	-	**57003**	InterCity Railway Society 50th Anniversary 1973-2023	BR Railfreight Distribution	Locomotive Services Ltd			
Class 57	-	**57004**	-	Debranded DRS blue	Locomotive Services Ltd	57 004 at Witham 12	-	Sold to GWR for spares for their Class 57/6 fleet; the body shell was sold to and broken up by Watsons and Sons, Stafford, July 2023
Class 57	-	**57007**	-	Debranded DRS blue	Locomotive Services Ltd	Crewe DRS open day 2018 - 57007 (88002)	LNWR Heritage, Crewe	
Class 57	-	**57302**	Chad Varah	Debranded DRS blue	Locomotive Services Ltd		-	
Class 57	-	**57311**	The Institution of Mechanical Engineers	LNWR Lined Black	Locomotive Services Ltd		LNWR Heritage, Crewe	
Class 60	-	**60081**	Isambard Kingdom Brunel / Bleaklow Hill	GWR Green	Locomotive Services Ltd		One:One Collection, Margate	
Class 73	E6001	**73001**	-	BR Blue	Locomotive Services Ltd		Ecclesbourne Valley Railway	Purchased from the Dean Forest Railway in 2019

==== Class 43 (HST) power cars ====
Locomotive Services own nine Class 43 power cars, with seven currently in service. All power cars are used/to be used on the Midland Pullman luxury train service, with the exception of 43083.

Class	TOPS number	Name	Livery	Owner	Image	Currently based at	Current status
Class 43	43046	Geoff Drury 1930–1999; Steam Preservation and Computerised Track Recording Pioneer	Midland Pullman blue and white	Locomotive Services Ltd		LNWR Heritage, Crewe	Operational, main line registered. One of the first two power cars to be restored, as part of a recreation of the Blue Pullman train for charter use. One of two power cars fitted with a generator in the baggage compartment, used to power the fridges on the Pullman set. Acquired from Porterbrook in 2020, following its withdrawal from service with East Midlands Railway.
Class 43	43047	-	Midland Pullman blue and white	Locomotive Services Ltd		LNWR Heritage, Crewe	Operational, main line registered. Acquired from Porterbrook in 2021, following its withdrawal from service with East Midlands Railway in 2020.
Class 43	43049	Neville Hill	Midland Pullman blue and white	Locomotive Services Ltd	43049 leaving Macclesfield station, 18 October 2024	LNWR Heritage, Crewe	Operational, main line registered. Acquired from Porterbrook in 2021, following its withdrawal from service with East Midlands Railway in 2020. Repainted into Midland Pullman livery in 2023.
Class 43	43050	Loch Morar	Midland Pullman blue and white	Locomotive Services Ltd	LSL's 43050 on the West Highland Pullman 18 October 2024	LNWR Heritage, Crewe	Operational, main line registered. Acquired from Porterbrook in April 2024, following its withdrawal from service with East Midlands Railway in 2020. Repainted into Midland Pullman livery in 2024.
Class 43	43054	-	East Midlands Trains blue and orange	Locomotive Services Ltd		LNWR Heritage, Crewe	Damaged at Princes Risborough in April 2022. Designated by LSL as stored, October 2024.
Class 43	43055	-	Midland Pullman blue and white	Locomotive Services Ltd		LNWR Heritage, Crewe	Operational, main line registered. One of the first two power cars to be restored, as part of a recreation of the Blue Pullman train for charter use. One of two power cars fitted with a generator in the baggage compartment, used to power the fridges on the Pullman set. Acquired from Porterbrook in 2020, following its withdrawal from service with East Midlands Railway.
Class 43	43058	Loch Eil	Midland Pullman blue and white	Locomotive Services Ltd		LNWR Heritage, Crewe	Operational, main line registered. Named and repainted into Midland Pullman livery at Arlington Fleet Services, September 2024. Acquired from Porterbrook in 2020, following its withdrawal from service with East Midlands Railway.
Class 43	43059	-	Midland Pullman blue and white	Locomotive Services Ltd	43059 at Bridgwater, on the rear of a Crewe to Paignton empty coaching stock move	LNWR Heritage, Crewe	Operational, main line registered. Acquired from Porterbrook in 2020, following its withdrawal from service with East Midlands Railway.
Class 43	43083	-	East Midlands Trains blue and orange	Locomotive Services Ltd		Eastleigh Works	Stored, spares donor. Acquired from Porterbrook in 2020, following its withdrawal from service with East Midlands Railway.

==== On loan to LSL ====
Not all diesel locomotives used by Locomotive Services are owned by them; some are loaned to the company for use on railtours. The privately-owned locos are listed below:

Class	Pre-TOPS number	TOPS number	Name	Livery	Owner	Image	Currently based at	Current status
Class 37	D6905	**37688**	Great Rocks	Trainload Construction grey	D05 Preservation Ltd.		LNWR Heritage, Crewe	Operational, main line registered. On long-term hire from owners.
Class 40	**D213**	40013	Andania	BR Green	Private owner		LNWR Heritage, Crewe	Operational, main line registered. Recently returned to service following an overhaul and power unit replacement. After being located at Barrow Hill Roundhouse, the engine was moved to Crewe Diesel Depot in July 2018 for fitment of AWS, TPWS, On-Train Monitoring Recorder and GSM-R. On long-term loan to Locomotive Services from 2018.
Class 47	D1948	**47712**	Lady Diana Spencer	BR ScotRail (blue stripe)	Crewe Diesel Preservation Group		LNWR Heritage, Crewe	Owned by Crewe DPG. Used with the matching ScotRail push-pull set.
Class 47	D1966	**47828**	-	BR InterCity	D05 Preservation Ltd.		LNWR Heritage, Crewe	Operational, main line registered. Currently on hire to Locomotive Services from its owners, following the termination of its contract with West Coast Railways.
Class 50	**D400**	**50050**	Fearless	BR Blue	Boden Rail Engineering Limited		LNWR Heritage, Crewe	On long-term loan to LSL from Boden Rail Engineering, as from March 2024. Carries both 50050 and D400 numbers.

=== Diesel multiple units ===
Class	Pre-TOPS number	TOPS number	Name	Livery	Owner	Image	Currently based at	Current status
Class 121	**55022**		Flora	Blood & Custard Pullman	Locomotive Services Ltd		LNWR Heritage, Crewe	
Class 121	**55034**	121034	-	BR Green	Locomotive Services Ltd		Ecclesbourne Valley Railway	
Class 141	-	**141108**	-	BR Blue & Grey	Locomotive Services Ltd		Eastleigh Works	Purchased for display at One:One Collection.
Class 142	-	**142003**	-	Greater Manchester Passenger Transport Executive (orange and brown)	Locomotive Services Ltd		LNWR Heritage, Crewe	
Class 142	-	**142007**	-		Locomotive Services Ltd		Eastleigh Works	

=== Electric locomotives ===
Class	Pre-TOPS number	TOPS number	Name	Livery	Owner	Image	Current location	Current status
Class 86	E3191	**86101**	Sir William A Stanier FRS	InterCity Swallow	Locomotive Services Ltd		LNWR Heritage, Crewe	Operational, main line registered. Previously used on Caledonian Sleeper services, which included moving empty coaching stock between London Euston and Wembley Intercity Depot, as well as between Glasgow Central and Polmadie TRSMD; on occasions, they would haul the sleeper itself. Both were purchased from the AC Locomotive Group by Locomotive Services in November 2019, for use on charter trains.
Class 86	E3191	86201	Sir William A Stanier FRS	InterCity Swallow	Locomotive Services Ltd		LNWR Heritage, Crewe	Operational, main line registered. Previously used on Caledonian Sleeper services, which included moving empty coaching stock between London Euston and Wembley Intercity Depot, as well as between Glasgow Central and Polmadie TRSMD; on occasions, they would haul the sleeper itself. Both were purchased from the AC Locomotive Group by Locomotive Services in November 2019, for use on charter trains.
Class 87	-	**87002**	Royal Sovereign	InterCity Swallow	Locomotive Services Ltd		LNWR Heritage, Crewe	Operational, main line registered. Previously used on Caledonian Sleeper services, which included moving empty coaching stock between London Euston and Wembley Intercity Depot, as well as between Glasgow Central and Polmadie TRSMD; on occasions, they would haul the sleeper itself. Both were purchased from the AC Locomotive Group by Locomotive Services in November 2019, for use on charter trains.
Class 89	-	**89001**	Avocet	InterCity Swallow	AC Locomotive Group		Brush Works, Loughborough	Under overhaul. LSL entered a partnership with the owners of 89001 in December 2021, which saw its overhaul through to completion, before operating the locomotive for a period of five years.
Class 90	-	**90001**	Royal Scot	InterCity Swallow	Locomotive Services Ltd		LNWR Heritage, Crewe	
Class 90	-	**90002**	Wolf of Badenoch	InterCity Swallow	Locomotive Services Ltd		LNWR Heritage, Crewe	
