= British Rail Class 40 =

British class of diesel-electric locomotives

English Electric Type 4 British Rail Class 40
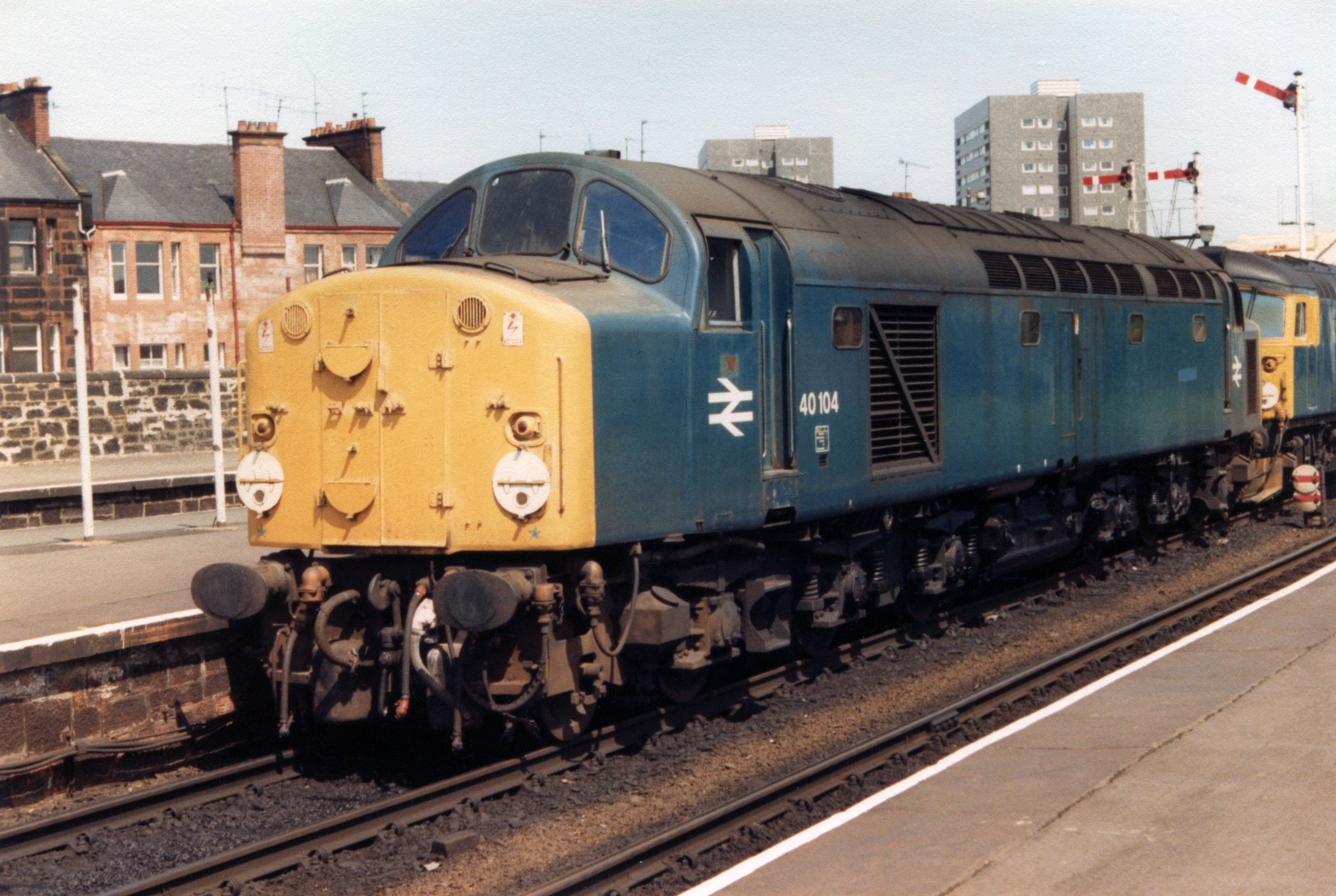
- A Class 40 at Ayr
Type and origin
- Power type: Diesel-electric
- Builder: English Electric at Vulcan Foundry (180); Robert Stephenson and Hawthorns (20)
- Build date: 1958–1962
- Total produced: 200
Specifications
- Configuration
  - UIC: (1′Co)(Co1′)
  - Commonwealth: 1Co-Co1
- Gauge: 4 ft 8 1/2 in (1,435 mm) standard gauge
- Wheel diameter: Driving: 3 ft 9 in (1.143 m); Idling: 3 ft 0 in (0.914 m)
- Minimum curve: 4.5 chains (91 m)
- Wheelbase: 61 ft 3 in (18.67 m)
- Length: 69 ft 6 in (21.18 m)
- Width: 9 ft 0 in (2.74 m)
- Height: 12 ft 10 in (3.91 m)
- Loco weight: 133 long tons (135 t; 149 short tons)
- Fuel capacity: 710 imp gal (3,200 L; 850 US gal)
- Lubricant cap.: 140 gal (636 l)
- Coolant cap.: 710 gal (3,250l)
- Prime mover: English Electric 16SVT MkII
- Engine type: V16 Diesel Engine
- Generator: DC generator English Electric 822/4C
- Traction motors: DC traction motors English Electric 526/5D or EE526/7D
- Transmission: Diesel-electric transmission
- MU working: ★ Blue Star
- Train heating: Steam
- Train brakes: Vacuum; later Dual (Air & Vacuum)
- Safety systems: AWS
Performance figures
- Maximum speed: 90 mph (140 km/h)
- Power output: Engine: 2,000 bhp (1,490 kW); At rail: 1,550 hp (1,160 kW)
- Tractive effort
  - Starting: Maximum: 52,000 lbf (231 kN) at 21.1% adhesion
  - Continuous: Continuous 30,900 lbf (137 kN) at 18 mph (29 km/h)
- Brakeforce: 51 long tons-force (508 kN)
Career
- Operators: British Rail
- Numbers: D200–D399, later 40 001–40 199
- Nicknames: Whistler
- Axle load class: Route availability 6
- Withdrawn: 1967 (1), 1976-1988
- Disposition: Seven preserved, remainder scrapped

The British Rail Class 40 is a type of railway diesel-electric locomotive. A total of 200 were built by English Electric between 1958 and 1962, numbered D200-D399. Despite their initial success, by the time the last examples were entering service, they were already being replaced on some top-level duties by more powerful locomotives. As they were slowly relegated from express passenger use, the type found work on secondary passenger and freight services which they hauled for many years. The final locomotives ended regular service in 1985. The locomotives were commonly known as "Whistlers" because of the distinctive noise made by their turbochargers.

== Origins ==
The origins of the Class 40 fleet lay in the prototype diesel locomotives LMS No. 10000 and 10001, ordered by the London, Midland and Scottish Railway; Class D16/2, ordered by British Railways between 1947 and 1954); and, most notably, with the Southern Region locomotive no. 10203, which was powered by English Electric's 16SVT MkII engine, developing 2,000 bhp (1,460 kW). The bogie design and power train of 10203 was used almost unchanged on the first ten production Class 40s.

== Prototypes ==
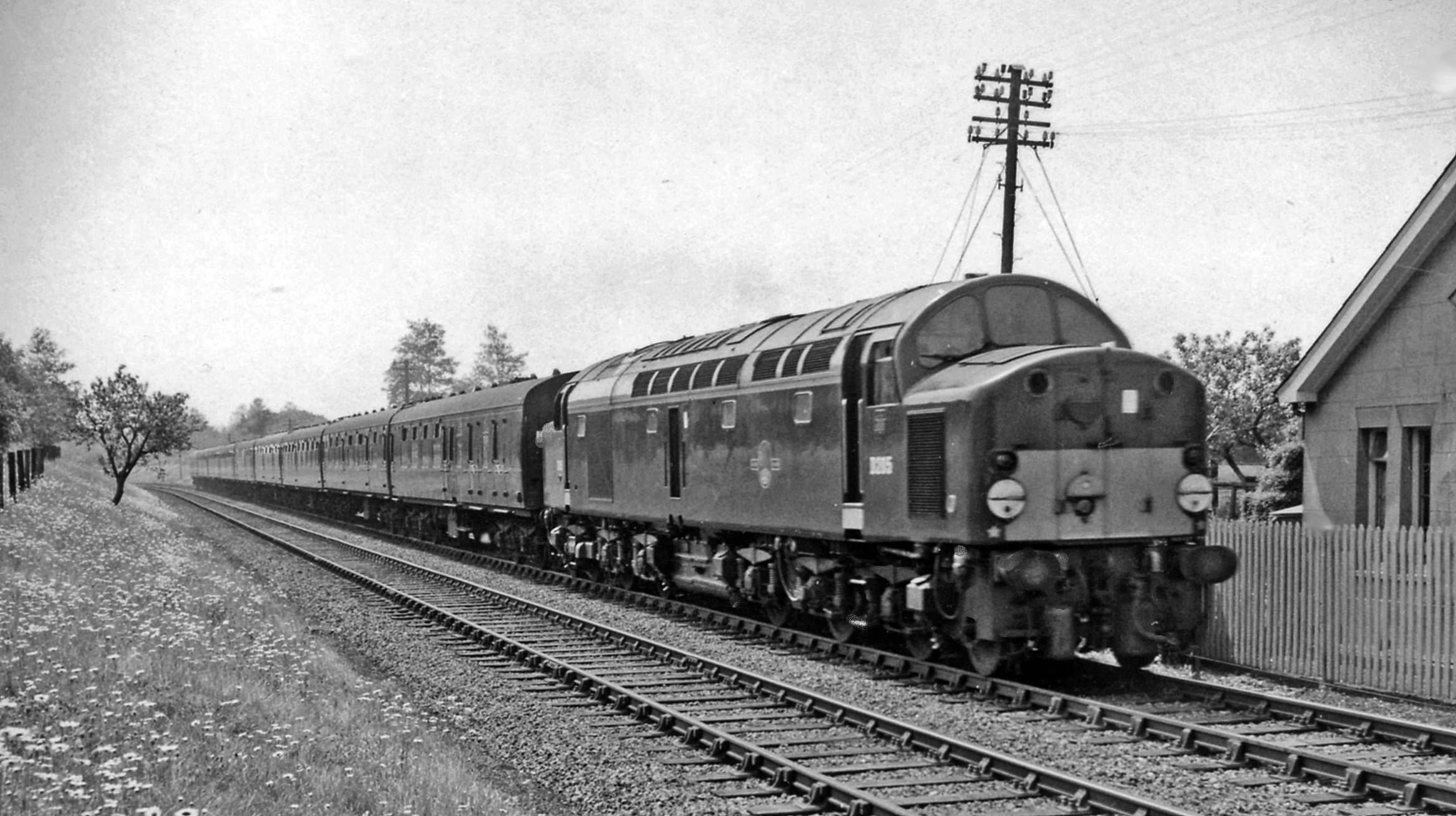
One of the prototype locomotives, D205, on the Great Eastern Main Line in 1963

British Railways originally ordered ten Class 40s, then known as English Electric Type 4s, as evaluation prototypes. They were built at the Vulcan Foundry in Newton-le-Willows, Lancashire. The first locomotive, D200, was delivered to Stratford Works on 14 March 1958. Following fitter and crew training, D200 made its passenger début on an express train from London Liverpool Street to Norwich on 18 April 1958. Five of the prototypes, nos. D200, D202-D205, were trialled on similar services on the former Great Eastern routes, whilst the remaining five, nos. D201, D206-D209, worked Great Northern services on the East Coast Main Line.

Sir Brian Robertson, then chairman of the British Transport Commission, was less than impressed; he believed that the locomotives lacked the power to maintain heavy trains at high speed and were too expensive to run in multiple – opinions that were later proved to be correct. Airing his views at the regional boards prompted others to break cover and it was agreed that later orders would be uprated to 2,500 hp (a change that was never applied). Direct comparisons on the Great Eastern Main Line showed they offered little advantage over the "Britannia" class steam locomotives when driven well, and the Eastern Region declined to accept further machines, as comparisons showed little performance advantages over the Class A4 steam locomotives on the East Coast Main Line, they preferred to hold on until the more powerful Class 55 "Deltics" were delivered.

The London Midland Region was only too pleased, as the Eastern Region's decision released additional locomotives to replace their ageing steam fleet. The West Coast Main Line had been starved of investment for many years and the poor track and generally lower speeds (when compared to the East Coast route) suited Class 40s, as the need to hold trains at speed for long periods simply did not exist and it better took advantage of their fairly rapid acceleration.

== Production ==
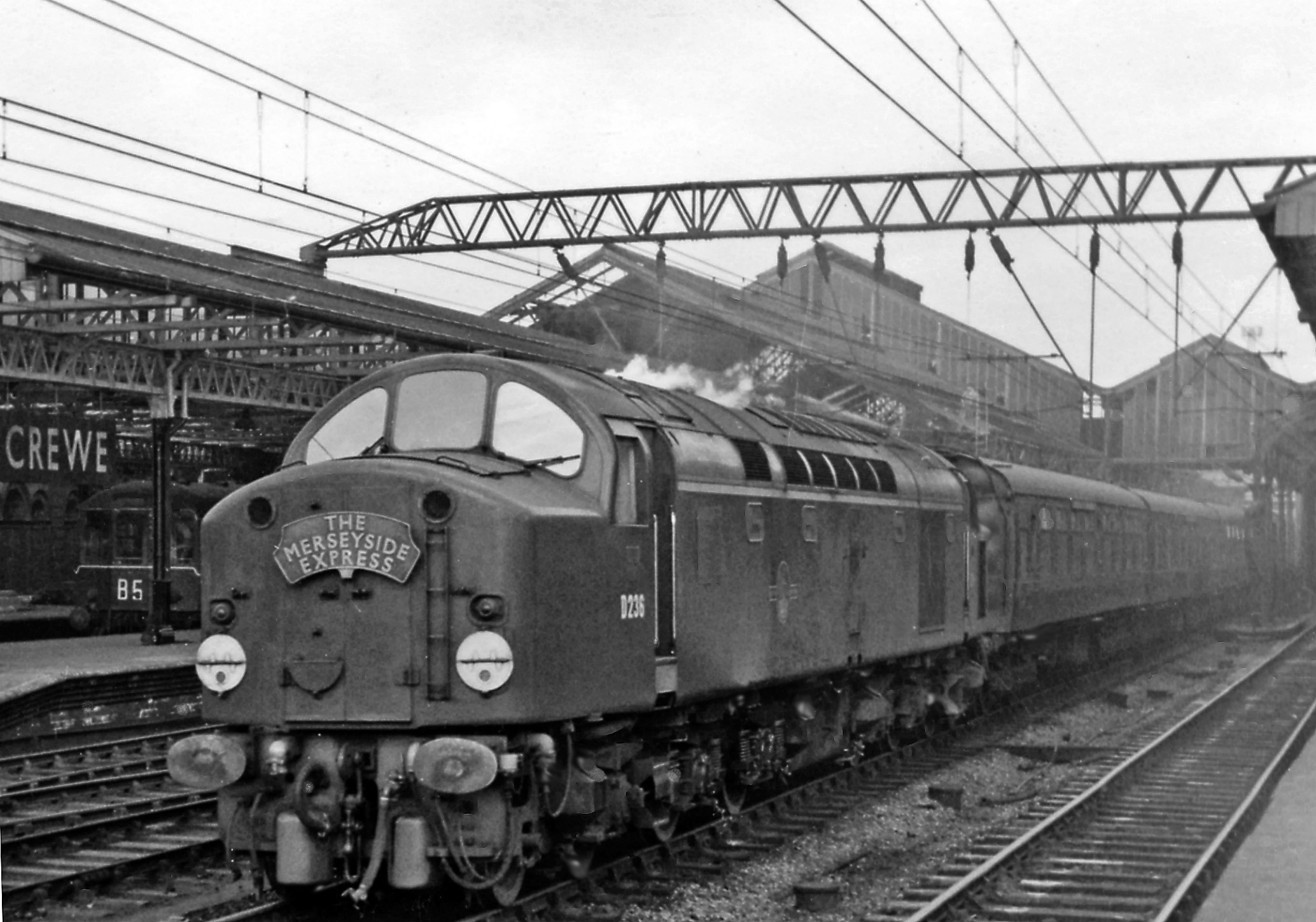
D236 with Merseyside Express at Crewe, in BR green with no warning panels (1960)

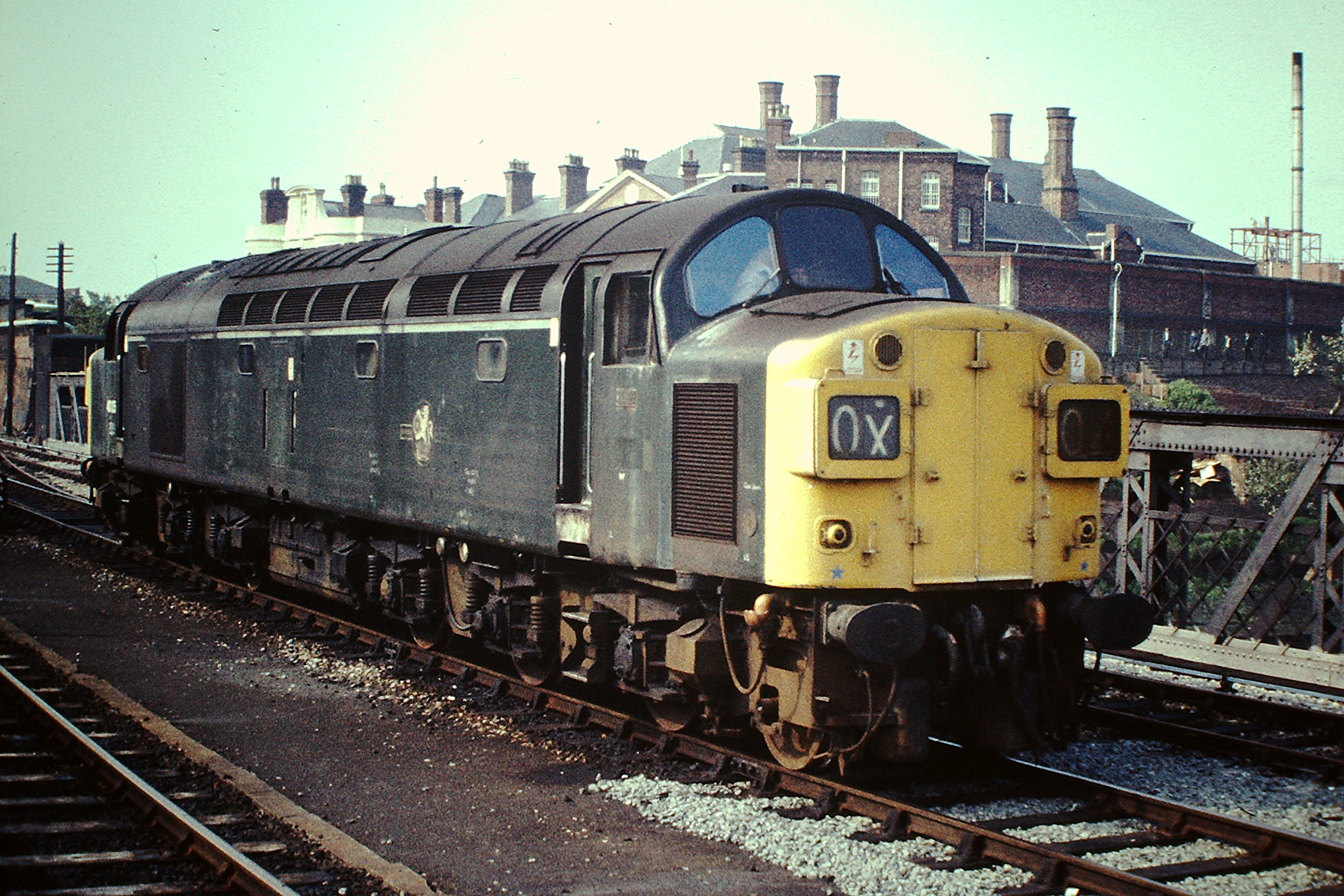
English Electric no. 40125 (ex-D325) in a badly faded BR green with all yellow front ends, gangway doors and split headcode panels at Shrewsbury General (1975)

Following the mixed success of the prototypes, another 190 locomotives were ordered by British Railways and were numbered from D210 to D399. All were built at Vulcan Foundry, except one batch of twenty (nos. D305–D324) which were built at Robert Stephenson and Hawthorns factory in Darlington. All the locomotives were painted in British Railways' diesel green livery and the final locomotive, D399, was delivered in September 1962.

Batches of the class were built with significant design differences, due to changes in railway working practices. The first 125 locomotives, nos. D200–D324, were built with steam-age 'disc' headcode markers, which were used to identify services. Later, it was decided that locomotives should display the four character train reporting number (or headcode) of the service they were hauling; nos. D325–D344 were built with 'split' headcode boxes, which displayed two characters either side of the locomotive's central gangway doors.

Another policy decision led to discontinuation of the gangway doors, which enabled train crew to move between two or three locomotives in multiple. The remaining locomotives, nos. D345–D399, carried a central four-character headcode box. In 1965, seven of the first batch of locomotives, nos. D260–D266, which were based in Scotland, were converted to the central headcode design.

From 1973, locomotives were renumbered to suit the TOPS computer operating system and became known as Class 40. D201 to D399 were renumbered in sequence into the range 40001 to 40199. The first built locomotive, D200, was renumbered 40122; vacated by the scrapping of D322, following accident damage.

== Named locomotives ==
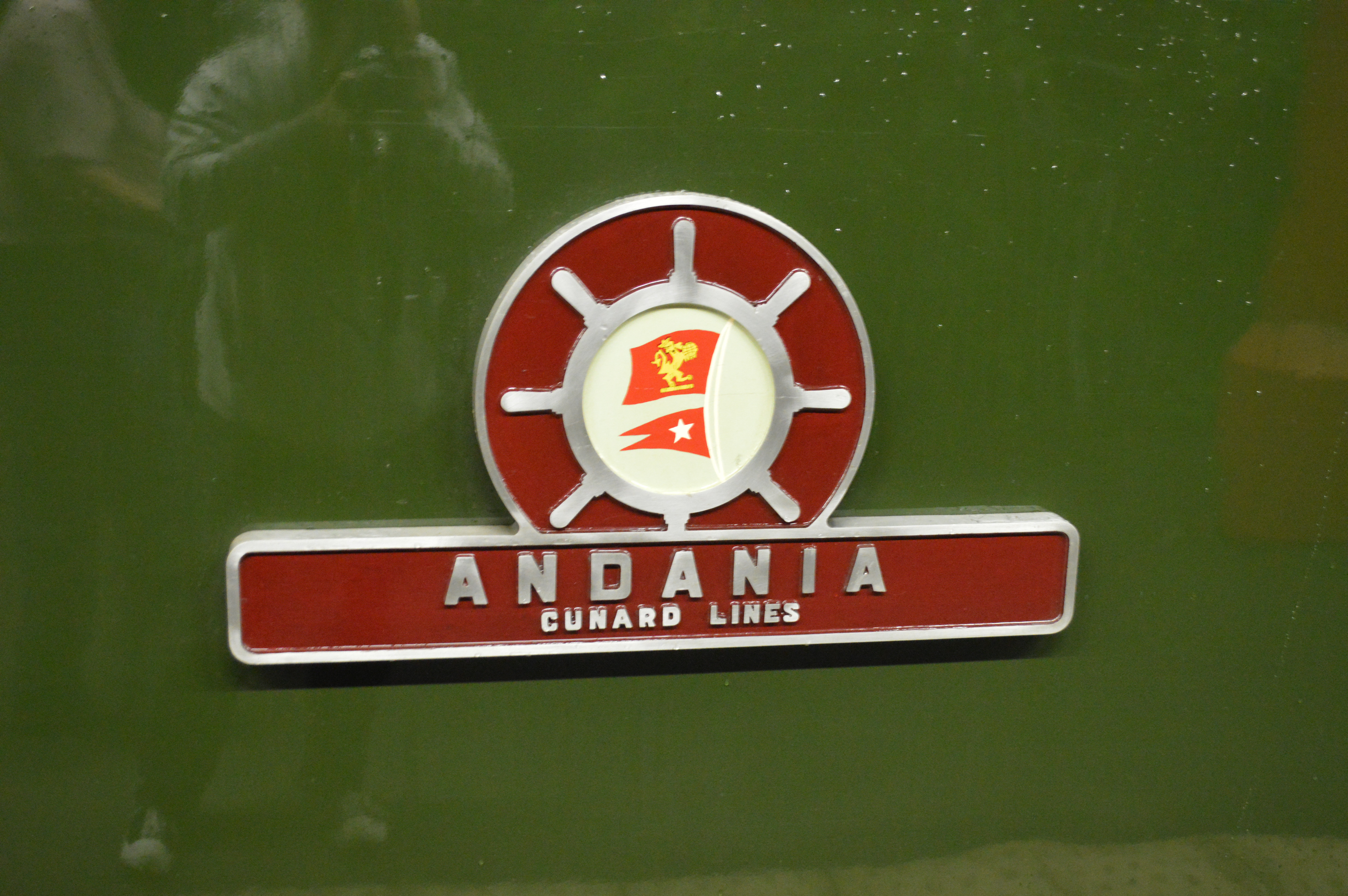
D213's Andania nameplate, preservation-era image

Locomotives in the range D210–D235 were to be named after ships operated by the companies Cunard Line, Elder Dempster Lines and Canadian Pacific Steamships, as they hauled express trains to Liverpool, the home port of these companies. The only locomotive not to carry a name was D226, which was to carry the name Media but never did so. From approximately 1970, with Class 40s no longer working these trains, the nameplates were gradually removed, so that by 1973 contributors to Railway World were reporting seven different locomotives running without nameplates, all observed in North Wales. However, the Ian Allan Motive Power Combined Volume (a list of all operational locomotives published annually for enthusiasts) was still listing the names of all officially named Class 40 locomotives in 1980, despite none having carried their nameplates for many years.

Names of Class 40 locomotives D210–D235
Loco	Name	Shipping line	Date named
D210	Empress of Britain	Canadian Pacific Steamships	May 1960
D211	Mauretania	Cunard Line	September 1960
D212	Aureol	Elder Dempster Lines	September 1960 (Note: Originally named at Liverpool Riverside on 20 September 1960.)
D213	Andania	Cunard Line	June 1962
D214	Antonia	Cunard Line	May 1961
D215	Aquitania	Cunard Line	May 1962
D216	Campania	Cunard Line	May 1962
D217	Carinthia	Cunard Line	May 1962
D218	Carmania	Cunard Line	July 1961
D219	Caronia	Cunard Line	June 1962
D220	Franconia	Cunard Line	February 1963
D221	Ivernia	Cunard Line	March 1961
D222	Laconia	Cunard Line	October 1962
D223	Lancastria	Cunard Line	May 1961
D224	Lucania	Cunard Line	August 1962
D225	Lusitania	Cunard Line	March 1962
D226	Media	Cunard Line	Never
D227	Parthia	Cunard Line	June 1962
D228	Samaria	Cunard Line	September 1962
D229	Saxonia	Cunard Line	March 1963
D230	Scythia	Cunard Line	April 1961
D231	Sylvania	Cunard Line	May 1962
D232	Empress of Canada	Canadian Pacific Steamships	March 1961
D233	Empress of England	Canadian Pacific Steamships	September 1961
D234	Accra	Elder Dempster Lines	May 1962
D235	Apapa	Elder Dempster Lines	May 1962

== British Rail service ==
Distribution of locomotives, March 1974
British Rail Class 40 is located in England
Code	Name	Quantity
GD	Gateshead	8
HA	Haymarket	19
HM	Healey Mills	32
KM	Kingmoor	26
LO	Longsight Diesel	53
SP	Springs Branch	40
YK	York	21
Withdrawn (1967)		1
Total built:		200

The Class 40s operated in all areas of British Rail, although sightings in the Western and Southern Regions were exceptionally rare and usually the result of special trains and/or unusual operational circumstances. Examples have been recorded, such as D317 hauling a parcels train between Micheldever and Basingstoke on 3 July 1967, and D335 operating the 07:35 Oxford to Paddington and 10:16 Paddington to Birmingham on 29 June 1971.

A review of the areas of operation published towards the end of the class's running life showed no regular operational service on the Southern Region; the only parts of the Western Region regularly visited were the Cambrian Line, between Shrewsbury and Aberystwyth, with freights on the Gloucester to Severn Tunnel Junction route.

After the early trials, the majority of Class 40s were based at depots in northern England; notably Longsight, Carlisle Kingmoor and Wigan Springs Branch on the Midland Region; Thornaby and Gateshead were depots in the Eastern Region.

The heyday of the class was in the early 1960s, when they hauled top-link expresses on the West Coast Main Line and in East Anglia.

Like many diesel locomotive types of the time, they suffered criticism for reliability. The train heating boilers were a particular early problem on the Class 40s, requiring strict maintenance and were fairly complicated to operate. Late Autumn 1958 on the Great Northern line saw that, on six out of ten days, the Flying Scotsman service failed to produce a diesel and ran late with a steam locomotive deputising. Breakdowns were common; the biggest problem the class encountered was their poor power-to-weight ratio and they lacked the versatility of the Class 37s, being either too heavy or too underpowered for the work allocated.

However, the arrival of more powerful diesels such as the Class 47, Class 50, Class 55 and the later InterCity 125, together with the electrification of the West Coast Main Line, meant that the fleet was gradually relegated to more mundane duties.

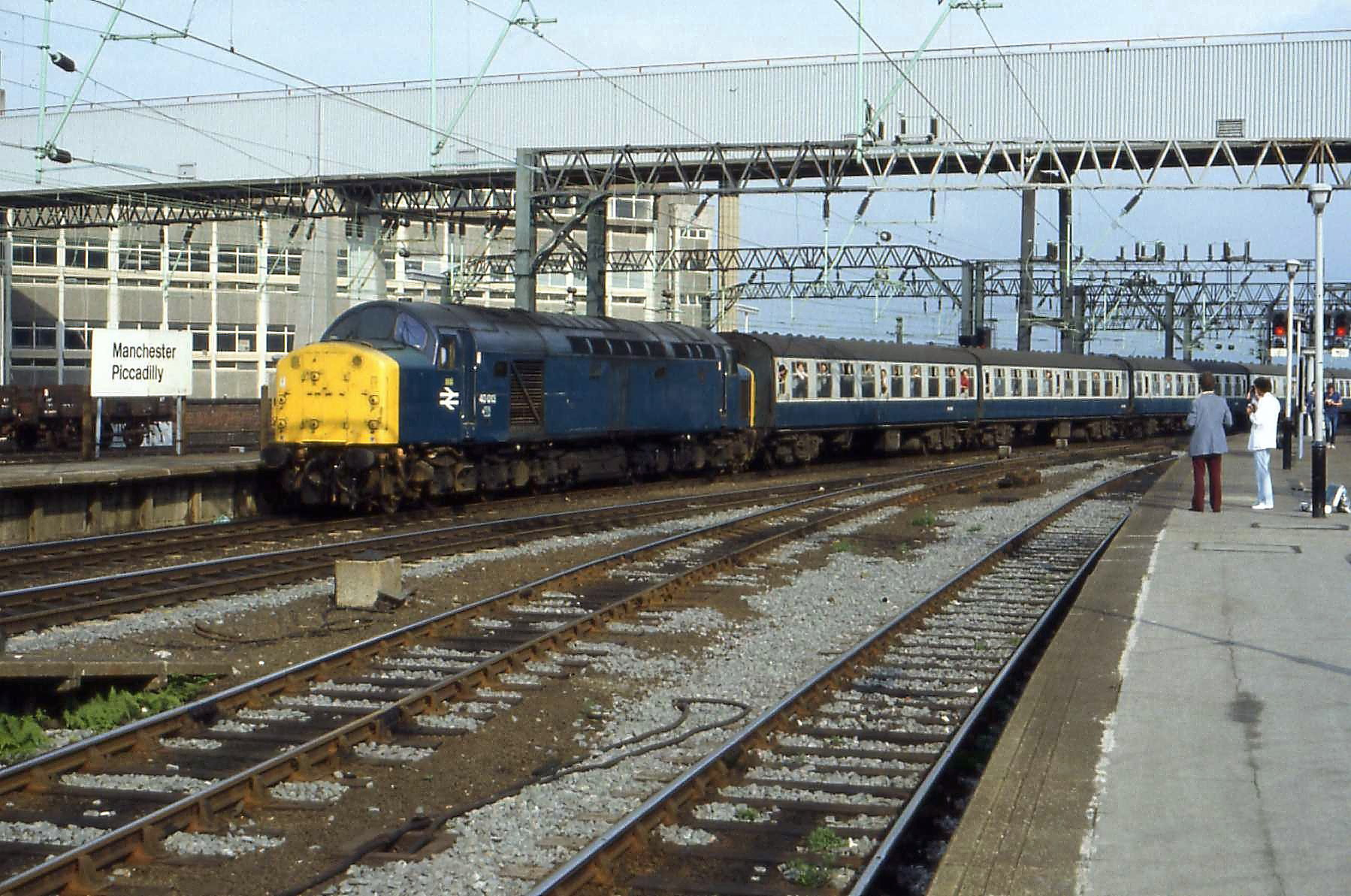
40013 (without nameplates) at Manchester Piccadilly in 1983

In later life, the locomotives were to be found hauling mainly heavy freight and passenger trains in the north of England and Scotland. As more new rolling stock was introduced, their passenger work decreased, partly due to their lack of electric train heating (D255 was fitted with electric train heating for a trial period in the mid-1960s) for newer passenger coaches. They lost their last front-line passenger duties – in Scotland – in 1980, and the last regular use on passenger trains was on the North Wales Coast Line between Holyhead, Crewe and Manchester, along with regular forays across the Pennines on Liverpool to York and Newcastle services.

Throughout the early 1980s, Class 40s were common performers on relief, day excursion and holidaymaker services along with deputisation duties for electric traction, especially on Sundays between Manchester and Birmingham. This resulted in visits to many distant parts of the network. It would be fair to say that few routes in the London Midland and Eastern regions did not see a Class 40 worked passenger service from time to time. Regular destinations included the seaside resorts of Scarborough, Skegness and Cleethorpes on the Eastern region, with Blackpool North and Stranraer being regularly visited on the West Coast.

Much rarer workings include visits to London's Paddington and Euston stations, Norwich, Cardiff Central and even Kyle of Lochalsh. The fact that 40s could turn up almost anywhere resulted in them being followed by a hard core of rail enthusiasts dedicated to journeying over lines with rare traction for the route.

=== Withdrawal ===
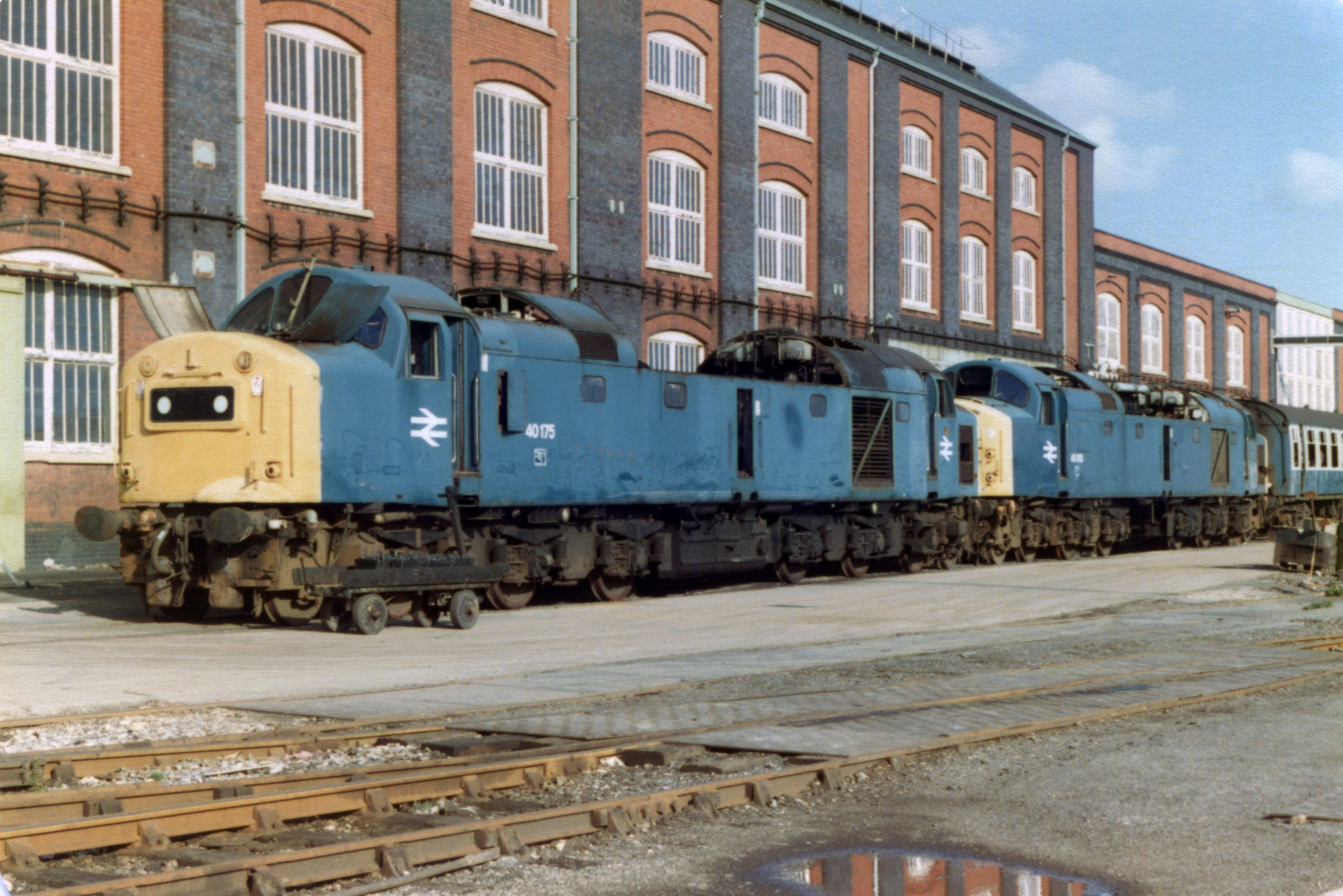
40175 and 40010 at Swindon in 1982; both had been withdrawn the previous year

Withdrawal of the Class 40s started in 1976, when three locomotives (40005, 40039 and 40102) were taken out of service. At over 130 tons, the class was, by then, considered underpowered. In addition, some were found to be suffering from fractures of the plate-frame bogies, due mainly to inappropriate use on wagon-load freight and the associated running into tightly curved yards; spares were also needed to keep other locomotives running.

Also, many Class 40s were not fitted with air braking, leaving them unable to haul more modern freight and passenger vehicles. Despite this, only seventeen had been withdrawn by the start of the 1980s. The locomotives became more popular with railway enthusiasts as their numbers started to dwindle.

Withdrawals then picked up apace, with the locomotives which lacked air brakes taking the brunt of the decline. In 1981, all 130 remaining locomotives were concentrated in the London Midland region of BR. Classified works overhauls on the Class 40s were also gradually phased out; only 29 members of the class had a full classified in 1980 and the final two emerged from Crewe Works in 1981. The last to receive a classified overhaul was 40167 in February 1981.

After that, active numbers reduced slowly until, by the end of 1984, there were only sixteen still running. These included the pioneer locomotive, 40122, which, having been withdrawn in 1981, was reinstated in July 1983 and painted in the original green livery to haul rail enthusiasts' specials. The last passenger run by a Class 40, apart from 40122, occurred on 27 January 1985, when 40012 hauled a train from Birmingham New Street to York. All of the remaining locomotives, except 40122, were withdrawn the next day.

The majority of Class 40s were cut up at Crewe, Doncaster and Swindon Works; the totals are listed below.

- Crewe Works scrapped 65 locomotives
- Doncaster Works scrapped 64
- Swindon Works scrapped 54.

The other ten locomotives to be scrapped were cut at Derby, Glasgow, Inverkeithing and Vic Berry's in Leicester.

The highest number of Class 40 withdrawals occurred in 1981 and 1983, with 41 locomotives withdrawn.

The very last Class 40s to be cut up were 40091 and 40195 by A. Hampton contractors, at Crewe Works in December 1988.

Table of withdrawals by year
Year	No. in service on 1 Jan	No. withdrawn	Locomotive numbers	Notes
1967	200	1	D322	Accident damage
1976	199	11	40005/21/39/41/43/45/53/89/102/189/190	40039 never received BR blue livery.
1977	188	4	40048/54/59/72	
1978	184	1	40051	Vacuum brake only
1979	183	0	–	
1980	183	20	40011/26/38/40/42/71/100/105/108-110/112/114/119/123/142/146/147/156/161	
1981	163	41	40 010/14/16-19/23/31/32/37 /62/65-67/70/75/78/83/95/98 /107/111/113/116/117/120/122/125/134/137/144/149 /151/165/171/173/175/176/178/179/193	40122 would be reinstated 24 April 1983. 40010 withdrawn only 14 months after receiving a full classified works overhaul.
1982	122	32	40003/08/20/25/36/55/64/87/88/92/94/101/103/115/127/128/130/132/136/138-140/148 /154/162-163/166/182/184/186/187/199	40183 was due for an E exam; the locomotive was withdrawn but then reinstated and given E exam 8 September 1982. Final withdrawal came on 30 May 1983, with bogie fractures.
1983	90	41	40 006/07/27/30/46/49 /50/52/61/68/69/73/76/77/80/81/84/90/93/96/97 /106/121/131/141/145 /153/157-159/164/169/170/172/180 /183/185/188/191/197/198	40185 withdrawn, two years overdue a classified works repair. 40076 provided bogies for the restoration of 40122.
1984	49	33	40 001/02/04/09/15/22/24/28/29/33-35/47 /56-58/63/74/82/85/91/99 /124/126/129/133 /160/167/168/174/177/195/196	40009, the last vacuum braked Class 40, was withdrawn on 7 November 1984 with bearings and traction motor problems. 40126 was the locomotive stopped at Sears Crossing in the 1963 Great Train Robbery.
1985	16	16	40012/13/44/60/79/86/104/118/135/143 /150/152/155/181/192/194	All locos were switched off surplus to requirements or life-expired by 22 January 1985.

=== Further use ===
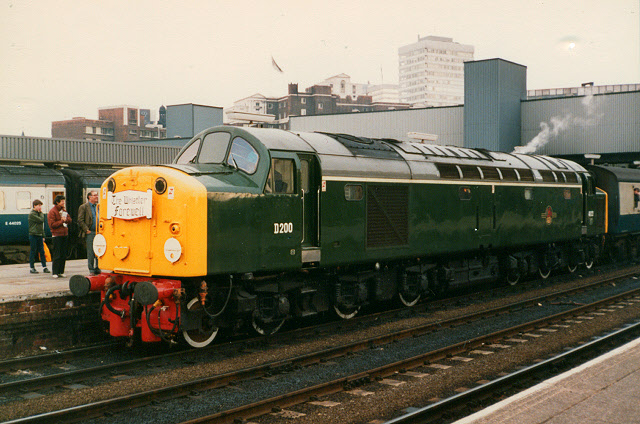
40122, numbered D200, with a farewell railtour (1985)

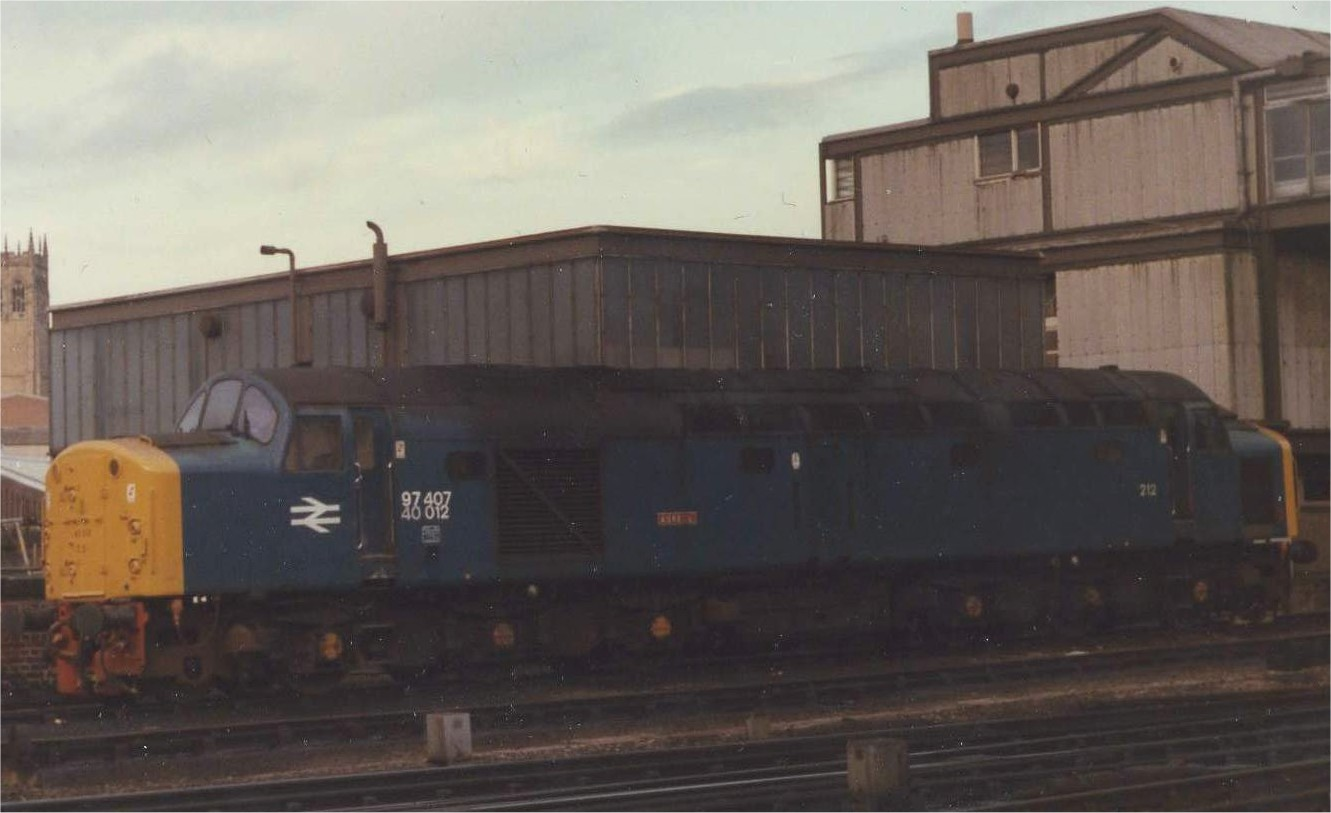
Departmental Class 40 no. 97407 at Manchester Victoria in 1986. Note that the locomotive carries both its former numbers of 40012 and (D)212

The Class 40 story was not quite over, however. Upon the joint initiative of enthusiasts Howard Johnston and Murray Brown who noticed 40122, on the withdrawn sidings at Carlisle Kingmoor depot in summer 1981, ready to go to Swindon Works for breaking up. 40122 was reinstated by BR, with a replacement bogie and power unit from 40076, after an overhaul at Toton TMD. Now in working condition and repainted in BR green, it was used regularly to haul normal passenger trains in the hope of attracting enthusiasts, as well as special trains. In addition, four locomotives were temporarily returned to service as Class 97 departmental locomotives, numbered 97405–408. They were used to work engineering trains for a remodelling project at Crewe station; these were withdrawn by March 1987.

40122 was eventually withdrawn in 1988 and presented to the National Railway Museum in York. Six other locomotives were preserved and, on 30 November 2002, over sixteen years after the last Class 40 had hauled a main line passenger train, the Class 40 Preservation Society's 40145 hauled an enthusiasts' railtour, "The Christmas Cracker IV", from Crewe to Holyhead via Birmingham. Following a three-year hiatus, after suffering a traction motor flashover, 40145 returned to main line operation in 2014.

== Accidents and incidents ==
- On 2 December 1960, at a farm level crossing between East Linton and Dunbar, a car ran into the side of a steam locomotive hauling a passing freight train. Seconds later, the car was struck by another freight train hauled by D249 from the opposite direction. Four of the five occupants of the car were killed; the car driver survived with serious injuries.
- On 3 June 1962, D244, just 30 months old, was at the head of the 22:15 London Kings Cross to Edinburgh Waverley from the previous night. The train was diverted from Peterborough via Sleaford, with a route conductor taking charge. Approaching Lincoln at 00:45 hours on the Sunday morning, too fast for a 15 mph permanent speed restriction, the locomotive lurched but stayed on the track, though its train of sleeping cars were all derailed. The rear portion of the train narrowly missed demolishing Pelham Street signal box. Three people were killed in the incident, including the sleeping car attendant, whilst 30 others were injured.
- On 26 December 1962, D215 Aquitania was hauling the up Mid-Day Scot when it collided with the rear of a Liverpool-Birmingham train, at Coppenhall Junction, Crewe. 18 were killed and 34 injured, including the guard. Contrary to popular belief, D326 was not hauling the train.
- On 7 May 1965, a freight train was derailed at Preston-le-Skerne, County Durham. D350 was hauling a newspaper train that ran into the derailed wagons and was itself derailed. Recovery of the locomotive was not until 16 May.
- On 13 May 1966, a freight train became divided between Norton Junction and Weaver Junction, in Cheshire. D322, hauling an express passenger train, was in collision with the rear part of the freight train, which had run away. Both the driver and secondman were killed. The locomotive was withdrawn in September 1967.
- On 14 August 1966, D311 was hauling a passenger train, which was derailed when it ran into a landslip at Sanquhar, Dumfriesshire.
- On 31 July 1967, D283 was hauling a loaded Cliffe to Uddingston cement train at Thirsk, in North Yorkshire. The train derailed with one wagon coming to rest around 2 feet foul of the adjacent down fast line. Moments later, experimental locomotive DP2, hauling a Scotland-bound express, collided with the wagon at around 50 mph. Seven people were killed and 45 injured; DP2 and the leading three coaches were destroyed.
- On 6 August 1975, 40189 was hauling a freight train which was unable to stop due to a lack of brake power. It collided with another freight train at Weaver Junction, in Cheshire.
- On 26 October 1975, an express passenger train failed at Lunan, Angus. 40111 was sent to its assistance but ran into the rear of the failed train at 25 miles per hour (40 km/h). One person was killed and eleven were injured.
- On 24 December 1977, 40164 was in collision with coaches (due to form the 06:00 service to Mallaig) at platform 5 of Glasgow Queen Street. The driver had lost control of the locomotive on the 1 in 45 descending gradient in Queen Street Tunnel. The cause of the accident was identified at the subsequent inquiry to packing pieces not having been inserted into the brake system, after the locomotive's wheels had been profiled on the wheel lathe, reducing their diameter.
- In September 1978, 40044 was hauling a freight train that ran away and was derailed by trap points at Chinley, in Derbyshire.

=== D326: The Great Train Robbery of 1963 ===
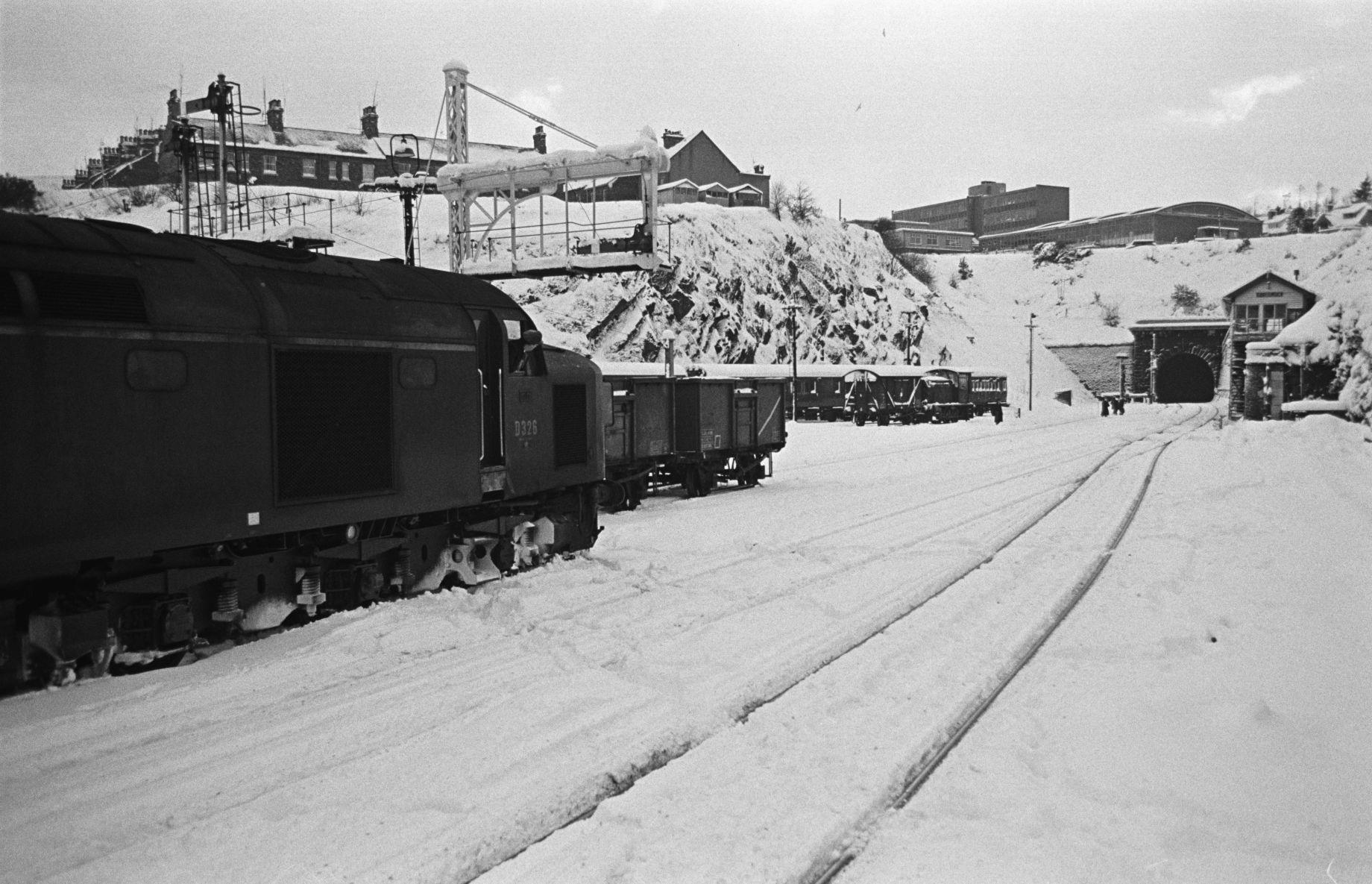
D326 at Bangor, North Wales in 1967

D326 (later 40126) was the most infamous member of the class. The engine had an early chequered history: it was classed as a jinxed loco by some railwaymen, with some drivers being reluctant to drive it. In 1963, it was involved in the Great Train Robbery and, a year later in August 1964, a secondman was electrocuted when washing the windows. Finally, in August 1965, it suffered total brake failure with a maintenance train at Birmingham New Street and hit the rear of a freight train, injuring the guard. It was scrapped in 1984.

40126 was withdrawn from service on 15 February 1984, when it was offered to the National Railway Museum, in York, as an exhibit. However, the NRM declined and it was scrapped at Doncaster Works with indecent haste, no doubt to stop any pillaging souvenir hunters. Other famous 40s include 40106, which was the last to remain in BR green livery, and 40009, the last with vacuum brakes only.

== In popular culture ==
D318 (since preserved) appeared in the film Robbery, a fictionalised version of the Great Train Robbery.

== Preservation ==
Seven complete locomotives have been preserved. plus one cab from 40088.

Of the seven, all except for 40118 have run in preservation and two have run on the main line in preservation: D213 (40013) and D345 (40145).

One locomotive, 40013 Andania, was rescued from Vic Berry's scrapyard in 1987.

Number (Current no. in bold)			Name	Builder	Built	Withdrawn	Service life	Current Livery	Current status	Current location	Image	Notes
**D200**	40 122			Vulcan Foundry	March 1958	April 1988	30 years, 1 month	BR Green	Static Exhibit	National Railway Museum		Headcode discs. Part of the National Collection.
D212	**40 012**	97 407	Aureol	Vulcan Foundry	May 1959	April 1986	26 years, 11 months	BR Blue	Operational	Midland Railway - Butterley		Headcode discs.
**D213**	40 013		Andania	Vulcan Foundry	June 1959	October 1984	25 years, 4 months	BR Green	Operational and main line registered	Crewe Diesel TMD		Headcode discs. Part of Locomotive Services Limited's diesel fleet.
D288	**40 088**			Vulcan Foundry	August 1960	February 1982	21 years, 6 months	BR Blue	Cab Used As Static Exhibit	Llanelli & Mynydd Mawr Railway		Headcode discs. One cab preserved, mounted on a road trailer. Owned by the Cab Yard, formerly owned by the Class 40 Preservation Society.
D306	**40 106**		Atlantic Conveyor	Robert Stephenson and Hawthorns	October 1960	April 1983	22 years, 6 months	BR Green	Operational	East Lancashire Railway		Headcode discs. Owned by the Class 40 Preservation Society. Named in preservation.
D318	40 118	**97 408**		Robert Stephenson and Hawthorns	February 1961	February 1986	25 years	BR Blue	Under overhaul	Battlefield Line Railway		Headcode discs.
D335	**40 135**	97 406		Vulcan Foundry	March 1961	December 1986	25 years, 9 months	BR Blue	Under overhaul	East Lancashire Railway		Split headcode boxes. Owned by the Class 40 Preservation Society.
**D345**	40 145		*East Lancashire Railway	Vulcan Foundry	May 1961	June 1983	22 Years, 1 Month	BR Green	Operational and main line registered	East Lancashire Railway		Headcode blinds. Owned by the Class 40 Preservation Society, on hire to West Coast Railways. Named during the East Lancashire Railway's 20th anniversary; however, currently not carrying nameplates.

== Model railways ==
There have been many models of Class 40s over the years in OO gauge:

- Jouef entered the UK OO gauge market with a model, in around 1977. This was available in blue or green, but only the disc headcode version was available; it was not a very accurate model, being overly wide.
- Lima produced an improved version of the class from 1988 and was available with all four nose styles. (Note: These were the disc headcode, the split box headcode, as well as the round-cornered and square-cornered central box headcode versions.)
- Bachmann produced a highly-detailed Class 40 in 2004, but this was criticised somewhat for poor shape in the cab window area. This was addressed by Bachmann later in production, when lighting was included and the drive was a true 1CO-CO1 arrangement.
- Hornby Railways launched its first version of the Class 40 in 2010, which was a remotored Lima model that Hornby had acquired; it is basic representation of the prototype as part of their Railroad range in BR Blue in OO gauge.
- Bachmann released a new tooled Class 40 in 2023, including D213 Andania, which is presented in her current main line operating condition; BR Green livery with small yellow panels.
- Heljan A/S produced an O gauge model of the disc headcode Class 40 around 2012 and followed this up with the centre headcode version in 2021.

British N gauge models of the Class 40 have been produced by Graham Farish, representing the main three headcode versions. A BR Green version of D211 Mauretania received a positive review from The Railway Magazine's Guide to Modelling in 2017.
