= RMS Ausonia =

British ocean liners

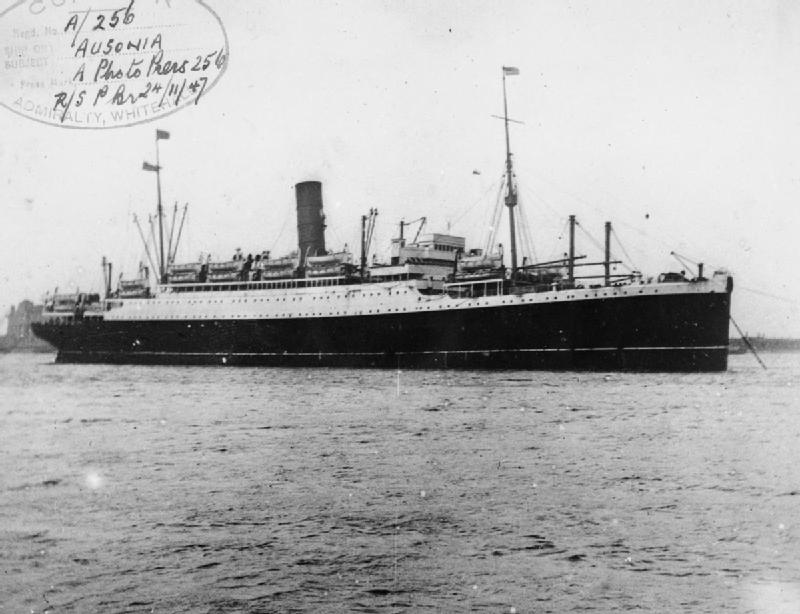
- Ausonia anchored at Liverpool, November 1947

History

United Kingdom
- Name: RMS Ausonia
- Owner: Cunard Line
- Builder: Armstrong Whitworth, Newcastle upon Tyne
- Yard number: 970
- Launched: 22 March 1921
- Maiden voyage: 31 August 1922
- Fate: Scrapped, 1965

General characteristics
- Tonnage: 13,912 gross register tons (GRT)
- Length: 538 ft (164 m)
- Beam: 65 ft 4 in (19.91 m)
- Propulsion: Geared turbines, 8,500 shp (6,338 kW), twin screws
- Speed: 15 knots (28 km/h; 17 mph)
- Capacity: 510 cabin class, 1,178 third class
- Crew: 270

RMS Ausonia, launched in 1921, was one of Cunard's six post-World War I "A-class" ocean liners for the Canadian service.

== History ==
Ausonia was built in Newcastle by Armstrong, Whitworth & Co., launched on 22 March 1921, and completed in June. She made her maiden voyage on 31 August 1921 from Liverpool to Montreal, and the following season went into service on the London-Canada route.

In December 1938, the Ausonia carried about 50 American veterans of the Abraham Lincoln Brigade returning from the Spanish Civil War from Le Havre, France, by way of England and Halifax, Nova Scotia, arriving in New York City on 20 December 1938.

On 29 April 1939, English composer Benjamin Britten and tenor Peter Pears sailed from Southampton for Canada on Ausonia to begin what became a three-year sojourn in North America. Britten described the voyage as at first "bloody boring", though there was later a "terrific gale" and even "ice bumping against the ship". Towards the end of the voyage, they gave a recital for voice and piano.

On 2 September 1939, with British involvement in the Second World War imminent, Ausonia was hurriedly docked at Quebec and repainted grey. With the outbreak of war, Ausonia was requisitioned by the Admiralty and converted into an armed merchant cruiser, commissioning on 7 November that year with a pennant number of F53. Armament consisted of eight 6-inch (152 mm) guns, with two 3-inch (76 mm) anti-aircraft guns fitted. She operated in the Atlantic, with her first commanding officer being Mark Pizey, later to become an Admiral. In 1942, Ausonia was purchased by the Admiralty and in May 1942 converted to a heavy repair ship. Her previous armament was removed, and a close-in armament of twenty Oerlikon 20 mm cannon fitted in its place. She served in the Far East for the rest of the war.

After return from the Far East, she was laid up in reserve at Chatham. On 16 September 1958 recommissioned at Devonport and was then sent to Malta as repair ship for the Mediterranean Fleet, replacing Ranpura. She gradually assumed more duties, becoming a depot ship for submarines and minesweepers based at Malta in 1962. She finally left Malta on 7 August 1964, returning to Portsmouth on 18 August where she was laid up. In September 1965, having been sold for scrap, she left Portsmouth to be broken up at Castellón de la Plana, Spain.

== See also ==
- SS Albania
- RMS Antonia
- RMS Andania
- RMS Ascania
- RMS Aurania
