= HMS Artifex =

Cruiser of the Royal Navy

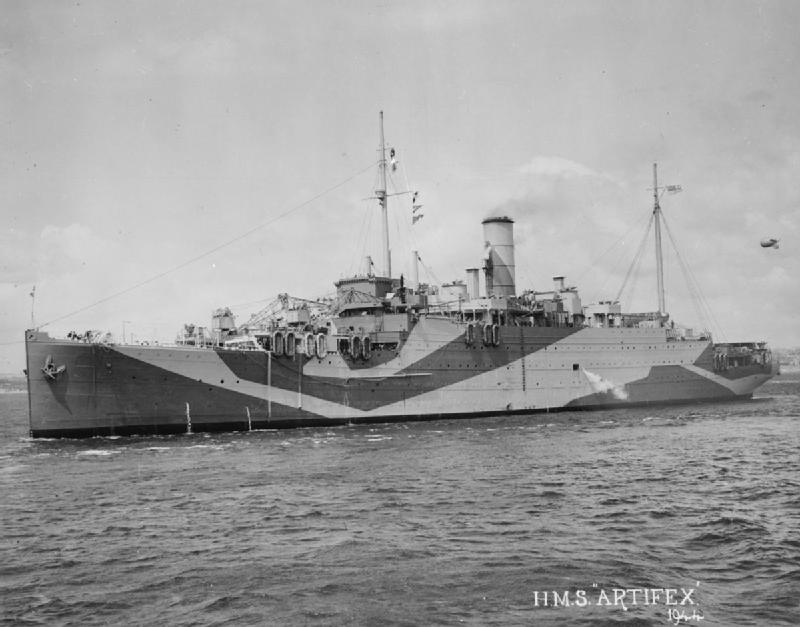
- as HMS Artifex

History

United Kingdom
- Name: RMS Aurania
- Operator: Cunard (1924-1933); Cunard White Star Ltd (1933-1939)
- Builder: Swan Hunter and Wigham Richardson Ltd., Wallsend-on-Tyne
- Launched: 6 February 1924
- Out of service: Requisitioned on 30 August 1939; Purchased on 24 March 1942

United Kingdom
- Name: HMS Artifex
- Acquired: Requisitioned on 30 August 1939; Purchased outright on 24 March 1942
- Commissioned: August 1944
- Renamed: Renamed HMS Artifex in November 1942
- Reclassified: Armed Merchant Cruiser on 2 October 1939; Repair ship in 1944
- Identification: Pennant number F28
- Fate: Scrapped in 1961

General characteristics
- Tonnage: 13,984 GRT
- Length: 520 ft (160 m)
- Beam: 65 ft (20 m)
- Propulsion: Steam turbines
- Speed: 15 knots (28 km/h; 17 mph)
- Armament: (As AMC) 8 × 6 inch (152 mm) guns; 2 × 3 inch (76 mm) guns

HMS Artifex was a repair ship of the Royal Navy from late in the Second World War and into the Cold War. Launched as the Cunard liner RMS Aurania she was requisitioned on the outbreak of war to serve as an armed merchant cruiser. Damaged by a U-boat while sailing with an Atlantic convoy, she was purchased outright and converted to a floating workshop, spending the rest of her life as a support ship for the navy.

== Peacetime career ==
As one of the post-Great War "A-class" ocean liners, RMS Aurania was built by Swan Hunter and Wigham Richardson Ltd. at their Wallsend-on-Tyne yard for Cunard and launched on 6 February 1924. Her sisters included RMS Alaunia and RMS Ausonia. With the merger of Cunard and the White Star Line in 1933, she continued to serve with the resulting company, Cunard White Star Ltd.

== War career ==
With war looming, she was requisitioned by the Admiralty on 30 August 1939 and converted to serve as an armed merchant cruiser, which involved the fitting of a number of guns. The conversion was completed on 2 October 1939. On completion of the work she entered service protecting trade sailing through the North Atlantic, covering the convoys. She was initially assigned to the Northern Patrol, followed by the Bermuda and Halifax Escort Force and then the North Atlantic Escort Force.

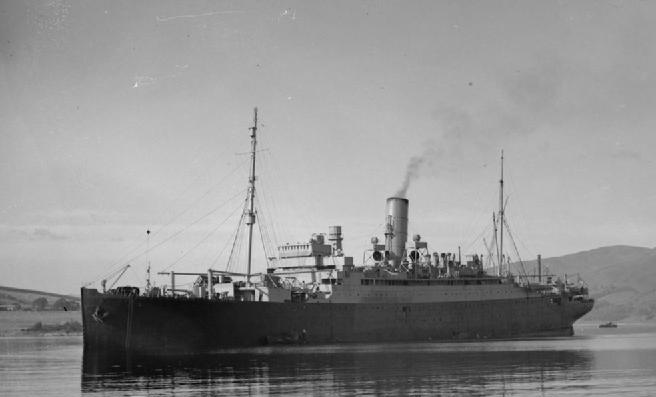
Aurania lying in Rothesay Bay on 24 October 1941, after having been damaged in the Atlantic

On 21 October 1941 she was sailing as an escort for convoy SL 89, bound from Halifax to the Clyde. She was straggling behind the convoy with a group of four other armed merchant cruisers and was sighted by U-123, under the command of Reinhard Hardegen. At 04.28 hours he fired three torpedoes at her, two of them hitting the Aurania in the bow and under the bridge. The ship began to flood at the Number 3 hold, causing a list to port that eventually reached 25 degrees. The Aurania's cargo of empty drums acted to keep her afloat, and the captain was able to reduce the list to 15 degrees and get underway again. Meanwhile, other convoy escorts had chased U-123 away from the scene. During the confusion a lifeboat had been launched containing six men, but it swamped upon hitting the water. One of the escorts, the Hunt class destroyer HMS Croome, picked up three of the men, but was unable to locate the others. Some hours later U-123 came across the sinking lifeboat, with a single survivor, and took him prisoner. Meanwhile, Aurania was escorted back to Rothesay Bay by the sloop HMS Totland, arriving on 23 October. The Germans claimed that she had been sunk.

She was laid up, spending the period between November 1941 and March 1942 with Plymouth Command. She was bought outright by the Admiralty on 24 March 1942 and selected for conversion to a Heavy Repair Ship. Work began that December and lasted until July 1944. She was commissioned in August as HMS Artifex and after carrying out trials was prepared for service in the Pacific theatre. She sailed to join the British Pacific Fleet in early 1945, and by March was being deployed out of Manus in the Admiralty Islands, supporting the ships of Task Force 57. Artifex took passage to Leyte on 19 April to support ships involved in the attacks against the airfields in the Sakishima-Gunto Islands. She remained here throughout April and much of May, sailing for Manus again on 20 May. She remained here for the rest of the war. On being released from the British Pacific Fleet in September she sailed back to Britain.

== Post-war ==
Artifex was kept in commission after her return and was assigned to the training establishment HMS Caledonia at Rosyth, which was used to train artificer apprentices. She remained here as a training ship until 1955, when she was paid off and reduced to the reserve. She continued to be based at Caledonia though as a tender. She was finally laid up at the Dockyard and placed on the disposal list. HMS Artifex was sold for scrapping to BISCO on 28 December 1960 and departed Rosyth under tow on 7 January 1961, bound for the shipbreakers at Spezia.
