= LNER Thompson Class B1 61306 =

Preserved British 4-6-0 locomotive

LNER 61306 Mayflower
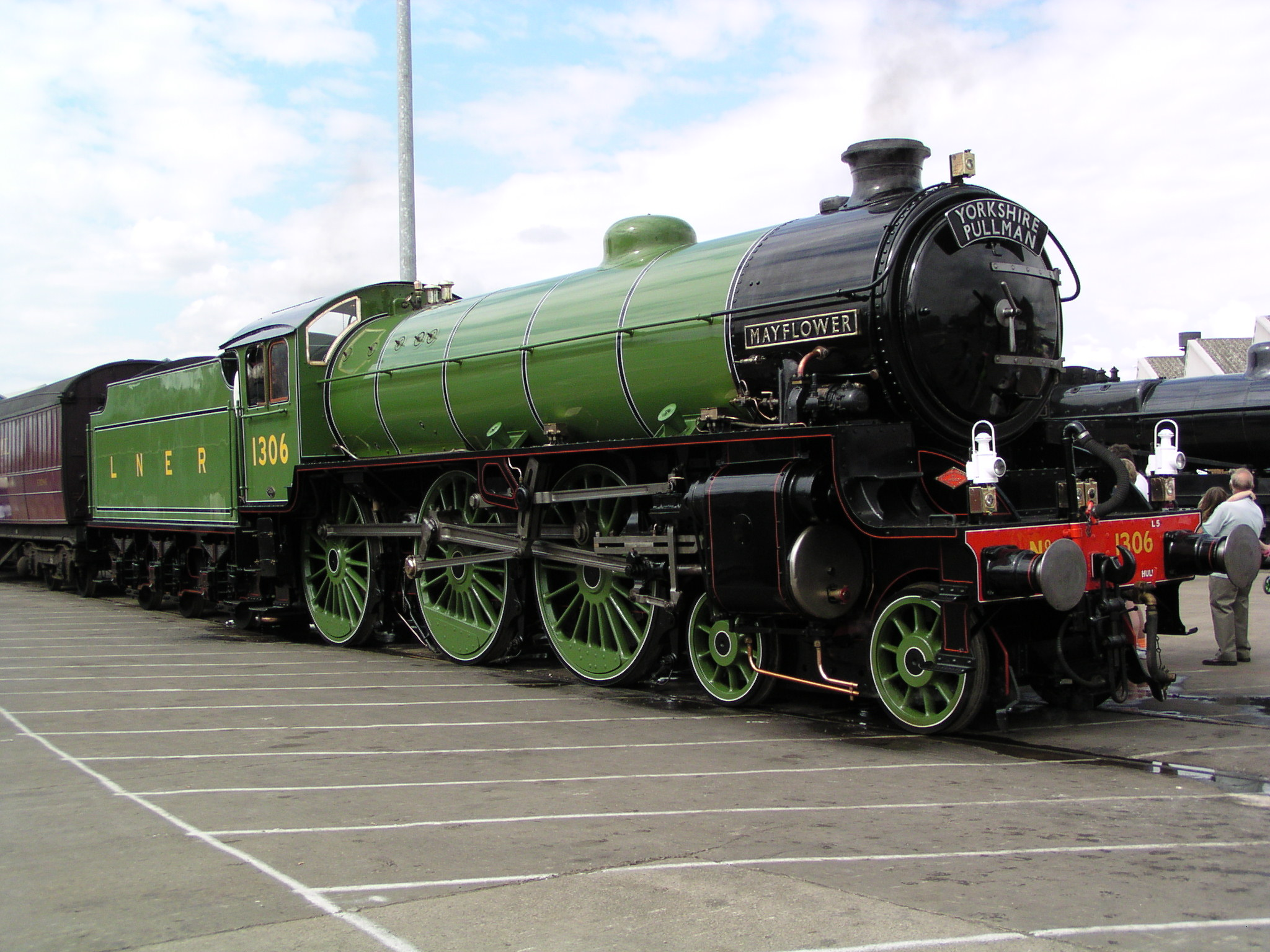
- Mayflower at Doncaster Works in 2003
Type and origin
- Power type: Steam
- Designer: Edward Thompson
- Builder: North British Locomotive Company, Glasgow
- Order number: L963
- Serial number: 26207
- Build date: April 1948
Specifications
- Configuration
  - Whyte: 4-6-0
  - UIC: 2′C h2
- Gauge: 4 ft 8 1/2 in (1,435 mm)
- Leading dia.: 3 ft 2 in (0.965 m)
- Driver dia.: 6 ft 2 in (1.880 m)
- Loco weight: 71 long tons 3 cwt (159,400 lb or 72.3 t)
- Fuel type: Coal
- Water cap.: 4,000 imp gal (18,000 L; 4,800 US gal)
- Boiler: LNER diagram 100A
- Boiler pressure: 225 psi (1.55 MPa)
- Cylinders: Two (outside)
- Cylinder size: 20 in × 26 in (508 mm × 660 mm)
- Valve gear: Walschaerts
- Valve type: 10-inch (254 mm) piston valves
Performance figures
- Tractive effort: 26,878 lbf (119.56 kN)
Career
- Operators: British Railways
- Power class: 5MT
- Axle load class: Route Availability 5
- Withdrawn: September 1967
- Current owner: Locomotive Services Group
- Disposition: Operational, mainline certified

LNER Thompson Class B1 No. 61306 Mayflower is a 4-6-0 steam locomotive built in 1948 at the North British Locomotive Company to a design by Edward Thompson. It was employed for hauling mixed traffic trains on British Railways' Eastern, North Eastern, and Scottish Regions until it was bought for preservation in 1967, during which it was renumbered and given its current name.

In 2019, Mayflower emerged from an extensive overhaul and is certified for running on the British mainline.

== Service ==
61306 was built in 1948 by the North British Locomotive Company, Works No. 26207. Though built to an LNER design, it was delivered after nationalisation to British Railways (BR).

61306 was initially allocated to Hull Botanic Gardens Depot (shed code 53B). In June 1959 it was transferred to nearby Hull Dairycoates Depot (53A). Its final allocation in June 1967 was to Bradford Low Moor depot (56F), but it was quickly withdrawn in September 1967.

== Preservation ==
61306 was privately purchased for preservation at Steamtown Carnforth, one of just two preserved Thompson B1s, the other being LNER-built No. (6)1264.

At Steamtown it was painted into LNER Apple Green Livery, given the number 1306 and the name Mayflower. 1306 would have been its allocated running number had the LNER not been nationalised (most ex-LNER BR numbers being the LNER 1946 numbers with the addition of 60000), while the name Mayflower came from a scrapped BR-built Thompson B1, numbered 61379.

In 1978, it moved to the Great Central Railway in Leicestershire, where it remained until 1989 when it was taken out of service for a ten-year overhaul. Scheduled to return to Hull Dairycoates, the sale of the site meant that it moved to the Nene Valley Railway.

Sold privately in 2006 to the Boden family, it moved to their company, Boden Rail Engineering Ltd, in Washwood Heath, Birmingham. In 2013, it returned to steam wearing its original BR Apple Green livery and 61306, operated by West Coast Railways from their base at the former Steamtown Carnforth.

In 2014, 61306 was sold by the Boden family to David Buck and moved to the North Norfolk Railway. It was prepared there for full mainline running, operating the Cathedrals Express from Norwich to Windsor, its first mainline operating since the mid-1970s.

In February 2019, for its first revenue earning run after emerging from an overhaul and testing at Carnforth, 61306 double headed with SR Merchant Navy no 35018 British India Line while hauling The Railway Touring Company's "Winter Cumbrian Mountain Express" that ran from London Euston to Carlisle on Sat 2 Feb. The two engines, with 61306 acting as pilot to 35018, took over the train from 86259 at Carnforth for the run to Carlisle via Shap. The return leg took the two engines south down the Settle and Carlisle, Ribble Valley & East Lancashire Lines to Preston, where 86259 took over again.

61306 Mayflower captured at a level crossing during a rail tour in 2026

During Summer 2019, it operated three regular, one-way, Tuesdays only services from Waterloo to Windsor and Eton Riverside, being the first regular steam-operated service from that London terminus for 52 years, alongside a steam excursion on the same day.

In June 2022, the engine was acquired from David Buck by Jeremy Hosking -owned "Locomotive Services Group". The engine alongside operating the Steam Dreams programme of railtours will also become part of the LSL pool of engines.
