= Merseyside Express =

Overview
- Service type: Passenger train
- Current operator: London Midland

Route
- Termini: Euston; Liverpool Lime Street
- Service frequency: Daily
- Line used: West Coast Main Line

Technical
- Rolling stock: Stanier 8P pacific, No.6201 Princess Elizabeth

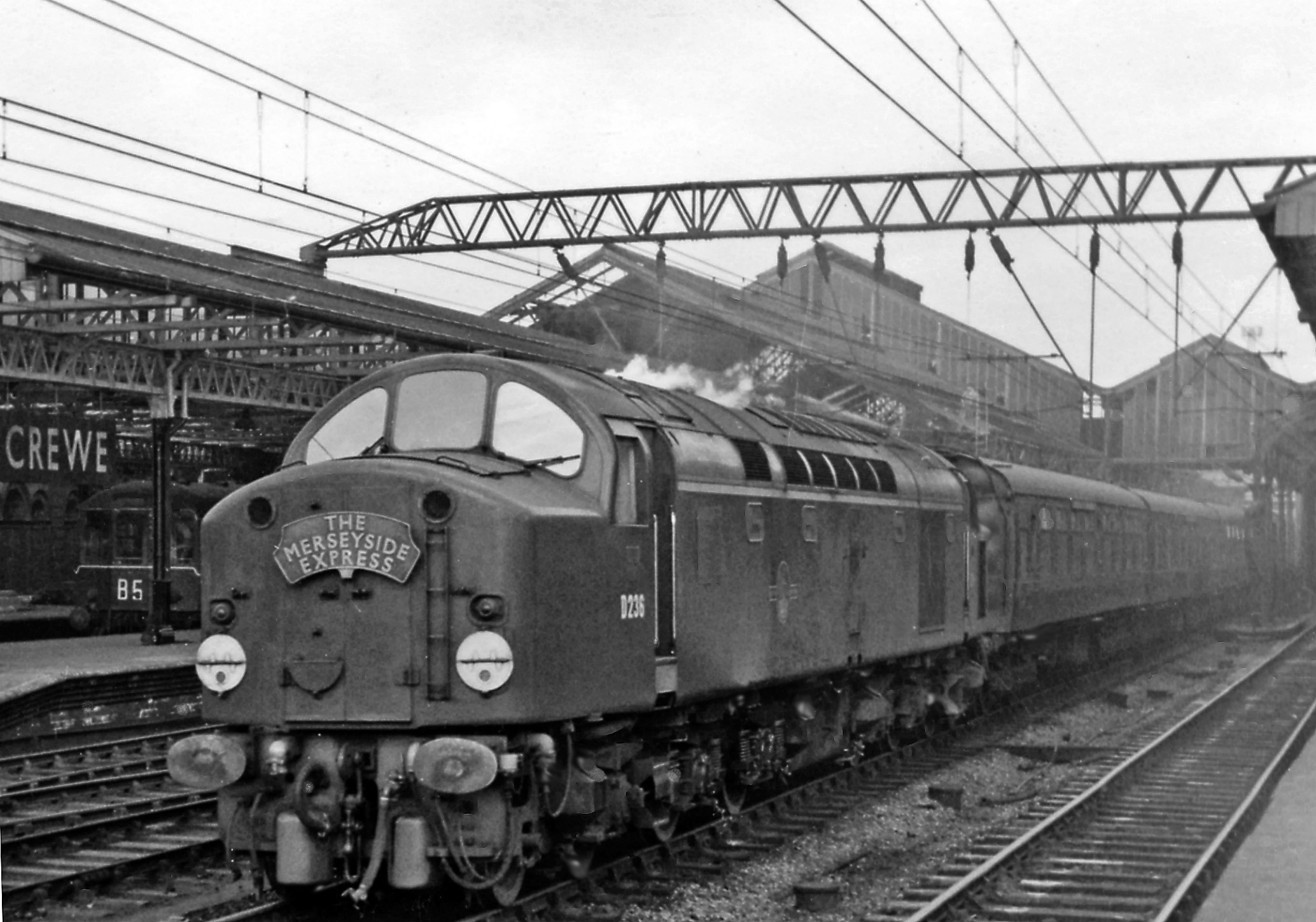
British Rail Class 40 No. D236 at Crewe on 14 April 1960

The Merseyside Express was a named passenger train that ran non-stop between Euston and Liverpool Lime Street stations on the West Coast Main Line in the 1950s, typically hauled by Princess class Pacifics. Its final journey was in 1962. Lizzie, named after the future queen when she was just seven years old, has held the world record for continuous high-speed travel by any steam locomotive since 1936.

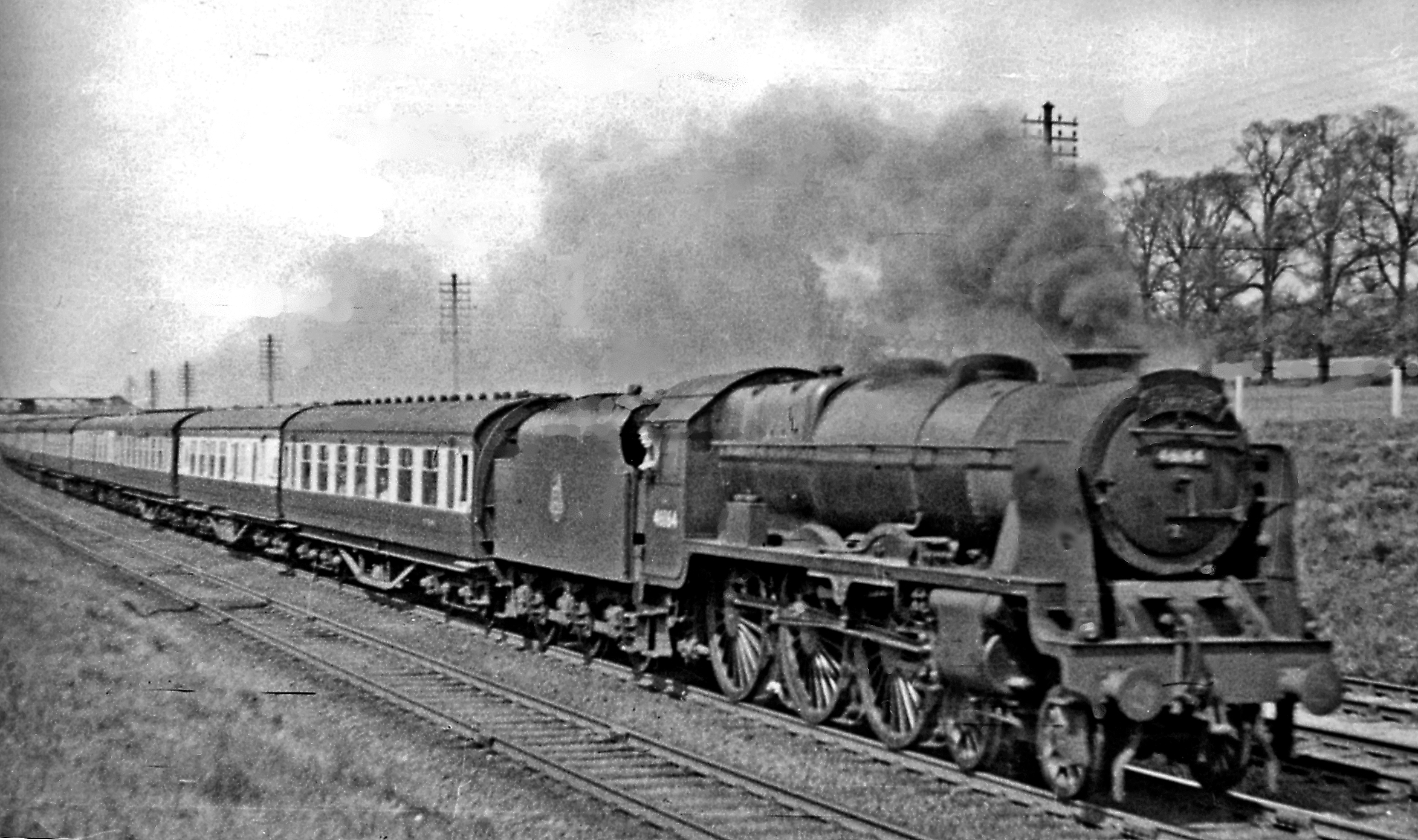
LMS Rebuilt Royal Scot Class 46164 The Artists' Rifleman with the Up Merseyside Express between Tring and Berkhamsted on 5 May 1962.

== See also ==
- Liverpool-Manchester lines
