= LNER Thompson Class B1 (6)1264 =

Preserved steam locomotive

LNER 61264
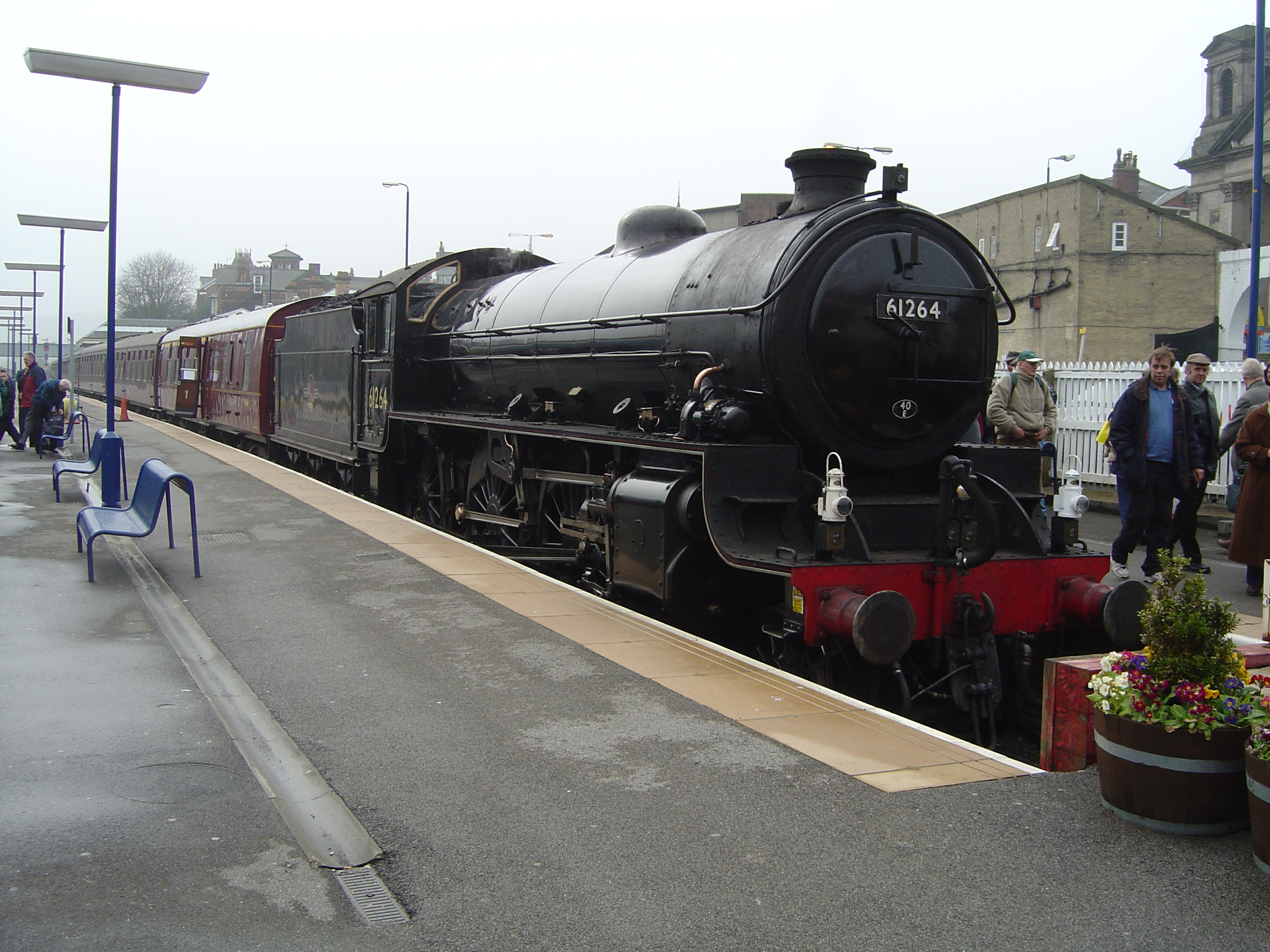
- 61264 in British Railways livery at Scarborough in 2004 after working the "Scarborough Spa Express.
Type and origin
- Power type: Steam
- Designer: Edward Thompson
- Builder: North British Locomotive Company, Glasgow
- Order number: L963
- Serial number: 26165
- Build date: December 1947
Specifications
- Configuration
  - Whyte: 4-6-0
  - UIC: 2′C h2
- Gauge: 4 ft 8 1/2 in (1,435 mm)
- Leading dia.: 3 ft 2 in (0.965 m)
- Driver dia.: 6 ft 2 in (1.880 m)
- Loco weight: 71 long tons 3 cwt (159,400 lb or 72.3 t)
- Fuel type: Coal
- Water cap.: 4,000 imp gal (18,000 L; 4,800 US gal)
- Boiler: LNER diagram 100A
- Boiler pressure: 225 psi (1.55 MPa)
- Cylinders: Two (outside)
- Cylinder size: 20 in × 26 in (508 mm × 660 mm)
- Valve gear: Walschaerts
- Valve type: 10-inch (254 mm) piston valves
Performance figures
- Tractive effort: 26,878 lbf (119.56 kN)
Career
- Operators: British Railways
- Power class: 5MT
- Axle load class: Route Availability 5
- Withdrawn: November 1965
- Current owner: Thompson B1 Locomotive Trust
- Disposition: Awaiting overhaul

London and North Eastern Railway (LNER) Thompson Class B1 No. 1264, (later British Railways No. 61264, and Departmental No. 29) is a preserved British steam locomotive.

== History ==
1264 was built in 1947 by the North British Locomotive Company, Works No. 26165.

=== Service ===
It was initially allocated to Parkeston Quay (shed code 30F), near Harwich, for working the Great Eastern Main Line, and would remain there for 13 years. In January 1948, No. 1264 passed into the ownership of British Railways, and in March it was allocated the number 61264, though this was not applied until October 1949. The class were given the power classification 5MT by BR.

In November 1960, No. 61264 was transferred from Parkeston Quay to Colwick Depot (38A), near Nottingham, for working the Great Central Main Line. It would remain there until it was withdrawn in December 1965.

=== Departmental service ===
That was not the end of its BR service however as it was transferred to departmental stock, and renumbered 29 in the Eastern Region departmental stock series. There it was used as a mobile boiler for heating carriages. It had its couplings removed so it couldn't haul trains, but could still propel itself.

29 was withdrawn from departmental stock in July 1967. It was initially stored, but in March 1968 it was sold for scrap.

== Preservation ==
However, luck was on its side: 61264 was sold to Woodham Brothers scrapyard, Barry Island, the only former LNER locomotive to be sent to Barry. By the time the locomotive was rescued from scrap in 1973, the 83rd engine to leave Barry, it was the last surviving ex-LNER locomotive not preserved. It was moved by road to the Great Central Railway in July 1976.

Restoration took some time; the boiler and firebox were in such poor condition that a new boiler and firebox seemed the only option, but steady work during the 1980s and 1990s restored the original boiler and the completed engine moved under its own power in 1997, finished in LNER Apple green as No. 1264. For the 2000 season, it was repainted in BR Black livery as 61264. It was withdrawn from service (mid-2008) for a 10-year overhaul at LNWR Crewe and, once finished moved to the North Yorkshire Moors Railway. 61264 returned to the mainline in 2014 with a test run in early January followed by double-heading the Winter Cumbrian Mountain Express from Manchester Victoria to Carlisle with LMS Stanier Class 5 4-6-0 45407 organised by the Railway Touring Company Limited.

From December 2012, the locomotive was based at the North Yorkshire Moors Railway and used on both mainline railtours alongside the NYMR's services between Grosmont and Whitby. In February 2018 the locomotive was repainted into LNER black with red lining. In 2020 it was withdrawn from service after discovery of cracks in the firebox.

In July 2022, the locomotive was moved to the Great Central Railway (Nottingham) and is in the process of undergoing a Network Rail standard overhaul. The overhaul is to include a new inner firebox, new tender tank and new tyres.

No. 61264 is one of two surviving Thompson Class B1 Locomotives, but the only LNER-built example, the other being BR-built 61306.
