= RMS Andania (1921) =

Brisith ocean liner

Coordinates: 62°36′N 15°09′W

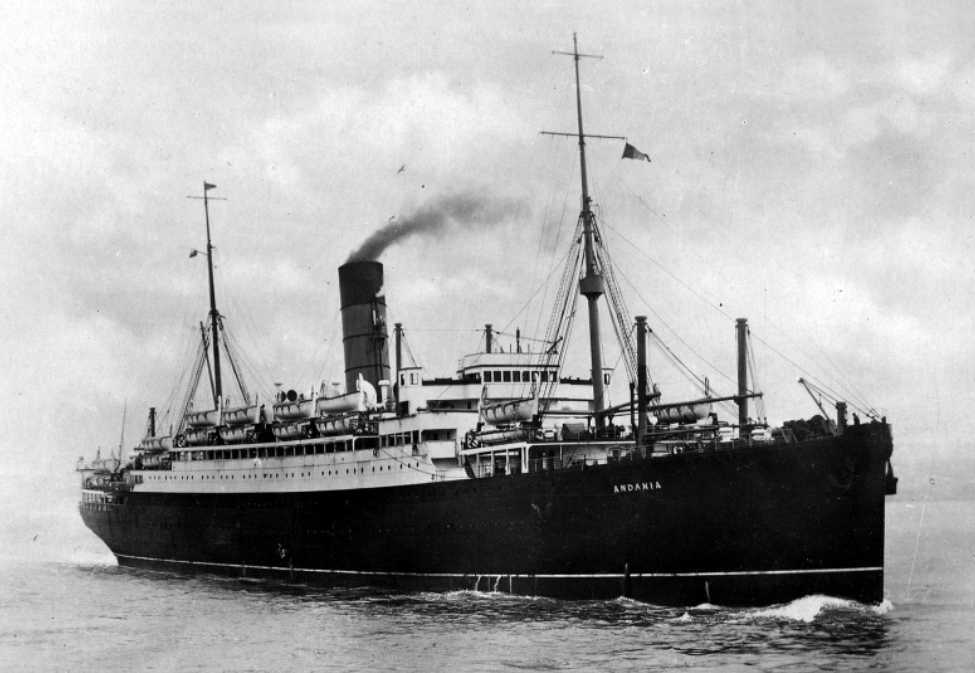
- The British ocean liner RMS Andania of the Cunard Line

History

United Kingdom
- Name: Andania
- Owner: Cunard Line
- Operator: Cunard Line
- Builder: Hawthorn Leslie and Company, Hebburn
- Launched: 1 November 1921
- Sponsored by: Lady Perley
- Maiden voyage: 1 June 1922
- Fate: Torpedoed and sunk 15–16 June 1940

General characteristics
- Class & type: A-class ocean liner
- Tonnage: 13,950 GRT
- Length: 158.55 m (520 ft 2 in)
- Beam: 19.90 m (65 ft 3 in)
- Propulsion: Double reduction steam turbines, 2 shafts
- Speed: 16 knots (30 km/h; 18 mph)
- Capacity: 1,700 passengers: 500 cabin class, 1,200 3rd class
- Armament: As armed merchant cruiser: 8 × 6 in (152 mm) guns; 2 × 3 in (76 mm) anti-aircraft guns; several machine guns; depth charges

RMS Andania was a British ocean liner launched in 1921. She was the first of six 14,000-ton A-class liners built for the Cunard Line in the early 1920s. The other ships were Antonia, Ausonia, Aurania, Ascania, and Alaunia.

== Construction ==
The ship was constructed in Hebburn, England by the shipbuilders Hawthorn Leslie and Company, was 538 feet (164 m) long, and measured just under 14,000 tons. She could carry more than 1,700 passengers and required 270 crew. She firstly worked on the Hamburg to New York City route, and later between Liverpool and Montreal.

== Use during World War II ==
At the start of World War II, Andania was requisitioned for use as an armed merchant cruiser (as was her sister ship Aurania) and armed with six old 6-inch (152 mm) guns, two 3-inch (76 mm) anti-aircraft guns and several machine guns. On 25 November 1939 she took up her naval duties as HMS Andania with the Northern Patrol.

== Fate ==
At 23:30 on 15 June 1940, HMS Andania was hit by a torpedo fired by the German submarine UA 70 miles (110 km) south of Reykjavík, Iceland. Three more torpedoes fired by UA missed. Andania stayed afloat for several hours but was too damaged to be saved. She sank early on 16 June. While other ships of the Northern Patrol were in the vicinity – HMS Derbyshire was actually within visual range – they had strict orders not to risk rescue when a submarine was suspected nearby. However, the entire crew on the Andania was rescued by the Icelandic fishing vessel Skallagrimur.

== Bibliography ==
- Hampshire, A. Cecil (1980). The Blockaders. London: William Kimber. ISBN 0-7183-0227-3.
- Osborne, Richard; Spong, Harry & Grover, Tom (2007). Armed Merchant Cruisers 1878–1945. Windsor, UK: World Warship Society. ISBN 978-0-9543310-8-5.
- "Andania II". cunard.co.uk. 2012.
