= LNER Class B1 =

LNER Class B1 may refer to two different type of steam locomotive operated by the London and North Eastern Railway:

- GCR Class 8C, two locomotives originally classified as B1 but reclassified as B18 in April 1943 to allow the B1 classification to be used for the LNER Thompson Class B1
- LNER Thompson Class B1
