= RMS Andania =

RMS Andania may refer to:

- RMS Andania (1913), a steamship sunk by World War I German submarine SM U-46 on 27 January 1918
- RMS Andania (1921), a Cunard Line steamship sunk by World War II German submarine UA on 16 June 1940
