= Barry Railway Class B1 =

Welsh two-cylinder 0-6-2T locomotives

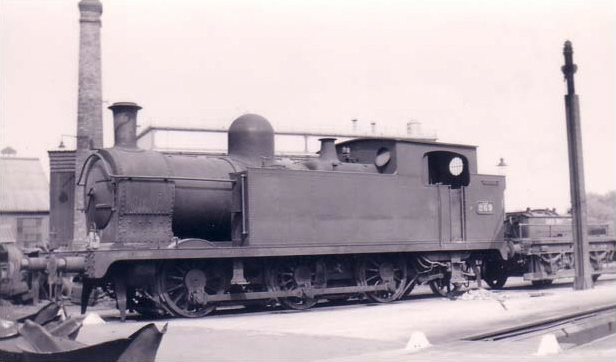
- Former Barry Railway Class B1 0-6-2T at Swindon in 1950, British Railways no. 269
Type and origin
- Power type: Steam
- Designer: J. H. Hosgood
- Builder: Sharp, Stewart & Co. (27), Vulcan Foundry (10), Société Franco-Belge (5)
- Build date: 1890–1900
- Total produced: 42
- Number rebuilt: Some rebuilt from 1924 with GWR boiler
Specifications
- Configuration
  - Whyte: 0-6-2T
  - UIC: C1 n2t
- Gauge: 4 ft 8 1/2 in (1,435 mm) standard gauge
- Driver dia.: 4 ft 4 in (1.321 m); Rebuilds: 4 ft 3 in (1.295 m)
- Trailing dia.: 3 ft 6 in (1.067 m)
- Loco weight: 55 long tons 3 cwt (123,500 lb or 56 t) (61.8 short tons); Rebuilds: 53 long tons 9 cwt (119,700 lb or 54.3 t) (59.9 short tons)
- Fuel type: Coal
- Boiler pressure: 160 psi (1.10 MPa); Rebuilds: 150 psi (1.03 MPa)
- Heating surface
  - Tubes: 1.875 in (0.048 m)
- Superheater
  - Heating area: 1,070 sq ft (99.406 m^{2})
- Cylinders: Two Inside
- Cylinder size: 17.5 in × 26 in (444 mm × 660 mm)
- Valve gear: Stephenson
Performance figures
- Tractive effort: 20,825 lbf (92.63 kN); Rebuilds: 19,906 lbf (88.55 kN)
Career
- Operators: BR » GWR » BR
- Withdrawn: 1932–1951
- Disposition: All scrapped

Barry Railway Class B1 were 0-6-2T steam tank locomotives of the Barry Railway in South Wales. They were designed by J. H. Hosgood and built by Sharp, Stewart & Co., Vulcan Foundry and Société Franco-Belge. The locomotive, though similar to the B class, differed in having an increased tank capacity of 1,630 imp gal (7,400 L; 1,960 US gal) compared with the 1,400 imp gal (6,400 L; 1,700 US gal) of the B class. The purpose of this was to enable them to take a train of empty wagons from Cadoxton Yard to Trehafod Junction without the need to refill the tank.

Their main duty was to take loaded coal trains from Trehafod Junction, and the pits on the Brecon & Merthyr, to Cadoxton Yard and return either with the empty wagons or occasionally pit props from Barry Docks. However they could also be seen pulling colliers' trains between Barry and Porth as well as excursion trains from various locations to Barry Island. Two locomotives, nos. 111 and 122, were used to take excursion trains from the Rhymney Railway to Barry for those visiting the National Eisteddfod held there in 1920. B1s could also be seen pulling the 'Ports Express' from Barry to Newcastle over the Barry Railway section of the journey between Barry and Cardiff.

The locomotives passed to the Great Western Railway in 1922 and 20 survived into British Railways ownership in 1948. However, all 20 had been withdrawn by 1952 and none were preserved.

== Build details ==
Year	Quantity	Builder	Serial numbers	Barry Numbers	GWR Numbers	Notes
1890	9	Sharp, Stewart & Co.	3598–3606	38–46	233–235, 238, 240–244	
1892	10	Vulcan Foundry	1336–1345	54–63	245–254	
1894	6	Sharp, Stewart & Co.	4044–4049	73–78	255–260	
1900	12	Sharp, Stewart & Co.	4607–4618	105–116	261–272	
1900	5	Société Franco-Belge	1272–1276	122–126	273–277	
