= RMS Antonia =

Ship

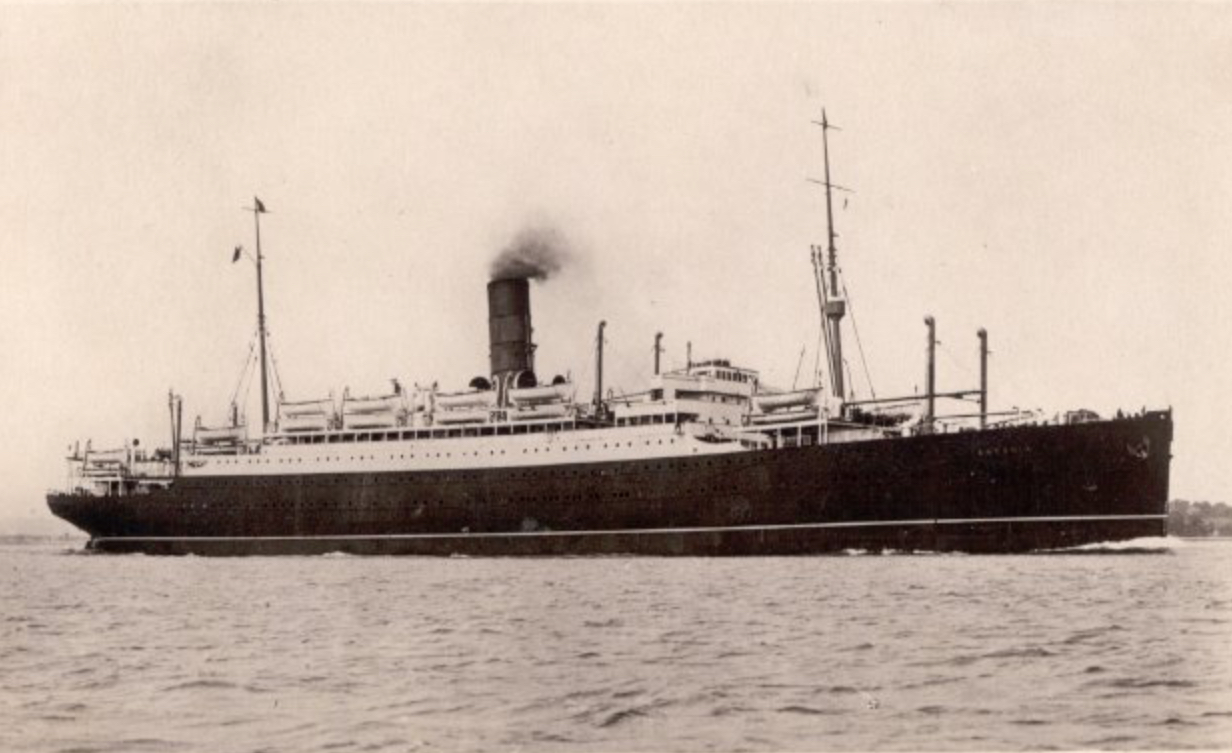
- The Antonia underway

History

United Kingdom
- Name: RMS Antonia
- Owner: Cunard Line
- Port of registry: United Kingdom
- Builder: Vickers Ltd, Barrow
- Yard number: 498
- Launched: 11 March 1921
- Maiden voyage: 15 June 1922
- Fate: Broken up at Troon in Scotland in 1948.

General characteristics
- Type: Ocean liner
- Tonnage: 13,867 GRT
- Length: 158.45 metres (519.8 ft)
- Beam: 19.90 metres (65.3 ft)
- Installed power: Double reduction steam turbines; 8,500 SHP
- Propulsion: Twin Propellers
- Speed: 15 knots
- Capacity: Passengers: 500 cabin class; 1,200 3rd class
- Crew: 271

RMS Antonia and her sister ship Andania were the first two of the six 14,000 ton "A" ocean liners built for Cunard in the early 1920s.

Antonia was built by Vickers Ltd., and launched in 1921. She made her maiden voyage from London to Montreal on 15 June 1922. She remained on Cunard's London-Canada service until 1928, when she joined Andania on the Cunard/Anchor/Donaldson joint service. Antonia, too, was requisitioned during World War II, and served as a troop transport and later as an armed merchant cruiser. She was purchased by the Admiralty as a repair ship in 1942, and renamed Wayland. She was scrapped in 1948.
