= LNER Thompson Class B1 =

Class of locomotives

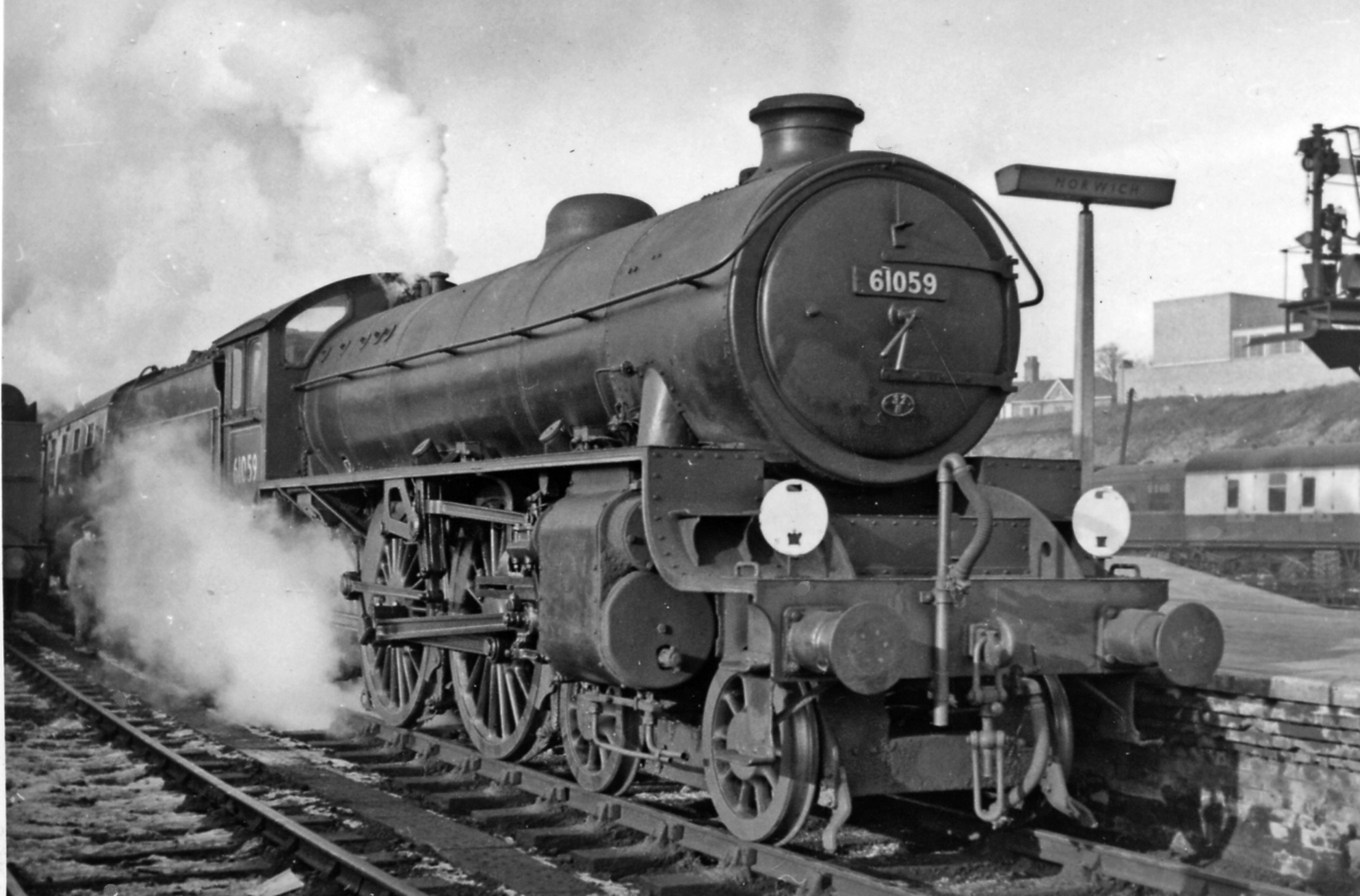
- 61059 at Norwich Thorpe, January 1958.
Type and origin
- Power type: Steam
- Designer: Edward Thompson
- Builder: Darlington Works (60); Gorton Works (10); North British Locomotive Co. (290); Vulcan Foundry (50)
- Build date: 1942–1952
- Total produced: 410
Specifications
- Configuration
  - Whyte: 4-6-0
  - UIC: 2′C h2
- Gauge: 4 ft 8 1/2 in (1,435 mm) standard gauge
- Leading dia.: 3 ft 2 in (0.965 m)
- Driver dia.: 6 ft 2 in (1.880 m)
- Axle load: 17 long tons 15 cwt (39,800 lb or 18 t)
- Loco weight: 71 long tons 3 cwt (159,400 lb or 72.3 t)
- Fuel type: Coal
- Boiler: LNER diagram 100A
- Boiler pressure: 225 psi (1.55 MPa)
- Cylinders: Two, outside
- Cylinder size: 20 in × 26 in (508 mm × 660 mm)
- Valve gear: Walschaerts
- Valve type: 10-inch (254 mm) piston valves
Performance figures
- Tractive effort: 26,878 lbf (119.56 kN)
Career
- Operators: LNER » BR
- Class: LNER: B1
- Power class: BR: 5MT
- Numbers: LNER:1000-1409, BR : 61000-61409
- Nicknames: Bongos, Antelopes
- Axle load class: Route Availability 5
- Locale: Eastern Region; North Eastern Region; Scottish Region
- Withdrawn: 1961–1967
- Preserved: (6)1264, 61306
- Disposition: Two preserved, remainder scrapped

The London and North Eastern Railway (LNER) Thompson Class B1 is a class of steam locomotive designed by Edward Thompson for medium mixed traffic work.

== Overview ==
It was the LNER's equivalent to the highly successful GWR Hall Class and the LMS Stanier Black Five, two-cylinder mixed traffic 4-6-0s. However, it had the additional requirement of having to be cheap because, due to wartime and post-war economies, the LNER, never the richest railway company, had to make savings.

Introduced in 1942, the first example, No. 8301, was named Springbok in honour of a visit by Jan Smuts. The first 40 of the class were named after breeds of antelopes and the like, and they became known as bongos after 8306 Bongo. 274 were built by the LNER. 136 were built by British Railways after nationalisation in 1948. The total number in stock at any one time, however, was only 409 as 61057 was involved in an accident in 1950 and was scrapped.

The prototype for the new B class (later classified B1) 4-6-0 was built at Darlington and entered service on 12 December 1942. It was the first 2-cylinder main-line locomotive constructed for the LNER since the grouping, such had been Sir Nigel Gresley's faith in the 3-cylinder layout. With cost saving a wartime priority the LNER's draughtsmen went to great lengths to re-use existing patterns, jigs and tools to economise on materials and labour. Extensive use was made of welding instead of steel castings. The boiler was derived from the Diagram 100A type fitted to the LNER Class B17 Sandringham 4-6-0s but with a larger grate area and an increase in boiler pressure to 225 pounds per square inch (1.55 MPa).

The appearance of No. 8301 (subsequently renumbered No. 1000) coincided with a visit to Britain by the Prime Minister of South Africa, Field Marshal Jan Smuts, and, as mentioned above, it was named Springbok. 18 other B1s took the names of LNER directors. Not that there were many B1s to be named during the war years: constraints on production meant that the first ten were not completed until 1944. However, Thompson then placed substantial orders with two outside builders: Vulcan Foundry and the North British Locomotive Company of Glasgow. Between April 1946 and April 1952 NBL built 290 B1s. Over the period the cost of each engine rose from £14,893 to £16,190. Vulcan Foundry contributed 50 at £15,300 apiece. Orders for the B1s, which became Nos. 61000–61409 under British Railways, totalled 410.

The B1s operated throughout LNER territory. The first batch was distributed among depots on the former Great Eastern Railway section: Ipswich, Norwich, and Stratford in London. They were an immediate success and were soon working the Liverpool Street–Harwich boat trains, the Hook Continental, the Day Continental and the Scandinavian. B1s were also a familiar sight on other top-link workings such as The East Anglian, The Broadsman, and The Fenman. During the 1950s over 70 B1s were stationed on ex-GE lines.

They enjoyed similar popularity on ex-Great Northern and Great Central territory. Engines based at Darnall, Sheffield were regularly rostered for the Master Cutler and South Yorkshireman expresses. Elsewhere there were substantial allocations in Scotland, West Yorkshire, and East Yorkshire.

If any fault is to be highlighted on the B1, it must be the ride quality. O. S. Nock often criticised the B1s for a poor ride, not something many were used to on the Gresley engines. The B1 was very cheap to build, but the final result was an engine that was somewhat lacking in the quality LNER men had come to expect. The two-cylinder layout gave the engines good starting power and excellent hill climbing abilities, but it also caused very bad hunting effects, a result of the use of cut-offs of up to 75% (a 10% advance on Gresley engines), and as such they were less kind on the passengers they carried than the B17s they replaced.

Overall, however, it was entirely necessary that the B1s be introduced, because the LNER was operating a large number of engines that were well past their economic life. It was somewhat ironic that among the engines that came under threat with the arrival of the B1s were the ones that Thompson admired the most: the engines of the North Eastern Railway designed by Vincent Raven (his father-in-law).

== Operation ==
B1s could be found over almost all of the LNER network, and that of the BR Eastern and North Eastern Regions.

The last scheduled steam-hauled passenger train to arrive in Liverpool Street was the up Day Continental on 9 September 1962 hauled by a B1 Class No. 61156.

== Accidents and incidents ==
- On 8 March 1950, locomotive No. 61057 was hauling an express passenger train at night, when it collided with the rear of a mineral train in fog, 3/4 mile (1.2 km) north east of Witham Junction; the passenger fireman and goods guard were killed. The locomotive was badly damaged; after being moved to Stratford Works, it and its tender were withdrawn and later scrapped.
- On 4 September 1953, locomotive No. 61046 was hauling a passenger train that was derailed at Bethnal Green, London when a set of points moved under it.
- In August 1961, locomotive No. 61229 was derailed at Malton, Yorkshire.

== Names ==
59 of the 410 locomotives were named. Early B1s were named after species of antelope, whilst later engines were named after members of the board of directors of the LNER. This led to the fact that the Class B1 contained the shortest name given to a British locomotive ((6)1018 Gnu) and one of the longest ((6)1221 Sir Alexander Erskine-Hill).

Note this does not include all engines

Number			Name	Notes
LNER	LNER 1946	BR	Name	Notes
8301	1000	61000	Springbok	
8302	1001	61001	Eland	
8303	1002	61002	Impala	
8304	1003	61003	Gazelle	
8305	1004	61004	Oryx	
8306	1005	61005	Bongo	
8307	1006	61006	Blackbuck	
8308	1007	61007	Klipspringer	
8309	1008	61008	Kudu	
8310	1009	61009	Hartebeeste	
-	1010	61010	Wildebeeste	
-	1011	61011	Waterbuck	
-	1012	61012	Puku	
-	1013	61013	Topi	
-	1014	61014	Oribi	
-	1015	61015	Duiker	
-	1016	61016	Inyala	
-	1017	61017	Bushbuck	
-	1018	61018	Gnu	
-	1019	61019	Nilghai	
-	1020	61020	Gemsbok	
-	1021	61021	Reitbok	
-	1022	61022	Sassaby	
-	1023	61023	Hirola	
-	1024	61024	Addax	
-	1025	61025	Pallah	
-	1026	61026	Ourebi	
-	1027	61027	Madoqua	
-	1028	61028	Umseke	
-	1029	61029	Chamois	
-	1030	61030	Nyala	
-	1031	61031	Reedbuck	
-	1032	61032	Stembok	
-	1033	61033	Dibatag	
-	1034	61034	Chiru	
-	1035	61035	Pronghorn	
-	1036	61036	Ralph Assheton	Its original name was going to be Korrigum but was changed to Ralph Assheton for unknown reasons.
-	1037	61037	Jairou	
-	1038	61038	Blacktail	
-	1039	61039	Steinbok	
-	1040	61040	Roedeer	
-	1089	61189	Sir William Gray	
-	1215	61215	William Henton Carver	
-	1221	61221	Sir Alexander Erskine-Hill	
-	1237	61237	Geoffrey H. Kitson	
-	1238	61238	Leslie Runciman	
-	1240	61240	Harry Hinchliffe	
-	1241	61241	Viscount Ridley	
-	1242	61242	Alexander Reith Gray	
-	1243	61243	Sir Harold Mitchell	
-	1244	61244	Strang Steel	
-	1245	61245	Murray of Elibank	
-	1246	61246	Lord Balfour of Burleigh	
-	1247	61247	Lord Burghley	
-	1248	61248	Geoffrey Gibbs	
-	1249	61249	Fitzherbert Wright	
-	1250	61250	A. Harold Bibby	
-	1251	61251	Oliver Bury	
-	-	61379	Mayflower	Only BR built engine to be named. Name carried by preserved 61306.

== Withdrawal ==
With the change in the policies of British Railways, the B1s were withdrawn long before their projected economic working life. Excepting No. 61057 which was destroyed in an accident in 1950, the first normal withdrawal was No. 61085 in November 1961. The remaining locomotives were withdrawn between 1962 and 1967.

Table of withdrawals
Year	Quantity in service at start of year	Quantity withdrawn	Locomotive numbers	Notes
1950	410	1	61057	Accident write-off
1961	409	1	61085	
1962	408	120	61000/05/11/36/43/45–46/48/63/77/86/91; 61106/24/36–37/64/70/83/86–87/93; 61201/03/06/11/17/26/31/34–36/39/41/46–47/53–54/60/65–68/71/80/82–84/86–87/90/95–98; 61301/11/16–17/32–33/35/39/52/62–64/66/68/71/73/76–77/79–81/91/95; 61405/08	
1963	288	62	61001/04/06/33/53/59/68–69/71/73–75/83/88/90/95; 61113/19/22/25–26/35/42/56/59–60/69/74–75/77/81; 61204–05/07/27/33/52/69–70/73/79; 61300/05/14/18/23/25/28/31/34/36/41/58–59/69/74–75/78/83/93/99; 61409	
1964	226	54	etc.	
1965	172	81	61264, etc.	61264 sold for preservation
1966	91	64	61008/13–14/17/22/24/26/29/32/35/40/42/50–51/55/58/89/92/99; 61101/03/16/21/31–33/40/45/48/58/61; 61210/23–24/32/37/40/50/61/63/81/93; 61302–03/07–08/15/19/22/26/29–30/42–45/49–50/60/84/86/90; 61403/06	
1967	27	27	61002/12/19/21/30/73; 61102/15/23/73/80/89/99; 61216/38/55/62/78/89; 61306/09/37/40/47/54/88; 61407	61306 sold for preservation

== Departmental service ==
After withdrawal from capital stock, 17 were taken into departmental stock where they were used as boilers for carriage heating. For this they had their couplers removed so they could not haul trains, though they could still propel themselves.

Number	Previous BR No.	Taken into dep'tal stock	Withdrawn	Disposal
17	61059	1963	1966	Scrapped (1966)
18	61181	1963	1965	Scrapped (1966)
19	61204	1963	1966	Scrapped (1966)
20	61205	1963	1965	Scrapped (1966)
21	61233	1963	1966	Scrapped (1966)
22	61252	1963	1964	Scrapped (1966)
23	61300	1963	1965	Scrapped (1966)
24 (1st)	61323	1963	1963	Scrapped (1964)
24 (2nd)	61375	1963	1966	Scrapped (1966)
25	61272	1965	1966	Scrapped (1966)
26	61138	1965	1967	Scrapped (1968)
27	61105	1965	1966	Scrapped (1966)
28	61194	1965	1966	Scrapped (1966)
29	61264	1965	1967	Woodham Brothers, later preserved
30	61050	1966	1968	Scrapped (1968)
31 (2nd)	61051	1966	1966	Scrapped (1966)
32 (2nd)	61315	1966	1968	Scrapped (1968)

== Preservation ==
Two have been preserved, these being 61264 and 61306. Both of these were built by North British Locomotive Company. No. 61264 has the distinction of being the only ex-LNER locomotive to be sent and later rescued from Barry Scrapyard.

Note: Loco numbers in bold mean their current number.

Number		Name	Makers No	Built	Withdrawn	Service Life	Base	Owners	Livery	Condition	Mainline Certified	Dual Braked	Photograph
LNER	BR	Name	Makers No	Built	Withdrawn	Service Life	Base	Owners	Livery	Condition	Mainline Certified	Dual Braked	Photograph
1264	61264	-	26165	5 December 1947	21 November 1965	17 Years, 11 months	Great Central Railway (Nottingham)	Thompson B1 Locomotive Trust	TBC	Under Overhaul	No, to be certified following overhaul	No	
*1306	**61306**	*Mayflower	26207	5 April 1948	30 September 1967	19 Years, 5 months	Crewe Diesel TMD	Locomotive Services Group	LNER Apple Green (Post War; British Railways Lettering)	Operational	Yes (2019 - ongoing)	Yes	

(* denotes historically inauthentic)

== Model railways ==
In 2007, Bachmann introduced a OO gauge model of the B1 in BR black livery.
