= RMS Alaunia (1925) =

British naval ship

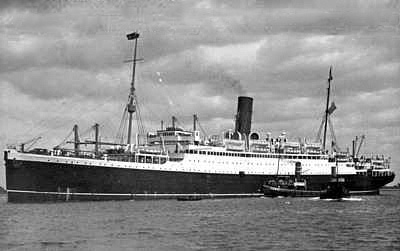

History

United Kingdom
- Name: RMS Alaunia
- Owner: Cunard Line
- Operator: Cunard Line
- Port of registry: Liverpool
- Route: Southampton - Quebec and Montreal
- Builder: John Brown & Co Clydebank
- Launched: 7 February 1925
- Completed: July 1925
- Maiden voyage: 24 July 1925
- Fate: Scrapped in Blyth, Northumberland, 1957

General characteristics
- Type: Ocean liner
- Tonnage: 14030 gross register tons
- Length: 538 ft
- Beam: 65 ft
- Depth: 43 ft
- Decks: Four
- Installed power: Four steam turbines double reduction geared
- Propulsion: Twin screw
- Speed: 15 knots
- Capacity: 633 Cabin, 1040 Third class
- Crew: 270

RMS Alaunia was an ocean liner built for the Cunard Line during the 1920s which served primarily on the Canadian route. She was requisitioned by the British Royal Navy during the Second World War and ultimately scrapped in 1957.

== Background ==
Alaunia was built by John Brown & Company in Scotland to augment the transatlantic passenger fleet of the Cunard Line. The ship entered service in July 1925 and was primarily employed on the Canadian route running from Southampton to Quebec and Montreal during the warm weather months and Halifax during the winter. She was one of a number of so-called intermediate liners built with fuel economy in mind. Designed with a single stack and straight stem bow with four passenger decks, the ship was propelled by two screws powered by four double reduction geared steam turbine engines that gave her a service speed of fifteen knots. Safety features included twelve watertight compartments divided by eleven bulkheads and twenty-eight lifeboats.

== Service ==
In August 1939 Alaunia was taken over by the Royal Navy for service as a troop transport and served in this capacity until 1944 when she was sold to the Royal Navy and refitted as a base repair ship at Gibraltar. Alaunia was sold for scrap to the British Iron & Steel Corporation and subsequently broken up at Blyth, England in 1957.
