= List of British Rail Class 47 locomotives =

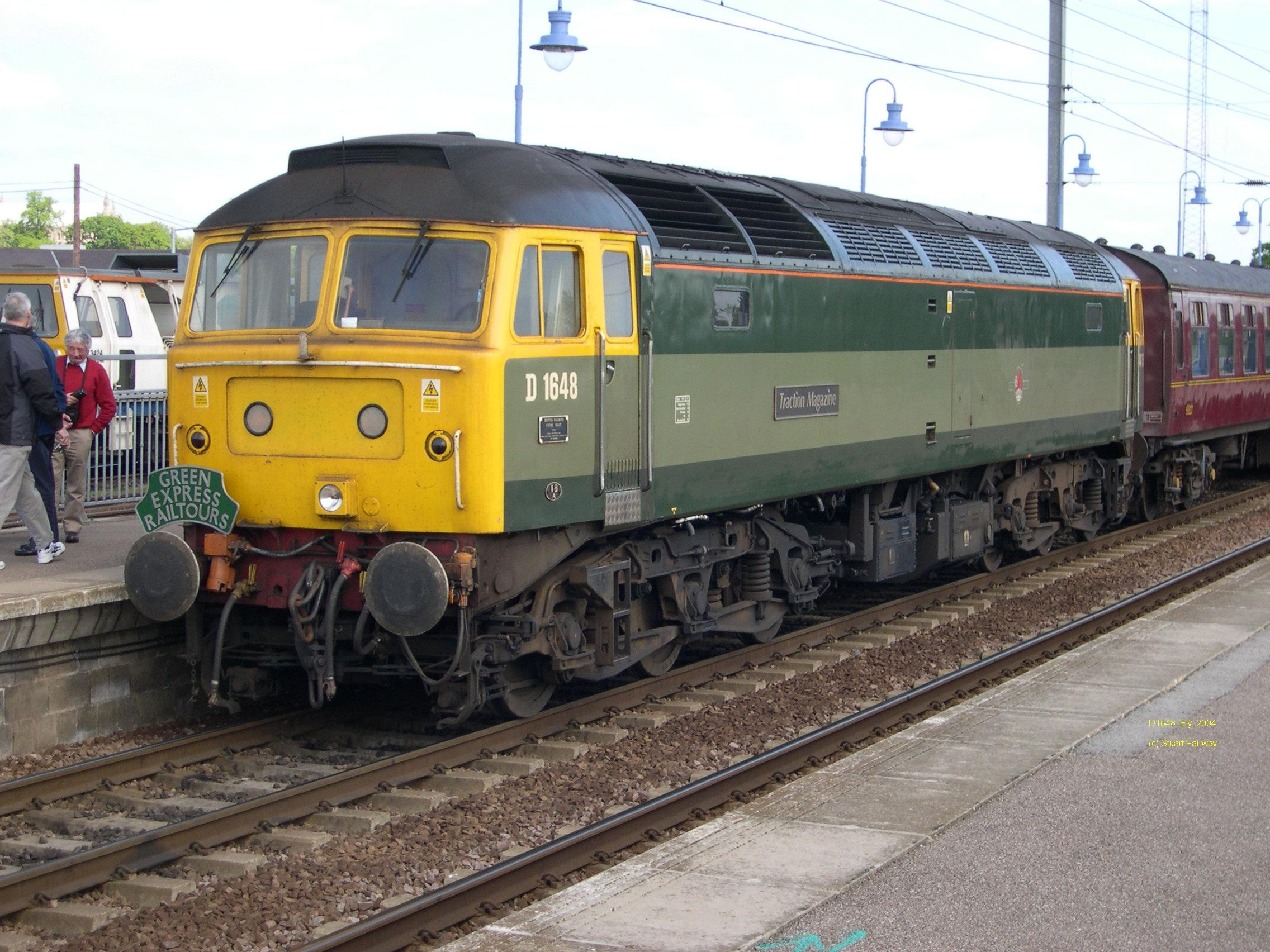
D1648 / 47064 / 47639 / 47851

The British Rail Class 47 or Brush Type 4 is a class of British railway diesel-electric locomotive that was developed in the 1960s by Brush Traction.

A total of 512 Class 47s were built at Brush's Falcon Works in Loughborough and at British Railways' Crewe Works between 1962 and 1968, which made them the most numerous class of British mainline diesel locomotive. The locomotives have had various renumberings during their existence; this table attempts to catalogue those changes.

As of January 2020, 78 locomotives still existed as Class 47s, with 33 having been rebuilt as Class 57; 32 Class 47s have been preserved, and 34 retained "operational status" on the mainline.

== Fleet list ==
Legend
~~Strikethrough~~	Denotes TOPS numbers allocated, but never actually carried by the locomotive.		
The D prefix to BTC numbers was generally dropped after August 1968.
Colour Key
In service	Stored	Scrapped	Preserved

Go to
D11XX	D15XX	D16XX	D17XX	D18XX	D19XX

Numbers						Builder	Name(s) (Note: 47001-47657, 47701-47716, 47901. 47001-47585, 47701-47712, 47901.)	Status	Commons Category
BTC	TOPS					Builder	Name(s)	Status	Commons Category
BTC	1st	2nd (Note: 47001-47657, 47701-47716, 47901.)	3rd (Note: 47705 and 47901.)	4th	5th	Builder	Name(s)	Status	Commons Category
D1100	47298					BR	Pegasus; Kestrel	Cut by CF Booth, Rotherham, May 2007	Category:British Rail Class 47 D1100 (TOPS 47298) on Wikimedia Commons
D1101	47518					BR		Cut by MC Metals, Glasgow, October 1994	Category:British Rail Class 47 D1101 (TOPS 47518) on Wikimedia Commons
D1102	47519					BR		Cut by T. J. Thomson, Stockton, October 2005	
D1103	47520					BR	Thunderbird	Cut by CF Booth, Rotherham, July 1998	Category:British Rail Class 47 D1103 (TOPS 47520) on Wikimedia Commons
D1104	47521					BR		Cut by MRJ Phillips, Crewe Works, July 1995	Category:British Rail Class 47 D1104 (TOPS 47521) on Wikimedia Commons
D1105	47522					BR	Doncaster Enterprise	Cut by EWS, Wigan CDRC, July 2000	Category:British Rail Class 47 D1105 (TOPS 47522) on Wikimedia Commons
D1106	47523					BR	Railfreight	Cut by EWS, Wigan CDRC, May 2000	Category:British Rail Class 47 D1106 (TOPS 47523) on Wikimedia Commons
D1107	47524					BR		Cut by CF Booths, Rotherham, August 2019	Category:British Rail Class 47 D1107 (TOPS 47524) on Wikimedia Commons
D1108	47525					BR		Cut by European Metal Recycling, Kingsbury, August 2010	
D1109	47526					BR		Stored at Carnforth	
D1110	47527					BR	Kettering	Cut by MRJ Phillips, Bristol Bath Road TMD, November 1995	
D1111	47528					BR	The Queen's Own Mercian Yeomanry	Cut by Ron Hull, Rotherham, June 2008	Category:British Rail Class 47 D1111 (TOPS 47528) on Wikimedia Commons
D1500	47401	D1500	47401			Brush	North Eastern; Star of the East	Preserved by 47401 Project at Midland Railway Centre	Category:British Rail Class 47 D1500 (TOPS 47401) on Wikimedia Commons
D1501	47402	D1501	47402	D1501		Brush	Gateshead	Preserved at Peak Rail	Category:British Rail Class 47 D1501 (TOPS 47402) on Wikimedia Commons
D1502	47403	~~968033~~				Brush	The Geordie (Note: 47403 was named The Geordie at Newcastle on 23 February 1982.)	Cut by J&S Metals, Crewe Gresty Lane October 1994	
D1503	47404					Brush	Hadrian	Cut by Vic Berry, Leicester, January 1990	Category:British Rail Class 47 D1503 (TOPS 47404) on Wikimedia Commons
D1504	47405					Brush	Northumbria	Cut by A Hampton, Crewe Works, October 1988	Category:British Rail Class 47 D1504 (TOPS 47405) on Wikimedia Commons
D1505	47406					Brush	Rail Riders	Cut by MRJ Phillips, Frodingham, December 1995	Category:British Rail Class 47 D1505 (TOPS 47406) on Wikimedia Commons
D1506	47407					Brush	Aycliffe	Cut by MRJ Phillips, Frodingham, December 1995	Category:British Rail Class 47 D1506 (TOPS 47407) on Wikimedia Commons
D1507	47408					Brush	Finsbury Park	Cut by Vic Berry, Leicester, March 1989	
D1508	47409					Brush	David Lloyd George	Cut by Vic Berry, Leicester, May 1989	Category:British Rail Class 47 D1508 (TOPS 47409) on Wikimedia Commons
D1509	47410					Brush		Cut by Vic Berry, Leicester, January 1990	Category:British Rail Class 47 D1509 (TOPS 47410) on Wikimedia Commons
D1510	47411					Brush	The Geordie	Cut by Eurofriend, Frodingham, December 1994	
D1511	47412					Brush		Cut by CF Booth, Rotherham, February 1992	
D1512	47413					Brush		Cut by MRJ Phillips, Frodingham, December 1995	Category:British Rail Class 47 D1512 (TOPS 47413) on Wikimedia Commons
D1513	47414					Brush		Cut by Vic Berry, Leicester, May 1989	Category:British Rail Class 47 D1513 (TOPS 47414) on Wikimedia Commons
D1514	47415					Brush		Cut by Vic Berry, Leicester, January 1990	Category:British Rail Class 47 D1514 (TOPS 47415) on Wikimedia Commons
D1515	47416					Brush	Atlas	Cut by BREL, Crewe Works, June 1987	Category:British Rail Class 47 D1515 (TOPS 47416) on Wikimedia Commons
D1516	47417	D1516				Brush		Preserved by 47401 Project at Midland Railway Centre	Category:British Rail Class 47 D1516 (TOPS 47417) on Wikimedia Commons
D1517	47418					Brush		Cut by MRJ Phillips, Frodingham, December 1995	Category:British Rail Class 47 D1517 (TOPS 47418) on Wikimedia Commons
D1518	47419					Brush		Cut by Vic Berry, Leicester, January 1990	
D1519	47420					Brush		Cut by Vic Berry, Leicester, March 1989	Category:British Rail Class 47 D1519 (TOPS 47420) on Wikimedia Commons
D1520	47421					Brush	The Brontës of Haworth	Cut by MRJ Phillips, Crewe Works, March 1997	
D1521	47001					Brush	City of Bristol	Cut by CF Booth, Rotherham, December 1993	Category:British Rail Class 47 D1521 (TOPS 47001) on Wikimedia Commons
D1522	47002					Brush	Sea Eagle	Cut by CF Booth, Rotherham, June 1994	Category:British Rail Class 47 D1522 (TOPS 47002) on Wikimedia Commons
D1523	47003					Brush	Wild Swan	Cut by CF Booth, Rotherham, July 1992	
D1524	47004	D1524				Brush	Old Oak Common Traction & Rolling Stock Depot	Preserved at Embsay and Bolton Abbey Steam Railway	Category:British Rail Class 47 D1524 (TOPS 47004) on Wikimedia Commons
D1525	47422					Brush	Trafalgar	Cut by CF Booth, Rotherham, November 1992	Category:British Rail Class 47 D1525 (TOPS 47422) on Wikimedia Commons
D1526	47005					Brush	Harrier	Cut by CF Booth, Rotherham, December 1992	
D1527	47423					Brush	Sceptre	Cut by MRJ Phillips, Old Oak Common TMD, April 1997	Category:British Rail Class 47 D1527 (TOPS 47423) on Wikimedia Commons
D1528	47006					Brush		Cut by CF Booth, Rotherham, February 1993	
D1529	47007					Brush	Stratford	Cut by CF Booth, Rotherham, February 1994	Category:British Rail Class 47 D1529 (TOPS 47007) on Wikimedia Commons
D1530	47008					Brush	Peregrine; Hornet	Cut by Bird Group, Stratford TMD, March 1994	
D1531	47424					Brush	The Brontës of Haworth	Cut by CF Booth, Rotherham, January 1994	Category:British Rail Class 47 D1531 (TOPS 47424) on Wikimedia Commons
D1532	47009					Brush	Guillemot	Cut by CF Booth, Rotherham, April 1992	
D1533	47425					Brush	Holbeck	Cut by MRJ Phillips, Old Oak Common TMD, April 1997	Category:British Rail Class 47 D1533 (TOPS 47425) on Wikimedia Commons
D1534	47426					Brush	Dibatag	Cut by MRJ Phillips, Old Oak Common TMD, May 1997	
D1535	47427					Brush		Cut by MC Metals, Glasgow, April 1992	
D1536	47428					Brush		Cut by Vic Berry, Leicester, April 1990	
D1537	47010					Brush	Xancidae	Cut by CF Booth, Rotherham, December 1993	
D1538	47011					Brush		Cut by CF Booth, Rotherham, January 1994	
D1539	47012					Brush	Magpie	Cut by CF Booth, Rotherham, April 1994	Category:British Rail Class 47 D1539 (TOPS 47012) on Wikimedia Commons
D1540	47013					Brush		Cut by CF Booth, Doncaster Works, September 1988	Category:British Rail Class 47 D1540 (TOPS 47013) on Wikimedia Commons
D1541	47429					Brush		Cut by A Hampton, Crewe Works, January 1989	Category:British Rail Class 47 D1541 (TOPS 47429) on Wikimedia Commons
D1542	47430					Brush		Cut by MRJ Phillips, Old Oak Common TMD, May 1997	
D1543	47014					Brush		Cut by CF Booth, Rotherham, April 1992	
D1544	47015					Brush		Cut by CF Booth, Rotherham, January 1994	
D1545	47431					Brush	Silurian	Cut by MRJ Phillips, Old Oak Common TMD, April 1997	
D1546	47016	1546				Brush	The Toleman Group; Atlas	Cut by EWS, Wigan CRDC, April 2000	
D1547	47432					Brush		Cut by CF Booth, Bristol Bath Road TMD, September 1995	Category:British Rail Class 47 D1547 (TOPS 47432) on Wikimedia Commons
D1548	47433					Brush		Cut by MRJ Phillips, Crewe Works, August 1996	
D1549	47434					Brush	Pride in Huddersfield	Cut by CF Booth, Rotherham, November 1993	Category:British Rail Class 47 D1549 (TOPS 47434) on Wikimedia Commons
D1550	47435					BR		Cut by CF Booth, Rotherham, December 1993	
D1551	47529					BR		Cut by BREL, Crewe Works, April 1987	
D1552	47436					BR	Buznak	Cut by MC Metals, Glasgow, August 1993	Category:British Rail Class 47 D1552 (TOPS 47436) on Wikimedia Commons
D1553	47437					BR		Cut by CF Booth, Rotherham, May 1989	
D1554	47438					BR		Cut by MRJ Phillips, Old Oak Common TMD, June 1997	
D1555	47439					BR		Cut by MRJ Phillips, Crewe Works, March 1997	
D1556	47440					BR		Cut by MRJ Phillips, Old Oak Common TMD, April 1997	
D1557	47441					BR		Cut by MRJ Phillips, Old Oak Common TMD, June 1997	Category:British Rail Class 47 D1557 (TOPS 47411) on Wikimedia Commons
D1558	47442					BR		Cut by MRJ Phillips, Crewe Works, April 1997	Category:British Rail Class 47 D1558 (TOPS 47442) on Wikimedia Commons
D1559	47443					BR	North Eastern	Cut by MRJ Phillips, Crewe Works, November 1996	Category:British Rail Class 47 D1559 (TOPS 47443) on Wikimedia Commons
D1560	47444					BR	University of Nottingham	Cut by MRJ Phillips, Crewe Works, July 1995	
D1561	47445					BR		Cut by CF Booth, Rotherham, March 1994	Category:British Rail Class 47 D1561 (TOPS 47445) on Wikimedia Commons
D1562						BR		Cut by British Rail, Crewe Works, September 1971	
D1563	47446					BR	Galtee More (Note: Named after the race horse not the place)	Cut by MRJ Phillips, Old Oak Common TMD, May 1997	
D1564	47447					BR		Cut by CF Booth, Rotherham, March 1994	
D1565	47448					BR	Gateshead	Cut by CF Booth, Rotherham, February 1996	Category:British Rail Class 47 D1565 (TOPS 47448) on Wikimedia Commons
D1566	47449	~~89466~~	D1566			BR	Oribi; Orion	Preserved by Llangollen Diesel Group at Llangollen Railway	Category:British Rail Class 47 D1566 (TOPS 47449) on Wikimedia Commons
D1567	47450					BR	Blackbuck	Cut by CF Booth, Rotherham, February 1993	Category:British Rail Class 47 D1567 (TOPS 47450) on Wikimedia Commons
D1568	47451					BR	Hyperion	Cut by CF Booth, Rotherham, February 1994	Category:British Rail Class 47 D1568 (TOPS 47451) on Wikimedia Commons
D1569	47452					BR	Aycliffe	Cut by MRJ Phillips, Old Oak Common TMD, April 1997	
D1570	47017					BR		Cut by CF Booth, Rotherham, February 1992	
D1571	47453					BR	Eland	Cut by MRJ Phillips, Old Oak Common TMD, April 1997	
D1572	47018					BR		Cut by Coopers Metals, Sheffield, March 1994	
D1573	47019					BR		Cut by MRJ Phillips, Eastleigh Works, March 1997	Category:British Rail Class 47 D1573 (TOPS 47019) on Wikimedia Commons
D1574	47454					BR	Velocity	Cut by CF Booth, Rotherham, February 1994	
D1575	47455					BR		Cut by MRJ Phillips, Crewe Works, June 1995	Category:British Rail Class 47 D1575 (TOPS 47455) on Wikimedia Commons
D1576	47456					BR		Cut by CF Booth, Rotherham, January 1993	Category:British Rail Class 47 D1576 (TOPS 47456) on Wikimedia Commons
D1577	47457					BR	Gazelle; Ben Line	Cut by MRJ Phillips, Old Oak Common TMD, May 1997	
D1578	47458					BR	County of Cambridgeshire	Cut by CF Booth, Rotherham, February 1996	Category:British Rail Class 47 D1578 (TOPS 47458) on Wikimedia Commons
D1579	47459					BR	Perseus	Cut by CF Booth, Rotherham, December 1992	Category:British Rail Class 47 D1579 (TOPS 47459) on Wikimedia Commons
D1580	47460					BR	Triton; Great Eastern	Cut by CF Booth, Rotherham, April 1993	
D1581	47461					BR	Charles Rennie Mackintosh	Cut by CF Booth, Rotherham, December 1993	Category:British Rail Class 47 D1581 (TOPS 47461) on Wikimedia Commons
D1582	47462					BR	Cambridge Traction & Rolling Stock Depot	Cut by Harry Needle Railroad Company, Toton TMD, March 2003	Category:British Rail Class 47 D1582 (TOPS 47462) on Wikimedia Commons
D1583	47020	47556	47844			BR	Duke of Cornwall; Derby & Derbyshire Chamber of Commerce and Industry	Cut by Harry Needle Railroad Company, Crewe Works, October 2004	Category:British Rail Class 47 D1583 (TOPS 47020, 47556, 47844) on Wikimedia Commons
D1584	~~47021~~	47531	47974	47531	47775	BR	Respite	Cut by ?, Crewe TMD, April 2006	Category:British Rail Class 47 D1584 (TOPS 47531, 47974, 47775) on Wikimedia Commons
D1585	~~47022~~	47542				BR		Cut by Bird Group, Stratford TMD, March 1994	
D1586	47463					BR		Cut by MRJ Phillips, Crewe Works, November 1996	
D1587	47464					BR		Cut by BREL, Crewe Works, November 1988	
D1588	~~47023~~	47543				BR		Cut by CF Booth, Rotherham, April 1998	Category:British Rail Class 47 D1588 (TOPS 47543) on Wikimedia Commons
D1589	47465					BR	Minerva	Cut by MRJ Phillips, Old Oak Common TMD, April 1997	
D1590	47466					BR		Cut by MRJ Phillips, Crewe Works, March 1997	
D1591	47024	47557	47721			BR	Saint Bede	Cut by European Metal Recycling, Kingsbury, May 2007	
D1592	~~47025~~	47544				BR		Cut by MC Metals, Glasgow, June 1991	Category:British Rail Class 47 D1592 (TOPS 47544) on Wikimedia Commons
D1593	47467					BR		Cut by EWS, Wigan CRDC, April 2000	
D1594	47468	47300				BR		Cut by Harry Needle Railroad Company, Kingsbury, May 2002	
D1595	47469					BR	Glasgow Chamber of Commerce	Cut by MC Metals, Glasgow, November 1989	
D1596	47470					BR	Glen Log; University of Edinburgh (Note: 47470 was named University of Edinburgh by David Steel at Edinburgh on 6 July 1983.)	Cut by MRJ Phillips, Crewe Works, June 1995	
D1597	47026	47597	47741			BR	Resilient	Cut by European Metal Recycling, Kingsbury, May 2008	Category:British Rail Class 47 D1597 (TOPS 47026, 47597, 47741) on Wikimedia Commons
D1598	47471					BR	Norman Tunna G.C. (Note: 47471 was named Norman Tunna G.C. at Liverpool Lime Street on 15 November 1982.)	Cut by Ron Hull, Rotherham, February 2005	
D1599	47027	47558	47722			BR	Mayflower; The Queen Mother	Cut by European Metal Recycling, Kingsbury, May 2007	Category:British Rail Class 47 D1599 (TOPS 47027, 47558, 47722) on Wikimedia Commons
D1600	47472	97472	47472			BR	Confederation of British Industry	Cut by MRJ Phillips, Old Oak Common TMD, May 1997	Category:British Rail Class 47 D1600 (TOPS 47472, 97472) on Wikimedia Commons
D1601	47473					BR	Sceptre	Cut by MRJ Phillips, Crewe Works, March 1998	
D1602	47474					BR	Sir Rowland Hill	Cut by T.J.Thomson, Stockton, November 2005	Category:British Rail Class 47 D1602 (TOPS 47474) on Wikimedia Commons
D1603	47475					BR	Restive	Cut by T.J.Thomson, Stockton, March 2008	
D1604	47476					BR	Night Mail	Cut by CF Booth, Rotherham, April 2004	Category:British Rail Class 47 D1604 (TOPS 47476) on Wikimedia Commons
D1605	47028	47559	47759			BR	Sir Joshua Reynolds	Cut by Ron Hull, Rotherham, January 2008	
D1606	47029	47635				BR	Jimmy Milne	Preserved at Epping Ongar Railway	
D1607	47477					BR		Cut by CF Booth, Rotherham, November 1992	Category:British Rail Class 47 D1607 (TOPS 47477) on Wikimedia Commons
D1608	47478					BR		Cut by European Metal Recycling, Kingsbury, April 2006	Category:British Rail Class 47 D1608 (TOPS 47478) on Wikimedia Commons
D1609	47030	47618	47836	47618	47780	BR	Fair Rosamund	Cut by European Metal Recycling, Kingsbury, August 2007	Category:British Rail Class 47 D1609 (TOPS 47030, 47618, 47836, 47780) on Wikimedia Commons
D1610	47031	47560	47832			BR	Tamar; Solway Princess	West Coast Railways	Category:British Rail Class 47 D1610 (TOPS 47031, 47560, 47832) on Wikimedia Commons
D1611	47032	47662	47817	57311		BR	The Institute of Mechanical Engineers; Parker; Thunderbird	Direct Rail Services	Category:British Rail Class 47 D1611 (TOPS 47032, 47662, 47817) on Wikimedia Commons Category:British Rail Class 57 57311 on Wikimedia Commons
D1612	47479					BR	Track 29	Cut by CF Booth, Rotherham, January 1993	Category:British Rail Class 47 D1612 (TOPS 47479) on Wikimedia Commons
D1613	47033					BR	Royal Logistic Corps	Cut by T.J.Thomson, Stockton, March 2008	
D1614	47034	47561	97561	47973		BR	Derby Evening Telegraph	Cut by MRJ Phillips, Crewe Works, March 1997	Category:British Rail Class 47 D1614 (TOPS 47034, 47561, 97561, 47973) on Wikimedia Commons
D1615	47035	47594	47739			BR	Resourceful; Robin of Templecombe	GB Railfreight	
D1616	47480	97480	47971			BR	Robin Hood; North Star	Cut by Harry Needle Railroad Company, Kingsbury, November 2001	
D1617	47036	47562	47672	47562	47760	BR	Sir William Burrell; Restless; Ribblehead Viaduct	West Coast Railways	Category:British Rail Class 47 D1617 (TOPS 47036, 47562, 47672, 47760) on Wikimedia Commons
D1618	47037	47563	47831	57310		BR	Woman's Guild; Bolton Wanderer; Kyrano; Pride of Cumbria	Direct Rail Services	Category:British Rail Class 47 D1618 (TOPS 47037, 47563, 47831) on Wikimedia Commons Category:British Rail Class 57 57310 on Wikimedia Commons
D1619	47038	47564	47761			BR	COLOSSUS	Spares loco, Midland Railway Centre	
D1620	47039	47565				BR	Responsive	Cut by CF Booth, Rotherham, February 2004	Category:British Rail Class 47 D1620 (TOPS 47039, 47565) on Wikimedia Commons
D1621	47040	47642	47766			BR	Strathisla; Resolute	Cut by Harry Needle Railroad Company, Toton TMD, July 2004	Category:British Rail Class 47 D1621 (TOPS 47040, 47642, 47766) on Wikimedia Commons
D1622	47041	47630	47764			BR	Mentor; Resounding	Cut by EMR?, Kingsbury, August 2005	
D1623	47042	47586	47676			BR	Northamptonshire	Cut by CF Booth, Rotherham, April 1998	Category:British Rail Class 47 D1623 (TOPS 47042, 47586, 47676) on Wikimedia Commons
D1624	47043	47566				BR		Cut by CF Booth, Rotherham, March 2006	
D1625	47044	47567	47725			BR	Red Star; Red Star ISO 9002; The Railway Mission	Cut by CF Booth, Rotherham, May 2006	
D1626	47045	47568	47726			BR	Royal Engineers Postal & Courier Service; Royal Logistic Corps P & C Services; Progress; Manchester Airport Progress	Cut by European Metal Recycling, Kingsbury, April 2007	Category:British Rail Class 47 D1626 (TOPS 47045, 47568, 47726) on Wikimedia Commons
D1627	47481					BR	Sunstar	Cut by Sims Metals, Beeston, June 2003	
D1628	47046	47601	47901			BR		Cut by MC Metals, Glasgow, February 1992	
D1629	47047	47569	47727			BR	The Gloucestershire Regiment; The Duke of Edinburgh's Award; Caerphilly Castle; Rebecca	GB Railfreight	Category:British Rail Class 47 D1629 (TOPS 47047, 47569, 47727) on Wikimedia Commons
D1630	47048	47570	47849			BR	Cadeirian Bangor Cathedral	Cut by CF Booth, Rotherham, May 2002	Category:British Rail Class 47 D1630 (TOPS 47048, 47570, 47849) on Wikimedia Commons
D1631	47049					BR	GEFCO	Cut by EWS, Wigan CRDC, January 2000	
D1632	47050					BR		Cut by CF Booth, Tinsley TMD, May 1996	
D1633	47051					BR	Great Snipe	Cut by EWS, Wigan CRDC, May 2000	Category:British Rail Class 47 D1633 (TOPS 47051) on Wikimedia Commons
D1634	47052					BR		Cut by Garrett, Basford Hall, May 2003	
D1635	47053					BR	Impala; Dollands Moor International	Cut by European Metal Recycling, Kingsbury, March 2007	Category:British Rail Class 47 D1635 (TOPS 47053) on Wikimedia Commons
D1636	47482					BR		Cut by MRJ Phillips, Crewe Works, June 1993	
D1637	47483					BR		Cut by MRJ Phillips, Crewe Works, July 1993	Category:British Rail Class 47 D1637 (TOPS 47483) on Wikimedia Commons
D1638	47054					BR		Cut by CF Booth, Rotherham, November 1993	
D1639	47055	47652	47807	57304		BR	Lion of Vienna; Gordon Tracy; Pride of Cheshire	Direct Rail Services	Category:British Rail Class 47 D1639 (TOPS 47055, 47652, 47807) on Wikimedia Commons Category:British Rail Class 57 57304 on Wikimedia Commons
D1640	47056	47654	47809	47783		BR	Finsbury Park; Saint Peter	Cut by Ron Hull, Rotherham, October 2007	
D1641	~~47057~~	47532				BR	Blue Peter	Cut by EWS, Wigan CRDC, February 2001	
D1642	~~47058~~	47547				BR	University of Oxford	Cut by Ron Hull, Rotherham, March 2005	Category:British Rail Class 47 D1642 (TOPS 47547) on Wikimedia Commons
D1643	47059	47631	47765			BR	Ressalder	Preserved at East Lancashire Railway	Category:British Rail Class 47 D1643 (TOPS 47059, 47631, 47765) on Wikimedia Commons
D1644	47060	57008				BR	Halewood Silver Jubilee 1988; Freightliner Explorer; Telford International Railfreight Park June 2009	Direct Rail Services	
D1645	47061	47649	47830			BR	Basford Hall Shunter; Beeching's Legacy	Freightliner	
D1646	~~47062~~	47545	97545	47972		BR	The Royal Army Ordnance Corps	Cut by CF Booth, Rotherham, March 2010	Category:British Rail Class 47 D1646 (TOPS 47545, 97545, 47972) on Wikimedia Commons
D1647	47063					BR		Cut by MRJ Phillips, Crewe Works, November 1996	
D1648	47064	47639	47851	D1648		BR	Industry Year 1986; Traction Magazine	West Coast Railways	Category:British Rail Class 47 D1648 (TOPS 47064, 47639, 47851) on Wikimedia Commons
D1649	~~47065~~	47535				BR	University of Leicester	Cut by Harry Needle Railroad Company, Old Oak Common TMD, April 2004	Category:British Rail Class 47 D1649 (TOPS 47535) on Wikimedia Commons
D1650	47066	47661	47816			BR	Bristol Bath Road Quality Approved	Locomotive Services Limited	Category:British Rail Class 47 D1650 (TOPS 47066, 47661, 47816) on Wikimedia Commons
D1651	~~47067~~	47533				BR		Cut by Eurofriend, Old Oak Common TMD, February 1995	Category:British Rail Class 47 D1651 (TOPS 47533) on Wikimedia Commons
D1652	47068	47632	47848			BR	Newton Abbot Festival of Transport; Titan Star	West Coast Railways	Category:British Rail Class 47 D1652 (TOPS 47068, 47632, 47848) on Wikimedia Commons
D1653	47069	47638	47845	57301		BR	County of Kent; Scott Tracy; Goliath	Direct Rail Services	Category:British Rail Class 47 D1653 (TOPS 47069, 47638, 47845) on Wikimedia Commons Category:British Rail Class 57 57301 on Wikimedia Commons
D1654	47070	47620	47835	47799		BR	Windsor Castle; Prince Henry	Preserved at Eden Valley Railway	Category:British Rail Class 47 D1654 (TOPS 47070, 47620, 47835, 47799) on Wikimedia Commons
D1655	~~47071~~	47536				BR	Solario	Cut by CF Booth, Rotherham, October 2005	Category:British Rail Class 47 D1655 (TOPS 47536) on Wikimedia Commons
D1656	47072	47609	47834	47798		BR	FIRE FLY; Prince William	Preserved at National Railway Museum	Category:British Rail Class 47 D1656 (TOPS 47072, 47609, 47834, 47798) on Wikimedia Commons
D1657	~~47073~~	47537	47772			BR	Sir Gwynedd / County of Gwynedd (Note: 47537 was named Sir Gwynedd/County of Gwynedd at Holyhead on 1 November 1982.)	West Coast Railways	Category:British Rail Class 47 D1657 (TOPS 47537, 47772) on Wikimedia Commons
D1658	47074	47646	47852			BR		Cut by CF Booth, Rotherham, August 1992	Category:British Rail Class 47 D1658 (TOPS 47074, 47646, 47852) on Wikimedia Commons
D1659	47075	47645				BR	Robert F. Fairlie Loco Engineer 1831-1885	Cut by MC Metals, Glasgow, April 1992	
D1660	47076	47625	47749			BR	City of Truro; Resplendent; Atlantic College; Demelza	GB Railfreight	Category:British Rail Class 47 D1660 (TOPS 47076, 47625, 47749) on Wikimedia Commons
D1661	47077	47613	47840			BR	NORTH STAR	Preserved by DEPG at North Yorkshire Moors Railway	Category:British Rail Class 47 D1661 North Star (TOPS 47077, 47613, 47840) on Wikimedia Commons
D1662	47484					BR	ISAMBARD KINGDOM BRUNEL	Preserved by Pioneer Diesel Locomotive Group at Wishaw	Category:British Rail Class 47 D1662 (TOPS 47484) on Wikimedia Commons
D1663	47078	47628				BR	SIR DANIEL GOOCH	Cut by Ron Hull, Rotherham, March 2006	Category:British Rail Class 47 D1663 (TOPS 47078, 47628) on Wikimedia Commons
D1664	47079	57009				BR	George Jackson Churchward; G.J. Churchward; Freightliner Venturer	Direct Rail Services	Category:British Rail Class 47 D1664 (TOPS 47079) on Wikimedia Commons Category:British Rail Class 57 57009 on Wikimedia Commons
D1665	47080	47612	47838	47612	47779	BR	TITAN	Cut by European Metal Recycling, Kingsbury, March 2006	
D1666	47081	47606	47842	47606	47778	BR	ODIN; Irresistible	Cut by European Metal Recycling, Kingsbury, March 2006	Category:British Rail Class 47 D1666 (TOPS 47081, 47606, 47842, 47778) on Wikimedia Commons
D1667	47082	47626	47750			BR	ATLAS; Royal Mail Cheltenham; Atlas	Cut by European Metal Recycling, Kingsbury, May 2008	Category:British Rail Class 47 D1667 (TOPS 47082, 47626, 47750) on Wikimedia Commons
D1668	47083	47633				BR	Orion	Cut by MC Metals, Glasgow, June 1994	
D1669	~~47084~~	47538	968035	47538		BR	Python	Cut by MRJ Phillips, Crewe Works, March 1997	
D1670	47085					BR	MAMMOTH; Conidae; REPTA 1893-1993	Cut by EWS, Wigan CRDC, January 2000	
D1671						BR	Thor	Cut by R&S Hayes, Bridgend, September 1966	Category:British Rail Class 47 D1671 on Wikimedia Commons
D1672	47086	47641	47767			BR	Colossus; Fife Region; Saint Columba	Cut by CF Booth, Rotherham, July 2009	Category:British Rail Class 47 D1672 (TOPS 47086, 47641, 47767) on Wikimedia Commons
D1673	47087	47624				BR	CYCLOPS; Saint Andrew	Cut by CF Booth, Rotherham, September 2006	
D1674	47088	47653	47808	47653	47781	BR	Samson; Isle of Iona	Cut by European Metal Recycling, Kingsbury, April 2007	
D1675	47089					BR	Amazon	Cut by Coopers Metals, Sheffield, March 1989	Category:British Rail Class 47 D1675 (TOPS 47089) on Wikimedia Commons
D1676	47090	47623	47843			BR	VULCAN	Harry Needle Railroad Company	
D1677	47091	47647	47846	57308		BR	THOR; Tin Tin; Jamie Ferguson	Direct Rail Services	
D1678	~~47092~~	47534				BR		Cut by MRJ Phillips, Crewe Works, June 1995	
D1679	47093					BR		Cut by MC Metals, Glasgow, June 1990	
D1680	47094					BR		Cut by MC Metals, Glasgow, December 1994	
D1681	47095					BR	Southampton WRD	Cut by Harry Needle Railroad Company, Carnforth, December 2004	
D1682	47096					Brush	Rook	Cut by CF Booth, Rotherham, January 2000	
D1683	47485					Brush		Cut by MRJ Phillips, Crewe Works, January 2000	Category:British Rail Class 47 D1683 (TOPS 47485) on Wikimedia Commons
D1684	47097					Brush	Sir Peter White; Falcon	Cut by CF Booth, Rotherham, April 1992	
D1685	47098					Brush	Oriole	Cut by Gwent Demolition, Eastleigh yard, September 1993	
D1686	47099					Brush		Cut by CF Booth, Rotherham, April 1994	
D1687	47100					Brush	Merlin	Cut by CF Booth, Rotherham, February 1994	
D1688	47101					Brush		Cut by CF Booth, Rotherham, January 1994	Category:British Rail Class 47 D1688 (TOPS 47101) on Wikimedia Commons
D1689	47486					Brush		Cut by Vic Berry, Leicester, May 1989	
D1690	47102					Brush	Buzzard	Cut by CF Booth, Rotherham, August 1998	
D1691	47103					Brush		Cut by Vic Berry, Leicester, March 1989	
D1692	47104					Brush		Cut by MC Metals, Glasgow, June 1990	
D1693	47105	D1693				Brush	Goldcrest	Preserved by Brush Type 4 Fund at Gloucestershire Warwickshire Railway	
D1694	47106					Brush		Cut by Vic Berry, Leicester, June 1989	
D1695	47107					Brush		Cut by Coopers Metals, Sheffield, March 1994	Category:British Rail Class 47 D1695 (TOPS 47107) on Wikimedia Commons
D1696	47108					Brush	Golden Eagle	Cut by MRJ Phillips, Old Oak Common TMD, May 1997	
D1697	47109					Brush		Cut by MC Metals, Glasgow, November 1989	Category:British Rail Class 47 D1697 (TOPS 47109) on Wikimedia Commons
D1698	47110					Brush		Cut by Gwent Demolition, Thornaby, September 1993	
D1699	47111					Brush		Cut by British Rail, Cardiff Canton TMD, March 1987	
D1700	47112					Brush		Cut by MRJ Phillips, Old Oak Common TMD, May 1997	
D1701	47113					Brush		Cut by Vic Berry, Leicester, February 1990	
D1702	47114					Brush	Freightliner Bulk	Cut by CF Booth, Rotherham, March 2005	Category:British Rail Class 47 D1702 (TOPS 47114) on Wikimedia Commons
D1703	47115					Brush		Cut by MRJ Phillips, Frodingham, December 1995	
D1704	47116					Brush	Gannet	Cut by CF Booth, Rotherham, June 1994	
D1705	47117	~~89405~~	D1705			Brush	Sparrowhawk	Preserved by Type One Locomotive Company at Great Central Railway	Category:British Rail Class 47 D1705 (TOPS 47117) on Wikimedia Commons
D1706	47118					Brush	Lapwing	Cut by MRJ Phillips, Doncaster TMD, April 1995	
D1707	47487					Brush	VP Menon	Cut by MC Metals, Glasgow, June 1989	
D1708	47119					Brush	Arcidae	Cut by MRJ Phillips, Frodingham, December 1995	
D1709	47120					Brush	Osprey; RAF Kinloss	Cut by CF Booth, Rotherham, April 1994	
D1710	47121					Brush	Pochard	Cut by MRJ Phillips, Old Oak Common TMD, April 1997	Category:British Rail Class 47 D1710 (TOPS 47121) on Wikimedia Commons
D1711	47122					Brush		Cut by MC Metals, Glasgow, September 1989	
D1712	47123					Brush	Jay	Cut by Coopers Metals, Sheffield, April 1994	
D1713	47488					Brush	Rail Riders; Davies The Ocean	Nemesis Rail	Category:British Rail Class 47 D1713 (TOPS 47488) on Wikimedia Commons
D1714	47124					Brush	City of Cardiff	Cut by MC Metals, Glasgow, October 1990	
D1715	47125	~~47548~~	~~47666~~			Brush	Tonnidae	Cut by Harry Needle Railroad Company, Kingsbury, May 2002	Category:British Rail Class 47 D1715 (TOPS 47125) on Wikimedia Commons
D1716	47489					Brush	Crewe Diesel Depot	Cut by CF Booth, Rotherham, March 2010	
D1717	47126	47555				Brush	The Commonwealth Spirit	Cut by EWS, Wigan CRDC, April 2000	Category:British Rail Class 47 D1717 (TOPS 47126, 47555) on Wikimedia Commons
D1718	~~47127~~	47539				Brush	Rochdale Pioneers (Note: 47539 was named Rochdale Pioneers on 4 November 1982.)	Cut by Harry Needle Railroad Company, Kingsbury, February 2002	
D1719	47128	47656	47811			Brush		Locomotive Services Limited	Category:British Rail Class 47 D1719 (TOPS 47128, 47656, 47811) on Wikimedia Commons
D1720	47129	47658	47813			Brush	SS Great Britain; John Peel	West Coast Railways	Category:British Rail Class 47 D1720 (TOPS 47129, 47658, 47813) on Wikimedia Commons
D1721	47130					Brush		Cut by MC Metals, Glasgow, October 1990	
D1722	47131					Brush		Cut by Vic Berry, Leicester, May 1988	
D1723	~~47132~~	47540	47975	47540		Brush	The Institution of Civil Engineers	Cut by T.J.Thomson, Stockton, April 2016	Category:British Rail Class 47 D1723 (TOPS 47540, 47975) on Wikimedia Commons
D1724	~~47133~~	47549				Brush	Royal Mail	Cut by MRJ Phillips, Crewe Works, July 1995	
D1725	47490	47768				Brush	Bristol Bath Road; Resonant	Stored at Carnforth	Category:British Rail Class 47 D1725 (TOPS 47490, 47768) on Wikimedia Commons
D1726	47134	47622	47841			Brush	The Institution of Mechanical Engineers; Spirit of Chester	Locomotive Services Limited	Category:British Rail Class 47 D1726 (TOPS 47134, 47622, 47841) on Wikimedia Commons
D1727	47135	47664	47819	47784		Brush	Condover Hall	Cut by Ron Hull, Rotherham, December 2007	Category:British Rail Class 47 D1727 (TOPS 47135, 47664, 47819, 47784) on Wikimedia Commons
D1728	47136	47621	47839			Brush	Royal County of Berkshire; Pride of Saltley; PEGASUS	Cut by Raxstar, Eastleigh Works, August 2013	Category:British Rail Class 47 D1728 (TOPS 47136, 47621, 47839) on Wikimedia Commons
D1729	47137					Brush		Cut by MC Metals, Glasgow, December 1991	
D1730	47138	47607	47821	47786		Brush	Royal Worcester; Roy Castle OBE	West Coast Railways	Category:British Rail Class 47 D1730 (TOPS 47138, 47607, 47821, 47786) on Wikimedia Commons
D1731	~~47139~~	47550				Brush	University of Dundee	Cut by European Metal Recycling, Kingsbury, March 2010	
D1732	47140					Brush		Cut by Vic Berry, Leicester, June 1989	
D1733	47141	47614	47853			Brush	Rail Express	Locomotive Services Limited	Category:British Rail Class 47 D1733 (TOPS 47141, 47614, 47853) on Wikimedia Commons
D1734						Brush		Cut by British Rail, Crewe Works, April 1965	
D1735	47142					Brush	The Sapper; Traction	Cut by Vic Berry, Leicester, September 1999	Category:British Rail Class 47 D1735 (TOPS 47142) on Wikimedia Commons
D1736	47143					Brush		Cut by D Higgs, Doncaster TMD, June 1994	
D1737	47144					Brush		Cut by CF Booth, Rotherham, July 1998	
D1738	47145					Brush	MERDDIN EMRYS; Jostinot; Merddinn Emrys	Cut by T.J.Thomson, Stockton, August 2009	Category:British Rail Class 47 D1738 (TOPS 47145) on Wikimedia Commons
D1739	47146					Brush	Loughborough Grammar School; Paridae	Cut by CF Booth, Rotherham, May 2006	Category:British Rail Class 47 D1739 (TOPS 47146) on Wikimedia Commons
D1740	47147					Brush		Cut by Vic Berry, Leicester, March 1999	Category:British Rail Class 47 D1740 (TOPS 47147) on Wikimedia Commons
D1741	47148					Brush		Cut by MC Metals, Glasgow, September 1989	Category:British Rail Class 47 D1741 (TOPS 47148) on Wikimedia Commons
D1742	47149	47617	47677			Brush	University of Stirling	Cut by CF Booth, Rotherham, February 1998	
D1743	47150	47399	47150			Brush		Cut by T.J.Thomson, Stockton, October 2010	
D1744	47151	47648	47850			Brush		Cut by MRJ Phillips, Crewe Works, July 1997	Category:British Rail Class 47 D1744 (TOPS 47151, 47648, 47850) on Wikimedia Commons
D1745	47152	47398	47152			Brush		Cut by Southampton Steel, Southampton Maritime, August 2003	
D1746	47153	47551	47801	47551	47774	Brush	Post Restante	Cut by ?, Crewe DMD, March 2006	Category:British Rail Class 47 D1746 (TOPS 47153, 47551, 47774, 47801) on Wikimedia Commons
D1747	~~47154~~	47546	47976			Brush	Aviemore Centre	Cut by EWS, Wigan CRDC, April 2000	Category:British Rail Class 47 D1747 (TOPS 47546, 47976) on Wikimedia Commons
D1748	47155	47660	47815	D1748		Brush	Abertawe / Swansea; Great Western	West Coast Railways	Category:British Rail Class 47 D1748 (TOPS 47155, 47660, 47815) on Wikimedia Commons
D1749	47156					Brush		Cut by CF Booth, Rotherham, March 2005	
D1750	47157					Brush	Johnson Stevens Agencies	Cut by CF Booth, Rotherham, December 2004	
D1751	47158	47634				Brush	Henry Ford; Holbeck	Cut by Harry Needle Railroad Company, Kingsbury, October 2004	Category:British Rail Class 47 D1751 (TOPS 47158, 47634) on Wikimedia Commons
D1752	47159					Brush		Cut by Gwent Demolition, Thornaby, September 1993	
D1753	47491	47769				Brush	Horwich Enterprise; Resolve	Cut by EMR Kingsbury, July 2023	Category:British Rail Class 47 D1753 (TOPS 47491, 47769) on Wikimedia Commons
D1754	47160	47605	47746			Brush	The Bobby	West Coast Railways	Category:British Rail Class 47 D1754 (TOPS 47160, 47605, 47746) on Wikimedia Commons
D1755	~~47161~~	47541	47773			Brush	The Queen Mother (Note: 47541 was named The Queen Mother by the Queen Mother, herself, at Aberdeen station on 20 October 1982.); Reservist	Vintage Trains	Category:British Rail Class 47 D1755 (TOPS 47541, 47773) on Wikimedia Commons
D1756	47162					Brush		Cut by BREL, Crewe Works, May 1987	
D1757	47163	47610	47823	47787		Brush	Victim Support; Windsor Castle	West Coast Railways	Category:British Rail Class 47 D1757 (TOPS 47163, 47610, 47823, 47787) on Wikimedia Commons
D1758	47164	47571	47822	57305		Brush	Pride of Shrewsbury; John Tracy; Northern Princess	Rail Operations Group	
D1759	47165	47590	47825	57601		Brush	Thomas Telford; Sheila	West Coast Railways	Category:British Rail Class 47 D1759 (TOPS 47165, 47590, 47825) on Wikimedia Commons Category:British Rail Class 57 57601 on Wikimedia Commons
D1760	47492					Brush	The Enterprising Scot	Stored at Carnforth	
D1761	47166	47611	47837			Brush	Thames	Cut by CF Booth, Rotherham, March 1993	Category:British Rail Class 47 D1761 (TOPS 47166, 47611, 47837) on Wikimedia Commons
D1762	47167	47580	47732	47580		Brush	County of Essex; Restormel; Golden Jubilee	Preserved by Stratford 47 Group at Burton upon Trent	Category:British Rail Class 47 D1762 (TOPS 47167, 47580, 47732) on Wikimedia Commons
D1763	47168	47572				Brush	Ely Cathedral	Cut by EWS, Wigan CRDC, January 2000	
D1764	47169	47581	47763			Brush	Great Eastern	Cut by Sandbach Car & Commercial Dismantlers, Motherwell TMD, September 2003	Category:British Rail Class 47 D1764 (TOPS 47169, 47581, 47763) on Wikimedia Commons
D1765	47170	47582	47733			Brush	County of Norfolk; Eastern Star	Cut by European Metal Recycling, Kingsbury, May 2008	Category:British Rail Class 47 D1765 (TOPS 47170, 47582, 47733) on Wikimedia Commons
D1766	47171	47592	47738			Brush	County of Avon; Bristol Barton Hill	Cut by S Norton, Liverpool, March 2003	Category:British Rail Class 47 D1766 (TOPS 47171, 47592, 47738) on Wikimedia Commons
D1767	47172	47583	47734			Brush	County of Hertfordshire; Crewe Diesel Depot Quality Approved	Cut by European Metal Recycling, Kingsbury, May 2008	
D1768	47173	47573	47762			Brush	The LONDON STANDARD	Cut by CF Booth, Rotherham, October 2005	Category:British Rail Class 47 D1768 (TOPS 47173, 47573, 47762) on Wikimedia Commons
D1769	47174	47574				Brush	Lloyds List 250th Anniversary; Benjamin Gimbert G.C.	Cut by Ron Hull, Rotherham, May 2005	
D1770	47175	47575				Brush	City of Hereford	Cut by CF Booth, Rotherham, May 2010	Category:British Rail Class 47 D1770 (TOPS 47175, 47575) on Wikimedia Commons
D1771	47176	47576				Brush	King's Lynn	Cut by CF Booth, Rotherham, November 2005	Category:British Rail Class 47 D1771 (TOPS 47176, 47576) on Wikimedia Commons
D1772	47177	47599	47743			Brush		Cut by British Rail, Skelton Junction, York, October 1995	
D1773	47178	47588	47737			Brush	Carlisle Currock; Resurgent	Cut by European Metal Recycling, Kingsbury, August 2008	Category:British Rail Class 47 D1773 (TOPS 47178, 47588, 47737) on Wikimedia Commons
D1774	47179	47577	47847			Brush	Benjamin Gimbert G.C. (Note: 47577 was named Benjamin Gimbert G.C. at March railway station on 28 September 1981 by Clement Freud MP.); Brian Morrison / Railway World Magazine	Harry Needle Railroad Company	Category:British Rail Class 47 D1774 (TOPS 47179, 47577, 47847) on Wikimedia Commons
D1775	47180	47584				Brush	County of Suffolk; The Locomotive and Carriage Institution 1911	Cut by CF Booth, Rotherham, October 2002	Category:British Rail Class 47 D1775 (TOPS 47180, 47584) on Wikimedia Commons
D1776	47181	47578	47776			Brush	The Royal Society of Edinburgh; Respected; Sir Michael Dunford	West Coast Railways	
D1777	47182	47598	47742			Brush	The Enterprising Scot	Cut by European Metal Recycling, Kingsbury, May 2007	Category:British Rail Class 47 D1777 (TOPS 47182, 47598, 47742) on Wikimedia Commons
D1778	47183	47579	~~47757~~	47793	47579	Brush	James Nightall G.C. (Note: 47579 was named James Nightall G.C. at March railway station on 28 September 1981 by Clement Freud MP.); Saint Augustine	Preserved by Mangapps Railway Museum at Mid-Hants Railway	Category:British Rail Class 47 D1778 (TOPS 47183, 47579, 47793) on Wikimedia Commons
D1779	47184	47585	47757			Brush	County of Cambridgeshire'; Restitution	Cut by T.J.Thomson, Stockton, March 2006	
D1780	47185	47602	47824	47782		Brush	Glorious Devon	Cut by T.J.Thomson, Stockton, April 2007	
D1781	47186					Brush	Tinsley TMD Silver Jubilee 1965-1990; Catcliffe Demon	Cut by European Metal Recycling, Kingsbury, December 2007	
D1782	47301					Brush	Freightliner Birmingham; Centurion	Cut by Garrett, Basford Hall, January 2003	
D1783	47302					Brush	Meridian	Cut by T.J.Thomson, Stockton, August 2007	
D1784	47303	47397	47303			Brush	Freightliner Cleveland	Cut by T.J.Thomson, Stockton, December 2007	Category:British Rail Class 47 D1784 (TOPS 47303, 47397) on Wikimedia Commons
D1785	47304	47392	47304			Brush	Cory Brothers 1842-1992	Cut by EWS, Wigan CRDC, May 2000	
D1786	47305					Brush		Cut by Garrett, Basford Hall, March 2003	
D1787	47306					Brush	The Sapper; Goshawk	Preserved at Bodmin and Wenford Railway	Category:British Rail Class 47 D1787 (TOPS 47306) on Wikimedia Commons
D1788	47307					Brush	Bunting	Cut by European Metal Recycling, Kingsbury, May 2008	
D1789	47308					Brush		Cut by Sims Metals, Beeston, March 2004	
D1790	47309	47389	47309			Brush	Kittiwake; The Halewood Transmission; European Freight Operator of the Year: ISW Freight Industry Awards 1998	Cut by T.J.Thomson, Stockton, February 2009	
D1791	47310					Brush	Raven; Henry Ford	Cut by CF Booth, Rotherham, April 2004	
D1792	47311					Brush	Warrington Yard	Cut by CF Booth, Rotherham, February 1993	Category:British Rail Class 47 D1792 (TOPS 47311) on Wikimedia Commons
D1793	47312					Brush	Parsec of Europe	Cut by EWS, Wigan CRDC, April 2003	Category:British Rail Class 47 D1793 (TOPS 47312) on Wikimedia Commons
D1794	47313					Brush	Curlew	Cut by European Metal Recycling, Kingsbury, November 2007	Category:British Rail Class 47 D1794 (TOPS 47313) on Wikimedia Commons
D1795	47314	47387	47314			Brush	Blackcap; Transmark	Cut by European Metal Recycling, Kingsbury, April 2008	
D1796	47315					Brush	Templecombe	Cut by EWS, Wigan CRDC, May 2000	
D1797	47316					Brush	Wren; Cam Peak	Cut by T.J.Thomson, Stockton, April 2008	Category:British Rail Class 47 D1797 (TOPS 47316) on Wikimedia Commons
D1798	47317	57003				Brush	Willesden Yard; Freightliner Evolution	Direct Rail Services	Category:British Rail Class 47 D1798 (TOPS 47317) on Wikimedia Commons Category:British Rail Class 57 57003 on Wikimedia Commons
D1799	47318					Brush		Cut by T.J.Thomson, Stockton, April 2008	Category:British Rail Class 47 D1799 (TOPS 47318) on Wikimedia Commons
D1800	47319					Brush	Norsk Hydro	Cut by Raxstar, Immingham, May 2000	
D1801	47320					Brush	Crusader	Cut by MRJ Phillips, Crewe Works, November 1996	
D1802	47321					Brush		Cut by CF Booth, Rotherham, July 1998	
D1803	47322	57002				Brush	Desert Orchid; Freightliner Phoenix; Rail Express	Direct Rail Services	
D1804	47323					Brush	The Jostinot; Rover Group	Cut by Garrett, Basford Hall, July 2003	Category:British Rail Class 47 D1804 (TOPS 47323) on Wikimedia Commons
D1805	47324					Brush	Glossidae	Cut by CF Booth, Rotherham, January 1994	Category:British Rail Class 47 D1805 (TOPS 47324) on Wikimedia Commons
D1806	47325					Brush	Red Rum	Cut by CF Booth, Rotherham, May 1998	
D1807	47326					Brush	Saltley Depot; Saltley Depot Quality Approved	Cut by Ron Hull, Rotherham, October 2006	
D1808	47327					Brush		Cut by CF Booth, Rotherham, November 1993	
D1809	47328	47396	47328			Brush		Cut by CF Booth, Rotherham, September 2005	Category:British Rail Class 47 D1809 (TOPS 47328, 47396) on Wikimedia Commons
D1810	47329	57011				Brush	Freightliner Challenger	Direct Rail Services	Category:British Rail Class 47 D1810 (TOPS 47329) on Wikimedia Commons Category:British Rail Class 57 57011 on Wikimedia Commons
D1811	47330	47390	47330	57312		Brush	Amwlch Trader / Tren Nwyddau Amwlch; The Hood; Peter Henderson; Solway Princess	Direct Rail Services	Category:British Rail Class 47 D1811 (TOPS 47330, 47390) on Wikimedia Commons Category:British Rail Class 57 57312 on Wikimedia Commons
D1812	47331					Brush		Cut by CF Booth, Rotherham, September 2005	Category:British Rail Class 47 D1812 (TOPS 47331) on Wikimedia Commons
D1813	47332	57007				Brush	Freightliner Bond; John Scott 12.5.45 - 22.5.12	Direct Rail Services	Category:British Rail Class 47 D1813 (TOPS 47332) on Wikimedia Commons Category:British Rail Class 57 57007 on Wikimedia Commons
D1814	47333					Brush	Civil Link	Cut by CF Booth, Rotherham, June 1998	
D1815	47334					Brush	P&O Nedlloyd	Cut by CF Booth, Rotherham, January 2005	Category:British Rail Class 47 D1815 (TOPS 47334) on Wikimedia Commons
D1816	47335					Brush		Cut by European Metal Recycling, Kingsbury, June 2007	
D1817	47336					Brush		Cut by CF Booth, Rotherham, November 1993	
D1818	47337	57602				Brush	Taliesin; Herbert Austin; Restormel Castle	First Great Western	
D1819	47338					Brush	Cormorant; Warrington Yard	Cut by CF Booth, Rotherham, July 2007	
D1820	47339					Brush		Cut by CF Booth, Rotherham, February 2005	Category:British Rail Class 47 D1820 (TOPS 47339) on Wikimedia Commons
D1821	47340					Brush		Cut by MRJ Phillips, Crewe Works, March 1998	Category:British Rail Class 47 D1821 (TOPS 47340) on Wikimedia Commons
D1822	47341					Brush		Cut by Harry Needle Railroad Company, Toton TMD, February 2003	
D1823	47342					Brush		Cut by MC Metals, Glasgow, March 1992	
D1824	47343					Brush		Cut by MC Metals, Glasgow, November 1992	
D1825	47344					Brush	Chieftain; HUGGY BEAR	Cut by Harry Needle Railroad Company, Kingsbury, February 2002	
D1826	47345					Brush	Scimitar	Cut by Ron Hull, Rotherham, February 2007	
D1827	47346					Brush		Cut by Ron Hull, Rotherham, February 1998	Category:British Rail Class 47 D1827 (TOPS 47346) on Wikimedia Commons
D1828	47347	57004				Brush	Freightliner Quality	Direct Rail Services	
D1829	47348					Brush	St Christopher's Railway Home	Cut by Ron Hull, Rotherham, February 1998	Category:British Rail Class 47 D1829 (TOPS 47348) on Wikimedia Commons
D1830	47349	57603				Brush	Tintagel Castle	First Great Western	Category:British Rail Class 47 D1830 (TOPS 47349) on Wikimedia Commons Category:British Rail Class 57 57603 Tintagel Castle on Wikimedia Commons
D1831	47350	57005				Brush	British Petroleum; Scorpion; Freightliner Excellence	West Coast Railways	
D1832	47351					Brush	Madoqua	Cut by EWS, Wigan CRDC, February 2001	
D1833	47352					Brush	Tynwald	Cut by Raxstar, Frodingham, May 2000	
D1834	47353					Brush	Eland	Cut by CF Booth, Rotherham, February 2005	
D1835	47354					Brush		Cut by Garrett, Basford Hall, April 2003	
D1836	47355	47391	47355			Brush	Avocet	Stored at Carnforth	Category:British Rail Class 47 D1836 (TOPS 47355, 47391) on Wikimedia Commons
D1837	47187	57006				Brush	Freightliner Reliance	West Coast Railways	
D1838	47188					Brush		Cut by ?, Crewe DMD, September 2005	
D1839	47189					Brush		Cut by MC Metals, Glasgow, March 1992	
D1840	47190					Brush	Pectinidae	Cut by CF Booth, Rotherham, April 1998	
D1841	47191					Brush		Cut by Gwent Demolition, Wigan Springs Branch TMD, September 1993	Category:British Rail Class 47 D1841 (TOPS 47191) on Wikimedia Commons
D1842	47192	~~89442~~	D1842			BR		Preserved at Crewe Heritage Centre	Category:British Rail Class 47 D1842 (TOPS 47192) on Wikimedia Commons
D1843	47193					BR	Lucinidae	Cut by CF Booth, Rotherham, December 2004	
D1844	47194					BR	Bullidae; Carlisle Currock	Stored at Carnforth	Category:British Rail Class 47 D1844 (TOPS 47194) on Wikimedia Commons
D1845	47195					BR	Muricidae	Cut by Coopers Metals, Sheffield, March 1994	Category:British Rail Class 47 D1845 (TOPS 47195) on Wikimedia Commons
D1846	47196					BR	Haliotidae	Cut by Coopers Metals, Sheffield, March 1994	
D1847	47197					BR		Cut by T.J.Thomson, Stockton, January 2008	
D1848	47198					BR		Cut by Coopers Metals, Cardiff Canton TMD, July 1994	
D1849	47199					BR		Cut by MC Metals, Glasgow, December 1993	
D1850	47200					BR	Jackdaw; Herbert Austin; The Fosse Way	Cut by T.J.Thomson, Stockton, May 2008	
D1851	47201					BR		Cut by European Metal Recycling, Kingsbury, July 2007	
D1852	47202					BR		Cut by Maize Metals, Bristol Bath Road TMD, September 1991	
D1853	47203					BR		Cut by Vic Berry, Leicester, April 1990	
D1854	47204	47388	47204	57012		BR	Freightliner Envoy	Direct Rail Services	
D1855	47205	47395	47205			BR		Preserved at Northampton & Lamport Railway	
D1856	47206	57605				BR	The Morris Dancer; Totnes Castle	First Great Western	
D1857	47207					BR	Bulmers of Hereford; The Felixstowe Partnership	Cut by CF Booth, Rotherham, January 2005	
D1858	47208					BR		Cut by British Rail, Dundee TMD, March 1980	
D1859	47209	47393	47209	57604		BR	Bittern; Herbert Austin; Pendennis Castle	First Great Western	
D1860	47210					BR	Blue Circle Cement	Cut by EWS, Wigan CRDC, August 2000	
D1861	47211	47394	47211			BR	Johnson Stevens Agencies	Cut by Raxstar, Eastleigh, June 2003	
D1862	47212					Brush		Cut by Garrett, Crewe LNWR, February 2004	
D1863	47213					Brush	Marchwood Military Port	Cut by Harry Needle Railroad Company, Crewe DMD, May 2005	Category:British Rail Class 47 D1863 (TOPS 47213) on Wikimedia Commons
D1864	47214					Brush	Tinsley Traction Depot; Distillers MG; Antaneus	Cut by CF Booth, Rotherham, July 1998	
D1865	47215					Brush		Cut by CF Booth, Rotherham, July 1998	Category:British Rail Class 47 D1865 (TOPS 47215) on Wikimedia Commons
D1866	47216	47299				Brush	Ariadne	Cut by EWS, Wigan CRDC, January 2000	
D1867	47217					Brush	Kingfisher	Cut by CF Booth, Rotherham, August 2005	
D1868	47218					Brush	Firecrest; United Transport Europe	Cut by Harry Needle Railroad Company, Kingsbury, February 2002	
D1869	47219					Brush	Sandpiper; Arnold Kunzler	Cut by European Metal Recycling, Kingsbury, July 2007	
D1870	47220					Brush	Rapier	Cut by Coopers Metals, Sheffield, April 1994	
D1871	47221					Brush		Cut by Harry Needle Railroad Company, Kingsbury, January 2002	
D1872	47222					Brush	Appleby-Frodingham	Cut by CF Booth, Rotherham, August 1998	Category:British Rail Class 47 D1872 (TOPS 47222) on Wikimedia Commons
D1873	47223					Brush	British Petroleum	Cut by CF Booth, Rotherham, February 2005	
D1874	47224					Brush	Alcidae	Cut by ?, Crewe LNWR, October 2007	
D1875	47356	57001				Brush	The Gurkha; Freightliner Pioneer	West Coast Railways	
D1876	47357					Brush	The Permanent Way Institution	Cut by EWS, Wigan CRDC, April 2001	
D1877	47358					Brush	Ivanhoe	Cut by T.J.Thomson, Stockton, March 2009	
D1878	47359					Brush		Cut by CF Booth, Rotherham, February 1998	
D1879	47360					Brush	Fulmar	Cut by European Metal Recycling, Kingsbury, December 2007	
D1880	47361					Brush	Wilton Endeavour (Note: 47361 was named Wilton Endeavour at ICI Wilton on 22 July 1983.)	Cut by Harry Needle Railroad Company, Kingsbury, September 2004	
D1881	47362					Brush	Saracen	Cut by EWS, Wigan CRDC, December 2000	
D1882	47363	47385	47363			Brush	Billingham Enterprise	Cut by CF Booth, Rotherham, March 2010	
D1883	47364	47981				Brush		Cut by EWS, Wigan CRDC, June 2000	Category:British Rail Class 47 D1883 (TOPS 47364, 47981) on Wikimedia Commons
D1884	47365					Brush	Diamond Jubilee	Cut by CF Booth, Rotherham, October 2007	Category:British Rail Class 47 D1884 (TOPS 47365) on Wikimedia Commons
D1885	47366					Brush	The Institution of Civil Engineers; Capital Radio's Help a London Child	Cut by EWS, Wigan CRDC, April 1999	
D1886	47367					Brush	Kenny Cockbird	Preserved by Stratford 47 Group at Mid-Norfolk Railway	Category:British Rail Class 47 D1886 (TOPS 47367) on Wikimedia Commons
D1887	47368					Brush	Neritidae	Stored at Carnforth	
D1888	47369					Brush		Cut by CF Booth, Rotherham, May 1998	Category:British Rail Class 47 D1888 (TOPS 47369) on Wikimedia Commons
D1889	47370					Brush	Thunderbird; Andrew A Hodgkinson	Cut by T.J.Thomson, Stockton, August 2009	
D1890	47371	57313				Brush	Stingray / Tracy Island	West Coast Railways	
D1891	47372	57314				Brush	Firefly	West Coast Railways	
D1892	47373					Brush		Cut by MC Metals, Glasgow, November 1994	
D1893	47374					Brush	Petrolea	Cut by CF Booth, Rotherham, September 1994	
D1894	47375	047-375				Brush	Tinsley Traction Depot (Quality Approved)	Nemesis Rail Exported to Hungary, October 2015, operated by CONTINENTAL Railway Solution	Category:British Rail Class 47 D1894 (TOPS 47355, EVN 92 70 0047 375-5) on Wikimedia Commons
D1895	47376					Brush	Skylark; Freightliner 1995	Preserved by Brush Type 4 Fund at Gloucestershire Warwickshire Railway	Category:British Rail Class 47 D1895 (TOPS 47376) on Wikimedia Commons
D1896	47377					Brush		Cut by Garrett Basford Hall, August 2003	Category:British Rail Class 47 D1896 (TOPS 47377) on Wikimedia Commons
D1897	47378	47386	47378			Brush		Cut by CF Booth, Rotherham, September 1998	
D1898	47379					Brush	Total Energy	Cut by EWS, Wigan CRDC, December 1999	
D1899	47380					Brush	Immingham	Cut by MC Metals, Glasgow, October 1994	
D1900	47381					Brush		Cut by MC Metals, Glasgow, November 1994	
D1901	47225	57307				Brush	Lady Penelope	Direct Rail Services	Category:British Rail Class 47 D1901 (TOPS 47225) on Wikimedia Commons Category:British Rail Class 57 57307 on Wikimedia Commons
D1902	47226	47384	47226			Brush	Seagull	Cut by CF Booth, Rotherham, April 2008	
D1903	47227					Brush	Saladin	Cut by CF Booth, Rotherham, April 2008	
D1904	47228					Brush	axial	Cut by Coopers Metals, Sheffield, March 1994	
D1905	47229					Brush	Springbok	Cut by European Metal Recycling, Kingsbury, July 2007	
D1906	47230					Brush		Cut by T.J.Thomson, Stockton, March 2007	
D1907	47231	57010				Brush	The Silcock Express; Freightliner Crusader	Direct Rail Services	
D1908						Brush		Cut by British Rail, Crewe Works, October 1969	
D1909	47232	47665	47820	47785		Brush	The Statesman; Fiona Castle	Preserved at Wensleydale Railway	Category:British Rail Class 47 D1909 (TOPS 47232, 47665, 47820, 47785) on Wikimedia Commons
D1910	47233					Brush	Strombidae	Cut by MRJ Phillips, Frodingham, December 1995	
D1911	47234	57315				Brush	Stingray; The Mole	West Coast Railways	
D1912	47235					Brush		Cut by Vic Berry, Leicester, April 1990	
D1913	47236					Brush	Rover Group Quality Assured	Cut by West Coast Railways, Carnforth, October 2019	
D1914	47237					Brush		West Coast Railways	Category:British Rail Class 47 D1914 (TOPS 47237) on Wikimedia Commons
D1915	47238					Brush	Bescot Yard	Cut by Harry Needle Railroad Company, Kingsbury, December 2001	
D1916	47239	47657	47812	D1916		Brush	Pride of Eastleigh	West Coast Railways	
D1917	47240	47663	47818			Brush	Strathclyde; Joe Strummer; Emily	Shunter at Eastleigh Works for Arlington Fleet Group	
D1918	47241					Brush	The Silcock Express; Halewood Silver Jubilee 1988	Cut by CF Booth, Rotherham, January 2006	
D1919	47242	47659	47814	57306		Brush	Totnes Castle; Jeff Tracy; Her Majesty's Railway Inspectorate 175	Direct Rail Services	Category:British Rail Class 47 D1919 (TOPS 47242, 47659, 47814) on Wikimedia Commons Category:British Rail Class 57 57306 on Wikimedia Commons
D1920	47243	47636	47777			Brush	Sir John de Graeme; Restored	Cut by Harry Needle Railroad Company, Toton TMD, August 2004	
D1921	47244	47640				Brush	University of Strathclyde	Nemesis Rail at Battlefield Railway	Category:British Rail Class 47 D1921 (TOPS 47244, 47640) on Wikimedia Commons
D1922	47245					Brush	1. Linnet; 2. The Institute of Export; 3. V.E. Day 75th Anniversary	West Coast Railways	Category:British Rail Class 47 D1922 (TOPS 47245) on Wikimedia Commons
D1923	47246	47644	47756			Brush	The Permanent Way Institution; Royal Mail Tyneside	Cut by Ron Hull, Rotherham, May 2006	
D1924	47247	47655	47810			Brush	Porterbrook; Captain Sensible; Peter Bath MBE 1927-2006; Crewe Diesel Depot	Locomotive Services Limited	Category:British Rail Class 47 D1924 (TOPS 47247, 47655, 47810) on Wikimedia Commons
D1925	47248	47616	47671	47789		Brush	Y Ddraig Goch / The Red Dragon; Lindisfarne	Cut by European Metal Recycling, Kingsbury, May 2007	Category:British Rail Class 47 D1925 (TOPS 47248, 47616, 47671, 47789) on Wikimedia Commons
D1926	47249					Brush	Seahawk	Cut by CF Booth, Rotherham, April 1998	
D1927	47250	47600	47744			Brush	Dewi Sant / Saint David; Saint Edwin; The Cornish Experience; Royal Mail Cheltenham	Nemesis Rail	
D1928	47251	47589	47827	57302		Brush	Virgil Tracy; Chad Varah	Direct Rail Services	
D1929	47252	47615	47747			Brush	Castell Caerffili / Caerphilly Castle; Res Publica; Graham Farish; Florence Nightingale	Cut by CF Booth, Rotherham, June 2013	Category:British Rail Class 47 D1929 (TOPS 47252, 47615, 47747) on Wikimedia Commons
D1930	~~47253~~	47530				Brush		Cut by EWS, Wigan CRDC, January 2001	Category:British Rail Class 47 D1930 (TOPS 47530) on Wikimedia Commons
D1931	47254	47651	47806	57309		Brush	Brains; Pride of Crewe	Direct Rail Services	
D1932	47493	47701				Brush	Saint Andrew; Waverley; Old Oak Common Traction and Rolling Stock Depot	Nemesis Rail	Category:British Rail Class 47 D1932 (TOPS 47493, 47701) on Wikimedia Commons
D1933	47255	47596				Brush	Aldeburgh Festival	Preserved by Stratford 47 Group at Mid-Norfolk Railway	
D1934	47256					Brush		Cut by Harry Needle Railroad Company, Doncaster TMD, February 2002	
D1935	47257	47650	47805			Brush	Bristol Bath Road; Pride of Toton; Talisman; Roger Hosking MA 1925 - 2013	Locomotive Services Limited	
D1936	47494	47706				Brush	Strathclyde	Cut by MRJ Phillips, Crewe Works, August 1995	Category:British Rail Class 47 D1936 (TOPS 47494, 47706) on Wikimedia Commons
D1937	47495	47704				Brush	Dunedin	Cut by Ron Hull, Rotherham, December 2006	
D1938	47258					Brush	Forth Ports Tilbury	Cut by CF Booth, Rotherham, February 2005	
D1939	47496	47710				Brush	Sir Walter Scott; Capital Radio Help a London Child; Lady Godiva	Cut by European Metal Recycling, Kingsbury, March 2007	Category:British Rail Class 47 D1939 (TOPS 47496, 47710) on Wikimedia Commons
D1940	47497	47717				Brush	Tayside Region	Cut by European Metal Recycling, Kingsbury, March 2007	Category:British Rail Class 47 D1940 (TOPS 47497, 47717) on Wikimedia Commons
D1941	47498	47711				Brush	William Wallace; Greyfriars Bobby; County of Hertfordshire	Cut by Harry Needle Railroad Company, Toton TMD, September 2004	Category:British Rail Class 47 D1941 (TOPS 47498, 47711) on Wikimedia Commons
D1942	47499	47709				Brush	The Lord Provost; Dionysos	Cut by Raxstar, Eastleigh Works, September 2012	Category:British Rail Class 47 D1942 (TOPS 47499, 47709) on Wikimedia Commons
D1943	47500	47770	47500			Brush	GREAT WESTERN; Reserved	Cut by West Coast Railways, Carnforth, October 2019	Category:British Rail Class 47 D1943 (TOPS 47500, 47770) on Wikimedia Commons
D1944	47501	D1944				Brush	Craftsman	Locomotive Services Limited	Category:British Rail Class 47 D1944 (TOPS 47501) on Wikimedia Commons
D1945	47502	47715				Brush	Haymarket; Poseidon	Harry Needle Railroad Company	
D1946	47503	47771				Brush	The Geordie; Heaton Traincare Depot	Preserved by Class 47 Preservation Project at Eastleigh Works	
D1947	47504	47702				Brush	Saint Cuthbert; County of Suffolk	Cut by Harry Needle Railroad Company, Toton TMD, January 2005	Category:British Rail Class 47 D1947 (TOPS 47504, 47702) on Wikimedia Commons
D1948	47505	47712				Brush	Prince Charles Edward; Lady Diana Spencer; Dick Whittington; ARTEMIS; Pride of Carlisle	Preserved by D05 Preservation at Crewe Heritage Centre	Category:British Rail Class 47 D1948 (TOPS 47505, 47712) on Wikimedia Commons
D1949	47506	47707				Brush	Holyrood	Cut by CF Booth, Rotherham, February 2010	Category:British Rail Class 47 D1949 (TOPS 47506, 47707) on Wikimedia Commons
D1950	~~47259~~	47552	47802			Brush	Pride of Cumbria	West Coast Railways	Category:British Rail Class 47 D1950 (TOPS 47552, 47802) on Wikimedia Commons
D1951	47507	47716				Brush	Duke of Edinburgh's Award	Cut by CF Booth, Rotherham, March 2010	Category:British Rail Class 47 D1951 (TOPS 47507, 47716) on Wikimedia Commons
D1952	47508					Brush	Great Britain; S.S. Great Britain	Cut by MRJ Phillips, Bristol Bath Road TMD, November 1995	
D1953	47509					Brush	Albion	Cut by MRJ Phillips, Bristol Bath Road TMD, November 1995	
D1954	47510	47713				Brush	Fair Rosamund; Tayside Region	Cut by Vic Berry, Leicester, April 1990	
D1955	47511	47714				Brush	Thames; Grampian Region	Wensleydale Railway	
D1956	47260	47553	47803			Brush	Woman's Guild	Cut by Ron Hull, Rotherham, February 2007	Category:British Rail Class 47 D1956 (TOPS 47260, 47553, 47803) on Wikimedia Commons
D1957	~~47261~~	47554	47705	57303		Brush	Lothian; Guy Fawkes; Alan Tracy; Pride of Carlisle	Direct Rail Services	Category:British Rail Class 47 D1957 (TOPS 47554, 47705) on Wikimedia Commons Category:British Rail Class 57 57303 on Wikimedia Commons
D1958	47512					Brush		Cut by CF Booth, Rotherham, April 1993	
D1959	47513					Brush	Severn	Cut by CF Booth, Rotherham, May 2004	
D1960	47514	47703				Brush	Saint Mungo; The Queen Mother; Hermes; Lewis Carroll	Harry Needle Railroad Company	Category:British Rail Class 47 D1960 (TOPS 47514, 47703) on Wikimedia Commons
D1961	47515					Brush	Night Mail	Cut by ?, Crewe DMD, May 2006	Category:British Rail Class 47 D1961 (TOPS 47515) on Wikimedia Commons
D1962	47262	47608	47833	47788		BR	Captain Peter Manisty RN	Cut by EWS, Wigan CRDC, October 2000	Category:British Rail Class 47 D1962 (TOPS 47262, 47608, 47833, 47788) on Wikimedia Commons
D1963	47263	47587	47736			BR	Ruskin College Oxford; Cambridge Traction & Rolling Stock Depot; Sir Michael Dunford	Cut by Ron Hull, Rotherham, November 2007	Category:British Rail Class 47 D1963 (TOPS 47263, 47587, 47736) on Wikimedia Commons
D1964	47264	47619	47829			BR		Cut by CF Booth, Rotherham, February 2013	
D1965	47265	47591	47804	47792	47804	BR	Saint Cuthbert; Robin Hood	West Coast Railways	Category:British Rail Class 47 D1965 (TOPS 47265, 47591, 47792, 47804) on Wikimedia Commons
D1966	47266	47629	47828			BR	Severn Valley Railway Kidderminster Bridgnorth Bewdley; Joe Strummer	D05 Preservation, operational at Carnforth	Category:British Rail Class 47 D1966 (TOPS 47266, 47629, 47828) on Wikimedia Commons
D1967	47267	47603	47745			BR	County of Somerset; Royal London Society for the Blind	Cut by Harry Needle Railroad Company, Toton TMD, August 2004	Category:British Rail Class 47 D1967 (TOPS 47267, 47603, 47745) on Wikimedia Commons
D1968	47516	47708				BR	Waverley; Templecombe	Cut by MRJ Phillips, Crewe Works, August 1995	
D1969	47268	47595	47675	47791		BR	Confederation of British Industry; Orient Express	Cut by CF Booth, Rotherham, May 2013	Category:British Rail Class 47 D1969 (TOPS 47268, 47595, 47675, 47791) on Wikimedia Commons
D1970	47269	47643				BR		Preserved at Bo'ness and Kinneil Railway	Category:British Rail Class 47 D1970 (TOPS 47269, 47643) on Wikimedia Commons
D1971	47270					BR	Southampton WRD; Swift; Cory Brothers 1842-1992	West Coast Railways	
D1972	47271	47604	47674	47854		BR	Women's Royal Voluntary Service; Diamond Jubilee	West Coast Railways	Category:British Rail Class 47 D1972 (TOPS 47271, 47604, 47674, 47854) on Wikimedia Commons
D1973	47272	47593	47673	47790	47593	BR	Galloway Princess; Dewi Saint / Saint David	Locomotive Services Limited	Category:British Rail Class 47 D1973 (TOPS 47272, 47593, 47673, 47790) on Wikimedia Commons
D1974	47273	47627				BR	City of Oxford; Quasimodo	Cut by EWS, Wigan CRDC, July 2000	
D1975	47517	47758				BR	Andrew Carnegie; Regency Rail Cruises	Cut by CF Booth, Rotherham, April 2008	
D1976	47274	47637	47826			BR	Springburn	West Coast Railways	Category:British Rail Class 47 D1976 (TOPS 47274, 47637, 47826) on Wikimedia Commons
D1977	47275					BR		Cut by CF Booth, Rotherham, March 1989	
D1978	47276					BR		Cut by EWS, Wigan CRDC, April 2001	
D1979	47277					BR		Cut by Raxstar, Immingham, April 2000	Category:British Rail Class 47 D1979 (TOPS 47277) on Wikimedia Commons
D1980	47278					BR	Vasidae	Cut by EWS, Wigan CRDC, December 1999	
D1981	47279					BR		Cut by T.J.Thomson, Stockton, August 2007	
D1982	47280					BR	Pedigree	Cut by European Metal Recycling, Kingsbury, December 2007	
D1983	47281					BR	Merddin Emrys	Cut by EWS, Wigan CRDC, August 2000	
D1984	47282					BR		Cut by CF Booth, Rotherham, March 1989	
D1985	47283					BR	Johnny Walker	Cut by Harry Needle Railroad Company, Kingsbury, September 2004	
D1986	47284					BR	Stormcock / Mistle Thrush	Cut by EWS, Wigan CRDC, November 1999	
D1987	47285					BR		Cut by Ron Hull, Rotherham, February 2005	
D1988	47286					BR	Port of Liverpool	Cut by EWS, Wigan CRDC, September 2000	
D1989	47287					BR		Cut by CF Booth, Rotherham, January 2005	
D1990	47288					BR	Powerbase	Cut by CF Booth, Rotherham, May 1996	
D1991	47289					BR		Cut by T.J.Thomson, Stockton, December 2010	
D1992	47290	57316				BR	FAB 1	West Coast Railways	
D1993	47291					BR	The Port of Felixstowe	Cut by CF Booth, Rotherham, June 2004	
D1994	47292					BR		Preserved at Churnet Valley Railway	Category:British Rail Class 47 D1994 (TOPS 47292) on Wikimedia Commons
D1995	47293					BR	TRANSFESA	Cut by European Metal Recycling, Kingsbury, July 2007	
D1996	47294					BR		Cut by Harry Needle Railroad Company, Toton TMD, December 2002	
D1997	47295					BR	Black Prince	Cut by European Metal Recycling, Kingsbury, July 2011	
D1998	47296					BR		Cut by Southampton Steel, Southampton Maritime, August 2003	
D1999	47297					BR	Cobra Railfreight	Cut by Harry Needle Railroad Company, Kingsbury, May 2002	

== See also ==
- BR Class 37 renumbering
