= List of British Rail Class 37 locomotives =

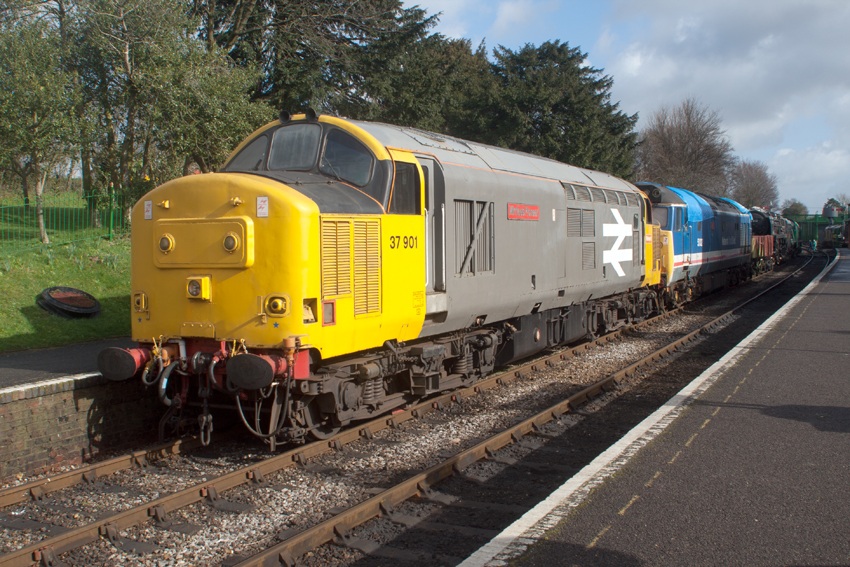
D6850 / 37150 / 37901

The 309 members of the class 37 underwent many changes in their long career on British railways. Under the TOPS system each change was reflected in a change of identity.

== List of locomotives ==
Legend
~~Strikethrough~~	Denotes TOPS numbers allocated, but never actually carried by the locomotive.		
The D prefix to British Transport Commission (BTC) numbers was generally dropped after August 1968.
Colour Key
In service	Stored	Scrapped	Preserved

Jump to
D66XX	D67XX	D68XX	D69XX

Numbers						Names	Status	Notes
BTC	TOPS			Post-TOPS		Names	Status	Notes
BTC	1st	2nd	3rd	1st	2nd	Names	Status	Notes
D6600	37300	37429				Eisteddfod Genedlaethol	Scrapped	By EMR, Kingsbury, February 2008
D6601	37301	37412				1) Loch Lomond; 2) Driver John Elliott	Scrapped	
D6602	37302	37416				1) Mt Fuji (Note: Unofficial name, often applied by depot staff.); 2) Sir Robert McAlpine / Concrete Bob	Scrapped	
D6603	37303	37271	37333				Scrapped	At Crewe Works, July 1997
D6604	37304	37272	37334				Scrapped	By CF Booth, Rotherham, August 2005
D6605	37305	37407				1) Loch Long; 2) Blackpool Tower	Stored	
D6606	37306	37273					Scrapped	By Gwent Demolition, Margam, May 1993
D6607	37307	37403				1) Glendarroch; 2) Ben Cruachan; 3) Isle of Mull	Preserved	Owned by Scottish Railway Preservation Society. Mainline registered, based at Bo'ness and Kinneil Railway
D6608	37308	37274					Preserved	At the Severn Valley Railway
D6700	37119	37350		D6700		National Railway Museum	Preserved	At the Great Central Railway
D6701	37001	37707					Scrapped	
D6702	37002	37351					Scrapped	By TJ Thomson, November 2007
D6703	37003					1) First East Anglian Regiment (Note: Name never carried in traffic.); 2) Tiger Moth; 3) Dereham Neatherd High School 1912-2012	Preserved	By the Class 37 Locomotive Group at Mid-Norfolk Railway
D6704	37004					Second East Anglian Regiment (Note: Names allocated but plates never fitted.)	Scrapped	By MC Metals, Glasgow, June 1996
D6705	37005	37501	37601			1) Third East Anglian Regiment; 2) Teesside Steelmaster; 3) Class 37 - Fifty; 4) Perseus	In service	Europhoenix (leased to Rail Operations Group)
D6706	37006	37798					Scrapped	By CF Booth, Rotherham, July 2009
D6707	37007	37506	37604			1) The East Anglian Regiment; 2) British Steel Skinningrove	Stored	HNRC
D6708	37008	37352				Hornet	Scrapped	At Crewe Works, July 1996
D6709	37009	37340					Preserved	By English Electric Preservation at Great Central Railway (Nottingham)
D6710	37010						Scrapped	By CF Booth, Rotherham, July 2007
D6711	37011						Scrapped	By J.Rollason, Wellington, August 1989, following accident damage
D6712	37012					1) Derwent; 2) Loch Rannoch	Scrapped	by Sims Metals Beeston in 2003
D6713	37013					Vampire	Scrapped	By Harry Needle Railroad Company at Kingsbury, February 2007
D6714	37014	37709					Scrapped	
D6715	37015	37341					Scrapped	By CF Booth, Rotherham, February 2003
D6716	37016	37706				Conidae	Preserved	Privately owned, at Epping Ongar Railway
D6717	37017	37503				British Steel Shelton	Preserved	By the Shires Removal Group
D6718	37018	37517					Stored	West Coast Railways
D6719	37019	~~37342~~					Scrapped	
D6720	37020	37702		L30		Taff Merthyr	Scrapped	
D6721	37021	37715				British Petroleum	Scrapped	By HNRC at Kingsbury, November 2005
D6722	37022	37512	37608			1) Thornaby Demon; 2) Andromeda	In service	Europhoenix (Leased to Rail Operations Group)
D6723	37023					1) Stratford; 2) Stratford TMD Quality Approved	Preserved	Privately owned, at the Pontypool & Blaenavon Railway
D6724	37024	37714		L031	L26		Preserved	By the Heavy Tractor Group at the Great Central Railway
D6725	37025					Inverness TMD Quality Approved	In service	The Scottish 37 Group (on hire to Colas Rail)
D6726	37026	37320				1) Shap Fell; 2) Loch Awe (Note: 37026 was named Loch Awe at Glasgow Queen Street on 6 October 1981.)	Scrapped	By EWS, Wigan, July 2000
D6727	37027	37519				1) Loch Eil (Note: 37027 was named Loch Eil at Glasgow Queen Street on 6 October 1981.); 2) Orion	Scrapped	By CF Booth, Rotherham, March 2008
D6728	37028	37505				British Steel Workington	Scrapped	By EMR, Kingsbury, February 2008
D6729	37029	D6729					Preserved	Privately owned, at Epping Ongar Railway
D6730	37030	37701					Scrapped	By EMR, Kingsbury, January 2008
D6731	37031						Scrapped	At Cardiff Canton, May 1997
D6732	37032	37353		D6732		Mirage	Preserved	Privately owned, at the North Norfolk Railway
D6733	37033	37719					Scrapped	By EMR, Kingsbury, January 2008
D6734	37034	37704					Scrapped	By TJ Thomson, June 2009
D6735	37035						Scrapped	By CF Booth, Rotherham, January 2000
D6736	37036	37507	37605			Hartlepool Pipe Mill	Scrapped	As spares for the Heavy Tractor Group
D6737	37037	37321				Gartcosh	Preserved	South Devon Railway
D6738	37038						Stored	Bought by HNRC August 2022
D6739	37039	37504	37603			British Steel Corby	Stored	HNRC
D6740	37040						Scrapped	By CF Booth, Rotherham, April 2006
D6741	37041	37520					Scrapped	By TJ Thomson, October 2007
D6742	37042						Preserved	Was at Eden Valley Railway
D6743	37043	37354				Loch Lomond (Note: 37043 was named Loch Lomond at Glasgow Queen Street on 6 October 1981.)	Scrapped	By Sims Metal, May 2003
D6744	37044	37710					Stored	West Coast Railways
D6745	37045	37355					Scrapped	By HNRC, November 2003
D6746	37046						Scrapped	By CF Booth, Rotherham, September 2009
D6747	37047						Scrapped	By EMR, Kingsbury, May 2008
D6748	37048						Scrapped	By HNRC, April 2003
D6749	37049	37322	37343			Imperial	Scrapped	By HNRC, December 2003
D6750	37050	37717				1) Stainless Pioneer; 2) Maltby Lilly Hall Junior School, Rotherham; Railsafe Trophy Winners 1996; 3) St Margaret's Church of England Primary School, City of Durham; Railsafe Trophy Winners 1997; 4) Berwick Middle School; Railsafe Trophy Winners 1998	Scrapped	By CF Booth, Rotherham, April 2009
D6751	37051					Merehead	Scrapped	By Sims Metal, January 2008
D6752	37052	37713					Scrapped	By HNRC, June 2007
D6753	37053	37344					Scrapped	By CF Booth, Rotherham, March 2006
D6754	37054						Scrapped	At Motherwell MPD, September 2003
D6755	37055					Rail Celebrity	Scrapped	By EMR, Kingsbury, April 2008
D6756	37056	37513					Scrapped	By CF Booth, Rotherham, February 2008
D6757	37057					Viking	In service	Colas Rail
D6758	37058						Scrapped	By CF Booth, Rotherham, April 2009
D6759	37059					Port of Tilbury	Stored	Worksop
D6760	37060	37705					Scrapped	By TJ Thomson, August 2007
D6761	37061	37799		L030	L27	Sir Dyfed / County of Dyfed	Scrapped	
D6762	37062						Scrapped	By Vic Berry, Leicester, April 1990
D6763	37063						Scrapped	By HNRC, December 2001
D6764	37064	37515					Scrapped	By TJ Thomson
D6765	37065						Scrapped	By EMR, Kingsbury, December 2007
D6766	37066					Valiant	Scrapped	At Crewe Works, August 1997
D6767	37067	37703		L023	L25		Preserved	At the Dartmouth Steam Railway
D6768	37068	37356				Grainflow	Scrapped	By CF Booth, Rotherham, August 2005
D6769	37069					Thornaby TMD	In service	Europhoenix
D6770	37070			025031			Scrapped	By HNRC, July 2004
D6771	37071						Scrapped	By CF Booth, Rotherham, October 2005
D6772	37072					Venom	Scrapped	By HNRC, October 2004
D6773	37073					1)Tornado; 2) Fort William / An Gearasdan	Scrapped	By Ian Riley Engineering, April 2003
D6774	37074						Scrapped	by CF Booth, Rotherham, November 2005
D6775	37075						Preserved	Privately owned, at the Keighley & Worth Valley Railway
D6776	37076	37518					In service	West Coast Railways
D6777	37077					Hurricane	Scrapped	By CF Booth, Rotherham
D6778	37078						Scrapped	By HNRC, February 2004
D6779	37079	37357				Medite	Scrapped	By EMR, Kingsbury, August 2008
D6780	37080						Scrapped	At Cardiff Canton, May 1997
D6781	37081	37797				Loch Long (Note: 37081 was named Loch Long at Glasgow Queen Street on 6 October 1981.)	Scrapped	By CF Booth, Rotherham, February 2006
D6782	37082	37502	37602			1) British Steel Teesside; 2) T.S. Eliot**	Stored	HNRC
D6783	37083						Scrapped	By Raxstar, April 2000
D6784	37084	37718		L021	L22	Hartlepool Pipe Mill	Stored	
D6785	37085	37711				Tremorfa Steel Works	Scrapped	By HNRC, March 2006
D6786	37086	37516					In service	West Coast Railways
D6787	37087					1) Vulcan; 2) Keighley & Worth Valley Railway	Scrapped	
D6788	37088	37323				Clydesdale	Scrapped	By CF Booth, Rotherham, October 2002
D6789	37089	37708					Scrapped	By CF Booth, Rotherham, March 2008
D6790	37090	37508	37606				In service	Steve Beniston
D6791	37091	37358				P&O Containers	Scrapped	By TJ Thomson, May 2007
D6792	37092						Scrapped	By TJ Thomson, October 2001
D6793	37093	37509					Scrapped	At Cardiff Canton, August 2005
D6794	37094	37716		L034	L23	British Steel Corby	In service	Direct Rail Services
D6795	37095						Scrapped	By HNRC, February 2005
D6796	37096					Spitfire	Scrapped	By MC Metals, Glasgow, September 1991
D6797	37097					Old Fettercairn	Preserved	By the Caledonian Railway Diesel Group at the Caledonian Railway
D6798	37098						Scrapped	By HNRC, May 2002
D6799	37099	37324				Clydebridge	In service	Colas Rail
D6800	37100	97301					Stored	Network Rail Stored at Peak Rail
D6801	37101	~~37345~~					Scrapped	By HNRC, August 2003
D6802	37102	37712				1) The Cardiff Rod Mill; 2) Teesside Steelmaster	Stored	West Coast Railways
D6803	37103	37511	37607			Stockton Haulage	In service	HNRC
D6804	37104						Scrapped	By Raxstar, April 2000
D6805	37105	37796					Scrapped	By CF Booth, Rotherham, February 2009
D6806	37106						Scrapped	By EWS, Wigan, August 2000
D6807	37107					Fury	Scrapped	By EWS, Wigan, December 1998
D6808	37108	37325				Lanarkshire Steel	Preserved	Privately owned, at Crewe Heritage Centre
D6809	37109						Preserved	Privately owned, at East Lancashire Railway
D6810	37110						Scrapped	By Raxstar, May 2000
D6811	37111	37326				Outward Bound School Loch Eit	Scrapped	By HNRC, July 2003
D6812	37112	37510					In service	Europhoenix (Leased to Rail Operations Group)
D6813	37113					Radio Highland	Scrapped	By MC Metals, Edinburgh, August 1995
D6814	37114					1) Dunrobin Castle; 2) City of Worcester	Scrapped	By EMR, Kingsbury, January 2008
D6815	37115	37514	37609				Stored	HNRC
D6816	37116					1) Comet; 2) Sister Dora	In service	Colas Rail
D6817	37117	37521				English China Clays	In service	Locomotive Services Limited
D6818	37118	37359					Scrapped	By HNRC, January 2005
D6819	37283	37895					Scrapped	
D6820	37120	37887				Castell Caerffilli / Caerphilly Castle	Scrapped	By CF Booth, Rotherham, April 2008
D6821	37121	37677					Scrapped	By CF Booth, Rotherham, October 2008
D6822	37122	37692				The Lass O` Ballochmyle	Scrapped	By CF Booth, Rotherham, July 2009
D6823	37123	37679					Preserved	Privately owned, at Burton Wagon Works
D6824	37124	37894					Scrapped	By EMR, Kingsbury, August 2008
D6825	37125	37904					Scrapped	By CF Booth, Rotherham, November 2004
D6826	37126	37676					In service	West Coast Railways
D6827	37127	37370					Scrapped	By CF Booth, September 2005
D6828	37128	37330					Scrapped	By TJ Thomson, November 2001
D6829	37129	37669					In service	West Coast Railways
D6830	37130	37681					Scrapped	At Crewe Works, August 1995
D6831	37131						Scrapped	By CF Booth, Rotherham, April 2007
D6832	37132	37673					Scrapped	By EMR, Kingsbury, May 2008
D6833	37133						Scrapped	By HNRC, November 2004
D6834	37134	37684				Peak National Park	Scrapped	By CF Booth, Rotherham
D6835	37135	37888		L024	L31	Petrolea	Scrapped	
D6836	37136	37905				1) Vulcan Enterprise; 2) Mirrlees Pioneer	Preserved	At the Watercress Line
D6837	37137	37312				Clyde Iron	Scrapped	By TJ Thomson, July 2006
D6838	37138			025032			Scrapped	By HNRC, July 2004
D6839	37139						Scrapped	By TJ Thomson, February 2004
D6840	37140						Scrapped	By EWS, July 2001
D6841	37141						Scrapped	By HNRC, February 2005
D6842	37142						Preserved	At Bodmin & Wenford Railway
D6843	37143	37800		L025	L33	1) Glo Cymru; 2) Cassiopeia	In service	Europhoenix (Leased to Rail Operations Group)
D6844	37144						Scrapped	By Sims Metal, October 2003
D6845	37145	37313	37382				Scrapped	By Raxstar, April 2000
D6846	37146						Stored	Europhoenix
D6847	37147	37371					Scrapped	By EWS, June 2001
D6848	37148	37902				British Steel Llanwern	Scrapped	By Sims Metal, April 2005
D6849	37149	37892				Ripple Lane	Scrapped	In January 2008
D6850	37150	37901				Mirrlees Pioneer	In service	Europhoenix
D6851	37151	37667				1) Wensleydale; 2) Meldon Quarry Centenary	In service	Locomotive Services Limited
D6852	37152	37310				British Steel Ravenscraig	Preserved	Private owner at Peak Rail
D6853	37153						Scrapped	By CF Booth, Rotherham, January 2003
D6854	37154					Sabre	Scrapped	By EWS, Wigan, July 2000
D6855	37155	37897					Scrapped	By EMR, Kingsbury, February 2008
D6856	37156	37311				British Steel Hunterstone	Scrapped	By EWS, Wigan, January 2000
D6857	37157	37695					Scrapped	By Ron Hull Jr, Rotherham, April 2008
D6858	37158						Scrapped	By HNRC, April 2008
D6859	37159	37372					Stored	Baby Deltic Project
D6860	37160	37373				Lightning	Scrapped	By MRJ Philips, July 1997
D6861	37161	37899		L022	L21	County of West Glamorgan / Sir Gorllewin Morgannwg	Scrapped	At Madrid, Spain, July 2003
D6862	37162						Scrapped	By CF Booth, Rotherham, December 2005
D6863	37163	37802		L32			Scrapped	In Spain, July 2003
D6864	37164	37675				1) William Cookworthy; 2) Margam TMD	Scrapped	By EMR, Kingsbury
D6865	37165	37374					Stored	West Coast Railways
D6866	37166	37891					Scrapped	By EMR, Attercliffe
D6867	37167	37383	37383				Scrapped	By HNRC, January 2008
D6868	37168	37890				The Railway Observer	Scrapped	By Ron Hull Jr, Rotherham
D6869	37169	37674				St Blaise Church 1445-1995	Preserved	Private owner
D6870	37170	97302				Ffestiniog & Welsh Highland Railways / Rheilffyrdd Ffestiniog ac Eryri	In service	Network Rail (Operated by Colas Rail)
D6871	37171	37690	37611			Pegasus	In service	Europhoenix (Leased to Rail Operations Group)
D6872	37172	37686					Scrapped	By CF Booth, Rotherham, April 2006
D6873	37173	37801		L032	L29	Aberthaw / Aberddawan	Scrapped	
D6874	37174						Scrapped	By EMR, Kingsbury, April 2008
D6875	37175						In service	Colas Rail
D6876	37176	37883		L28			Scrapped	
D6877	37177	37885		L033	L24		Scrapped	At Madrid, Spain, July 2003
D6878	37178	97303				Dave Berry	In service	Network Rail (Operated by Colas Rail)
D6879	37179	37691	37612				In service	HNRC
D6880	37180	37886				Sir Dyfed / County of Dyfed	Scrapped	
D6881	37181	37687	37610			1) The Malcolm Group; 2) TS Cassidy 14.5.61-6.4.08	In service	HNRC
D6882	37182	37670				St Blazey T&RS Depot	Scrapped	
D6883	37183	37884		L34		1) Gartcosh; 2) Cepheus	In service	Europhoenix (Leased to Rail Operations Group)
D6884	37184						Scrapped	By TJ Thomson, September 2001
D6885	37185					1) Buccaneer; 2) Lea & Perrins	Scrapped	By CF Booth, Rotherham, January 2006
D6886	37186	37898				Cwmbargoed DP	Scrapped	
D6887	37187	37683					Scrapped	
D6888	37188					Jimmy Shand	Scrapped	
D6889	37189	37672				Freight Transport Association	Scrapped	By TJ Thomson
D6890	37190	37314				Dalzell	Preserved	At One:One Collection, Margate
D6891	37191						Scrapped	By EWS, January 2001
D6892	37192	37694				The Lass O` Ballochmyle	Scrapped	
D6893	37193	37375					Scrapped	By EMR, Kingsbury, January 2008
D6894	37194					British International Freight Association	Scrapped	
D6895	37195	37689					Scrapped	By EMR, Attercliffe
D6896	37196						Scrapped	By CF Booth, Rotherham, May 2009
D6897	37197						Scrapped	
D6898	37198						Stored	Network Rail
D6899	37199	37376					Scrapped	By CF Booth, Rotherham, February 2006
D6900	37200	37377					Scrapped	By CF Booth, Rotherham, October 2009
D6901	37201					Saint Margaret	Scrapped	By CF Booth, Rotherham, March 2009
D6902	37202	37331					Scrapped	By HNRC, August 2003
D6903	37203						Scrapped	By Ron Hull Jr, Rotherham
D6904	37204	37378					Scrapped	By CF Booth, Rotherham, June 1996
D6905	37205	37688				1) Great Rocks; 2) Kingmoor TMD	Preserved	Owned by D05 Preservation Limited, on lease to Locomotive Services Limited
D6906	37206	37906				Star of the East	Preserved	Privately owned, at Battlefield Line Railway
D6907	37207					William Cookworthy	Preserved	At Barrow Hill
D6908	37208	37803					Scrapped	By EMR, Kingsbury, July 2007
D6909	37209					Phantom	Scrapped	By HNRC, July 2002
D6910	37210	37693				1) Sir William Arrol; 2) Saint Margaret	Scrapped	By EMR, Attercliffe
D6911	37211						Scrapped	By EMR, Kingsbury, July 2007
D6912	37212						Scrapped	By Raxstar, February 2004
D6913	37213						Scrapped	By TJ Thomson, May 2003
D6914	37214						Stored	Bo'ness and Kinneil Railway
D6915	37215			D6915			Preserved	By The Growler Group at Gloucestershire Warwickshire Railway
D6916	37216					Great Eastern	Preserved	Privately owned, at Pontypool & Blaenavon Railway
D6917	37217	97304				John Tiley	In service	Network Rail (Operated by Colas Rail)
D6918	37218						In service	Europhoenix
D6919	37219					Shirley Ann Smith	In service	Colas Rail
D6920	37220					Westerleigh	Scrapped	By EMR, Kingsbury, September 2007
D6921	37221						Scrapped	By CF Booth, Rotherham, May 2009
D6922	37222						Scrapped	By TJ Thomson, August 2008
D6923	37223						Scrapped	By Sims Metal, March 2003
D6924	37224	37680					Scrapped	By TJ Thomson
D6925	37225						Scrapped	By CF Booth, Rotherham, June 2004
D6926	37226	37379				1) Ipswich WRD; 2) Ipswich WRD Quality Assured	Scrapped	By CF Booth, Rotherham, January 2008
D6927	37227						Preserved	At the Chinnor & Princes Risborough Railway
D6928	37228	37696					Scrapped	
D6929	37229					1) The Cardiff Rod Mill; 2) Jonty Jarvis	Scrapped	
D6930	37230						Scrapped	By CF Booth, Rotherham, January 2006
D6931	37231	37896					Scrapped	By Ron Hull Jr, Rotherham
D6932	37232					Institution of Railway Signal Engineers	Scrapped	By EWS, March 2000
D6933	37233	37889					Scrapped	By HNRC, March 2007
D6934	37234	37685					In service	West Coast Railways
D6935	37235					Coal Merchants Association of Scotland	Scrapped	By HNRC, April 2008
D6936	37236	37682				Hartlepool Pipe Mill	Scrapped	By CF Booth, Rotherham, November 2016
D6937	37237	37893					Scrapped	
D6938	37238					Spitfire II	Scrapped	By CF Booth, Rotherham, March 2009
D6939	37239	37332				The Coal Merchants Association of Scotland	Scrapped	By HNRC, June 2000
D6940	37240					Golden Heart	Preserved	By Boden Rail Engineering
D6941	37241						Scrapped	By TJ Thomson, September 2001
D6942	37242						Scrapped	By CF Booth, Rotherham, February 2006
D6943	37243	37697					Scrapped	By CF Booth, Rotherham, March 2006
D6944	37244						Scrapped	By EWS, November 2000
D6945	37245						Scrapped	By EWS, September 2000
D6946	37246	37698				Coedbach	Scrapped	By CF Booth, Rotherham
D6947	37247	37671				Tre Pol & Pen	Scrapped	By EMR, Attercliffe
D6948	37248					1) Midland Railway Centre; 2) Loch Arkaig	Preserved	Privately owned, at Gloucestershire Warwickshire Railway
D6949	37249	37903					Scrapped	In October 2005
D6950	37250					Gladiator	Preserved	Privately owned, at the Wensleydale Railway
D6951	37251					The Northern Lights	Scrapped	By CF Booth, Rotherham, September 2001
D6952	37252						Scrapped	By HNRC, July 2002
D6953	37253	37699					Scrapped	At Crewe Works, July 1997
D6954	37254					1) Driver Robin Prince MBE; 2) Cardiff Canton	In service	Colas Rail
D6955	37255						Preserved	Private owner at Great Central Railway
D6956	37256	37678					Scrapped	By EMR, Kingsbury, June 2007
D6957	37257	37668				Leyburn	In service	West Coast Railways
D6958	37258	37384					Scrapped	By HNRC, November 2005
D6959	37259	37380					Stored	HNRC
D6960	37260					Radio Highland	Scrapped	By MC Metals, Glasgow, September 1991
D6961	37261					Caithness	Preserved	Privately owned, at the Bo'ness and Kinneil Railway
D6962	37262					Dounreay	Scrapped	By Sims Metal, February 2004
D6963	37263						Preserved	Privately owned, at the Telford Steam Railway
D6964	37264						Preserved	Privately owned, at the North Yorkshire Moors Railway
D6965	37265	37430				Cwmbrân	Scrapped	By EMR, Kingsbury, May 2008
D6966	37266	37422				1) Robert F. Fairlie Locomotive Engineer 1831-1885; 2) Cardiff Canton	Stored	Direct Rail Services
D6967	37267	37421				1) Strombidae; 2) The Kingsman	In service	Colas Rail
D6968	37268	37401				1) Mary Queen of Scots; 2) The Royal Scotsman	In Service	Locomotive Services Limited
D6969	37269	37417				1) Highland Region; 2) Rail; 3) Richard Trevithick	Scrapped	
D6970	37270	37409				1) Loch Awe; 2) Lord Hinton	Stored	Direct Rail Services
D6971	37271	37418				1) An Comunn Gaedhealach; 2) Pectinidae; 3) East Lancashire Railway	In service	Privately owned; on hire to Loram
D6972	37272	37431				1) Sir Powys / County of Powys; 2) Bullidae	Scrapped	By EWS, August 2000
D6973	37273	37410				Aluminium 100	Scrapped	By CF Booth, Rotherham, March 2013
D6974	37274	37402					In service	Andania Engineering
D6975	37275					1) Stainless Pioneer; 2) Oor Wullie	Preserved	At Dartmouth Steam Railway
D6976	37276	37413				1) Loch Eil Outward Bound; 2) The Scottish Railway Preservation Society	Scrapped	
D6977	37277	37415				Mt Etna	Scrapped	
D6978	37278						Scrapped	By TJ Thomson, May 2003
D6979	37279	37424	37558 (Note: Still 37424 under TOPS. 558 only applied to side of loco, front of loco still carries 424)			Isle of Mull; Avro Vulcan XH558	In service	Direct Rail Services
D6980	37280						Scrapped	At Old Oak Common, April 1997
D6981	37281	37428				David Lloyd George	Scrapped	
D6982	37282	37405				Strathclyde Region	Stored	HNRC
D6983							Scrapped	By Hayes, Bridgend, June 1966
D6984	37284	37381					Scrapped	By Raxstar, May 2000
D6985	37285	37335					Scrapped	By Raxstar, May 2000
D6986	37286	37404				1) Ben Cruachan; 2) Loch Long	Scrapped	By CF Booth, Rotherham, January 2002
D6987	37287	37414				Cathays C&W works 1846-1993	Scrapped	By TJ Thomson, March 2009
D6988	37288	37427				1) Bont y Bermo; 2) Highland Enterprise	Scrapped	
D6989	37289	37408				1) Loch Rannoch; 2) Nick Dodson / Sue Dodson; 3) Cwmbran	Scrapped	By EMR, Kingsbury, January 2008
D6990	37290	37411				1) Institution of Railway Signal Engineers; 2) Tŷ Hafan; 3) Caerphilly Castle	Scrapped	
D6991	37291	37419				1) Mt Pinatubo; 2) Carl Haviland 1954 - 2012	In service	Direct Rail Services
D6992	37292	37425				1) Sir Robert McAlpine / Concrete Bob; 2) Pride of the Valleys	In service	Direct Rail Services
D6993	37293						Scrapped	By CF Booth, Rotherham, February 2009
D6994	37294						Preserved	By the Dales Diesel Group at Embsay & Bolton Abbey Railway
D6995	37295	37406				The Saltire Society	Scrapped	
D6996	37296	37423				1) Sir Murray Morrison 1873-1948 Pioneer of the British Aluminium Industry 2) Spirit of the Lakes	In service	Europhoenix
D6997	37297	37420				The Scottish Hosteller	Scrapped	By Ron Hull Jr, Rotherham, February 2008
D6998	37298					Victor	Scrapped	By CF Booth, Rotherham, February 2006
D6999	37299	37426				1) Mt Vesuvius; 2) Y Lein Fach / Vale of Rheidol	Scrapped	

== See also ==
British Rail Class 37 § Preservation, for details – including liveries – of preserved locomotives.
