= E-Cycle Limited =

E-Cycle Limited (formerly Remploy e-cycle) is a non-for-profit organisation based in Tonypandy that specialises in the data safe, ethical refurbishment, recycling and disposal of end-of-life IT and telecommunications equipment.

The Microsoft Authorised Refurbisher (MAR) company was set up in 2001 to help accommodate the European Union's WEEE Directive. Once cleansed of all pre-existing data - using Blancco software which has been approved for Government data cleansing use and exceeds US Federal Government standards – end-of-life IT equipment is redeployed, remarketed, donated, recycled or otherwise disposed of via approved third parties and in line with government and EU legislation.

Originally based in Barking, Essex, the company added three further sites in Porth, South Wales; Heywood, Greater Manchester and Preston, Lancashire. Of these four sites, two have now closed (Barking, and Preston), on the grounds that they are not financially sustainable. The remaining two sites, and the e-cycle business itself, was the subject of takeover negotiations by a 3rd party in 2013.

E-cycle was originally part of Remploy, the UK’s leading provider of specialist employment services for disabled people. Following the UK government's decision to stop funding Remploy factory businesses, e-cycle was acquired in a management buyout on 16 September 2013, becoming E-Cycle Limited. The company works with a range of organisations and clients, employing more than 230 people, 95 per cent of whom are disabled.

Since 2001, e-cycle has overseen the donation of some 30,000 data safe PCs to African countries through the Digital Pipeline programme.

== See also ==
- Electronic waste by country
- Sims Recycling Solutions
