= Computers for Africa =

Computers for Africa may refer to:

- Computer technology for developing areas
- Computers for African Schools
- "Computers 4 Africa" project of Digital Pipeline.
