= Harry Needle Railroad Company =

English railway company

Coordinates: 53°16′28.00″N 1°22′54.50″W

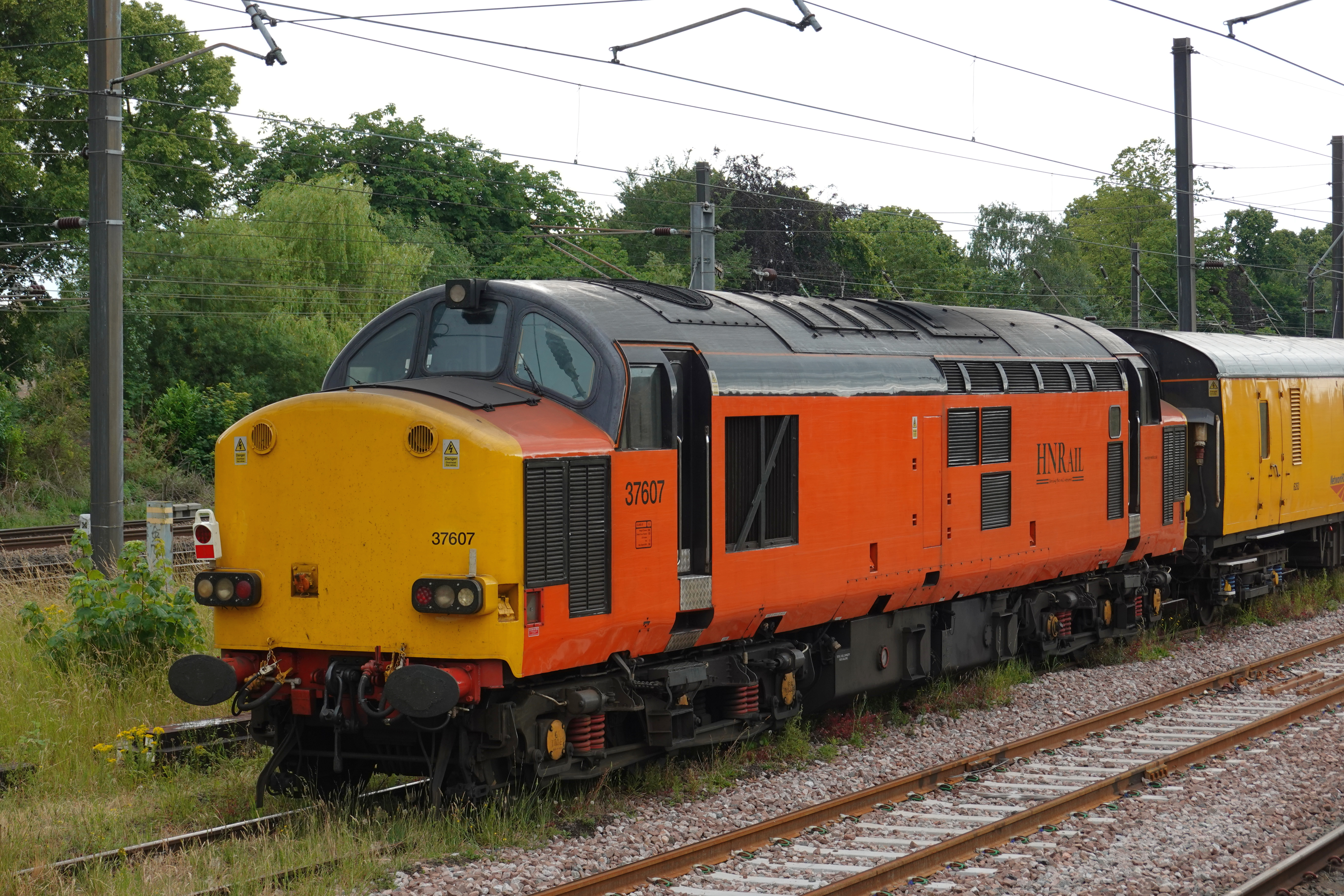
- 37607 in June 2023
- Company type: Private
- Industry: Rail
- Founded: 1998
- Founder: Harry Needle
- Headquarters: Barrow Hill Engine Shed, England
- Products: Locomotive Spot Hire and Maintenance/Repair
- Services: Mainline and Shunting Locomotive Hire, Maintenance, Repairs and Heavy Overhauls
- Parent: Swietelsky

The Harry Needle Railroad Company (HNRC) is a railway spot-hire company, based at Barrow Hill Engine Shed in Derbyshire. Prior to 2010 the company also recovered valuable spares from scrapped railway vehicles, either on the vehicle owners' sites, or at the European Metal Recycling scrapyard in Kingsbury.

HNRC was established in 1998. It adopted an orange livery. In 2002 it introduced a yellow, white and black livery.

In 2019, HNRC purchased DB Cargo UK's Worksop depot. As at October 2019, this was being used to store withdrawn InterCity 225s and Class 345s awaiting the opening of the Elizabeth line.

In January 2025, the business was sold to Swietelsky.
