= Sims Recycling Solutions =

Sims Recycling Solutions is the world's largest electrical and electronics recovery and recycling company. The company is based in the UK, with operations in 50 locations on five continents. They process 475,000 tonnes of electronic waste (e-waste) each year. They are part of the global recycler, Sims Metal Management Limited (formerly Sims Group).

Sims Recycling Solutions offers repair, refurbishment and recycling services for electronic and electrical goods, such as computers, laptops, televisions, monitors and mobile devices. From the recycling process Sims recovers materials such as precious metals, metals, plastic and glass.

The business was established in 1917 by Albert Sims, an Australian-based recycled metals dealer. In 2002, Sims Recycling Solutions was started in the UK to address the growing issue of e-waste.

In January 2020, Sims Recycling Solutions was rebranded as Sims Lifecycle Services.

== See also ==
- Electronic waste by country
- E-Cycle Limited
