= Rail Riders =

British Rail youth club (1981–1991)

Rail Riders, originally called Great Rail Club was a club for young rail enthusiasts run by British Rail in the United Kingdom between 1981 and 1991. Membership entitled children aged 5-15 to discounted rail travel, receipt of a regular quarterly magazine called Rail Riders Express, and free entry to the Rail Riders World model railway exhibit at York railway station.

The organisation used the slogan the happiest club in the land and travel, action, fun! During 1981/82 the British Rail Passenger Marketing Services department considered the future promotion of the club. The logo was based on a side-profile of the British Rail Class 370 Advanced Passenger Train (APT), and a knitting pattern for a pullover with the logo was made by Robin wools.

The club closed in 1991.

On 8 October 2019 it was announced that a new club, unconnected with the original, would revive the 'Rail Riders' name and would be launched in February 2020, nearly 30 years after the original club closed.

== Mileage competition ==
The club ran an annual mileage competition. In 1989, this competition was won by Jonathan Carter, who set a world record of 125,386 miles (201,789 km) travelled by train in one year.

== Rail Riders World ==
The Rail Riders World model railway was opened by British Rail in April 1984 inside the old tea rooms at York railway station. It was advertised by British Rail as "Britain's best model railway". Following the privatisation of British Rail the layout was sold off. It was subsequently renamed York Model Railway.

In 2011, the model railway exhibit was moved by its owner William Heron to a new location in Hemswell Cliff in Lincolnshire.

== Locomotives ==
The club sponsored two Class 47 locomotives, one from 1981 to 1988 and another from 1988 to 1992. These were 47406 Rail Riders and 47488 Rail Riders. Locomotive 47406 was named by nine-year-old competition winner David Atkins at Newcastle Central station on 10 December 1981 with an additional full-colour circular plate with the Rail Riders logo added on 12 November 1985 in recognition of increasing membership numbers. In May 1988 the plates were removed in preparation for installation on locomotive 47488, which took place on 9 August 1988 at Crewe Diesel TMD with the plates removed in August 1992.

Bachmann produced a run of 512 OO gauge models for Gaugemaster of 47406 Rail Riders in British Rail Intercity livery.
