= Hellmuth Swietelsky =

Austrian businessman (1905–1995)

Swietelsky company logo

Hellmuth Swietelsky (23 March 1905 in Traiskirchen; 23 February 1995 in Zell am See) was an Austrian businessman and founder of the construction company Swietelsky Baugesellschaft m.b.H.

Swietelsky was born in Traiskirchen (Lower Austria) on 23 March 1905. In 1936 he founded the company Swietelsky in Gmunden.

On March 15, 1933, he joined the NSDAP (membership number 1,456,963). He founded the Swietelsky company in 1936 in Gmunden in Upper Austria. His company benefited from "Aryanization" and Nazi forced labor during the Nazi regime.

In 1978 the University of Vienna awarded him the title Honorary senator of the University of Vienna (German: Ehrensenatoren der Technischen Universität Wien). He was also an honorary president of the Austrian society of street construction and was a founding member of the ÖAMTC, an Austrian automobile club.
