= Digital Pipeline =

Digital Pipeline is a United Kingdom registered charity founded in 2005 operating under the working title Computers 4 Africa to provide access to information and communications technology (ICT) in developing countries in Africa and other parts of the world.

The organisation facilitates the re-use of ICT equipment through partners who refurbish, redeploy and recycle IT equipment on behalf of businesses and government in the United Kingdom. These partners "work to Digital Pipeline’s Policies and Standards and ensure that legal, data protection, quality and environmental issues are addressed for donors and beneficiaries." A major partner over the years has been Microsoft

From 2005 to 2011 it sent more than 1,000 computers to its clients. The initial focus was on schools but now also includes libraries, clinics, universities and other projects.

== See also ==
- Computer technology for developing areas
