= C F Booth =

English scrap metal and recycling business

Coordinates: 53.4274°N 1.3704°W

C F Booth Ltd

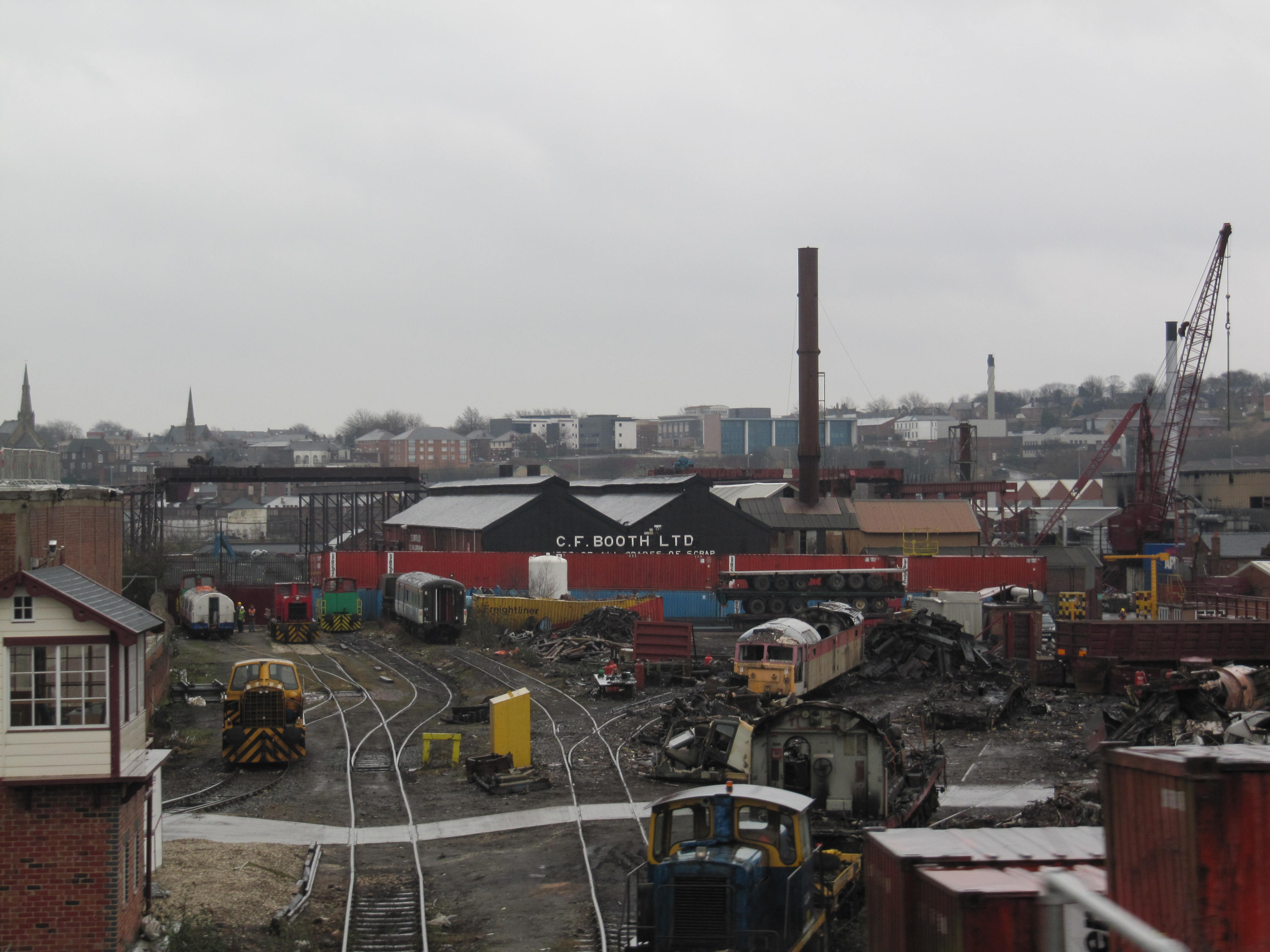
- Company type: Limited company
- Industry: Recycling
- Founded: 1920
- Founder: Clarence Frederick Booth
- Fate: Entered administration in January 2026
- Headquarters: Rotherham, England
- Website: www.cfbooth.com

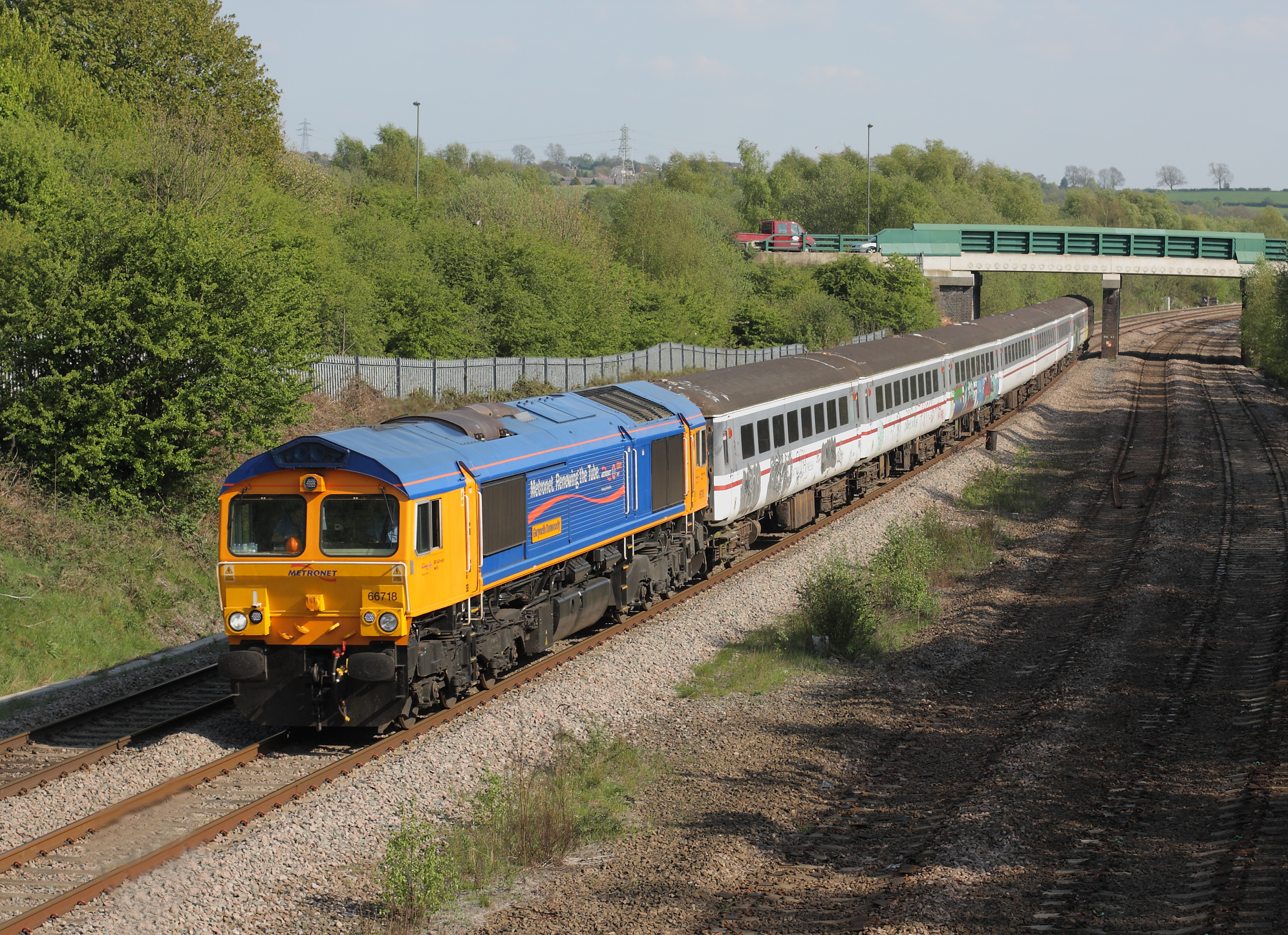
GBRF 66718 working a Shoeburyness to CF Booth service of redundant Gatwick Express coaches for scrap

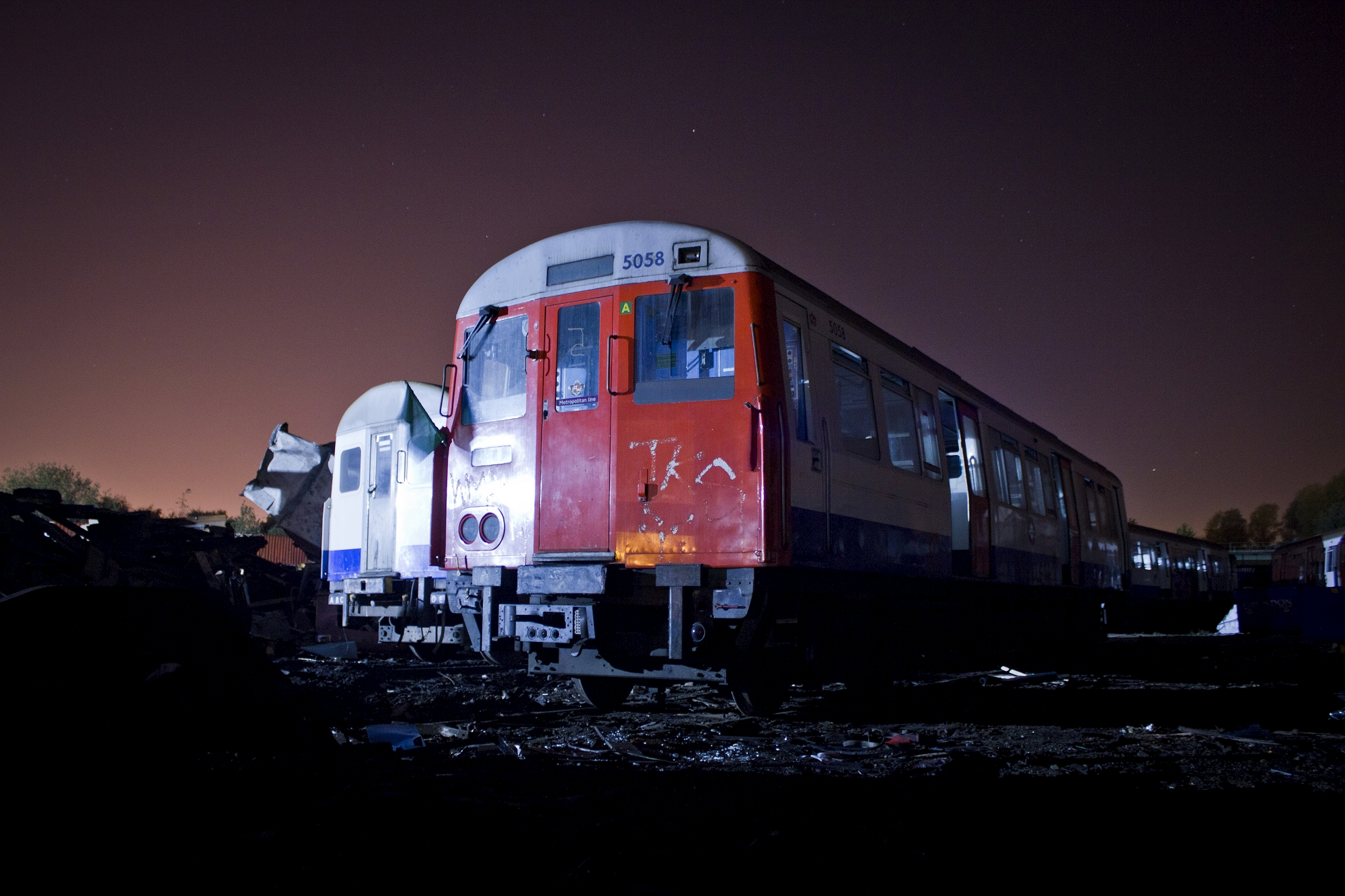
London Underground A Stock at C F Booth awaiting scrapping

C F Booth Ltd was a family-owned scrap metal and recycling business based in Rotherham, South Yorkshire, England. In January 2026, it was announced the business had gone into administration.

== Operations ==
Clarence Frederick Booth founded the business in 1920, as a metal purchaser and trader. Over the company's history, there have been a number of associated sites and businesses including: a rail served site in Doncaster (closed); and a site in Aston, near Rotherham, which concentrated on dismantling buses.

Today the company's main site is the Clarence Metal Works, located on the residual southern section of the Sheffield & Rotherham Railway adjacent to the Rotherham Ring Road. Obtained in the 1960s, the railway embankment was removed and the ground level access allowed for easier dismantling of redundant diesel and electric locomotives. This work continues at present, although a number of the vehicles bought are now resold for preservation. Many wagons, carriages, underground and departmental stock are also processed here. C F Booth was involved in one of the most high-profile scrapping contracts for British Rail of all time, with the media descending on the site for the arrival and scrapping of several vehicles from the APT fleet in 1987. Rail vehicles can still be brought in through a connection to Network Rail, although much is now brought in by road. Cable and electrical equipment is also a significant part of the business, but the interest in the railway activities and the proximity of the railway sidings to roads give this side of the business a high profile.

== Present ==
The Clarence Works site is essentially a scrapyard for ferrous and non-ferrous metals, and non-ferrous Melting Shop. The company's gantry cranes and three Derrick cranes make the site quite distinctive.

In 1989 the company introduced a copper alloy melting division, to service the foundry industry with copper-based ingots for re-melting purposes. Today it is one of the largest manufacturers of copper based products in the United Kingdom. The firm also provides machining services on large billet and slab metal sections, which supply customers in the marine, oil and gas and defence industries.

In 2012 the company achieved the Queens Award for International Trade. Company turnover is circa £170 million.

The company was added to HM Revenue & Customs' list of deliberate tax defaulters on 18 March 2025 for failure to pay £2.8 million in taxes.

In January 2026 it was announced that the company had entered administration.

== Millmoor ==
In 1987, Ken Booth bought Rotherham United F.C. out of administration. For 17 years, the Booth family owned the club, with Booth chairman. After the collapse of the ITV Digital deal, and with club debts at £3 million, the family sold the club for a nominal £1 in December 2004 to a group of supporters led by solicitor Peter Ruchniewicz, in return for gaining ownership of the club's ground at Millmoor (located adjacent to the firm's main scrapyard, the Clarence Metal Works), the Tivoli nightclub in front of it and the Hooton Lodge training ground.

The club paid the Booths £200,000 per annum in rent, and were responsible for the ground's maintenance and upkeep. The club started a ground upgrade programme, but came into dispute with the Booths over the lease period and additional fees, which included: 30 free tickets to every home match, with entertainment; advertising in the ground; and first call on away tickets and FA Cup final tickets.

In May 2008, Rotherham United left Millmoor after talks with Ken Booth broke down. The team moved to the Don Valley Stadium in Sheffield until 2012, when the club moved into a new community stadium in Rotherham. Millmoor subsequently had no professional tenant, although its car park was used by C F Booth as an overspill and storage area for former London Underground rolling stock trains awaiting scrapping.

== Contributions to Railway Preservation ==
Some of the vehicles passing through the yard have been sold on for preservation. Examples include Class 06 No. D2420/06003 in 1984, Class 08 No. D3861/08694 in 2009, Class 31 No. D5630/31206 in 2006 and Class 50 No. D426/50026 Indomitable in 1993 during Operation: Collingwood.
