= Vic Berry =

Railway scrapyard in Leicester

Coordinates: 52.629°N 1.145°W

- Industry: Recycling
- Founded: 1973
- Founder: Vic Berry
- Defunct: 1991
- Headquarters: Leicester, England

Vic Berry's Scrapyard was a large railway scrapyard situated in the former Great Central Railway Braunstone Gate goods yard in Leicester.

== Operations ==
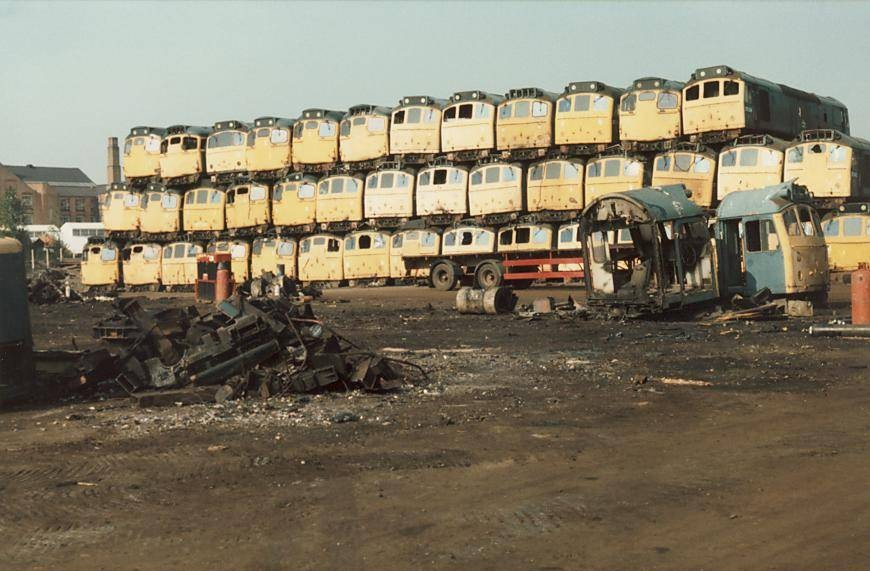
Vic Berry's well-known stack of Type 2 diesel locomotives, 3 October 1987.

Vic Berry established his Leicester scrapyard in 1973 on the site of what had been the former GC Braunstone Gate goods yard, just south of Leicester Central railway station. Like Woodham Brothers at Barry, Vic Berry focused initially on breaking up redundant passenger coaches and goods wagons. The first locomotives did not arrive until 10 years later in April 1983 when three Class 76 electric locomotives arrived for breaking up.

The yard is best known for scrapping large quantities of Class 25 and Class 27 diesel-electric locomotives. This led to the infamous 'stack' of Class 25 and 27 locomotives which reached their peak in 1987 with 30 examples stacked. The yard did not exclusively deal with these locomotives, as examples of classes 02, 03, 08, 20, 26, 31, 33, 37, 40, 45, 47, 50, 82, 83, 84 and 85 were scrapped on site, along with a large quantity of BR DMUs. Vic Berry also scrapped a London Underground train and ex-CIE 201 Class locomotives 208 and 219 in 1990.

It was also involved in the refurbishing and repainting of rolling stock, with one London Underground 1967 Stock train refurbished in 1990.

Vic Berry also specialized in asbestos removal as well as scrapping withdrawn locomotives and rolling stock. This was of value to railway preservation societies, who sometimes would benefit from purchasing a locomotive from Vic Berry as it would have already been stripped of asbestos. As the scrapyard was connected to the Leicester to Burton upon Trent Line, the yard contained a large number of locomotives, coaches, wagons, and DMUs which were held for either purchase or scrapping.

The yard moved from scrapping locomotives to DMUs and rolling stock in December 1990 when what was believed to be the last complete locomotive in the yard, 25213, was scrapped. Another 18 class 25s were broken up by Vic Berry at other sites; five were broken up off-site while the other 13 were also broken up off-site but with their cabs subsequently transported to Leicester.

== Fire and closure ==
In the early hours of Sunday 10 March 1991, a serious fire broke out in the scrapyard which took firefighters several hours to bring under control, by which time serious damage had been caused. The cause of the fire, which led to widespread distribution of airborne asbestos across the city, has never been determined. As a result of the fire and after months of difficulties, the Vic Berry Company ceased trading in June 1991, the final straw being the failure to reach a deal with its landlord, British Rail, for the decontamination of 170 grounded bodies in the Western Boulevard which contained asbestos. The company owed creditors a reported £4 million. On 7 June, British Rail gave Vic Berry five days to begin clearing the site or it would bring in a contractor to do so. Vic Berry began to trade under his own name from 11 June 1991, employing around a dozen of his former staff, and began to clear the site on 14 June. The closed site was nevertheless left significantly contaminated from the disposal process.

== Redevelopment ==
The site was re-developed as a part of the Leicester City Challenge project in 1996 / 1997 as Bede Island.

== Diesel locomotives rescued for preservation ==
Despite being well known for scrapping various classes of diesel engines en masse, not all of the diesel locomotives, and some rolling stock as well, that entered the scrapyard were scrapped. Just like the more well-known Barry Scrapyard, though no steam locomotives were sent nor scrapped at Vic Berry's, some of the locomotives were actually purchased for preservation owing to the asbestos removal facility. Eighteen diesel locomotives were rescued from the Vic Berry scrapyard, including one Class 24 locomotive, twelve Class 25 locomotives, one Class 26 locomotive, two Class 27 locomotives and one Class 40 locomotive were purchased for preservation during the late 1980s. One Class 03 shunter D2069/03069 worked at the scrapyard from 1984 until 1991 when it was sold to the Vale of Berkeley Railway for preservation. Interestingly, most of the preserved BR Class 40 locomotives were sent here for asbestos removal before arriving at heritage railways.

BR Class 03 engines rescued from Vic Berry

- D2069/03069 is now preserved at the Vale of Berkeley Railway.

BR Class 24 locomotives rescued from Vic Berry

- D5061/24061 is now preserved at the North Yorkshire Moors Railway.

BR Class 25 engines rescued from Vic Berry

- D5148/25035 Castell Dinas Brân now works on the Great Central Railway.
- D5207/25057 is now at the North Norfolk Railway.
- D5209/25059 is now at the Keighley & Worth Valley Railway.
- D5222/25072 is now at the Caledonian Railway.
- D7523/25173 John F Kennedy at the Battlefield Line Railway.
- D7541/25191 now works on the South Devon Railway.
- D7594/25244 is now at the Kent and East Sussex Railway.
- D7615/25265 Harlech Castle now stored at Burton-On-Trent.
- D7628/25278 Sybilla now works at the North Yorkshire Moors Railway.
- D7659/25309 now works at Peak Rail.
- D7629/25279 is now at the East Lancashire Railway.
- D7663/25313 is now at the Wensleydale Railway.
- D7633/25904 (25283) is now at the Dean Forest Railway.

BR Class 26 locomotives rescued from Vic Berry

- D5314/26014 now works at the Caledonian Railway.

BR Class 27 locomotives rescued from Vic Berry

- D5401/27056 is now at the Great Central Railway.
- D5410/27059 is undergoing restoration at Leicester.

BR Class 40 locomotives rescued from Vic Berry

- D213/40013 Andania now works at Crewe Diesel TMD and now does mainline tours.
