= European Metal Recycling =

Global scrap metal company

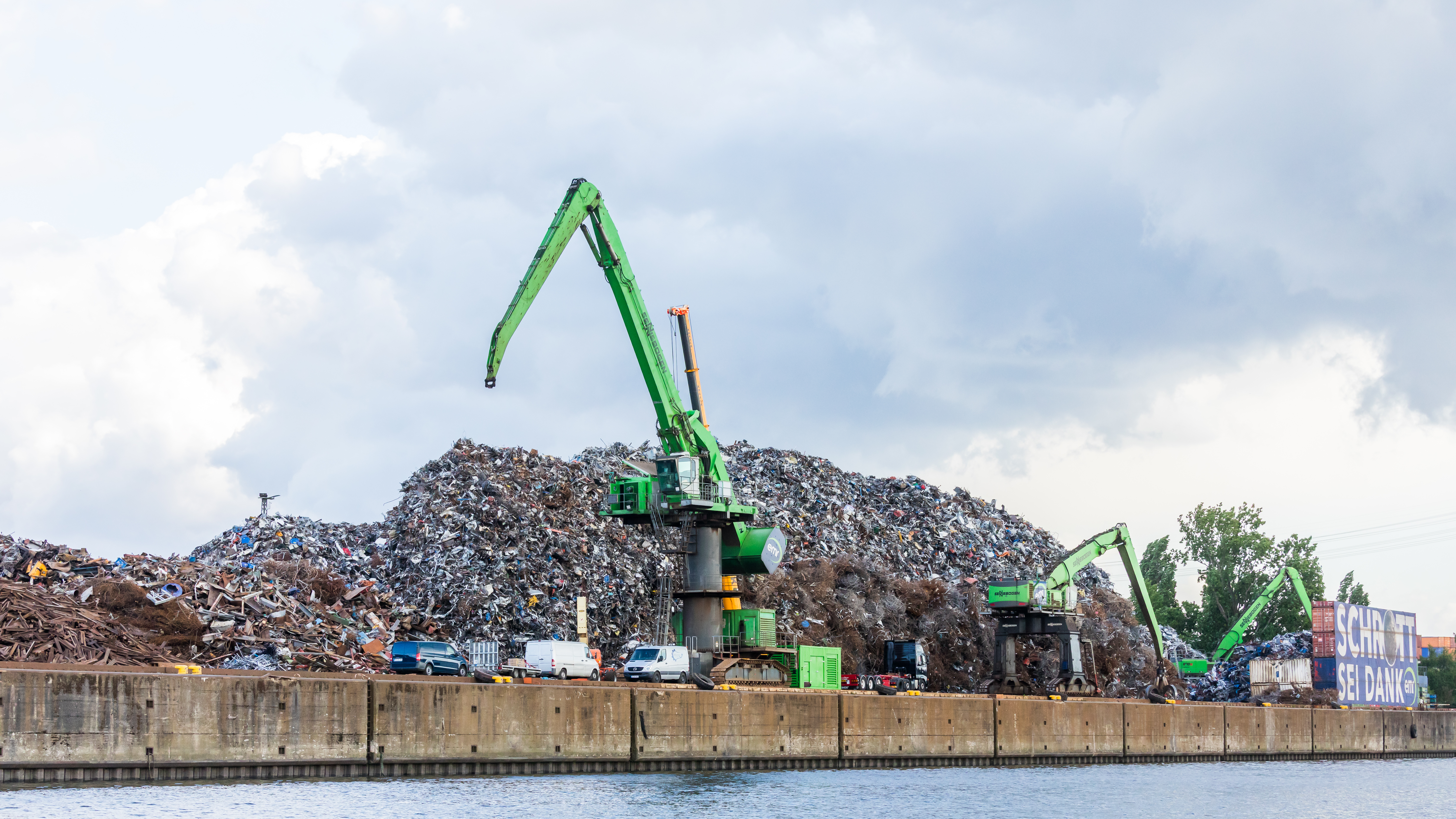
- EMR European Metal Recycling in the harbour of Hamburg, Germany
- Type: Private. Subsidiary
- Industry: Recycling
- Founded: 1994
- Headquarters: Warrington, England
- Key people: Chris Sheppard, CEO
- Revenue: ▼£2.915 billion (2019)
- Net income: ▲£70 million (pre-tax) (2019)
- Owner: Sheppard family (100%)
- Number of employees: 3,449 (2019)
- Parent: Ausurus Group Ltd
- Website: http://uk.emrgroup.com/

European Metal Recycling is a global scrap metal company, founded in 1994 by Phillip Sheppard. In 2013, their annual pre-tax profits for the UK were £47 million. They employ around 4,000 people in over 150 locations all around the world. Christopher Phillip Sheppard is the current director of the company. In 2019, EMR was the 16th largest private company in the U.K.

== See also ==
- Harry Needle Railroad Company
