= MC Metals =

Coordinates: 55.8731°N 4.2269°W

- Industry: Recycling
- Founded: 1987
- Founder: Jim MacWilliam
- Headquarters: Springburn, Scotland

MC Metals was a metal recycling company based in the Springburn area of Glasgow, Scotland.

== History ==
MC Metals was founded by Jim MacWilliam in 1987. The company was made famous through the scrapping of huge numbers of British Rail diesel locomotives in the 1980s and 1990s. It operated on railway-owned land adjacent to British Rail Engineering Limited's Glasgow Works. A condition of its lease was that only ex-railway scrap could be processed there. It also carried out asbestos removal work. Rail vehicles arrived from all parts of the UK via a rail connection or by road. The site is now occupied by a Tesco supermarket.

== Contributions to Railway Preservation ==
Despite being a metal recycling company, this facility played a role in helping some locomotives, primarily diesel locomotives, find new lives at various heritage railways. One example was Class 20 No. D8098 in the early 1990s. This locomotive now works at the Great Central Railway. Another example is Class 26 No. D5301/26001 which was rescued in the mid-1990s and now works at the Lakeside & Haverthwaite Railway. One railcar belonging to the Class 111 No. 59575 was rescued from here as well. One Class 45 locomotive No. 45125 was rescued from this facility during the late 1980s and early 1990s and now works at the Great Central Railway.
