= PWM =

PWM may refer to:

== Science and technology ==
- Position weight matrix, a representation in motifs in biological sequences
- Pulse-width modulation, a technique for controlling the average power delivered by an electrical signal
- PWM (window manager), a Unix-based X window manager

== Other uses ==
- Panzerwurfmine, a type of German anti-tank hand grenade
- Portland International Jetport, an airport in the U.S.
- Professional Wealth Management, a financial magazine
- Permanent Way Machine, the British Rail Class 97/6 locomotives
- Polskie Wydawnictwo Muzyczne, the Polish Music Publishing House
