= British Rail Class 02 =

Class of diesel locomotives

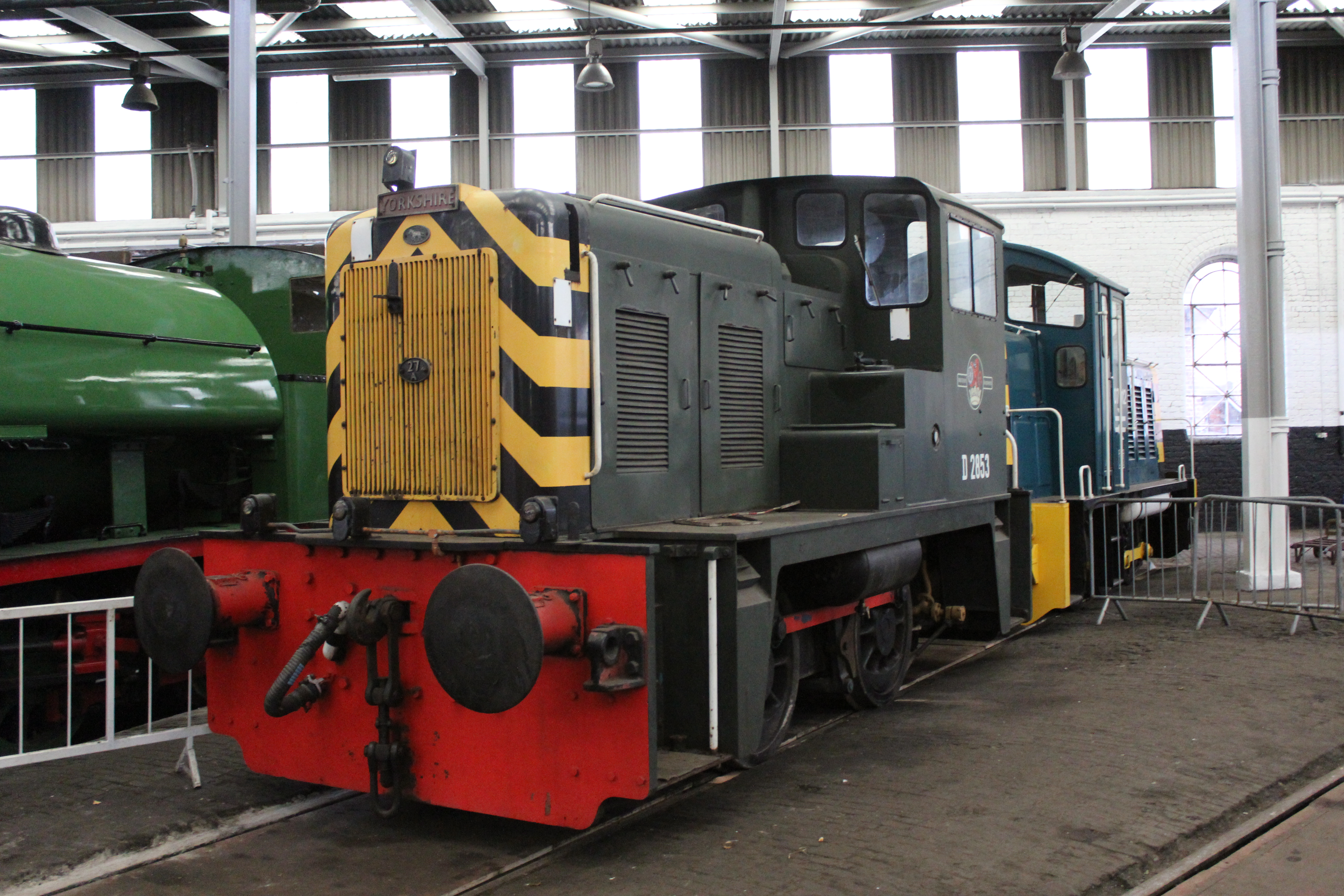
- D2853 at Barrow Hill Roundhouse
Type and origin
- Power type: Diesel-hydraulic
- Builder: Yorkshire Engine Co.
- Serial number: 2809–2818, 2843–2852
- Build date: 1960–1961
- Total produced: 20
Specifications
- Configuration
  - Whyte: 0-4-0DH
  - UIC: B
- Gauge: 4 ft 8 1/2 in (1,435 mm)
- Wheel diameter: 3 ft 4 in (1.016 m)
- Minimum curve: 1 chain (20 m)
- Wheelbase: 6 ft 0 in (1.829 m)
- Length: 21 ft 11 1/2 in (6.693 m)
- Width: 8 ft 6 in (2.59 m)
- Height: 11 ft 5 1/4 in (3.486 m)
- Loco weight: 28.60 long tons (29.06 t; 32.03 short tons)
- Fuel capacity: 300 imp gal (1,400 L; 360 US gal)
- Prime mover: Rolls-Royce C6NFL176
- Engine type: Straight-6 diesel
- Transmission: Rolls-Royce 10,000-series 3-stage twin-disc torque converter, manually operated YEC reduction and reversing final drive gearbox
- Train brakes: Vacuum
Performance figures
- Maximum speed: 19.5 mph (31.4 km/h)
- Power output: Engine: 170 hp (130 kW); At rail: 100 hp (75 kW)
- Tractive effort: 15,000 lbf (66.7 kN) (max)
- Brakeforce: 21 long tons-force (210 kN)
Career
- Operators: British Railways
- Number in class: 20
- Numbers: D2850–D2869; later 02001–02004
- Nicknames: Pugs
- Axle load class: RA 2
- Withdrawn: December 1969 – June 1975
- Disposition: Seven preserved, remainder scrapped

The British Rail Class 02 are a class of twenty 0-4-0 diesel-hydraulic shunting locomotives built by the Yorkshire Engine Company in 1960 (first ten, D2850-D2859) and 1961 (D2860–D2869) for service in areas of restricted loading gauge and curvature such as docks. They had the door to the cab at the rear, with a railed veranda behind the cab; this feature was very unusual on British Rail locomotives, although it was used on many Yorkshire Engine Co. designs and is quite normal in North American practice.

== Operation ==
| Code | Name | Quantity |
|---|---|---|
| 8J | Allerton | 7 |
| | Lostock Shed | 5 |
| | Patricroft Yard | 2 |
| 9D | Newton Heath | 3 |
| | Arpley Yard | 1 |

Initial deliveries were to Bank Hall shed in Liverpool and most were allocated to depots around Liverpool or Manchester.

=== Withdrawal ===
With the changes in the role of the British railway system and the closing of many of the facilities in which the Class 02 locomotives worked, they were increasingly surplus to requirements. The first locomotives were withdrawn in December 1969 from the Preston division of the Midland Region and by the end of 1971 there were only four left in service with British Rail. Of these, three survived long enough to enter the BR Total Operations Processing System computer system: 02001 (formerly D2851), 02003 (D2853), and 02004 (D2856), and all three were withdrawn in June 1975 from Allerton TMD. Being between nine and fourteen years old when withdrawn, they were still capable of work, and eleven were sold to private industry, with the remaining nine being scrapped.

Table of withdrawals
| Year | Quantity in service at start of year | Quantity withdrawn | Locomotive numbers | Notes |
|---|---|---|---|---|
| 1969 | 20 | 5 | D2861–63/68–69 | D2862 and D2868 sold for industrial use. |
| 1970 | 15 | 10 | D2850/54–55/58–60/64–67 | D2854, D2858 and D2865-7 sold for industrial use. |
| 1971 | 5 | 1 | D2857 | |
| 1972 | 4 | 0 | – | |
| 1973 | 4 | 1 | D2852 | Allocated TOPS number 02002. |
| 1974 | 3 | 0 | – | |
| 1975 | 3 | 3 | 02001/03–04 | 02003 sold for industrial use. |

== Fleet list ==
| Unit number | Withdrawal | Disposal |
|---|---|---|
| D2850 | 1970 | Scrapped |
| D2851 (later 02001) | 1975 | Scrapped |
| D2852 | 1973 | Scrapped |
| D2853 (later 02003) | 1975 | Saw further use st L.C.P. Fuel Co., Pensnett Trading Estate, Shut End; Preserved. |
| D2854 | 1970 | Saw further use at C.F. Booth Ltd., Rotherham; Preserved. |
| D2855 | 1970 | Scrapped |
| D2856 (later 02004) | 1975 | Saw further use at Redland Roadstone Ltd., Mountsorrel; Scrapped. |
| D2857 | 1971 | Saw further use at Bird Groups Scrapyard, later scrapped. |
| D2858 | 1970 | Saw further use at Lowton Metals Ltd., Haydock; Preserved. |
| D2859 | 1970 | Scrapped |
| D2860 | 1970 | Preserved |
| D2861 | 1969 | Scrapped |
| D2862 | 1969 | Sold for further use by NCB (Western Area) at Norton and Chatterley Whitfield collieries, then scrapped. |
| D2863 | 1969 | Scrapped |
| D2864 | 1970 | Scrapped |
| D2865 | 1970 | Saw further use at Blue Circle Industries Ltd., Kilverington Gypsum Works; Scrapped. |
| D2866 | 1970 | Saw further use at Arnott Young & Co. (Shipbreakers) Ltd., Dalmuir Yard; Preserved. |
| D2867 | 1970 | Saw further use at Redland Roadstone Ltd., Barrow-Upon-Soar; Preserved. |
| D2868 | 1969 | Saw further use st L.C.P. Fuel Co., Pensnett Trading Estate, Shut End; Preserved. |
| D2869 | 1969 | Scrapped |

== Service with British Railways ==
Many of the locomotives were based in the Liverpool area, serving places like Bank Hall Shed, Allerton TMD, Liverpool Exchange and Garston Dock. Others went to Lostock Shed in Preston or Patricroft Yard near Manchester.

=== D2850 ===
D2850 entered service in 1960 was allocated to Bank Hall Shed, D2850 was transferred to Allerton TMD, where it spent the rest of its service. It was withdrawn and scrapped shortly in 1970 after just 10 years of service.

=== D2851 or 02001 ===
D2851 was one of three locomotives that survived long enough to enter TOPS, spending nearly its entire life at Allerton Depot before it was withdrawn in 1975 and scrapped shortly afterwards. Even as late as 1973, the locomotive still carried its old number. Due to its short lifespan, there are few reported sightings of this locomotive.

=== D2852 ===
D2852 survived in BR service longer than most other locomotives in this class and was allocated the TOPS number 02002, but never carried it. After leaving Bank Hall Shed, the locomotive was transferred to Speke Junction in 1966, and worked at Liverpool's Alexandra Dock during its time there. However, the locomotive was moved to Allerton Depot two years later. While in its early years, still in Bank Hall Shed, the units worked mostly the Great Howard Street Goods Yard. Despite its allocations, the unit was occasionally moved to Liverpool Brunswick Dock. While in Allerton Depot, it frequently worked alongside the aforementioned D2851 prior to receiving its TOPS number. D2852 was withdrawn in October 1973, and was scrapped on site by Avon Transmissions on the first of March 1976.

=== D2853 or 02003 ===
D2853 was given the works number 2812 when first built. It entered service in October 1960, and after leaving Bank Hall Shed it worked the Liverpool Docks until it was then transferred to Speke Junction. Despite being transferred to the Docks, it was still officially allocated to Bank Hall Shed. The locomotive was present on the Derby Works Open Day on 31 August 1968. Also in 1968, the unit was transferred from Speke Junction to Allerton TMD with D2852, where it would spend the rest of its BR life working. It was also seen moving goods around the area of Allerton, at Liverpool Exchange in 1973, and in Garston docks in 1975. In 1974, the unit began carrying its new TOPS number, 02003. However, that number didn't last long, as the unit was withdrawn in June 1975. Its last years were spent working with D2851, D2852 and D2856. Following withdrawal, it was sold to LCP Fuels of Pensnett near Birmingham.

=== D2854 ===
After Leaving Bank Hall Shed, D2854 stayed in the Liverpool area, but was withdrawn shortly after in 1970 and sold to C F Booth of Rotherham.

=== D2855 ===
D2855 entered service in Bank Hall Shed in November 1960 and was a very short lived locomotive. It was moved to Arpley Yard in Warrington towards the end of its life in the late 1960s before being scrapped on 1 June 1970.

=== D2856 or 02004 ===
D2856 was one of three units to survive long enough to carry a TOPS number. It left Bank Hall Shed in October 1966 and was transferred to Speke Junction and then to Allerton Depot in May 1968. It worked there alongside the other units that survived long enough to enter TOPS until the last three units were withdrawn in June 1975. In 1974, however, the unit was briefly used in Liverpool Exchange. D2856 was stripped for spares in September 1975, with the engine compartment being destroyed in the process, and the rest of the locomotive was scrapped the following month. Before withdrawal and carrying its new number, 02004 worked briefly at Bank Hall Shed once again.

=== D2857 ===
D2857 was given the works number 2816, and like many others of the class worked in only Merseyside under British Rail starting in Bank Hall Shed in December 1960. It then found itself in the Great Howard Street Goods Yard, then Liverpool Exchange, Speke Junction and finally Allerton Depot, where it resided until April 1971. It was then sold to Lowton Metals Ltd. in Haydock.

=== D2858 ===
D2858 originally worked in Newton Heath until 1970, when it was permanently withdrawn and then was sold over to ICI Fertilisers in Widnes, who painted the engine red.

=== D2859 ===
D2859 was given the works number 2825. It was allocated to Burton shed in December 1960 and stayed there until December 1964. It was replaced by Class 03 D2384, which was itself transferred in October 1967. It also worked around the Workington area before being left to rust at the seaside for a number of years prior to scrapping.

=== D2860 ===
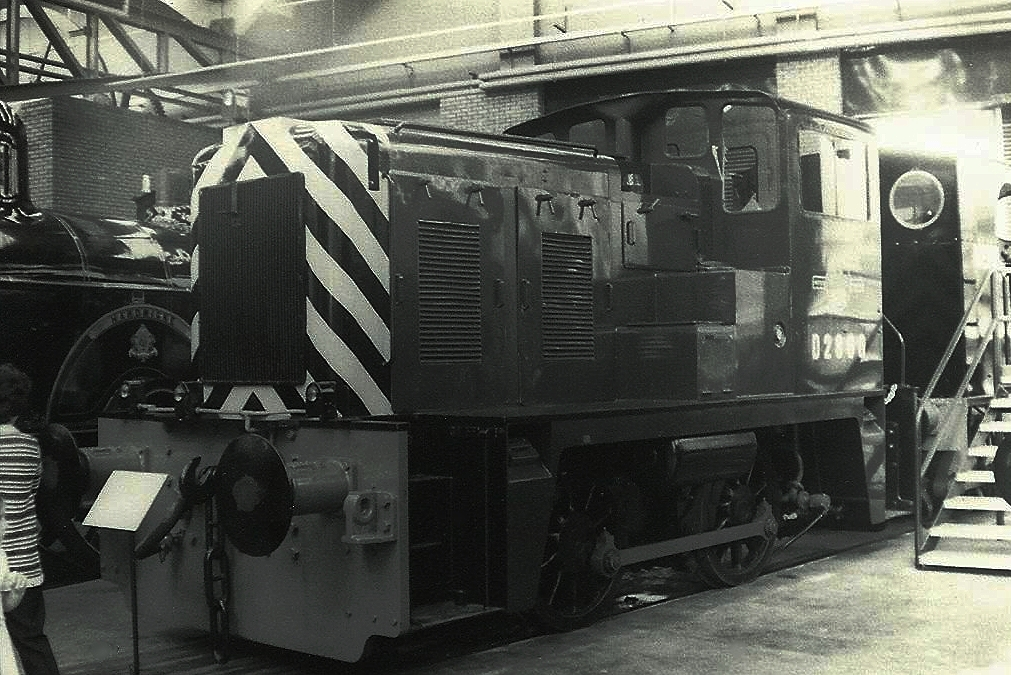
D2860 in 1979

D2860 was withdrawn in 1970, and four years later was picked for use in the National Railway Museum as a shunting locomotive, where it still resides today and is labelled as preserved.

=== D2861 ===
D2861 left bank hall shed and was moved briefly to Horwich works in 1963, but was soon after brought to Preston where it worked until December 1969, when it was one of the first five locomotives of the class to be withdrawn. It was scrapped shortly afterwards. Within Preston, it was stored in Lostock Shed. Its number was commonly placed on Class 02 Model trains.

=== D2862 ===
D2862, after leaving Bank hall shed, was moved to Preston at Lostock shed in 1964 and was one of the first five members of the class to be withdrawn in December 1969. It was sold to NCB afterwards to work on various collieries.

=== D2863 ===
D2863 operated in the same areas as D2862 until withdrawal 1969 after which it was scrapped.

=== D2864 ===
D2864 left Bank Hall shed and was sent slightly east to Patricroft Yard, but then was moved to Newton heath where it was stored alongside D2869. It was eventually scrapped in 1970.

=== D2865 ===
D2865 left Bank Hall shed and worked in Warrington before being withdrawn, having been in service only nine years at the time. It was sold into industrial use at Blue Circle Industries Ltd., Kilverington Gypsum Works.

=== D2866 ===
D2866 lived a short, unknown BR life and was withdrawn in 1970, and was sold to Arnott Young & Co. in Dalmuir yard.

=== D2867 ===
D2867 was given the works number 2850. It left Bank Hall shed in 1963 and went to Newton Heath. The following year it was transferred to Fleetwood, and then Lostock Hall the year after that. In 1966, it was moved to Speke Junction and then in 1968 moved again to Allerton Depot, where it was withdrawn in 1970 and was sold to Redland Roadstone Ltd. in Barrow upon Soar. During its BR life it was once transported to Mountsorrel.

=== D2868 ===
D2868 was allocated to Bank Hall shed for the first three years of its life, but spent much of its time working in other areas, such as the Great Howard Street Goods Yard, Liverpool Exchange, Redfern Street Sidings and Garston Dock, all of which are in the Merseyside area where most members of the class worked. In August 1964, it was transferred to Fleetwood where it would work alongside D2867. It was quickly transferred to Lostock Hall one month later. It was one the first five members of the class to be withdrawn, and due to still being in good condition was sold to L.C.P. Fuel Co., Pensnett Trading Estate, Shut End, as 02003 was. While in Lostock Hall, the unit often worked in Greenbank Sidings.

=== D2869 ===
D2869 was given the works number 2852 and was the last locomotive in the class to be built and only worked eight years, leaving Bank Hall shed for Lostock Hall before withdrawal, being moved to Newton Heath for storage before ultimately being scrapped by T W Ward at Beighton, Sheffield in August 1971.

== Industrial use ==
Eight withdrawn locomotives were sold into industrial use in a large variety of locations.

=== 02003 or Peter ===
02003 was sold to LCP Fuels of Pensnett/Brierley Hill in the West Midlands, being renamed Peter. It began operations in 1976, and spent most of its time in small enclosures with tight turns hauling small industrial goods, but in 1980, 02003 was seen working with Class 25 unit 25 273 in the main Pensnett yard working with coke hoppers and larger wagons. It spent its life there until 1997, when it was acquired by the South Yorkshire Preservation Society.

=== D2854 ===
D2854 was purchased in 1971 by the C F Booth Scrapyard of Rotherham for use there. By 1985, much of the exterior of the unit had been cut up and one could see through one end of the locomotive to the other, likely for maintenance. In 1989, the locomotive was sold to the South Yorkshire Railway (now the Heritage Shunters Trust) for preservation, where it still resides.

=== D2857 ===
D2857 operated as a scrapyard shunter in Bird Group's scrapyard in Long Marston, where it worked for over a decade before being stored, after which its condition deteriorated. It was stored alongside an ex-GWR iron tool van until 1992, when it was finally scrapped.

=== D2858 ===
D2858 worked in ICI Fertilisers in Widnes until the 1980s, when the factory was closed. It was then sold to Lowton Metals near Haydock, who overhauled the locomotive, and it worked there until 1988 when it was moved to Ripley and then preserved.

=== D2862 ===
D2862 was sold to NCB and it worked on the Norton and Holditch Collieries near Stoke-on-Trent. It was painted into a new light blue livery and was ultimately scrapped after withdrawal.

=== D2865 ===
D2865 was sold to Blue Circle Industries Ltd., Kilverington Gypsum Works where it worked until c. 1984. It was repainted into a yellow livery.

=== D2866 ===
D2866 was sold to Arnott Young & Co. in Dalmuir Yard and was repainted into a yellow livery. Over time, it began to rust and was renumbered AY1021, but was eventually sold into preservation.

=== D2867 ===
D2867 was sold to Redland Roadstone Ltd, in Barrow upon Soar, having previously been on hire to a Welsh cement company while still technically under BR's influence. Redland Roadstone kept the unit until 1995 when it was no longer needed, and sold it to Meadowhall works with hopes that it would be preserved. The unit was painted in Redland Roadstones's typical green livery. D2867 was occasionally used while allocated there, most notably in 1987 when it went to Banbury and Derby. The locomotive was one of three in the class to be given a name, in this case Diane, while in industrial use.

=== D2868 ===
D2868 was used alongside 02003 at LCP Fuels at Shut End in the West Midlands, and was given the name Sam. It worked there between 1970 and 1987. It was then given to Meadowhall Works for long store. It did much of its work alongside D2853 Peter, but despite being newer was withdrawn before it. Photos show the two locos working in tandem.

== Preservation ==
There are seven locomotives now in preservation, where their small size makes them suitable as workshop shunters or for use in track maintenance work. One (D2860) is the works shunter for the National Railway Museum in York, where it is used to move much larger exhibits around.

- D2853 Peter by Barrow Hill Engine Shed
- D2854 by Heritage Shunters Trust
- D2858 at Midland Railway – Butterley
- D2860 at National Railway Museum, York
- D2866 by Heritage Shunters Trust
- D2867 Diane at Battlefield Line Railway
- D2868 Sam by Barrow Hill Engine Shed

=== D2853 ===
D2853 was originally sent over to Meadowhall in 1997, before later being transferred to the Rutland Railway Museum and eventually in 2004 to Barrow Hill Engine Shed, where it resides today. The unit is often only posing statically on display however the unit does occasionally move around on its own power, sometimes with other units. In 2006, it was moved to Scunthorpe Steelworks, also known as Appleby Frodingham It was briefly moved back to Barrow Hill on multiple occasions, although it wouldn't be until 2016 when it was finally sent there permanently. The unit was painted in BR Green livery as of 2020.

=== D2854 ===
D2854 was purchased from C F Booth in 1989 by the Heritage Shunters Trust, and was originally moved to Meadowhall in 1989, where it was overhauled. It was not seen working on Peak Rail until 2003, where it has continually ran there since.

=== D2858 ===
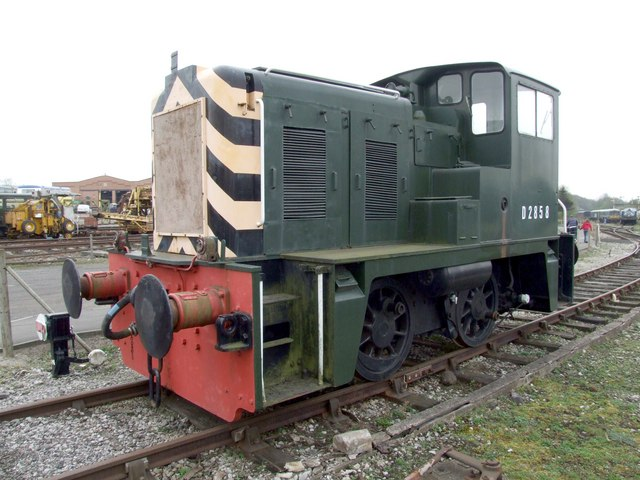
D2858 in Swanwick junction in 2009

D2858 was moved to Swanwick Junction in 2002, and in 2004 was repainted into BR Green livery. Since then, D2858 has been preserved in the Midland Railway Centre, and it often runs between Swanwick Junction and Butterley and occasionally further.

=== D2860 ===
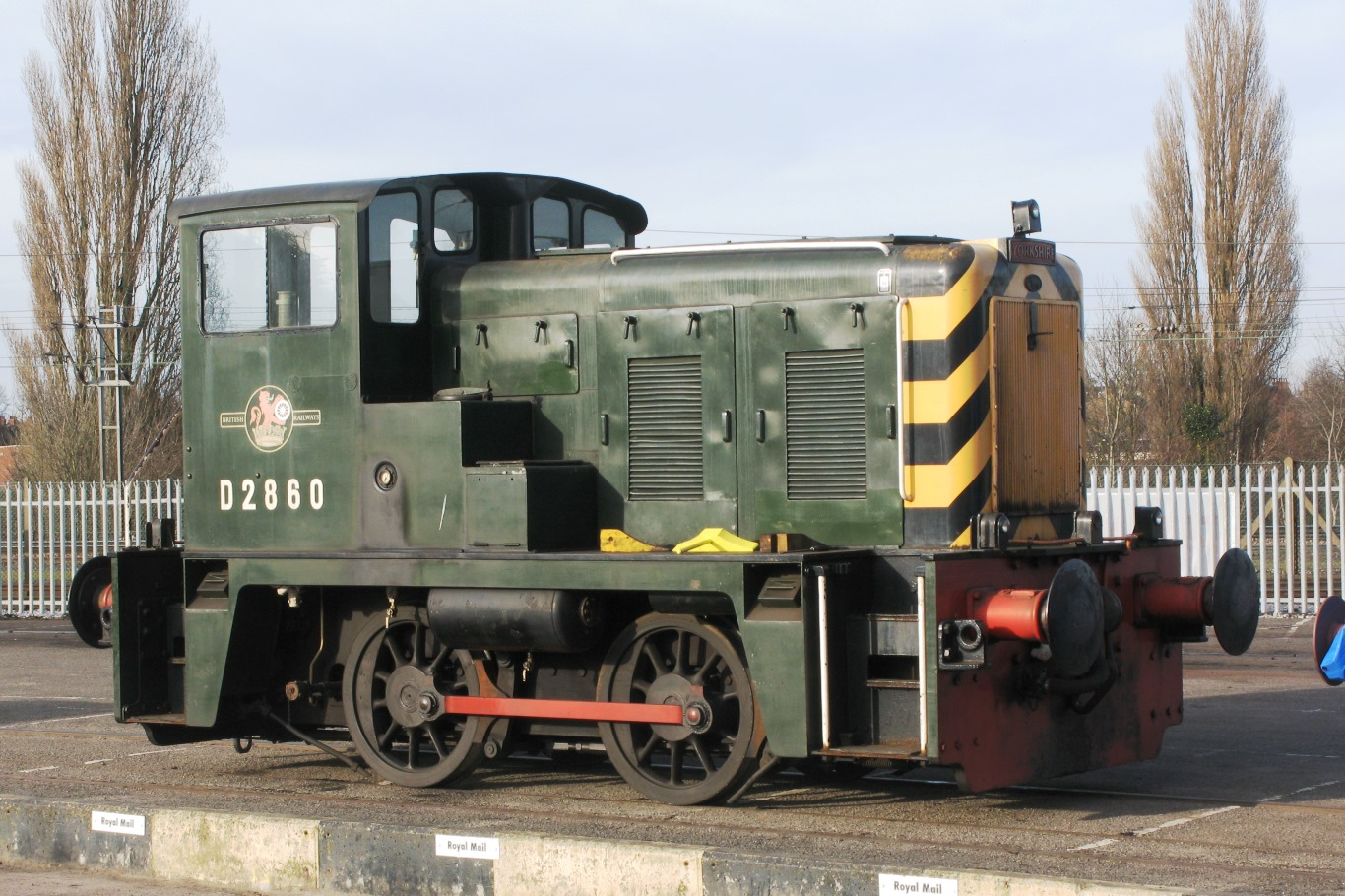
D2860 outside the Great Hall in the National Rail Museum

D2860 has resided at the National Railway Museum since shortly after it opened and still works there today. It operates as a shunting locomotive which moves other exhibits around, particularly ones which cannot move on their own power, and it is rarely put on display due to the Class 02 being relatively common in preservation.

=== D2866 ===
D2866 started its preserved life in Bridge of Dun on the Caledonian Railway and was still carrying its old livery and number. It was eventually moved to Meadowhall for restoration, and eventually made its way to Rowsley on Peak Rail, where it was dismantled to replace broken parts. It now regularly operates there and is in good condition, and has never left Peak Rail since leaving Meadowhall.

=== D2867 ===
D2867 spent nearly six years in Meadowhall before it was sold to the Battlefield Line Railway in 2001, which is where it resides today. It has, however, been on tour once through Runcorn, Crewe, Nuneaton, Manchester and Warrington. Upon arrival in the Battlefield Line Railway, it was still in its previous industrial livery. The unit has been refurbished by the railway and is in operable condition.

=== D2868 ===
D2868 was stored in Meadowhall until 2004 when it was sold to Barrow Hill Engine Shed, where it resides today. It travelled to Durham in 2006 and to Widnes in 2007. Between 2008 and 2009 it went on loan to Peak Rail, and again in 2013–2014. Between 2012 and 2016, it went to Manchester and was spotted by Deansgate. After 2016, it went back to Barrow Hill where it still resides, mostly on static display, though it is capable of moving under its own traction.

== Technical details ==
The engine is a Rolls-Royce C6NFL176 6-cyl. in-line connected to a Rolls-Royce series 10,000 three-stage twin-disc torque converter and a manually operated YEC reduction and reversing final drive gearbox. The engine and transmission are mounted at an angle of 30 degrees to the horizontal to allow the overall length and height of the locomotive to be reduced.

Unlike most earlier British Rail shunters, the Class 02s were built with train vacuum brakes.

== Industrial locomotives ==
In addition to these locomotives produced for British Railways, around fifty very similar locomotives (most with diesel-electric transmissions and/or more powerful engines) were produced for industrial customers. Many of these can now be found in preservation as well, since few industrial users have their own railways anymore. Quite a few are painted in fictitious British Railways livery and numbering, such as 02 101.

== Model trains ==
The Class 02 is available as a model in OO gauge from the Danish manufacturers Heljan, and also available in O gauge.
