= British Rail Class 07 =

British class of diesel shunting locomotives

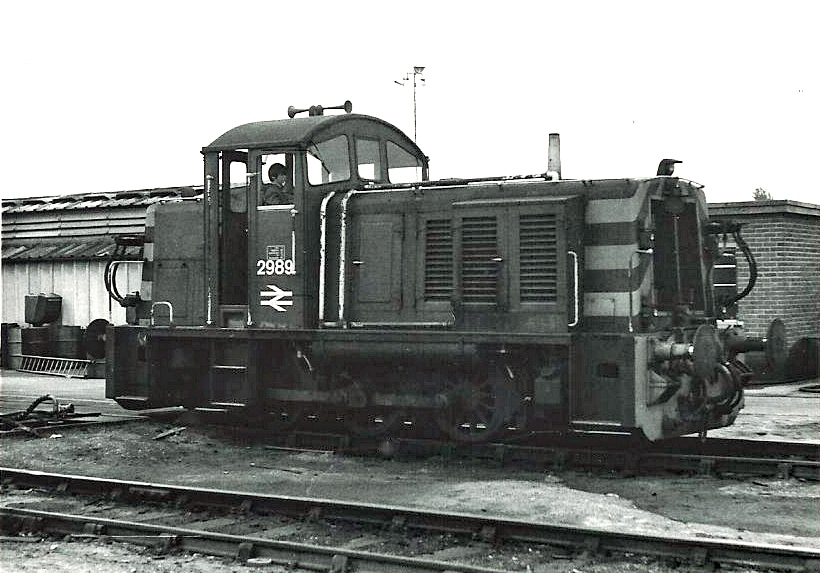
- 2989 at Eastleigh Works in 1973.
Type and origin
- Power type: Diesel-electric
- Builder: Ruston & Hornsby
- Serial number: 480686–480699
- Model: LSSE
- Build date: 1962
- Total produced: 14
Specifications
- Configuration
  - Whyte: 0-6-0DE
  - UIC: C
- Gauge: 4 ft 8 1/2 in (1,435 mm) standard gauge
- Wheel diameter: 3 ft 6 in (1.067 m)
- Wheelbase: 8 ft 7 1/2 in (2.629 m)
- Length: 26 ft 9 1/2 in (8.17 m)
- Width: 8 ft 6 in (2.591 m)
- Height: 12 ft 10 in (3.912 m)
- Loco weight: 42.90 long tons (43.6 t; 48.0 short tons)
- Fuel capacity: 300 imp gal (1,400 L; 360 US gal)
- Prime mover: Paxman 6RPHL
- Traction motors: AEI RTA6652
- Train heating: None
- Train brakes: Vacuum, some later Dual (Air & Vacuum)
Performance figures
- Maximum speed: 27.5 mph (44.3 km/h)
- Power output: Engine: 275 hp (205 kW)
- Tractive effort: Maximum: 28,240 lbf (125.6 kN)
Career
- Operators: British Railways
- Number in class: 14
- Numbers: D2985–D2998, later 07001–07014
- Axle load class: RA 7 (RA 6 from 1969)
- Locale: Southampton Docks; Eastleigh Works
- Withdrawn: May 1973 – July 1977
- Disposition: Seven preserved, remainder scrapped

The British Rail Class 07 is a type of diesel-electric shunter locomotives. The 14 members of the class were built by Ruston & Hornsby in 1962 for the Southern Region of British Railways; they were used primarily at Southampton Docks and later at Eastleigh Works.

== Background ==
The 07 class was originally designed to replace steam power on the Southampton Docks network, which at its peak consisted of some 80 miles of track and immediately prior to the introduction of diesel power was operated by six ex-LBSCR 0-6-0 class E2 and fourteen ex-Southern Railway USA class (Note: So-called because they were purchased from the US Army Transportation Corps following World War II.) 0-6-0 tank locomotives.

The specifications for the class arose from a report produced by the General Managers of British Transport Docks and the Southern Region of British Railways discussing the relative merits of the 204 hp (152 kW) Class 04 and 350 hp (260 kW) Class 12 0-6-0 diesel shunters. Due to the need to traverse small radius curves on the docks network, it was concluded that a compromise between the shorter wheelbase of the former and greater power output of the latter was desirable, thus giving rise to the requirement for a locomotive with a fixed wheelbase not exceeding 10 ft (3.0 m) and maximum power output of around 275 to 300 hp (205 to 224 kW) (with a weight not exceeding 10 tons).

== Operation ==
The class was notorious for having the axleboxes run hot when travelling at high speed. This was initially encountered during delivery of the first locomotive, and subsequent deliveries were made by road. A later trial move of one Class 07 to Selhurst Depot for tyre profiling also resulted in overheating axlebox problems and all subsequent moves of any distance, particularly those to British Rail Engineering Limited workshops, were made by road. This is in contrast to other shunter classes that would commonly have had their coupling rods removed and traction motors isolated and would then form part of a train heading in the appropriate direction. Class 08s were commonly moved in this fashion at up to 35 mph (56 km/h) – overnight wagon-load trains being utilised if possible.

For operation at Southampton Docks, the class was based in the former steam shed in the Old Docks near the River Itchen, work being carried out there by a fitter sent from Eastleigh.

The members of the class that had TOPS numbering applied were also equipped with high-level air brake pipes, allowing them to move Southern Region electric multiple units, and three locomotives were used at Bournemouth EMU Depot for a period. This was not their principal work, but they were often employed around their home depot on general shunting duties. They were relatively fast for shunters and it was envisaged that they would be used to trip local traffic to/from Southampton docks. Accordingly, they were equipped, from new, with mainline headcode marker lights (six for the SR). In practice they were seldom used for this because of the hot axlebox problem, which also affected the possibility of the class working away from either Southampton Docks or Eastleigh Works.

== Withdrawal ==
Numbers 2988, 2992 and 2998 were withdrawn from BR service without bearing TOPS numbers, and were cut up at Eastleigh Works; 2988 in 1973, 2992 and 2998 in 1976. 2991, which was allocated the number 07007, was also withdrawn from capital stock before bearing its TOPS number, but remained in use at Eastleigh Works. Of the locos to bear TOPS numbers, 07003 and 07009 were withdrawn in 1976, and sold to P Wood of Queenborough, Kent; 07009 was exported to Italy, and 07003 was sold to British Industrial Sand at Oakamoor, Staffordshire, being subsequently scrapped in 1985. 07010 was sold directly into preservation, and the remaining locos were sold for industrial use during 1976 and 1977: 07001 to Staveley Limeworks, Buxton; 07002/6/12 to Powell Duffryn, Kidwelly (where 07002 and 07006 were scrapped in the 1980s); 07013 to Dow Chemical Company, King's Lynn.

Table of withdrawals
Year	Quantity in service at start of year	Quantity withdrawn	Locomotive numbers	Notes
1973	14	4	2988/91–92/98	2991 went into industrial use
1976	10	3	07003/09–10	All went into industrial use except 07010
1977	7	7	07001–02/05–06/11–13	All went into industrial use

== Post-BR use and preservation ==
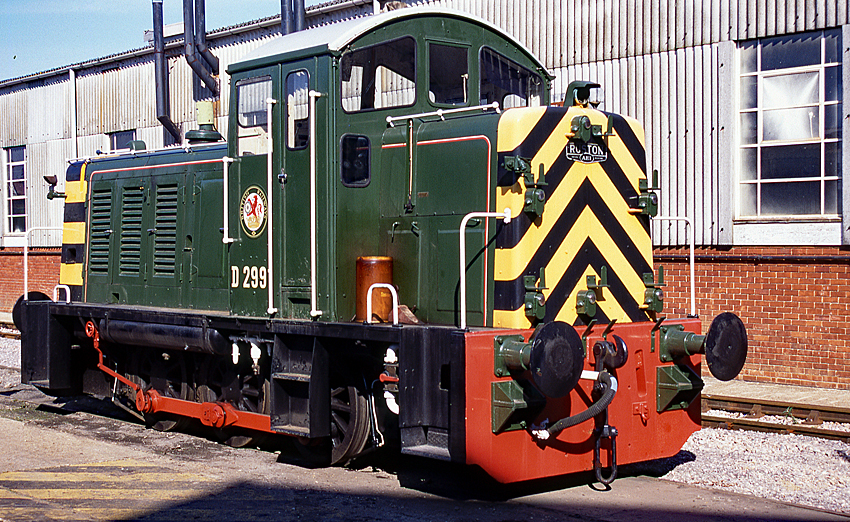
D2991 in 1994.

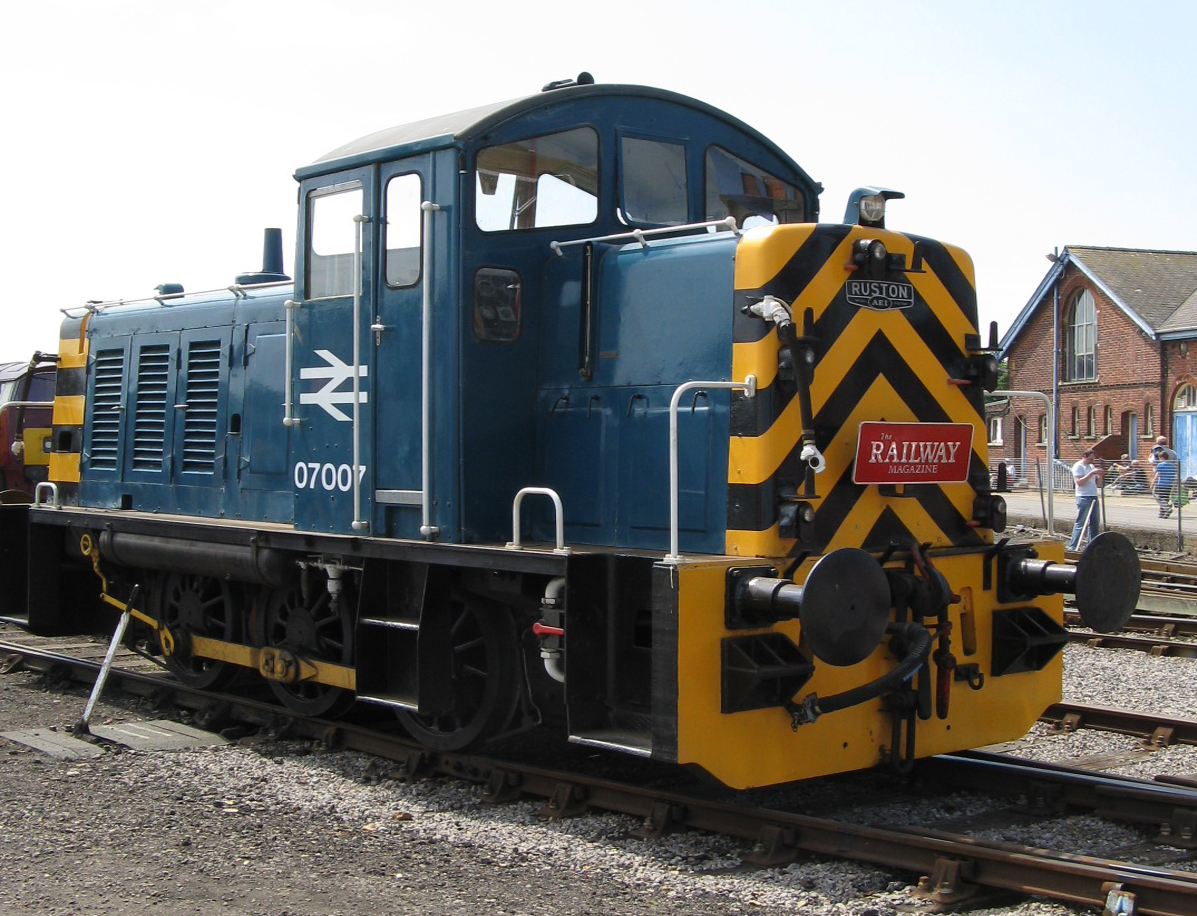
07007 at Eastleigh Works open day, 2009

The locomotives were short-lived and this class had been withdrawn by British Rail by the end of 1977. Several were bought for industrial use and have subsequently passed into preservation. Two locomotives, no. 07001, owned by Harry Needle Railroad Company (HNRC), and 07007, owned by Knights Rail Services, are mainline registered. All surviving locomotives are listed below.

- 07001 – Formerly HNRC, now preserved by Heritage Shunters Trust at Peak Rail. Fully operational, currently repainted into a blue livery with 'wasp' ends but without numbering (as of 1 September 2013).
- 07005 – Preserved at the Great Central Railway
- 07007 – In use by Knights Rail Services at Eastleigh Works. Mainline registered in April 2008. Currently painted in Rail Blue livery.
- 07010 – Preserved on Avon Valley Railway in BR Blue livery. Currently awaiting repairs following electrical failure December 2014. Repainted into BR Blue September 2013.
- 07011 – Privately owned at St Leonards TMD. Rail Blue livery.
- 07012 – Formerly HNRC, now preserved at Barrow Hill.
- 07013 – Formerly HNRC, externally restored in Rail Blue livery Now at the East Lancashire Railway.

== Class summary ==
Pre-TOPS Number	TOPS number	Date into Service	Date withdrawn	Image	Further use or date scrapped
D2985	07001	27 June 1962	2 July 1977		Staveley Limeworks, Buxton 1976, later preserved, now owned by Harry Needle Railroad Company located at Barrow Hill
D2986	07002	16 June 1962	2 July 1977		Powell Duffryn, Kidwelly, 1976, Scrapped on site in the 1980s
D2987	07003	16 June 1962	4 October 1976		P Wood, Queenborough 1976, later British Industrial Sand at Oakamoor, scrapped 1985
D2988	07004 (not carried)	16 June 1962	6 May 1973		Scrapped at Eastleigh Works in 1973
D2989	07005	27 June 1962	2 July 1977		ICI Wilton, Middlesbrough 1976, named Langbaurgh whilst at ICI Wilton. Now preserved at the Great Central Railway
D2990	07006	13 July 1962	2 July 1977		Powell Duffryn, Kidwelly 1976, scrapped on site in the 1980s
D2991	07007 (not carried while in capital stock)	21 July 1962	6 May 1973		Knights Rail Services at Eastleigh Works
D2992	07008 (not carried)	28 July 1962	6 May 1973		Scrapped at Eastleigh Works in 1976
D2993	07009	21 August 1962	4 October 1976		P Wood, Queenborough 1976, later exported to Italy, scrapped in 1997
D2994	07010	5 September 1962	4 October 1976		Preserved firstly at West Somerset Railway, now at Avon Valley Railway
D2995	07011	22 September 1962	2 July 1977		Privately owned at St Leonards TMD, fitted with high-level brake pipes on one end for shunting DEMU vehicles
D2996	07012	6 October 1962	2 July 1977		Recently purchased for shunting at Bridgnorth at the Severn Valley Railway
D2997	07013	20 October 1962	2 July 1977		Dow Chemical Company, King's Lynn 1976, preserved firstly at Barrow Hill, now at the East Lancashire Railway
D2998	07014 (not carried)	10 November 1962	6 May 1973		Scrapped at Eastleigh Works in 1976

== Technical details ==
- Engine: Ruston/Paxman 6RPHL Mk. 3, 60° V6, 29.3-litre, 6-cylinder, indirect injection, 4-stroke
- Main Generator: AEI RTB6652
- Traction motor: AEI RTA6652, spigot mounted on a double reduction, axle-hung, final drive gearbox

Locomotive (air) and train (vacuum) brakes were fitted from new. Air train braking was added later, in some cases with high-level air brake pipes for use with Southern Region electric multiple units. Originally the class had radio communication sets fitted for use at Southampton Docks, the aerial located on the top right-hand corner of the engine bonnet. These were removed when operation at the docks ceased.

== Models ==
Class 07 is available as a ready-to-run model in OO gauge by Heljan and in kit and R-T-R form by Silver Fox.
