= SYZ =

SYZ may refer to:

- Banque SYZ, a boutique Swiss private bank which is part of the Syz Group
- Shiraz Shahid Dastgheib International Airport (IATA: SYZ), an international airport located in Shiraz, Iran
- SYZ conjecture, an attempt to understand the mirror symmetry conjecture
