= South Yorkshire Railway (disambiguation) =

South Yorkshire Railway may refer to:

- South Yorkshire Railway, also known as the South Yorkshire Coal Railway, South Yorkshire Doncaster and Goole Railway Company, or South Yorkshire and River Dun
- The railway preservation society incorporated as the South Yorkshire Railway Co. Ltd., see Heritage Shunters Trust
- South Yorkshire Joint Railway
- South Yorkshire Junction Railway
