= British Rail Class 01 =

British diesel-mechanical locomotive class

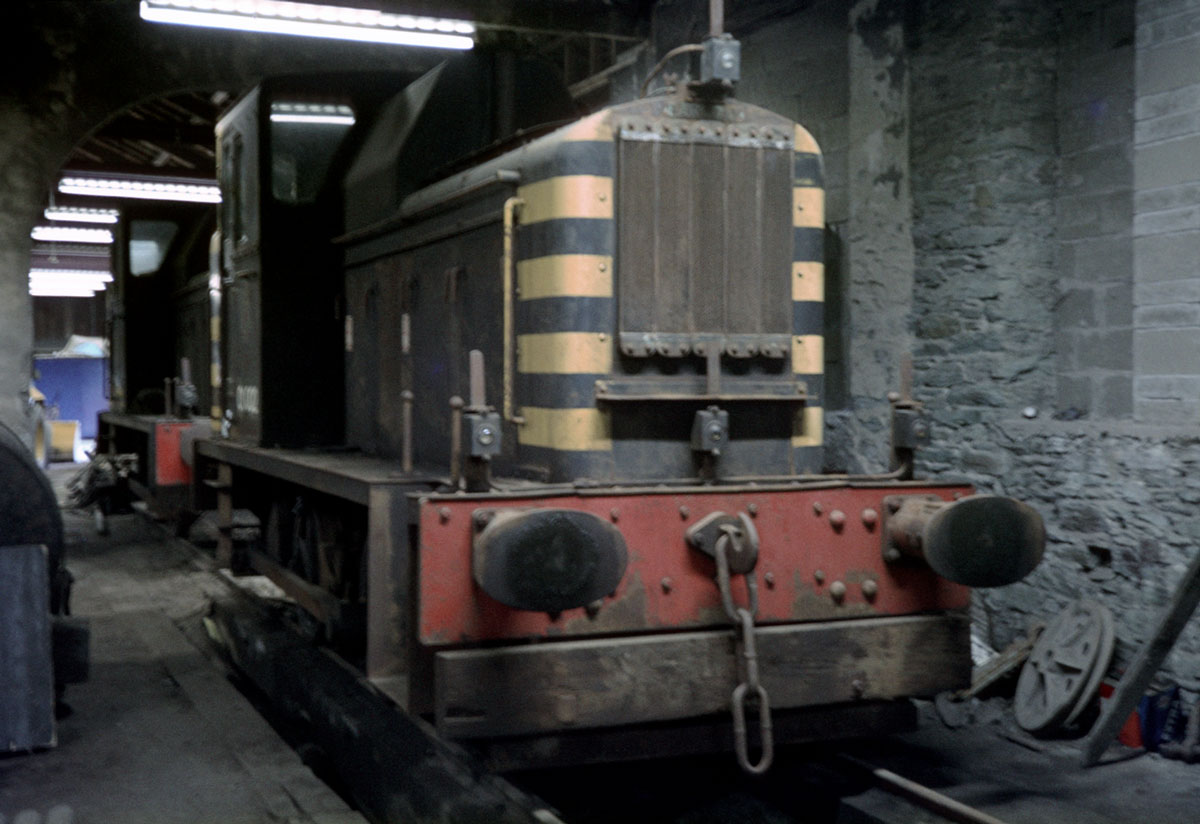
- A Class 01 at Holyhead Breakwater
Type and origin
- Power type: Diesel-mechanical
- Builder: Andrew Barclay Sons & Co
- Serial number: 395–398, 424
- Build date: 1956 (4), 1958 (1)
- Total produced: 5
Specifications
- Configuration
  - Whyte: 0-4-0DM
  - UIC: B-dm
- Gauge: 4 ft 8 1/2 in (1,435 mm)
- Wheel diameter: 3 ft 2 in (0.965 m)
- Minimum curve: 1.06 chains (21 m) normal; 1.00 chain (20 m) dead slow
- Wheelbase: 6 ft 0 in (1.829 m)
- Length: 23 ft 8 in (7.214 m)
- Width: 8 ft 5 1/2 in (2.578 m)
- Height: 11 ft 10 1/2 in (3.620 m)
- Loco weight: 25.05 long tons (25.5 t; 28.1 short tons)
- Fuel capacity: 325 imp gal (1,480 L; 390 US gal)
- Prime mover: Gardner 6L3
- RPM
  - Maximum RPM: 1,200
- Engine type: 6-cylinder in-line Four-stroke diesel engine
- Transmission: Mechanical: Wilson SE4, 4-speed epicyclic gear box, Vulcan-Sinclair type 23 rigid hydraulic coupling, to a Wiseman 15LGB reverse and final drive unit.
- Loco brake: Straight Air
- Train brakes: 11503–11506: none; 81: Vacuum
Performance figures
- Maximum speed: 14.25 mph (22.9 km/h)
- Power output: Engine: 153 hp (114 kW); At rail: 102 hp (76 kW)
- Tractive effort
  - Continuous: 12,750 lbf (56.7 kN) at 2.63 mph (4.23 km/h)
- Brakeforce: 15 long tons-force (150 kN)
Career
- Operators: British Railways
- Numbers: 11503–11506, 81 (departmental); later D2953–D2956; later 01001–01002
- Axle load class: RA 1
- Withdrawn: 1966–1968 (except D2954–5), 1981
- Preserved: D2953, D2956 (1st)
- Scrapped: 1969, 1982
- Disposition: 2 preserved, 3 scrapped

The British Rail Class 01 diesel locomotive is a short wheelbase 0-4-0 diesel-mechanical design intended for use in areas with tight curves and limited clearance.

== History ==
Four examples were built by Andrew Barclay Sons & Co. of Kilmarnock (Scotland) in 1956. They were numbered 11503–11506, then D2953–2956, and two survived long enough to become 01001 (D2954) and 01002 (D2955) on the TOPS system. Their original depot allocation was to Stratford (30A). A fifth locomotive with detail differences was built in 1958 for departmental use at Peterborough Permanent Way Depot. It was originally No. 81 but was renumbered D2956 in July 1967 after the original D2956 had been withdrawn.

The locomotives were very versatile, despite having only 153 horsepower (114 kW) available, and were small enough to operate on any railway on the BR standard gauge network, limited only by their low top speed of 14 1/4 miles per hour (22.9 km/h). They were also very reliable for such a small class, although Stratford Docks, where they originally worked, was not noted for having much use for them. Two examples, D2953 and D2956, were sold in 1966 and a third locomotive (the second D2956) followed in 1968.

D2954 and D2955 survived in BR service because they were required to service the Holyhead Breakwater, being the only locomotives light enough for that track, the pair were used by William Wild & Sons Ltd. They were renumbered 01001 and 01002 under TOPS. 01001 was not used after 1973 but was cannibalised for spare parts to keep its sister loco in service. 01001 was withdrawn in 1979, and 01002 followed in 1981. 01002 had last run when the Breakwater Railway closed in July 1980. Both locomotives were cut up on site still carrying their original livery of British Railways black with black-and-yellow "wasp stripe" warning ends and the original British Railways "unicycling lion" emblem; they were the last locomotives in BR service to do so.

Table of withdrawals
Year	Quantity in service at start of year	Quantity withdrawn	Locomotive numbers	Notes
1966	5	2	D2953/56 (i)	Both went into industrial use
1967	3	1	D2956 (ii)	Formerly Departmental No. 81
1968–78	2	0	—	
1979	2	1	01001	
1980	1	0	—	
1981	1	1	01002	

== Fleet list ==
Locomotive Number	Withdrawn	Disposition
D2953	1966	Sold to Thames Matex Ltd., West Thurrock, later preserved
D2956 (i)	1966	Sold into industrial use, later preserved
D2956 (ii)	1967	Scrapped
01001	1979	Scrapped
01002	1981	Scrapped

== Technical details ==
Class 01 locomotives had a Gardner 6-cylinder in-line, 4-stroke 6L3 engine of 153 hp (114 kW) at 1,200 rpm connected to a Wilson SE4, 4-speed epicyclic gear box with a Vulcan-Sinclair type 23 rigid hydraulic coupling, and a Wiseman 15LGB reverse and final drive unit. The wheels were connected by coupling rods and driven by a jackshaft.

== Preservation ==
Two pre-TOPS members survive in preservation:

- D2953 by Heritage Shunters Trust at Rowsley South, Peak Rail
- the first D2956 on the East Lancashire Railway

== Re-use of the '01' TOPS code ==
More recently, the sub-classification 01/5 has come into use to refer to small, privately owned shunters certified to run on the national network. As such, 01/5 is a collective grouping of a number of very different locomotives, having in common only that they are small, hitherto unclassified shunters of designs never given a BR classification.

== General references ==
- Marsden, Colin J. (1981). Motive power recognition: 1 Locomotives. Shepperton: Ian Allan Publishing. ISBN 978-0-7110-1109-0. OL 3524380M. Wikidata Q105978222.
- Williams, Alan; Percival, David (1977). British Railways Locomotives and Multiple Units including Preserved Locomotives 1977. Shepperton: Ian Allan Publishing. ISBN 978-0-7110-0751-2. OL 15153791M. Wikidata Q105978228.
