= Banque SYZ =

Swiss private banking group

Bank Syz SA
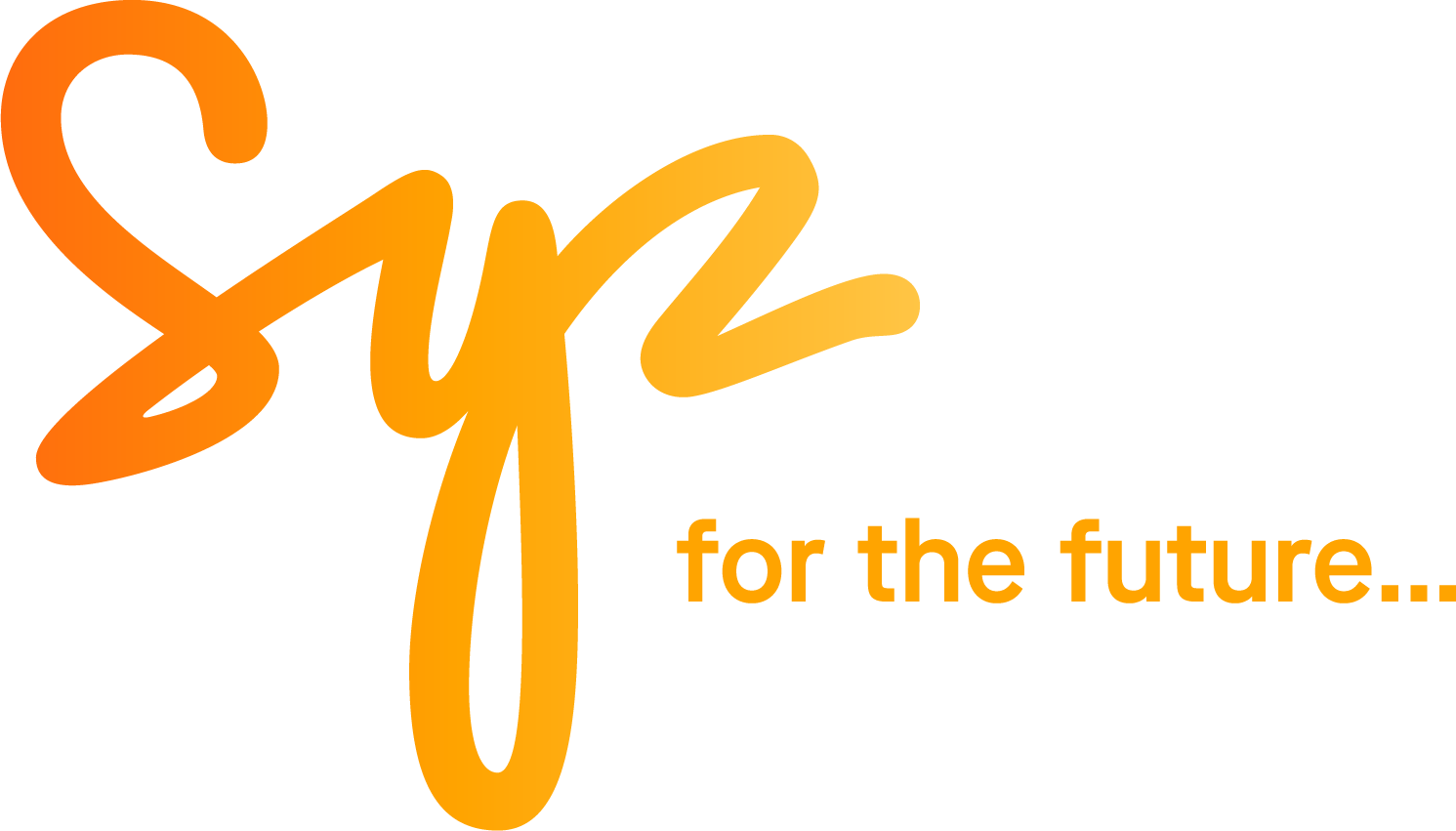
- Company type: Société anonyme (SA)
- Industry: Financial services
- Founded: 1996; 30 years ago
- Headquarters: Geneva, Switzerland
- Number of locations: 6
- Key people: Eric Syz
- Net income: 9,034,582 Swiss franc (2022)
- Website: www.syzgroup.com

Bank Syz Ltd is a boutique Swiss private bank which is part of the Syz Group and was founded in 1996 by Eric Syz, Alfredo Piacentini and Paolo Luban. In June 2014, two of the co-founders decided to continue their careers in a different direction. Eric Syz therefore took control of almost all the shares of the Group's holding company.

The Group is dedicated to wealth management through three lines of business - private banking (Bank Syz), asset management (Syz Asset Management) and liquid and illiquid alternatives (Syz Capital).

The Group has offices in Switzerland in Geneva, Zurich, Lugano, Locarno and internationally in Istanbul and Johannesburg. In December 2021, the Group's assets under management amounted to US $29.5 billion.

== History ==
Bank Syz SA was founded in Geneva in January 1996. In July of the same year it established the Luxembourg mutual fund OYSTER.

In 1999, the bank began its expansion at the international level in Nassau by establishing Syz Bank & Trust, and in Switzerland with the opening of offices in Lugano then Locarno. In July 2001, new offices were opened in Luxembourg, immediately followed by the location of offices in London in August 2001.

In 2002, it partnered with the Italian group Albertini to establish the management company Albertini Syz in Milan, which was to become a bank in November 2003 under the name Banca Albertini Syz In 2013, Syz took control of Banque Albertini Syz

In March 2003, the Bank opened its Zurich branch.

After having opened an office in Hong Kong in January 2007, it joined with the Spanish group N+1 in July 2009 to establish the management company N+1 Syz in Madrid.

In 2010, the bank decided to group together all its institutional management activities in a new entity, Syz Asset Management.

In 2011, Syz opened an office in Paris, dedicated to the marketing of its OYSTER investment funds to the French institutional clientele.

In June 2012, it established Syz Swiss Advisors, a Swiss management company registered with the U.S. Securities and Exchange Commission (SEC) and especially dedicated to U.S. investors.

In October 2013, following a labour law dispute with a former employee, judicial proceedings were instituted against the bank in France on account of suspicions of concealed work. No judgment has been handed down to date.

Two of the three founding partners, Alfredo Piacentini and Paolo Luban, left the Group in June 2014. Eric Syz then became the majority shareholder and CEO.

In May 2014, the bank announced its decision to outsource some of its back office and IT activities, with a possible 30 to 45 redundancies out of a total of 450 employees.

In June 2014, the bank announced the opening of a representative office in Dubai, after having obtained the authorization of the Dubai Financial Services Authority.

In July 2014, Bank Syz was ranked best Swiss bank in terms of soundness in the annual ranking of the world's largest banks (Top 1000 World Banks 2014), drawn up by the British magazine The Banker, a member of the Financial Times Group. The banks’ soundness was measured by the Capital/Asset ratio (basic equity capital and reserves divided by assets).

In October 2014, Bank Syz was voted Best Private Banking Boutique by the jury of the Global Private Banking Awards 2014 organized by the British magazines Professional Wealth Management (PWM) and The Banker, two publications in the Financial Times group.

In July 2015, Syz acquired the Royal Bank of Canada's Swiss branch.

In November 2016, Bank Syz was voted for the third year in a row Best Private Banking Boutique by the jury of the Global Private Banking Awards 2016 organized by Professional Wealth Management (PWM) and The Banker.

In February 2017, Bank Syz was voted “Best Private Bank – Investment Management Platform” at WealthBriefing Swiss Awards 2017.

In September 2017, Syz Asset Management opened a branch in Madrid.

In June 2020, Bank Syz opened a representative office in Istanbul.

In 2015, Bank Syz opened a representative office in Johannesburg.

In December 2021, Bank Syz acquired Zurich-based Independent Asset Management company BHA Partners AG.

In 2022, all three members of the Syz family (Eric, Marc, Nicolas) received personal awards for outstanding achievements in their field, and for successfully reorienting the business towards a greater focus on private banking and private banking and private markets, away from the traditional asset management that they were known for.

== Memberships ==
Bank Syz SA is member of the following associations:

- Swiss Bankers Association
- Fondation Genève place financière
- Association of Swiss Commercial and Investment Banks
- Swiss Association of Asset Managers
- Associazione bancaria ticinese
