= Mangapps Railway Museum =

Railway museum in Essex, England

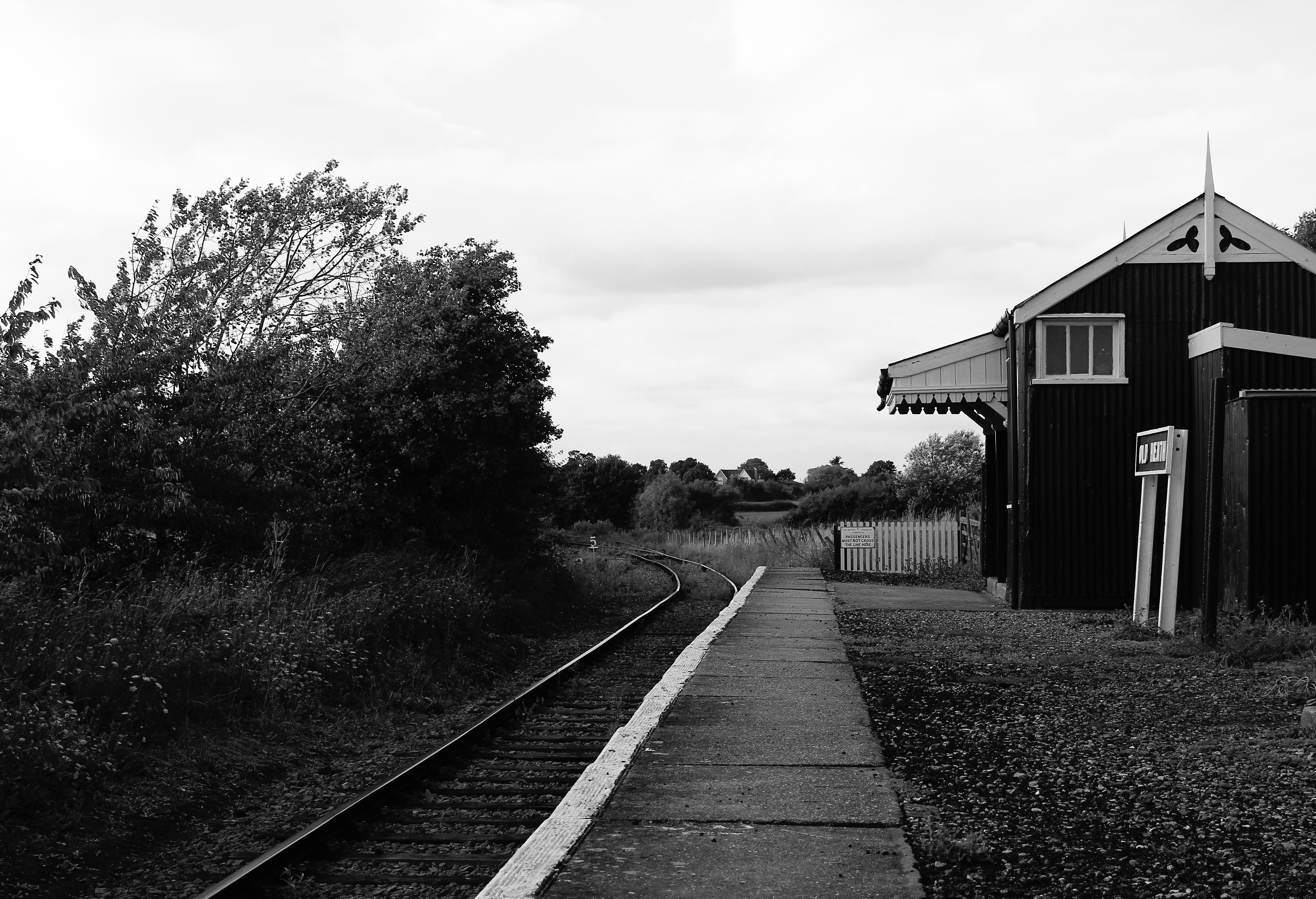
- Old Heath Station (Formerly Laxfield on the Mid Suffolk Light Railway).

- Location within Essex
- Established: 1986
- Location: Burnham-on-Crouch, Essex, England
- Coordinates: 51°38′49″N 0°48′30″E
- Type: Railway museum
- CEO: John Jolly
- Website: www.mangapps.co.uk

Mangapps Railway Museum (previously Mangapps Farm Railway Museum) is a heritage railway centre located near Burnham-on-Crouch in Essex, England. The 0.75 miles (1.2 km) of standard gauge running line and museum are owned and operated by the Jolly family assisted by volunteers.

== History ==
John Jolly, his wife June and their son James moved from Halesworth in Suffolk to Mangapps Farm near Burnham-on-Crouch in 1984. He already had a large collection of railwayana, and shortly after moving, was asked if he still wanted Brampton waiting shelter, which he had tried to obtain while in Halesworth. It arrived some months later, was set up in his garden and filled with railway artefacts. He built a wooden platform and installed some station furniture. Visitors started to arrive, and suggested that Jolly should hold open days for the public. With the government suggesting that farmers should diversify to generate additional income, he enquired whether the railwayana could meet their requirements. He then obtained an ex-British Railways class 04 diesel shunter, and decided he needed track and other stock to go with it. The shunter arrived on site in April 1987, and over the next two years he obtained two more buildings from the Mid-Suffolk Light Railway, forming the basis for an operational railway.

In 1989 Richard Moore, who owned a half share in Bagnall 0-6-0 saddle tank No. 3061 was looking for a new home for the locomotive, and it moved to Mangapps. Jolly was then approached by John Wilson, the area manager for British Rail at Liverpool Street station, to take part in celebrations to mark the centenary of the Great Eastern Railway’s New Essex Lines network. Rover tickets from Southend Victoria railway station could be bought for £1, and Wilson wanted him to organise a bus link between Burnham-on-Crouch and the farm. Jolly obtained two buses, while Wilson supplied three more, and over 3000 visitors used them over the August Bank Holiday weekend. The event highlighted the need to offer train rides, and after consultation with Major Peter Olver from the Railway Inspectorate, the running line was extended and train rides were offered from Easter 1990. Since then the collection of rolling stock and artefacts has continued to expand.

The collection includes many items with an East Anglian connection, as well as railway signalling and goods wagons. In addition to the locomotives, there are several coaches including a pantry car built for the London and North Eastern Railway in 1928 and a 1956-built non-corridor coach from the Western Region. Wagons include a boxvan built in 1881 for the Great Eastern Railway, an SNCF ferry van built in 1932 and a fruit van built for British Railways in 1950. Among the eight brakevans on the site is a caboose van built in 1981 for the Canadian Pacific Railway. There is also a vast array of historical signage, badges, and other memorabilia.

== Museum collection ==
The museum's collection of rolling stock, in common with most preserved railways stock, may be loaned to other railways from time to time.

=== Steam locomotives ===
Builder	Wheel arrangement	Class	Built	Number and name	Status	Photograph
Fox, Walker and Company	0-6-0ST		1878	358 Minnie	On static display.	
Peckett and Sons	0-4-0ST		1908	1159 Annie	Undergoing restoration.	
Andrew Barclay Sons & Co.	0-4-0ST		1919	1619 Toto	Undergoing restoration.	
W. G. Bagnall	0-6-0PT		1940	2613 Brookfield	Acquired 1993. Designed for a metre gauge railway in Turkey, but completed as standard gauge for the UK. Operational, following a major overhall completed in 2024.	

W.G. Bagnall 0-6-0ST Empress, the first steam locomotive to arrive at Mangapps in 1989, moved permanently to the Pontypool and Blaenavon Railway in September 2018.

=== Diesel locomotives ===
Origin	Wheel arrangement	Class	Number and name	Year	Status	Photograph
British Rail Swindon	0-6-0DM	Class 03	03 018 (ex D2018)	1958	Under overhaul.	
British Rail Doncaster	0-6-0DM	Class 03	03 081 Lucie (ex D2081)	1960	Repatriated from Belgium in 2004. Undergoing repaint into BR Green.	
British Rail Doncaster	0-6-0DM	Class 03	03 089 (ex D2089)	1960	Operational.	
British Rail	0-6-0 DM	Class 03	03 158	1960	Operational.	
British Rail Doncaster	0-6-0DM	Class 03	03 399 (ex D2399)	1961	Operational.	
British Rail; Vulcan Foundry for Drewry Car Co.	0-6-0DM	Adams Newport	Works number 2252 (Liveried 11104)	1948	On Static Display. Cosmetically restored to look like a Wisbech and Upwell Tramway locomotive.	
British Rail	0-6-0DM	Class 04	11103	1952	Under restoration to condition as used on the Wisbech and Upwell Tramway with cowcatchers and skirts.	
British Rail; Robert Stephenson & Hawthorns, Darlington for Drewry Car Co	0-6-0DM	Class 04	D2325	1961	Operational. (First locomotive to arrive on site in April 1987)	
British Rail	A1A-A1A	Class 31	31 105 "Radio Caroline" (named by Rick Wakeman in October 2023)	1959	Operational.(functional GSM-R radio but unnecessary for a heritage railway)	
British Rail	A1A-A1A	Class 31	31 233 EX network rail viechle used on PLPR and UTU trains with network rail MK2F coaches (sometimes a DBSO was used)	1960	Operational (functional GSM-R radio but unnecessary for a heritage railway)	

=== Diesel multiple units ===
Origin	Wheel arrangement	Class	Notes	Year	Photograph
British Rail; Pressed Steel, Linwood		Class 117	DMS no. W51381 (ex-unit 117 310)	1960	

=== Electric multiple units ===
Origin	Wheel arrangement	Class	Notes	Year	Photograph
British Rail		Class 302	BDTSO No. 75033 (ex-unit 302 201 Brake, Driving Trailer, Standard class, Open seating)	1958	
British Rail		Class 302	BDTSO No. 75250 (ex-unit 302 227 Brake, Driving Trailer, Standard class, Open seating)	1960	
London Underground		1959 Stock	Driving Motor no. 1030 (used in the film Darkest Hour in 2017) This was once part of London Underground's painted 'Heritage' train.	1959	
London Underground		1959 Stock	Trailer no. 2044. This was once part of London Underground's painted 'Heritage' train.	1959	
London Underground		R38 Stock	Driving Motor no. 22624 (on static display). This was originally Q38 Trailer no. 014178, but was converted in 1950.	1938	

=== Inspection vehicles ===
Origin	Wheel arrangement	Class	Notes	Year	Photograph
Woodings Railcar Co No. 466	4w	Canadian Pacific Railway	Inspection Car 3700-84, last based at Abbotsford, British Columbia	c1980	
Wickham trolley	4w	British Rail Western Region	Type 4b trolley A14W-PWM2786, last based at Barmouth	1965	
Wickham trolley No. 6936	4w	British Rail Western Region	Type 27A Mk III trolley PWM3951	1955	

In addition to standard gauge stock, the museum also has a service vehicle from Southend Pier Railway. It was built as a passenger car in 1949 by AC Cars of Thames Ditton when the railway was a 3 ft 6 in (1,067 mm) gauge electric line, but was converted to become a service vehicle subsequently. It carried the number 8 when on the pier.
