= British Rail Class D1/3 =

Class of two 165hp shunting locomotives

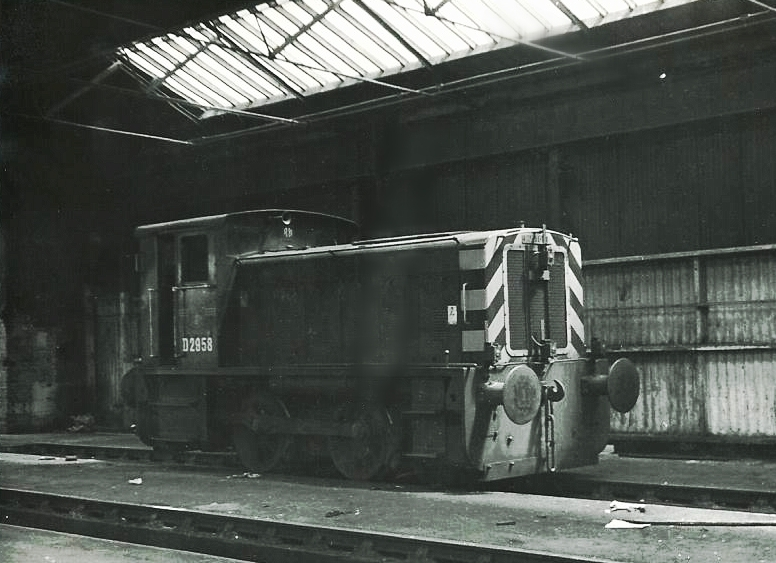
- No. D2958 in BR green livery at Stratford MPD
Type and origin
- Power type: Diesel-mechanical
- Builder: Ruston & Hornsby
- Serial number: 390774, 390777
- Build date: 1956
- Total produced: 2
Specifications
- Configuration
  - Whyte: 0-4-0 DM
  - UIC: B
- Gauge: 4 ft 8 1/2 in (1,435 mm) standard gauge
- Wheel diameter: 3 ft 4 in (1.016 m)
- Loco weight: 28.00 long tons (28.45 t; 31.36 short tons)
- Prime mover: Ruston 6VPHL
- Transmission: Mechanical, Ruston gearbox
- MU working: Not fitted
- Train heating: None
- Train brakes: None
Performance figures
- Maximum speed: 15 mph (24 km/h)
- Power output: Engine: 165 bhp (123 kW)
- Tractive effort: 14,350 lbf (63.8 kN)
Career
- Operators: British Railways
- Class: DY5, later D1/3, later 1/16. No TOPS class.
- Numbers: 11507, 11508; D2957, D2958 from 1958
- Axle load class: Route availability 3
- Retired: 1967–1968
- Disposition: One sold for industrial use, both scrapped.

British Rail Class D1/3 (formerly DY5) was a locomotive class commissioned by British Rail in England. It was a diesel powered locomotive in the pre-TOPS period built by Ruston & Hornsby at their Iron Works in Lincoln. In appearance, it was similar to British Rail Class 97/6, but with an 0-4-0 wheel arrangement.

D2958 was later sold for use at C.F. Booth Ltd., Rotherham.

== Allocations ==
=== D2957 ===
Delivered as 11507, renumbered April 1958. Delivered to Immingham Shed in March 1956, moved to Stratford Shed in January 1957. It was then moved to Goole Shed in August 1966 but stored at Hull Dairycoates. It was withdrawn in March 1967 and moved to Slag Reduction, Ickles, Rotherham for scrap in June and was cut up by August.

=== D2958 ===
Delivered as 11508, renumbered March 1958. Delivered to Immingham Shed in May 1956, moved to Stratford Shed in December 1956. It was withdrawn in January 1968 when it was sold to C.F. Booth in Rotherham, moving there in May 1968. It continued in use at the companies South Yorkshire yard until 1981 when it was taken out of use; it was scrapped in October 1984.

== See also ==
- List of British Rail classes

== Sources ==
- Ian Allan ABC of British Railways Locomotives (Winter 1962/3 ed.). p. 204.
