= British Rail Class 97/6 =

British diesel locomotive

British Rail class 97/6
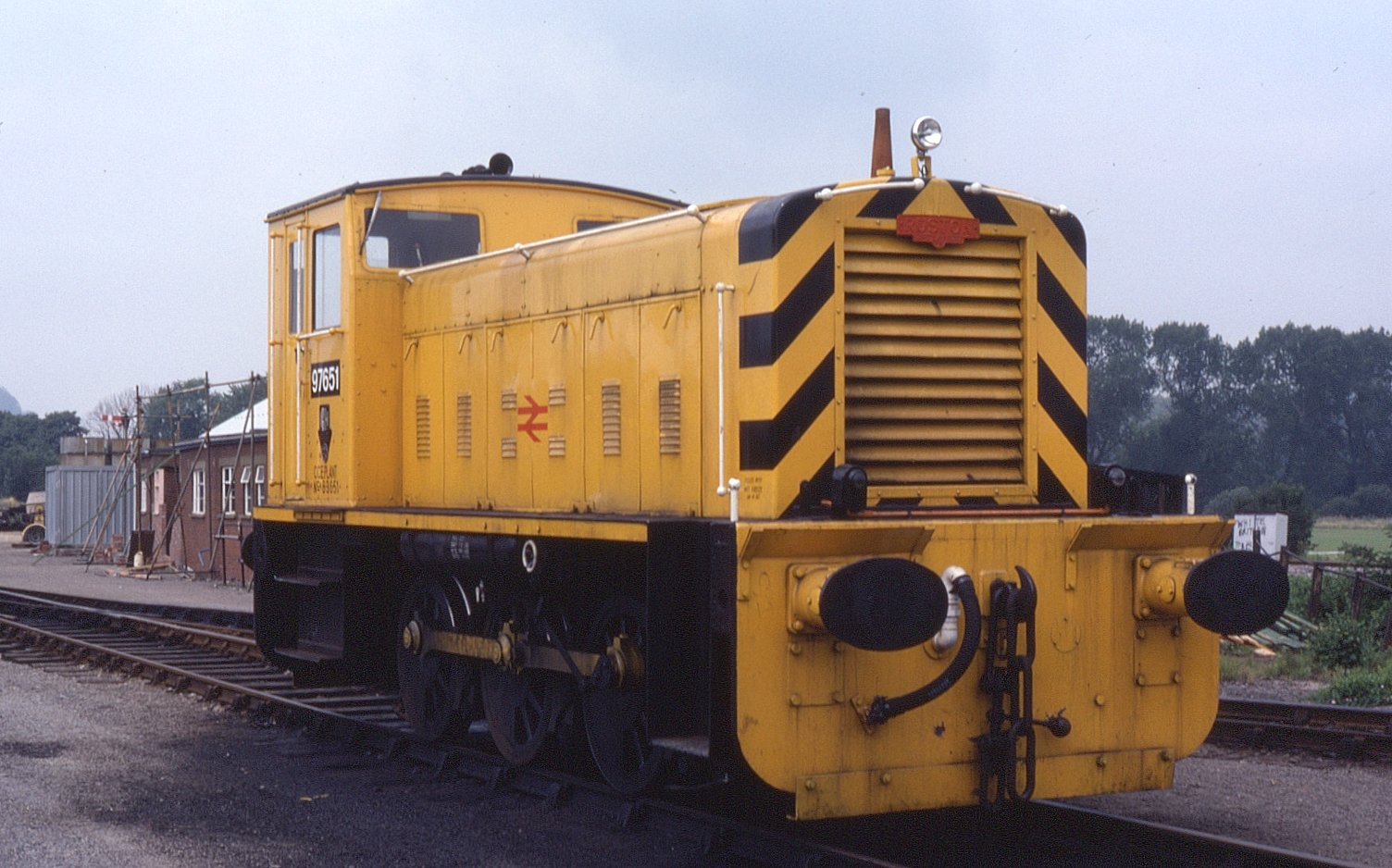
- 97651 at Radyr in 1982
Type and origin
- Power type: Diesel-electric
- Builder: Ruston & Hornsby
- Serial number: 312990, 431758–431761
- Build date: 1953 (650), 1959 (651-654)
- Total produced: 5
Specifications
- Configuration
  - Whyte: 0-6-0DE
  - UIC: C
- Gauge: 4 ft 8 1/2 in (1,435 mm) standard gauge
- Wheel diameter: 97650: 3 ft 2 1/2 in (0.978 m); 97651-97654: 3 ft 4 in (1.016 m)
- Length: 24 ft 8 1/2 in (7.53 m)
- Width: 8 ft 6 in (2.59 m)
- Height: 11 ft 0 in (3.35 m)
- Loco weight: 97650: 28 long tons (28 t; 31 short tons); 97651-97654: 30 long tons (30 t)
- Prime mover: Ruston 6VPHL
- RPM range: 1,250 rpm (max)
- Generator: BTH RTB6034
- Traction motors: BTH RTA5041 (nose-suspended), 1 off
- Loco brake: Straight air
- Train brakes: 97650: none, later vacuum 97651–97654: vacuum
Performance figures
- Maximum speed: 20 mph (32 km/h)
- Power output: 165 hp (123 kW)
- Tractive effort: 17,000 lbf (75.6 kN)
Career
- Operators: British Railways’ Western Region Chief Civil Engineer's department
- Numbers: PWM 650–654 later 97650–97654
- Axle load class: RA 1
- Disposition: 3 preserved, 2 scrapped

The British Rail Class 97/6 0-6-0 diesel shunting locomotives were purpose-built for departmental duties by Ruston & Hornsby at Lincoln in 1953 (97650) or 1959 (97651-654). There are minor technical differences between 97650 and the 1959 batch.

This class of five locomotives is outwardly similar to the Class 04 diesels built around the same time, but internally they are quite different. The Class 97/6 is diesel-electric, while the Class 04 is diesel-mechanical.

The Class 97/6 is related to the older British Rail Class D1/3, which was a 0-4-0 diesel-mechanical version of the Ruston & Hornsby 165DE.

== Overview ==
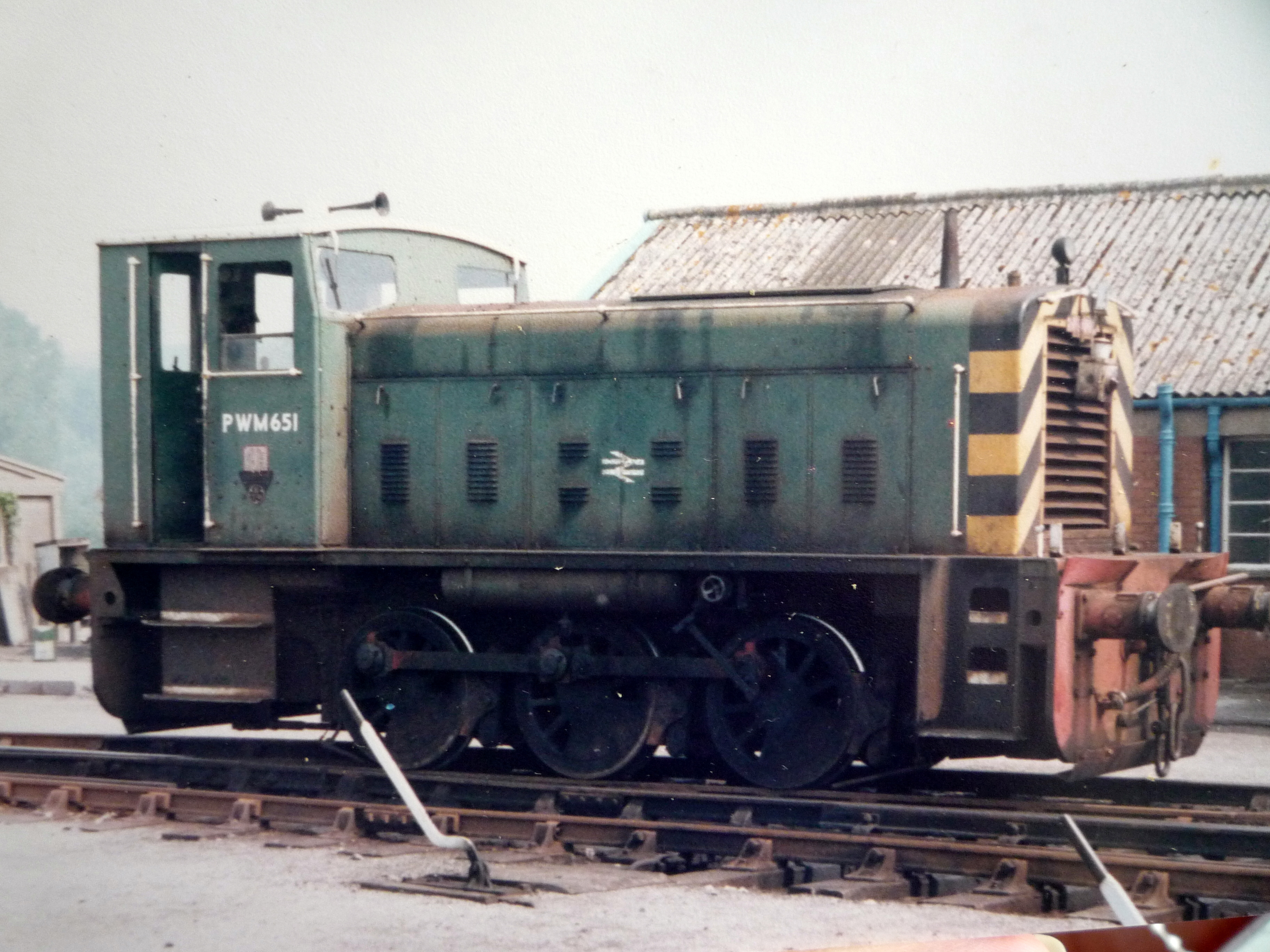
PWM651 at Radyr, c. 1977.

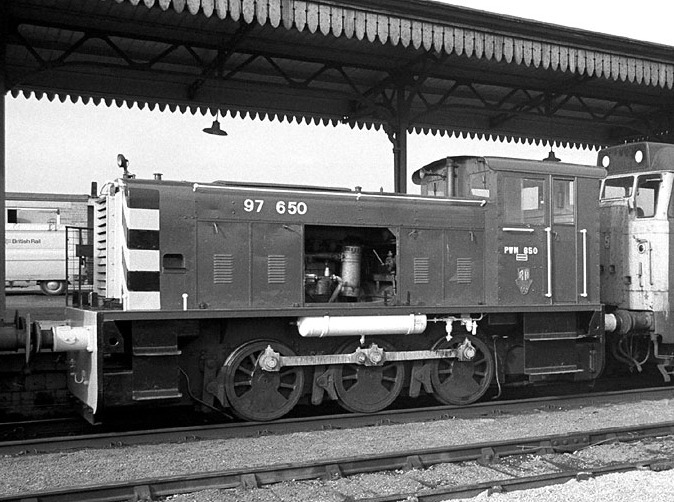
97650 at Worcester Shrub Hill in 1979 - this loco was different from the others.

The fleet was originally numbered PWM650-654 in the Western Region Permanent Way Machines series, hence were commonly referred to as the “PWM shunters” or simply “PWMs”. Between 1979 and 1981 they were renumbered as Class 97 locomotives. Originally painted in BR Green livery, this was later superseded by BR Blue and finally Civil Engineering Yellow. They were employed at various locations, including Reading West (97650/653/654), Gloucester / Cardiff Canton / Radyr (97651) and Plymouth Laira (97652).

== Specification ==
- Diesel engine: Ruston 6VPH of 165 bhp (123 kW) at 1,250 rpm
- Transmission: Electric,
  - Main generator: 1 x British Thomson-Houston RTB6034
  - Traction motor: 1 x British Thomson-Houston RTA5041 (nose-suspended)
- Driving wheel diameter,
  - 97650: 3 ft 2½in (978 mm)
  - 97651-654: 3 ft 4in (1,016 mm)
- Weight,
  - 97650: 28 tons (29 tonnes)
  - 97651-654: 30 tons (31 tonnes)
- Maximum tractive effort: 17,000 lb (75 kN)
- Maximum speed: 20 mph (32 km/h)
- Brake type: Straight air on locomotive, automatic vacuum for train

A notable feature of this class is that the electric traction motor can be disengaged from the wheels. This allows the locomotive to be hauled by another locomotive at speeds above 20 mph.

== Withdrawal ==
With the privatisation of British Rail in the mid-1990s, these locomotives were largely made redundant. Three locomotives had already been withdrawn from traffic, and only nos. 97651 and 97654 survived long enough to pass into English Welsh & Scottish (EWS) ownership. Number 97654 was sold to an infrastructure company based in Edinburgh, and remained in use until 2005, when it was preserved. Number 97651 was one of the first locomotives sold by EWS into preservation.

== Preservation ==
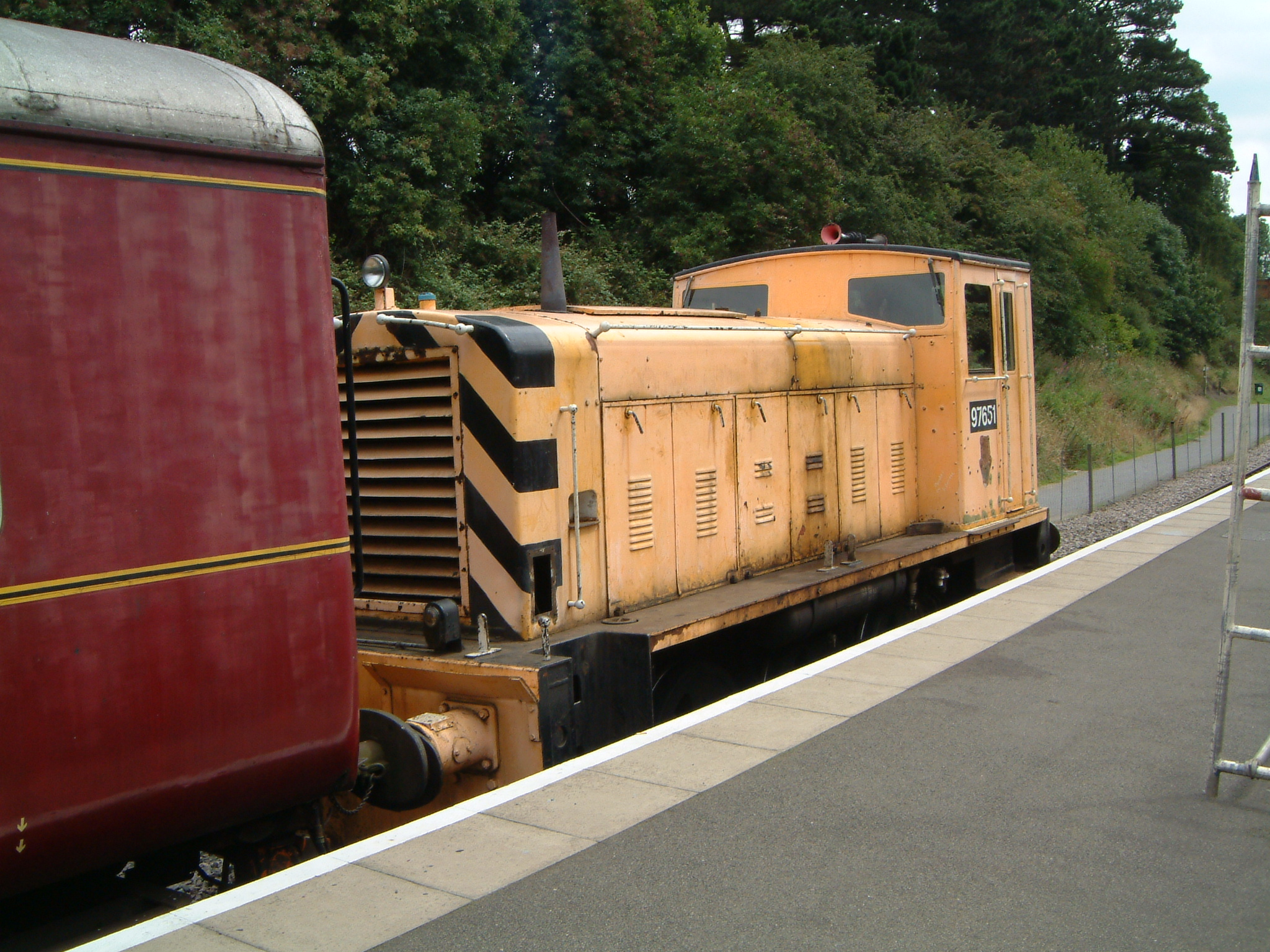
97651 as preserved.

Three of the five locomotives have been preserved on heritage railways.

- 97650 - Lincolnshire Wolds Railway
- 97651 - Swindon and Cricklade Railway
- 97654 - Heritage Shunters Trust

Incomplete remains of 97653 were stored at the former Ministry of Defence depot at Long Marston, Warwickshire until taken to Hurst's, Andover for scrap in August 2011.

== Fleet details ==
Key:	Preserved	Scrapped

Number(s)		Built	Final livery	Withdrawn	Disposal	Notes
97650	PWM650	1953	BR Blue	1987	Preserved	
97651	PWM651	1959	CE Yellow	1996	Preserved - Swindon and Cricklade Railway	
97652	PWM652	1959	CE Yellow	1987	Scrapped (1990)	
97653	PWM653	1959	CE Yellow	1993	Scrapped (2011)	
97654	PWM654	1959	CE Yellow	2005	Preserved	

== Sources ==
- ABC British Railways Locomotives: Combined Volume, Winter 1962/3. London: Ian Allan. 1962. p. 238. ISBN 0711014361.
- Greaves, Simon; Greengrass, Robert, eds. (1998). Locomotive Datafile. Metro Enterprises. p. 99. ISBN 094777310X.
