= British Rail Class 03 =

Class of 230 204hp diesel-mechanical shunting locomotives

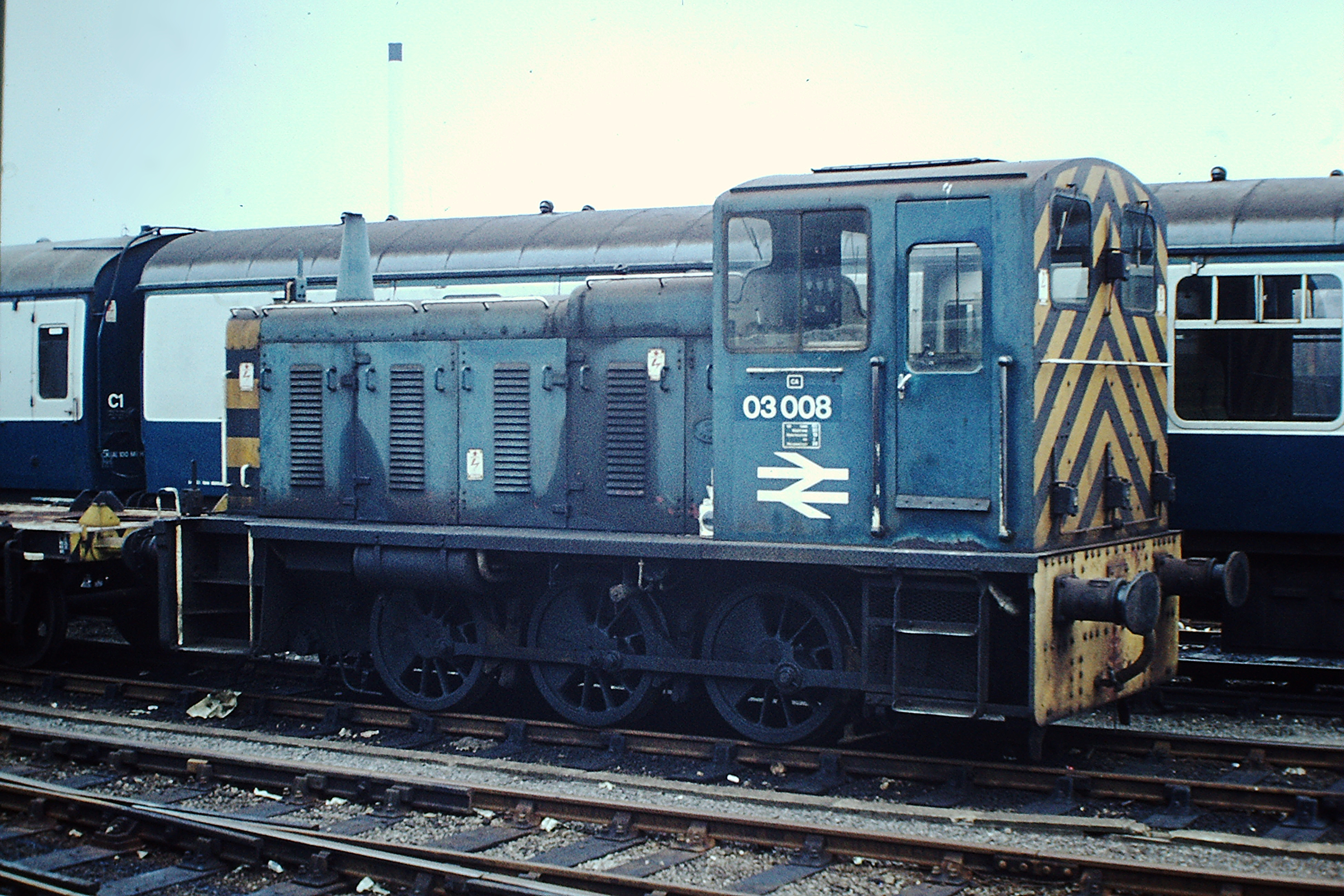
- 03008 at Cambridge station in 1975
Type and origin
- Power type: Diesel-mechanical
- Builder: British Railways; Doncaster & Swindon
- Build date: 1957–1961
- Total produced: 230
Specifications
- Configuration
  - Whyte: 0-6-0DM
  - UIC: C
- Gauge: 4 ft 8 1/2 in (1,435 mm)
- Wheel diameter: 3 ft 7 in (1.092 m)
- Minimum curve: 2 chains (40.23 m)
- Wheelbase: 9 ft 0 in (2.743 m)
- Length: 26 ft 0 in (7.92 m)
- Width: 8 ft 6 in (2.591 m)
- Height: 12 ft 2 7/16 in (3.72 m); 11 ft 10 in (3.61 m) (cut down)
- Loco weight: 30.2 long tons (30.7 t; 33.8 short tons)
- Fuel capacity: 300 imp gal (1,400 L; 360 US gal)
- Prime mover: Gardner 8L3
- RPM
  - Maximum RPM: 1200 rpm
- Transmission: Wilson-Drewry CA5 R7, 5-speed epicyclic gearbox, RF11 spiral bevel reverse and final drive unit.
- Train heating: None
- Train brakes: Vacuum (some Dual Air & Vacuum)
Performance figures
- Maximum speed: 28.5 mph (45.9 km/h)
- Power output: Engine: 204 hp (152 kW); At rail: 152 hp (113 kW)
- Tractive effort: Max: 15,300 lbf (68.1 kN)
- Brakeforce: 13 long tons-force (130 kN)
Career
- Operators: British Railways; First Capital Connect
- Numbers: 11187–11209, 91, 92; later D2000–D2199, D2370–D2399; later 03004–03199, 03370–03399
- Axle load class: RA 1
- Retired: April 1968–1993, 2008
- Disposition: 56 preserved, remainder scrapped

The British Rail Class 03 locomotive was, together with the similar Class 04, one of British Railways' most successful 0-6-0 diesel-mechanical shunters. 230 were built at Doncaster and Swindon works between 1957 and 1962, and were numbered D2000–D2199 and D2370–D2399 (later 03004 to 03399). D2370 and D2371 were used as departmental locomotives and originally numbered 91 and 92 respectively.

== Overview ==
The fleet of 230 locomotives entered service between December 1957 and June 1962. Like other shunters of this size, the Class 03 was built for light duties where a larger locomotive was not needed, especially for shunting at locomotive and carriage depots and as station pilots, or where larger or heavier locomotives could not be used. The reduction over time in the demand for shunting locomotives meant that they were progressively withdrawn from 1968 onwards, many being sold to private industry, including three that were exported to Belgium. However, some remained in service much longer, with two examples on the Isle of Wight lasting until 1993. Mainland examples had gone by 1989, the last being those allocated to Birkenhead North TMD, for use on the Birkenhead Dock Branch.

In 1998, one of the Isle of Wight locomotives, 03179, was reinstated by the West Anglia Great Northern for service at Hornsey depot. It was named Clive after a depot employee. It was not fitted with TPWS equipment and thus confined to the depot from 2002. It was operated subsequently by First Capital Connect until withdrawal in 2008. In 2016 it was sold by Govia Thameslink Railway to the Rushden, Higham and Wellingborough Railway.

== Technical details ==
The engine is a Gardner 8-cylinder, 4-stroke 8L3 of 204 hp (152 kW) connected to a Wilson-Drewry CA5 R7, 5-speed epicyclic gearbox with RF11 spiral bevel reverse and final-drive unit. Drive is through a jackshaft mounted beneath the cab, driving the wheels through coupling rods.

During their later life, some locomotives were fitted with dual (air and vacuum) brakes. These were 03059, 03063, 03066, 03073, 03078, 03084, 03086, 03089, 03094, 03112, 03152, 03158, 03162, 03170, 03179, 03180, 03196, 03197, 03371, 03397 and 03399.

== Operation ==
=== Shunting ===
Originally the Class 03s were often deployed where their attributes of short wheelbase and light weight enabled them to operate where other shunters could not. On lines such as that to Ipswich docks, bridge weight restrictions prevented the ubiquitous Class 08s from operating. Another common use was as station pilot, usually coupled to a shunters' truck to ensure operation of track circuits which did not always register the passage of the 03 due to its short wheelbase.

By 1979, the Class 03's operations included:

- Depot pilot duties at Hull Botanic Gardens DMU depot and Bradford Hammerton Street DMU depot
- Ipswich Docks, King's Lynn Docks, and Poplar Dock
- Freight trips along the Team Valley branch (Gateshead) and the Gwendraeth Valley line
- Shunting duties at Boston Yard, Ipswich Upper and Lower yards, Lincoln engineers' yard, and Tweedmouth yard near Berwick-upon-Tweed
- Spare loco on standby at Boston and Kings Lynn
- Motive power on the Kirkley goods branch line in Lowestoft
- Station pilot duties at Bradford Exchange, Hull Paragon, Ipswich, Newcastle Central, Norwich Thorpe, and Sunderland

=== Passenger duties ===
Despite the limited scope for the use of such a small locomotive on main line passenger duties, there were a number of duties rostered to the class. During the early 1970s Southern Region Class 03s worked Channel Islands boat trains through the streets to the harbour along the Weymouth Harbour Tramway, displacing the last of the 1366 Class 0-6-0 pannier tanks. In 1980, a Class 03 at Ipswich was booked to shunt the 23:20 Peterborough – Liverpool Street onto the rear of the 23:45 Norwich – Liverpool Street. Also, according to Mangapps Railway Museum, 03089 once hauled a Blackpool North to Scarborough express along the York to Scarborough Line from Malton to Scarborough.

=== Burry Port & Gwendraeth Valley Line ===
Several examples were rebuilt with cut-down cabs for working on the Burry Port & Gwendraeth Valley Line, as there were several low bridges on the line that precluded the use of normal height locomotives.

The modified examples were nos. 03119, 03120, 03141, 03142, 03144, 03145, 03151, 03152 and late addition (ex-Bristol) 03382. Their duties included shunting (for example at Burry Port), and hauling full coal trains down from the valley's pits. For this latter duty they sometimes worked triple-headed.

They were replaced by Class 08/9 locomotives, which were also rebuilt to a reduced height. Several cut-down locomotives have been preserved.

The Isle of Wight shunters, nos. 03079 and 03179, were also rebuilt with cut-down cabs, to enable them to pass through a low tunnel in Ryde.

== Preservation ==
Fifty-six members of the class survive in preservation.

Loco numbers in bold mean their current number.

TOPS Number	Pre-TOPS	Original Number Allocated	Image	Preserved location	Industrial use	Notes
03018	**D2018**	11205		Mangapps Railway Museum	Cohen's scrapyard, Cransley, Kettering until 20 September 1980 and Cohen's scrapyard Willesden from 28 March 1981. Then to 600 Ferrous Fragmentisers Ltd., Willesden.	
03020	D2020	11207		Lavender Line	A. King & Sons (Metal Merchants), Knappetts Scrapyard, Newmarket	
03022	**D2022**	11209		Swindon and Cricklade Railway	-	
-	**D2023**			Kent & East Sussex Railway	Tees & Hartlepool Dock Authority (1972–1980)	
-	**D2024**			Kent & East Sussex Railway	Tees & Hartlepool Dock Authority (1972–1980)	
**03027**	D2027			Heritage Shunters Trust	Shipbreakers (Queenborough) Ltd., Queenborough Wharf Scrapyard	
03037	D2037			Royal Deeside Railway	NCB, British Oak Disposal Point	
-	**D2041**			Colne Valley Railway	Richborough Power Station (1970); Rye House Power Station (1971); Barking Power Station (1971); Rye House Power Station (1974–1981)	
-	D2051			North Norfolk Railway	Ford Dagenham (06/1973-04/1997)	
03059	**D2059**			Isle of Wight Steam Railway	Used as a general purpose shunter, and also to supplement any locomotive that has broken down. D2059 arrived on the Island during the electrification works to the Island Line, and remained in use by British Rail at Ryde Traincare Depot until 1988, when it was transferred to the Isle of Wight Steam Railway. D2059 is affectionately nicknamed Edward by the Isle of Wight Steam Railway's staff.	
03062	**D2062**			East Lancashire Railway	-	
03063	**D2063**			Mid-Norfolk Railway	03063 was released from Doncaster Work on 14 July 1959 originally as D2063, under Pre-TOPS, and was allocated to the York North (50A). The locomotive was then bequeathed to the Mid-Norfolk Railway in 2023 upon the passing of its owner, the late Paul Mobbs. It was moved to the MNR in November 2023.	
**03066**	D2066			Barrow Hill Engine Shed	-	
03069	**D2069**			Vale of Berkeley Railway, Gloucestershire.	Vic Berry, Leicester, even worked at Vic Berry's Scrapyard until being sold into preservation in 1991.	
**03072**	D2072			Lakeside & Haverthwaite Railway	-	
03073	**D2073**			Crewe Heritage Centre	Used for occasional loco shunting and brakevan rides to visitors to the heritage centre	(Note: 03073 was allocated to Birkenhead North and used on the Birkenhead Dock Branch, prior to withdrawal on 23 May 1989.)
**03078**	D2078		Class 03 No.03078	North Tyneside Steam Railway	Newcastle Central Station, used as a station pilot.	
**03079**	D2079			Derwent Valley Light Railway	Worked at Gateshead before moving to the Isle of Wight along with 03179. This loco has a cut-down cab owing to the low tunnels at Ryde, withdrawn 1996.	
**03081**	D2081			Mangapps Railway Museum		
**03084**	D2084			West Coast Railways, Carnforth	Sold by the Lincolnshire Wolds Railway in 2010 or 2011.	
**03089**	D2089			Mangapps Railway Museum		
**03090**	D2090			Locomotion	Part of the National Collection	
03094	**D2094**			Royal Deeside Railway	Previously at Llynclys Cambrian Heritage Railway, near Oswestry	
**03099**	D2099			Heritage Shunters Trust	NCB, Monkton Coking Plant	
03112	**D2112**			Rother Valley Railway	-	
**03113**	D2113			Heritage Shunters Trust	D2113 spent its entire B.R. life at York (50A), it was sold to Gulf Oil at Milford Haven upon withdrawal from BR service in August 1975 as 03113. For a number of years, after becoming surplus to the Gulf Refinery, it was placed on display, along with a four-wheel petroleum wagon, in Milford Haven Harbour. It is now preserved by the Heritage Shunters Trust at Rowsley in Derbyshire, entering service following full restoration during 2011.	Number 8
-	**D2117**			Lakeside & Haverthwaite Railway		
-	**D2118**			Great Central Railway (Nottingham)	Worked at Anglian Building Products, Lenwade, Norfolk from August 1973, then at Dow-Mac near Stamford from December 1993.	
**03119**	D2119			Epping Ongar Railway		
-	**D2120**			Fawley Hill Railway, Buckinghamshire		
03901	D2128			Somerset and Dorset Railway at Midsomer Norton	Sold for scrap to Birds, Long Marston, where engine and coupling removed and then exported to Belgium where fitted with Deutz V12 air-cooled engine, VM hydraulic pump and motor into original change speed box. Repatriated and operated at Peak Rail, eventually to Dean Forest where stored incomplete. Moved to Scunthorpe 2009, where repowered with Cummins 14 litre engine, hydraulic transmission and renumbered 03 901 to reflect this	
-	**D2133**			West Somerset Railway	Worked at Cellophane's Bridgwater factory in the 1970s, prior to preservation at the time.	
-	D2134			Royal Deeside Railway	Was based in Belgium between 1976 and 1993, has since been repatriated back to the UK.	
-	**D2138**			Midland Heritage Railway	Used at Pye Hill Colliery between 1969 and 1984, prior to preservation.	
-	**D2139**			Heritage Shunters Trust	NCB, Coed Ely Coking Plant	
**03141**	D2141			Pontypool and Blaenavon Railway		
**03144**	D2144			Wensleydale Railway		
**03145**	D2145			D2578 Locomotive Group, Moreton Business Park		
-	**D2148**			Ribble Steam Railway	NCB, Bowers Row Disposal Point	
-	**D2152**			Swindon & Cricklade Railway		Cut-down cab variant
03158	**D2158**			Mangapps Railway Museum		
**03162**	D2162			Llangollen Railway		(Note: In 1983, 03162 was a replacement for 03196 at Birkenhead. 03162 was allocated to Birkenhead North, prior to withdrawal on 23 May 1989. The locomotive has a non-standard cone chimney and vertical air horn. Named Birkenhead South 1879-1985 and repainted in BR green livery on 8 January 1987.)
03170	**D2170**			Epping Ongar Railway	Was owned by Otis Euro Transrail between 1989-1999 and then latterly was present on the Battlefield Line	(Note: 03170 was used on the Birkenhead Dock Branch prior to withdrawal in March 1989.)
-	**D2178**			Gwili Railway	NCB, Coed Ely Coking Plant	
**03179**	D2179			Rushden, Higham and Wellingborough Railway	Worked on the Isle of Wight along with 03079. This loco (03179 Clive) has a cut-down cab owing to the low tunnels at Ryde. This engine was the last 03 to work for a main-line company, before being preserved. Also notable was its naming ceremony at London Kings Cross.	
-	D2180			Battlefield Line		
-	**D2182**			Gloucestershire Warwickshire Railway		
-	**D2184**			Colne Valley Railway	NCB, Southend Coal Concentration Depot	
**03189**	D2189			Ribble Steam Railway		
03192	**D2192**			Dartmouth Steam Railway		
**03196**	D2196			West Coast Railways, Carnforth		(Note: 03196 was used at Birkenhead prior to withdrawal. The locomotive was sold to a private buyer, then moved to Carnforth on 15 June 1983, having been replaced at Birkenhead by 03162.)
**03197**	D2197			Mid-Norfolk Railway	Was previously at the Mid-Norfolk Railway to help build the new Kimberley Ballast Pit Sidings. Moved to Mangapps Railway Museum in August 2019 however, moved back to the Mid-Norfolk Railway in February 2020.	
-	**D2199**			Heritage Shunters Trust	Sold to National Coal Board in 1974 after being overhauled and fitted with air brakes at Doncaster Works. Worked at Rockingham, North Gawber and Royston until being placed into store at Monkton in 1984. Was on hire to Eurotunnel as Cheriton Depot shunter 8/4/97.Was on loan to Hanson Aggregates, Machen Quarry near Newport 2003 (?)-2006	
**03371**	D2371	Departmental 92		Dartmouth Steam Railway		
-	**D2381**			West Coast Railways, Carnforth		
**03399**	D2399			Mangapps Railway Museum		

== Scale Models ==
Mainline Railways and Replica each offered OO gauge models. Mainline Railways introduced their OO gauge Class 03s in 1983; one in BR green and 03382 in BR blue. Mainline's original 'split-chassis' tooling later passed to Bachmann. When the company later took the decision to produce the Class 04 in its place the tooling was altered, retaining the split chassis power arrangement. However, Bachmann later announced that they would be producing a totally new Class 03 in OO gauge, which was introduced in 2010. In early 2011, Modelzone released special edition examples of the Isle of Wight prototypes, which were produced by Bachmann.

Graham Farish currently offers a British N gauge model. Past models have included D2388 in BR green livery and 03066 in BR blue livery.

In 2008, Bachmann introduced O gauge brass models of the Class 03 in BR green and BR blue liveries.
