= Holyhead Lighthouse =

Holyhead Lighthouse may refer to one of two Holyhead, Wales lighthouses:

- Holyhead Breakwater Lighthouse
- Holyhead Mail Pier Light
