= Shunters' truck =

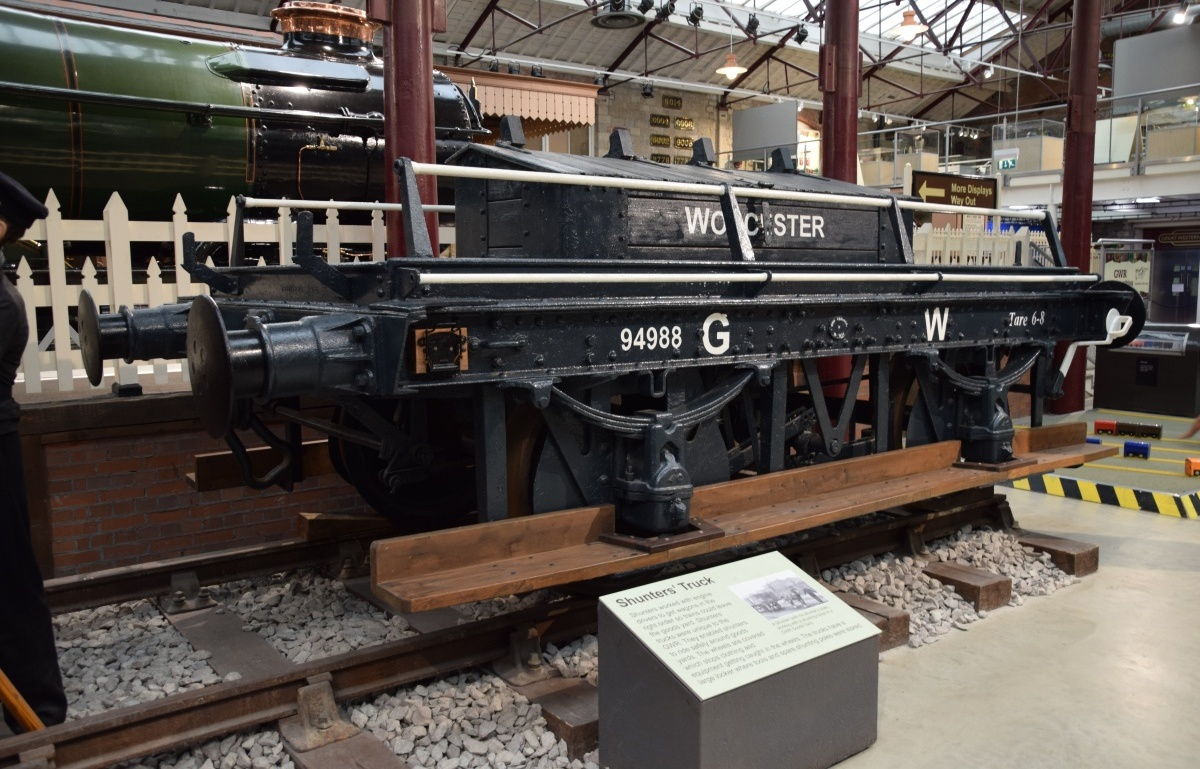
Swindon Railway Museum's Shunters Truck

Shunters' trucks were small British railway flat wagons that were used in goods yards to carry shunters and their tools. Shunting was often rather dangerous and shunters could easily be knocked over by wagons and the tools needed were heavy. The shunters' truck allowed the shunters to ride safely around larger goods yards. To help with this, the wagons were fitted with footboards and handrails along their length. On the top of the wagon were large, typically asymmetrical, lockable boxes to carry shunting poles, brake sticks, jacks, packing and long rerailing tools. The Great Western Railway was a prominent user of these trucks.
