= Heritage Shunters Trust =

British railway preservation organisation

Heritage Shunters Trust (HST) is a trading name of The South Yorkshire Railway Co. Ltd. which was founded in 1989.

== Overview ==
HST is a railway preservation society and is the only preservation society that specialises in the preservation of ex-British Railway diesel shunters in the United Kingdom, although they do have a Class 14 which is a Type 1 locomotive and not a shunter.

Most of the locomotives are kept at Rowsley, Derbyshire, England, on the site of preserved railway Peak Rail but the company is a separate outfit. Galas are usually held twice a year where the collection is put on display and brake van rides are hauled by an assortment from the active fleet. Guided tours of the collection, and the viewing of restoration work being undertaken, are available most weekends for a small charge.

== Formation and purpose ==
The Heritage Shunters Trust (HST) was established in 1989 with the primary objective of preserving and restoring British Railway diesel shunters. These locomotives, once ubiquitous in rail yards and industrial sidings, were facing an uncertain future due to the decline of traditional shunting operations.

== Diesel locomotives ==
HST has the following locomotives.

Ex-British Rail

- British Rail Class 01 No. D2953 (First diesel loco to be sold by BR into private industry & pioneer 01)
- British Rail Class 02 Nos. D2854, D2866.
- British Rail Class 03 Nos. 03027, 03037, 03099, 03113, D2139,03180, D2199
- British Rail Class 04 Nos. D2205, D2229, D2272 Alfie, D2284, D2289 (imported and repatriated from Italy), D2337 Dorothy (Includes one of each of the sub-classes of the 04 design)
- British Rail Class 05 No. D2587
- British Rail Class 06 No. 06003 (The only survivor of this class)
- British Rail Class 07 No. 07001 (Pioneer 07)
- British Rail Class 08 No. 08016 from the first batch.
- British Rail Class 09 No. 09001 (Pioneer 09)
- British Rail Class 14 No. D9525
- British Rail Class 97/6 Nos. 97650, 97654 (Includes pioneer PWM)

Industrial

- John Fowler & Co., Bigga, (built 1947, rebuilt by Thomas Hill (Rotherham) Ltd in 1960)
- Yorkshire Engine Company, BSC No.2, Rotherham (Not currently on public display)

== See also ==
- Railway enthusiasts societies in the United Kingdom
