= Professional Wealth Management =

- Editor: Yuri Bender (editor-in-chief)
- Categories: Wealth management
- Frequency: Monthly
- Total circulation: 12,750
- First issue: 2001; PWM Asia in 2008
- Company: Financial Times
- Country: United Kingdom
- Language: English
- Website: www.pwmnet.com

Professional Wealth Management (PWM) is a magazine about global wealth management. It is published by the Financial Times group.

PWM focuses on open and guided architecture and distribution of third party products by institutions across Europe. It also covers sub-advisory business matters.

It also has a dedicated online section called PWM Asia which focuses on the latest developments in the Asian wealth management industry.

PWM conducts the annual Global Private Banking Awards every November, with Citi Private Bank winning the overall award in 2012 and UBS Wealth Management winning the overall award in 2013.
