= British Rail Class 04 =

Class of shunting locomotives

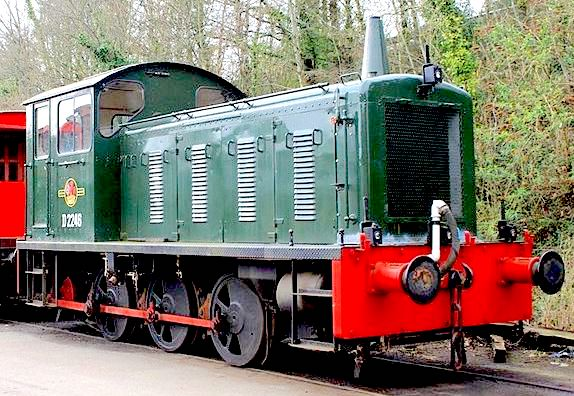
- Preserved Class 04 D2246 at Buckfastleigh on South Devon Railway in 2013.
Type and origin
- Power type: Diesel-mechanical
- Builder: Drewry Car Co., at Vulcan Foundry and Robert Stephenson and Hawthorns
- Build date: 1948 (D2341); 1952–1962 (D2200-2340)
- Total produced: 142 (for BR) + 2 (for CEGB)
Specifications
- Configuration
  - Whyte: 0-6-0DM
  - UIC: C
- Gauge: 4 ft 8 1/2 in (1,435 mm) standard gauge
- Wheel diameter: D2200–D2214: 3 ft 3 in (0.991 m); D2215–D2273: 3 ft 6 in (1.067 m); D2274–D2339: 3 ft 7 in (1.092 m)
- Minimum curve: 2 chains (130 ft; 40 m)
- Wheelbase: 9 ft 0 in (2.74 m)
- Length: 26 ft 0 1/2 in (7.94 m)
- Width: 8 ft 6 in (2.59 m)
- Height: 12 ft 1 1/2 in (3.696 m)
- Loco weight: 30.2 long tons (30.7 t; 33.8 short tons) to 32 long tons (32.5 t; 35.8 short tons)
- Fuel capacity: 225 imp gal (1,020 L; 270 US gal) to 300 imp gal (1,400 L; 360 US gal)
- Prime mover: Gardner 8L3
- Transmission: Wilson-Drewry 5 speed epicyclic gearbox
- Train heating: None
- Train brakes: Vacuum
Performance figures
- Maximum speed: 25 mph (40 km/h) to 27 mph (43 km/h)
- Power output: Engine: 204 hp (152 kW); At rail: 152 hp (113 kW)
- Tractive effort: Maximum: 15,650 lbf (69.6 kN) to 16,850 lbf (75.0 kN)
- Brakeforce: 14 long tons-force (139.5 kN)
Career
- Operators: British Railways
- Numbers: D2200–D2341
- Axle load class: D2200–D2214: RA 1 D2215–D2340: RA 2
- Withdrawn: 1967–1971
- Disposition: 20 (19 BR + 1 CEGB) preserved, remainder scrapped

The British Rail Class 04 is a 0-6-0 diesel-mechanical shunting locomotive class, built between 1952 and 1962 and was the basis for the later Class 03 built in the British Railways workshops.

== History ==
The prototype locomotive was built in 1947 and served as a departmental shunter at Hither Green depot as number DS1173, before being transferred to the capital stock list as D2341 in 1967.

The Class 04 locomotives were supplied by the Drewry Car Co., which at the time (and for most of its existence) had no manufacturing capability. Drewry sub-contracted the construction work to two builders both of whom built other locomotives under the same arrangement. Early locomotives which became D2200-41 (including DS1173) were built by Vulcan Foundry in 1952–56, and later examples D2242-2339 were built by Robert Stephenson and Hawthorns in 1956–61.

=== Design evolution ===
A clear line of development can be seen in the Class 04 from the 0-4-0DM locomotives built by Andrew Barclay and Drewry/Vulcan Foundry in the early 1940s. Similar 0-6-0DM locomotives had been built before the first Class 04, and others were built for industrial use.

The design continued to develop during the construction period, although this was generally confined to minor changes, including the diameter of the wheels.

The first batch (four engines numbered 11100-11103, later D2200-D2203) were equipped for street-running (see below).

The second batch (six engines numbered 11105-11110, later D2204-D2209) were fitted with conical exhaust stacks (the first batch initially had a plain exhaust "hole", later having a long, thin, and straight exhaust pipe added) and shaped cab front windows (instead of the rectangular windows of the first batch); these changes continued on all subsequent batches.

From the fourth batch (commencing with 11121, later D2215) the small cab side window of the earlier batches was replaced with a much larger window, the rear half of which slid open. The wheel diameter was also increased from 3 ft 3 in to 3 ft 6 in.

From locomotive D2274 onwards, the wheel diameter was again increased, from 3 ft 6 in to 3 ft 7 in. The front running plate was cut out and the steps inset to provide a safer location for a shunter riding on the locomotive; to facilitate this, the locomotive straight air brake reservoir tank was relocated underneath the centre of the running plate. This is the version depicted by the Airfix/Dapol plastic kit.

=== Use on tramways ===
The first four of these locomotives (11100-11103, later D2200-D2203) were fitted with side skirting and cowcatchers for use on the Wisbech and Upwell Tramway and on the Yarmouth Docks tramway system, since British law requires locomotives running on unfenced street trackage to be so equipped for the protection of pedestrians and animals. At least two later engines (11111/D2210 and 11113/D2212) were also fitted with cowcatchers and skirting for use on the Ipswich docks tramway system.

=== Usage ===
The class was distributed throughout the British Railways system, but the significant decline in the traffic for which they were designed resulted in a large surplus of shunting engines on the network. With this reduction in the need for shunters it was decided to standardise on the Class 03 as a light diesel-mechanical shunter and the Class 08 and 09 as larger, diesel-electric shunters, leading to the withdrawal of the class 04 engines.

== Technical details ==
=== Overview ===
Mechanically they were identical to the Class 03, with the same 24 litre Gardner engine, 5-speed epicyclic gearbox and the same overall layout. They had a straight bonnet (US: hood) from the front to the rear-mounted cab, unlike the 03s which bulged higher towards the rear (over the larger fuel tank), and the cab's rounded roof met the sides at an angle instead of with a curve as in the 03, with a lip all the way round. The internal cab layout was almost symmetrical to allow the driver to work from either side as required.

=== Drive Train ===
The engine is a Gardner 8-cyl, 4-stroke 8L3 developing 204 hp (152 kW) at 1200 rpm, connected to a Wilson-Drewry CA5 R7, 5-speed epicyclic with RF11 spiral bevel reverse and final drive unit mounted on a jackshaft. The drive to the wheels was by coupling rods from the jackshaft.

== Numbers ==
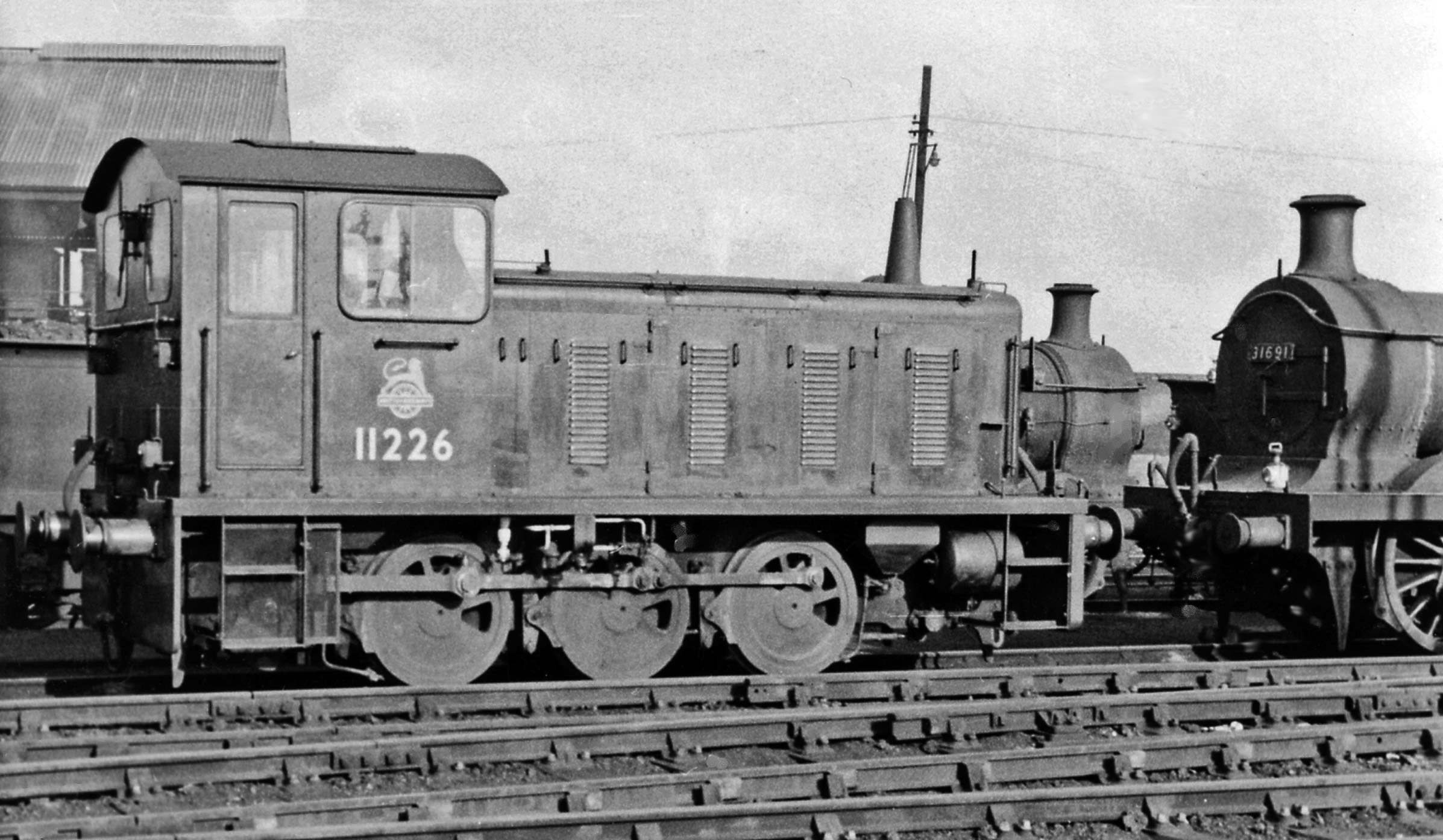
11226 at Hither Green Depot in 1960.

The prototype (of 1947) was numbered DS1173 in departmental service. The first 60 production units (from 1952) were numbered in the sequences 11100–11103, 11105–11115, 11121–11135, 11149–11160, and 11212–11229.

From 1957, new production units received numbers in the D-prefix ("Pre-TOPS") numbering series. All existing units were renumbered in the same series, sequentially from D2200 to D2259, with the new production units continuing from D2260 to D2340. Finally, the prototype locomotive left departmental service and entered the service fleet, being re-numbered as D2341; thus the oldest example of the class was allocated the last number in the numbering sequence.

== Withdrawal ==
The Class 04s were withdrawn from service earlier than the Class 03, being taken out of service between June 1967 and May 1972, with some sold for re-use by industry. Four were exported to Italy about 1972, with D2289 reported as still in service until 2012.

Table of withdrawals
Year	Quantity in service at start of year	Quantity withdrawn	Locomotive numbers
1967	142	13	D2203/07/54/63/66/73/75/88/90–92, D2303/39.
1968	129	74	D2200–02/08–09/13–14/18–22/24/26–28/30/32–36/38/40/45–46, D2250–52/55–57/59/62/68–70/81/86–87/98, D2301/04–09/11–16/18–29/31/34–38/40–41.
1969	55	28	D2204–06/15/25/29/31/37/42–43/47/53/64/67/71/74/76–77/83/85/96, D2300/02/10/17/30/32–33.
1970	27	15	D2210–12/44/48–49/58/60–61/65/72/78/82/97/99.
1971	12	12	D2216–17/23/39/41/79–80/84/89/93–95.
1972	0	0	D2217 (reinstated and withdrawn).

== Preservation ==
21 examples of the class were preserved. Of these, 20 were BR Class 04 locomotives, and 1 was of the same type, but operated privately by the CEGB. One preserved engine, D2267, was scrapped in 2003, leaving 20 in preservation, including 19 originally operated by British Rail.

Number	Image	Built	Original allocation	Current owner	Current location	Status	Notes
D2203		19/07/1952			Mangapps Railway Museum	Operational	The only surviving locomotive from the Wisbech and Upwell Tramway. Saw further use at Hemel Hempstead Lightweight Concrete Ltd.
D2205		14/03/1953	Thornaby	Heritage Shunters Trust	Rowsley South, Peak Rail	Undergoing restoration	Allocated to Middlesbrough Dock and sold to the Port Authority in 1969. Preserved at Kent and East Sussex Railway, then West Somerset Railway. Sold to the Heritage Shunters Trust in October 2012.
D2207		14/02/1953		North Yorkshire Moors Railway	North Yorkshire Moors Railway	Operational	Full overhaul completed 2018. BR Green with Wasp Stripes. Usually based at Pickering C&W.
D2229		28/11/1955		Heritage Shunters Trust	Rowsley South, Peak Rail	Stored, out of use	After sale by BR, operated by the National Coal Board at Manton Wood Colliery, Worksop.
D2245		12/11/1956	Leeds Neville Hill	Private	Derwent Valley Light Railway (York)	Operational	Previously owned by the Derwent Valley Light Railway.
D2246		06/12/1956		Devon Diesel Society	South Devon Railway	Operational	Saw further use at P.D. Fules Ltd., Crawley Coal Concentration Depot.
D2267		20/01/1958			North Norfolk Railway	Scrapped	Saw further use at Ford Motor Co. Ltd., Dagenam. Previously preserved, but scrapped at NNR around April 2003.
D2271		14/03/1958		South Devon Railway	South Devon Railway		
D2272		28/03/1958		Heritage Shunters Trust	Peak Rail	Stored, out of use	Saw further use at British Fuel Co., Blackburn Coal Concentration Depot.
D2279		15/02/1960		East Anglian Railway Museum	East Anglian Railway Museum	Operational	Painted in BR Green with wasp stripes. Used regularly for shunting and on occasional passenger trains.
D2280		1960		Gloucestershire Warwickshire Railway	Gloucestershire Warwickshire Railway	Undergoing overhaul	Saw further use at Ford Motor Co. Ltd., Dagenham. After many years stored out of use at the North Norfolk Railway, it moved to the Gloucestershire Warwickshire Railway and in 2019 was nearing end of overhaul at Toddington diesel depot.
D2284		25/03/1960		Heritage Shunters Trust	Peak Rail	Stored, out of use	Saw further use at NCB Woolley Colliery
D2289		00/00/1960			Heritage Shunters Trust	Undergoing overhaul	
D2298		11/10/1960			Buckinghamshire Railway Centre	Undergoing overhaul	
D2302		31/10/1960			D2578 Locomotive Group, Moreton Business Park		Saw further use at British Sugar, Allscott Factory.
D2310		22/12/1960			Battlefield Line	Operational	Saw further use at Coal Mechanisation (Tolworth) Ltd., Tolworth Coal Concentration Depot
D2324		26/04/1961			Barrow Hill Roundhouse		Saw further use at the Southern Depot Co., NCB Coal Concentration Depot at Aylesbury.
D2325		29/04/1961			Mangapps Railway Museum	Operational	
D2334		25/07/1961	Heaton	Private	Mid-Norfolk Railway	Undergoing overhaul	Built by RS&H, at Darlington Works in 1961; allocated to Heaton from 25 July 1961; Percy Main (North Shields) from 8 June 1963; Gateshead from 30 January 1965; Darlington from 24 February 1968. Sold to National Coal Board 1968 for Manvers Main Colliery, then Wath, then Thurcroft, and finally Maltby. Sold for preservation in 1985.
D2337		30/08/1961		Heritage Shunters Trust	Peak Rail	Stored, out of use	Saw further use at NCB Manvers Coal Preparation Plant & Colliery, where it gained the name "DOROTHY".
2574 (works number)		10/12/1957		Private	Gloucestershire Warwickshire Railway	Operational	Never a BR loco, but the second of two built by RS&H after 11212 (DC/RSH 2572/7858, later D2242) and before 11213 (DC/RSH 2575/7862, later D2243), for industrial use at Willington Power Station. It is actually DC/RSH 2574/7860, but has been painted to impersonate D2260 (old style number 11230). The original D2260 was scrapped in 1983.

== Related engines ==
=== British industrial units ===
A number of almost identical industrial locomotives were supplied to various private companies in the United Kingdom. One example (works number 2252) supplied to Adams Newport in 1948 is preserved at the Mangapps Railway Museum where it has been modified to recreate a Wisbech and Upwell Tramway Class 04, using the number 11104, which was not used in the actual class 04 numbering sequence.

=== Export engines ===
The Class 04 design was the basis of some related narrow gauge industrial engines built for export overseas. An example of this was the Tasmanian Government Railways V class which ran on 3 ft 6 in gauge, necessitating an outside frame design, which was the main visible difference. Western Australia also had a similar engine used by the power authority at the time also on 3 ft 6 in gauge.

== Models ==
Airfix produced a plastic (static) OO gauge kit in the 1960s; this is still available in the Dapol range as kit number C60.

Bachmann produced an example in N and OO gauge. The British N gauge Bachmann model was introduced in 2007. An HO gauge model was made to be used as the Thomas & Friends character Mavis.

In O gauge, Vulcan produced a kit and Bachmann produced ready-to-run models.

In 2008, Bachmann Brassworks released Gauge 1 versions of the Class 04 in BR green and BR blue.
