= British Rail Class 47 =

Class of diesel electric locomotives

Brush Type 4 British Rail Class 47
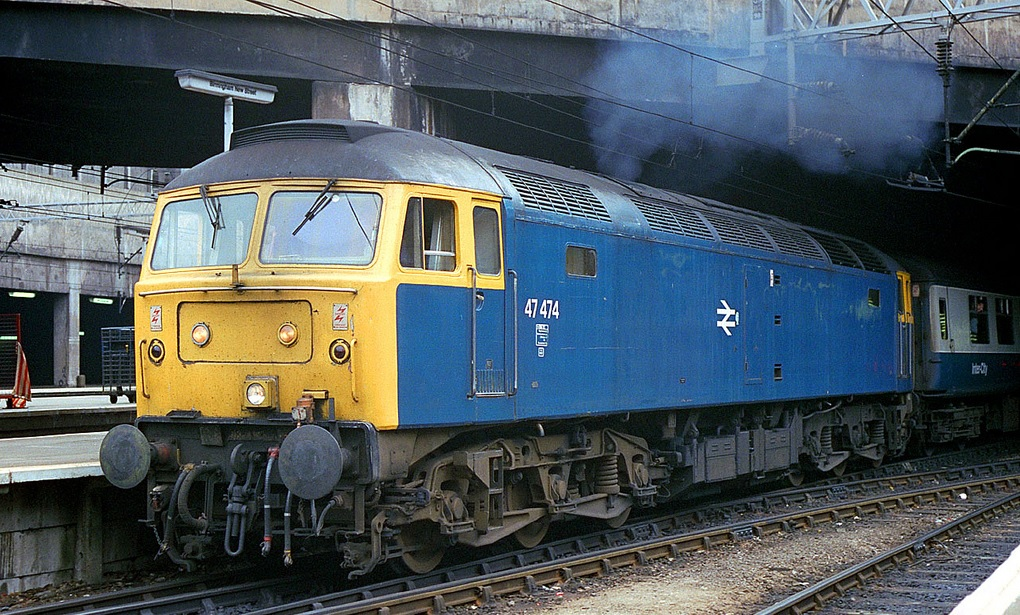
- A Class 47 at Birmingham New Street in 1987
Type and origin
- Power type: Diesel-electric
- Builder: Brush Traction; British Rail Crewe Works
- Build date: 1962–1968
- Total produced: 512
Specifications
- Configuration
  - UIC: Co′Co′
  - Commonwealth: Co-Co
- Gauge: 4 ft 8 1/2 in (1,435 mm) standard gauge
- Wheel diameter: 3 ft 9 in (1.143 m)
- Wheelbase: 51 ft 6 in (15.70 m)
- Length: 63 ft 7 in (19.38 m)
- Width: 8 ft 10 in (2.69 m)
- Height: 12 ft 9 1/2 in (3.90 m)
- Loco weight: 112 long tons (114 t; 125 short tons) to 125 long tons (127 t; 140 short tons)
- Fuel capacity: 850 imp gal (3,900 L; 1,020 US gal)
- Prime mover: Sulzer 12LDA28-C
- MU working: Not fitted when built. Some now retrofitted with ● Green Circle or TDM
- Train heating: 47/0: Steam generator 47/3: None; 47/4: Electric Train Heat
- Train brakes: Vacuum, Air, or Dual
Performance figures
- Maximum speed: 75 mph (121 km/h) or 95 mph (153 km/h) 100 mph (160 km/h) [47/7]
- Power output: Engine: originally 2,750 bhp (2,050 kW), later derated to 2,580 bhp (1,920 kW)
- Tractive effort: Maximum: 55,000 lbf (245 kN) to 60,000 lbf (267 kN)
- Brakeforce: 61 long tons-force (608 kN)
Career
- Operators: British Rail; English Welsh & Scottish; Colas Rail; Direct Rail Services; GB Railfreight; Harry Needle Railroad Company; Riviera Trains; West Coast Railways; Rail Operations Group
- Numbers: D1500–D1999, D1100–D1111 later 47 001–47 981
- Axle load class: Route availability 6 or 7
- Withdrawn: 1965 (2), 1969 (1), 1971 (1), 1980 (1), 1986–present
- Disposition: 32 preserved, 33 converted to Class 57, 51 still in service, remainder scrapped

The British Rail Class 47 or Brush Type 4 is a class of diesel-electric locomotive that was developed in the 1960s by Brush Traction. A total of 512 Class 47s were built at Brush's Falcon Works in Loughborough and at British Railways' Crewe Works between 1962 and 1968, which made them the most numerous class of British mainline diesel locomotive.

They were fitted with the Sulzer 12LDA28C twin-bank twelve-cylinder unit producing 2,750 bhp (2,050 kW) – though this was later derated to 2,580 bhp (1,920 kW) to improve reliability – and have been used on both passenger and freight trains on Britain's railways for over 55 years. Despite the introduction of more modern types of traction, a significant number are still in use, both on the mainline and on heritage railways.

As of July 2024, 76 locomotives still exist as Class 47s, including 32 which have been preserved. 31 locomotives, including six which are preserved, retain mainline running certificates. A further 33 locomotives were converted to Class 57s between 1998 and 2004.

== Origins ==
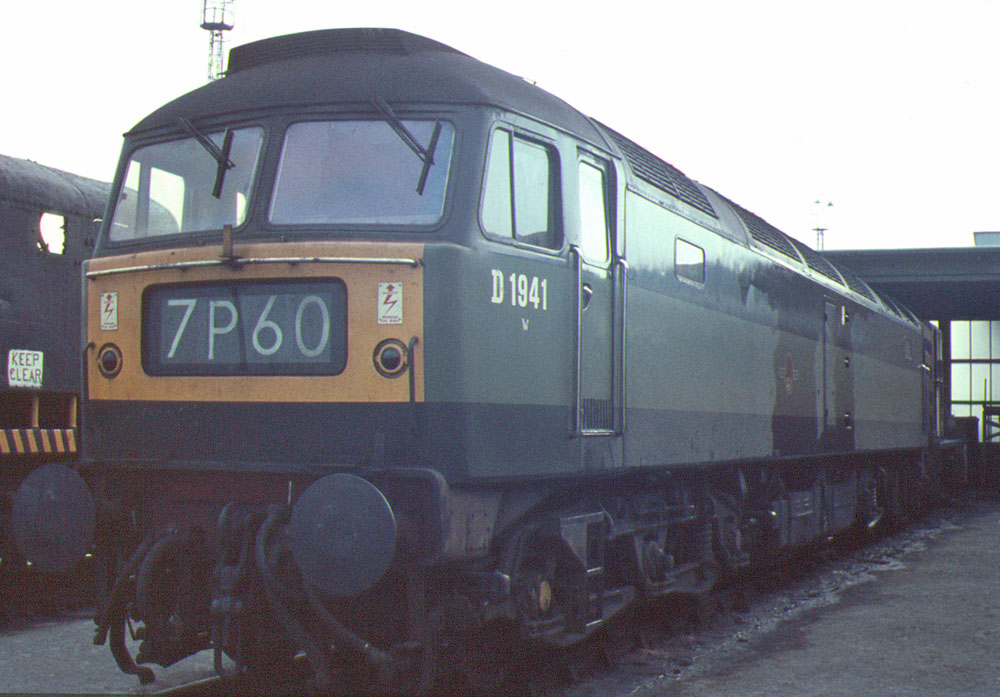
D1941 in the original two-tone green livery, at Landore depot in 1967

The Class 47 history began in the early 1960s with the stated aim of the British Transport Commission (BTC) to remove steam locomotives from British Rail by a target date of 1968. It therefore required a large build of Type 4 but with an axle load of no more than 19 long tons (19.3 t). The BTC was not convinced that the future of diesel traction lay down the hydraulic transmission path of the Western Region, and concentrated on diesel-electric designs.

Initially, the BTC invited tenders to build 100 locomotives to the new specification. The following responses were received:

- A consortium of the Birmingham Railway Carriage and Wagon Company, Associated Electrical Industries and Sulzer offered a production version of their D0260 Lion prototype under construction at the time, with both steam and electric heating
- Brush Traction offered three options: a production version of their twin-engined D0280 Falcon prototype under construction, or a single engine design using either a Sulzer engine or the English Electric 16CSVT, including steam heating with an option for electric heating
- English Electric offered a design based on the eventual DP2 prototype
- North British Locomotive Company offered a Sulzer-powered design with steam and electric heating

Of these bids, the BRCW/AEI/Sulzer bid was the preferred option, but before the prototypes could be assessed, the need to build a large number of locomotives quickly was deemed paramount, and the BTC decided on a new approach: it decided to cancel the final order of twenty Class 46 locomotives and invite bids for twenty locomotives of the new Type 4 specification using the Brush electrical equipment intended for the cancelled order. Brush won the contract.

This initial build of 20 locomotives (Nos. D1500 to D1519) were mechanically different from the remainder of the type, using Westinghouse-supplied brake systems, and would be withdrawn earlier than the rest of the class which used Metcalfe-Oerlikon brakes.

Based on the success of these initial 20 locomotives an order for 270 was made, which was later revised upwards a number of times to reach the final total of 512. 310 locomotives were constructed by Brush in Loughborough, and the remaining 202 at BR's Crewe Works. Five locomotives, Nos. D1702 to D1706, were fitted with a Sulzer V12 12LVA24 power unit and classified as Class 48s; the experiment was not deemed a success, and they were later converted to standard 47s.

=== Orders ===
The locomotives were ordered in 6 batches as follows:

- D1500–D1519, 28 February 1961.
- D1520–D1681, 1 January 1962.
- D1682–D1706, 4 September 1962.
- D1707–D1781, 28 September 1962.
- D1782–D1861, 22 July 1963.
- D1862–D1999 & D1100–D1111, 24 March 1964.

== In service ==
Distribution of locomotives, March 1974
British Rail Class 47 is located in Scotland
British Rail Class 47 is located in England
British Rail Class 47 is located in Greater London
Code	Name	Quantity
BR	Bristol Bath Road	41
BS	Bescot	51
CD	Crewe Diesel	80
CF	Cardiff Canton	53
CW	Cricklewood	3
FP	Finsbury Park	12
GD	Gateshead	28
HA	Haymarket	8
HO	Holbeck	11
IM	Immingham	41
IS	Inverness	1
KY	Knottingley	10
LE	Landore	27
OC	Old Oak Common	24
SF	Stratford	30
TE	Thornaby	11
TI	Tinsley	48
TO	Toton	21
YK	York	8
Withdrawn (1965–71)		4
Total built:		512

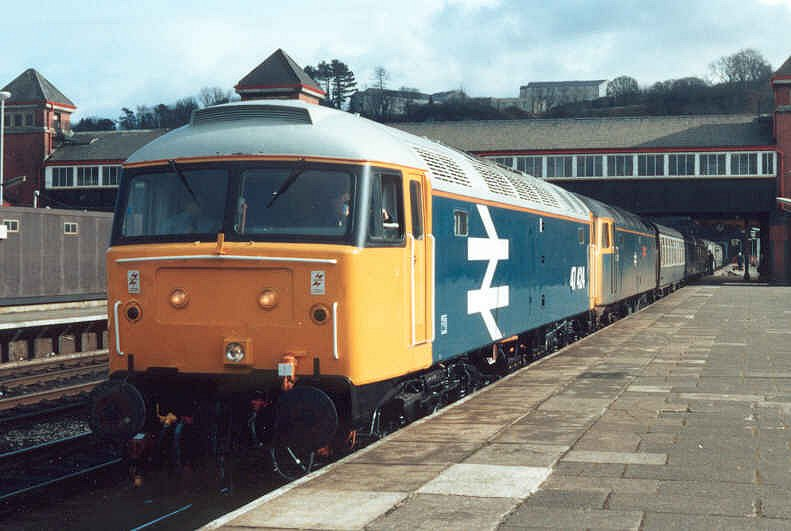
Two Class 47s, Nos. 47424 and 47607, at Bangor station with a passenger train in 1987

The first 500 locomotives were numbered sequentially from D1500 to D1999, with the remaining twelve being numbered from D1100 to D1111. The locomotives went to work on passenger and freight duties on all regions of British Rail. Large numbers went to replace steam locomotives, especially on express passenger duties.

The locomotives, bar a batch of 81 built for freight duties, were all fitted with steam heating boilers for train heat duties. The initial batch of twenty, plus D1960 and D1961, were also fitted with electric train heating (ETH). With this type of heating becoming standard, a further large number of locomotives were later fitted with this equipment.

In the mid-1960s, it was decided to de-rate the engine output of the fleet from 2,750 bhp (2,050 kW) to 2,580 bhp (1,920 kW), significantly improving reliability by reducing stresses on the power plant, whilst not causing a noticeable reduction in performance.

== Sub-classes ==
In the early 1970s, the fleet was renumbered into the 47xxx series to conform with the computerised TOPS systems. This enabled a number of easily recognisable sub-classes to be created, depending on the differing equipment fitted. The original series were based on train heating capability and were as follows;

- Class 47/0: Locomotives with steam heating equipment.
- Class 47/3: Locomotives with no train heating.
- Class 47/4: Locomotives with dual or electric train heating.

However, this numbering system was later disrupted as locomotives were fitted with extra equipment and were renumbered into other sub-classes. For an overview of the renumbering see the List of British Rail Class 47 locomotives. This section summarises the main sub-classes that were created.

=== Class 47/0 ===
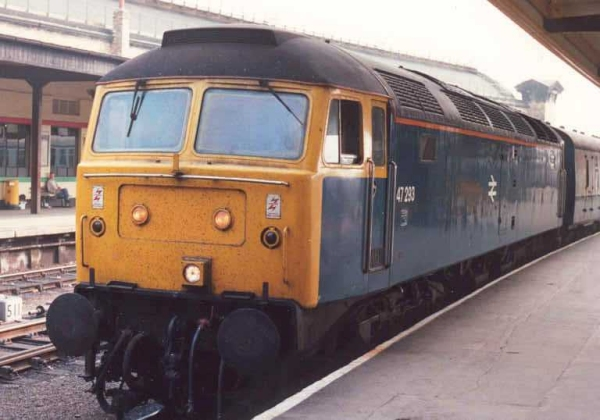
Class 47/0 47293 with a relief passenger train at York station in 1987

Originally numbered D1520–1781, D1837–74, D1901–59, D1962–99 and D1100 (later given TOPS numbers from 47001 to 47298), these locomotives were the "basic" Class 47 with steam heating equipment fitted. In the 1970s and 1980s, with steam heating of trains gradually being phased out, all locomotives fitted with the equipment gradually had their steam heating boilers removed. Some were fitted with ETH and became 47/4s, whilst the others remained with no train heating capability and were therefore used mainly on freight work. In the 1990s, the class designation 47/2 was applied to some class 47/0s and class 47/3s after they were fitted with multiple working equipment. The locomotives involved also had their vacuum braking systems removed or isolated, leaving them air braked only. This was mainly a paper exercise, however, and the locomotives were not renumbered; in this article they are included in Class 47/0.

=== Class 47/3 ===
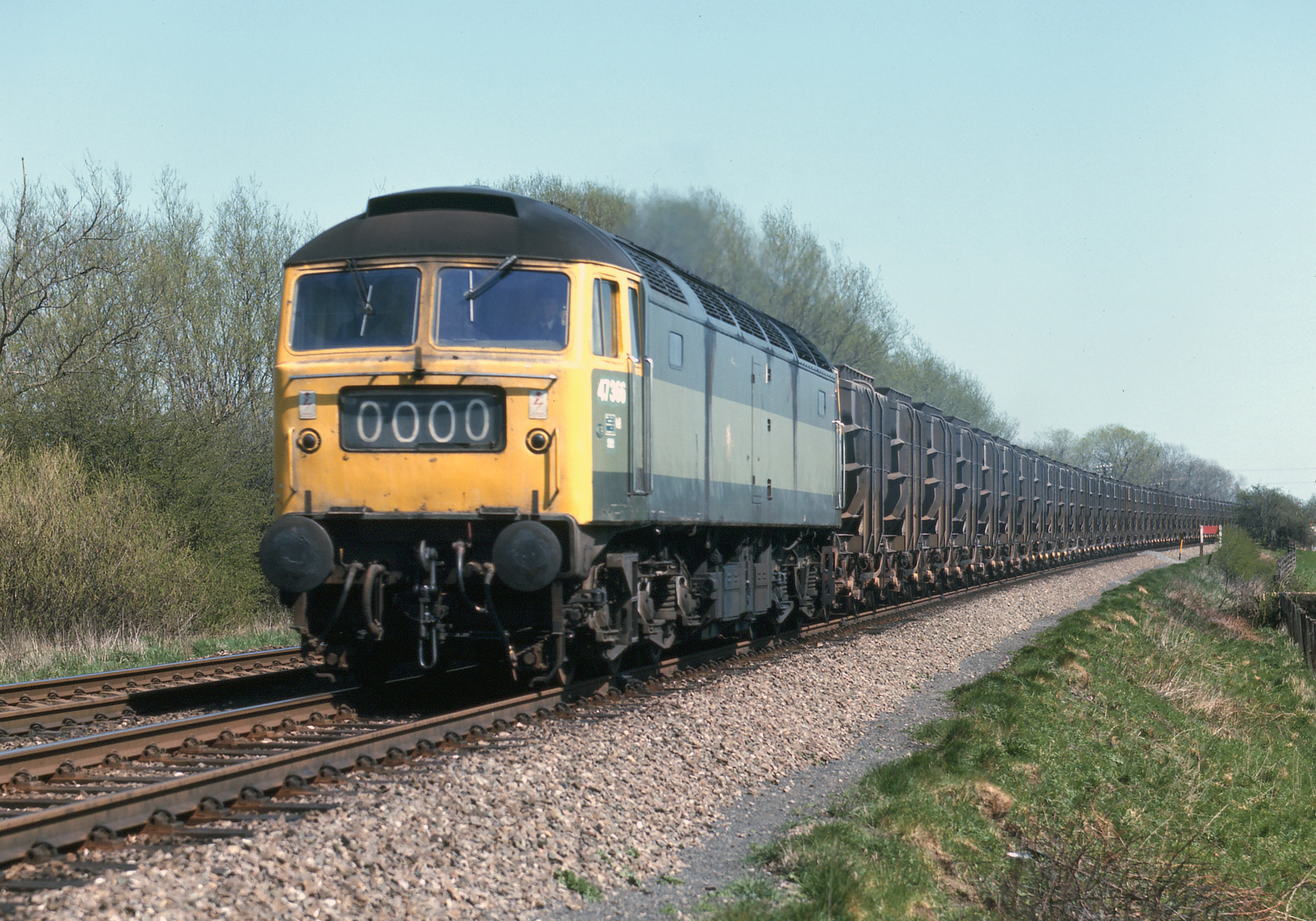
Class 47/3, no. 47376, with allocated TOPS number but still in two-tone green livery at Frisby on the Wreake, 1976

Originally numbered D1782–1836 and D1875–1900 (later given TOPS numbers from 47301 to 47381), this sub-class was originally built with no train heating equipment and therefore remained as freight locomotives almost exclusively for their working lives. They were all fitted with slow speed control for working MGR coal trains (as were a number of Class 47/0s). However, during the summer months when train heat was not required, 47/3s could regularly be found hauling the extra trains that the holiday season brought. The sub-type remained stable until withdrawals started, although an "extra" 47/3, 47300, was created in 1992 when 47468 had its train heating equipment removed and was renumbered. This was a direct replacement for collision damaged 47343. Also, 47364 was renumbered to 47981 in 1993 for use on RTC test trains.

=== Class 47/4 ===
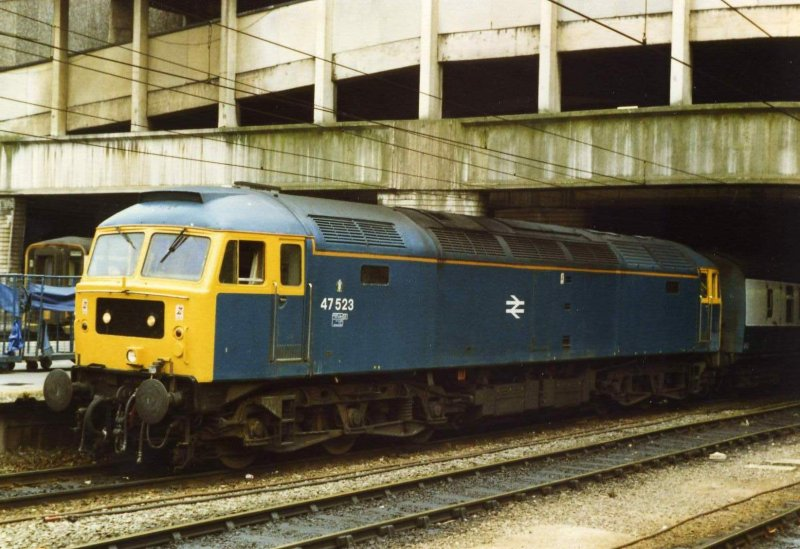
Class 47/4 47523 in standard BR Blue, at Birmingham New Street station in 1988

The designation for standard locomotives fitted with ETH and therefore used for passenger, mail and parcels use. The original batch of twenty locomotives (D1500–D1519) were built with dual steam and electric train heating, the electric heating being tapped from the locomotive's DC generator. However, no more were constructed in this way until 1967 when the final two Brush-built locomotives, D1960 and D1961, were fitted with a new type of electric heat system using an AC alternator. Approximately 112 more locomotives had been fitted with this system by the time TOPS renumbering occurred (some of which retained the steam heat facility following ETH fitment whilst others had it removed at that time), and shortly afterwards the sub-class had settled down to 154 locomotives, numbered 47401–47547 and 47549–47555. Later, further Class 47/0s were converted to Class 47/4s and renumbered into the series from 47556 onwards, which eventually reached 47665.

=== Class 47/6 and Class 47/9 ===
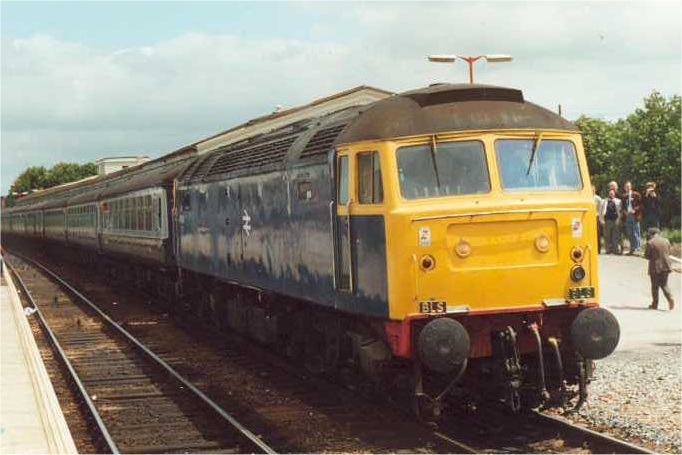
Class 47/9 47901 on a railtour at Westbury station in 1987

After being severely damaged in a derailment near Peterborough in 1974, locomotive 47046 was selected to be a testbed for the projected Class 56, and was fitted with a 16-cylinder Ruston 16RK3CT engine rated at 3,250 bhp (2,420 kW) for assessment purposes. To identify it as unique, it was renumbered 47601 (at the time the number range for Class 47s only extended as far as 47555). Later, in 1979, it was used again for the Class 58 project, fitted with a 12-cylinder Ruston engine (this time of 3,300 bhp (2,500 kW)), and renumbered 47901. It continued with this non-standard engine fitted until its withdrawal in 1990.

=== Class 47/7 ===
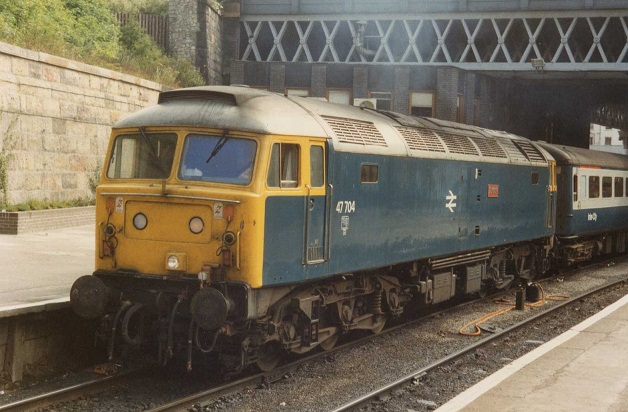
British Rail Class 47 no. 47704 at Glasgow Queen Street in 1984.

In the late 1970s, BR authorities identified a need to replace the ageing trains operating the Glasgow to Edinburgh shuttle services, in order to increase speed and reliability. The trains were operated by pairs of Class 27s, one at each end of this train. It was decided to convert twelve 47/4s to operate the service in push-pull mode. The locomotives would be known as Class 47/7 and would be fitted with TDM push-pull equipment and long-range fuel tanks, and be maintained to operate at 100 mph (160 km/h). The conversions began in 1979 and the service was operated completely by them from 1980. In 1985, the push-pull service spread to Glasgow-Aberdeen services, and a further four locomotives were converted. The sub-class therefore comprised 47701 to 47716, though a further locomotive, 47717, was converted in 1988 after the fire-damaged 47713 was withdrawn.

=== Class 47/7b and 47/7c ===
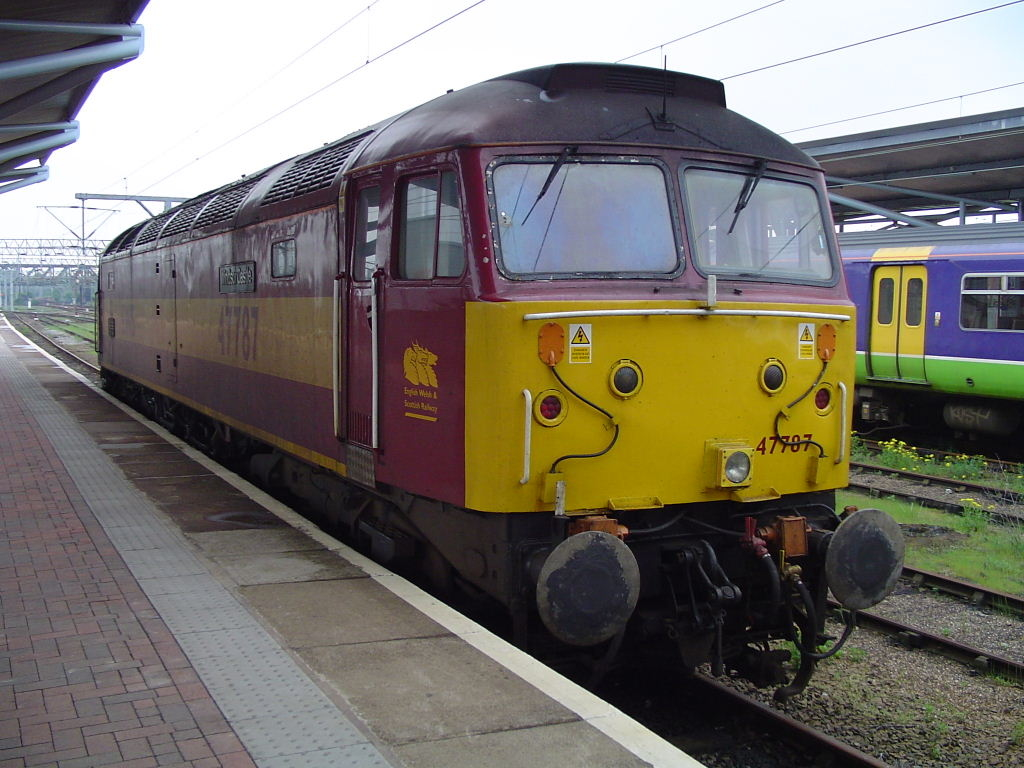
Class 47/7. 47787 parked in a bay platform at Rugby station

In the 1990s, further 47/4s were converted with long-range fuel tanks and equipment to allow them to work with a type of rolling stock known as propelling control vehicles-PCV, which utilised RCH (Railway Clearing House) cables to allow the PCV driver to signal to the driver on the locomotive to apply power and operate the brakes - neither these locomotives nor the PCVs were equipped with TDM push-pull equipment. They were also numbered into the 47/7 series, from 47721 onwards. With dwindling passenger work for them, a number of 47/8s, already fitted with the extra fuel tanks, were also renumbered into this series.

Two locomotives, 47798 Prince William and 47799 Prince Henry, were dedicated for use on the Royal Train, and were designated as Class 47/7c. The two locomotives were replaced by a pair of Class 67 locomotives in 2004, and were subsequently withdrawn for preservation.

=== Class 47/4 (extended range) ===
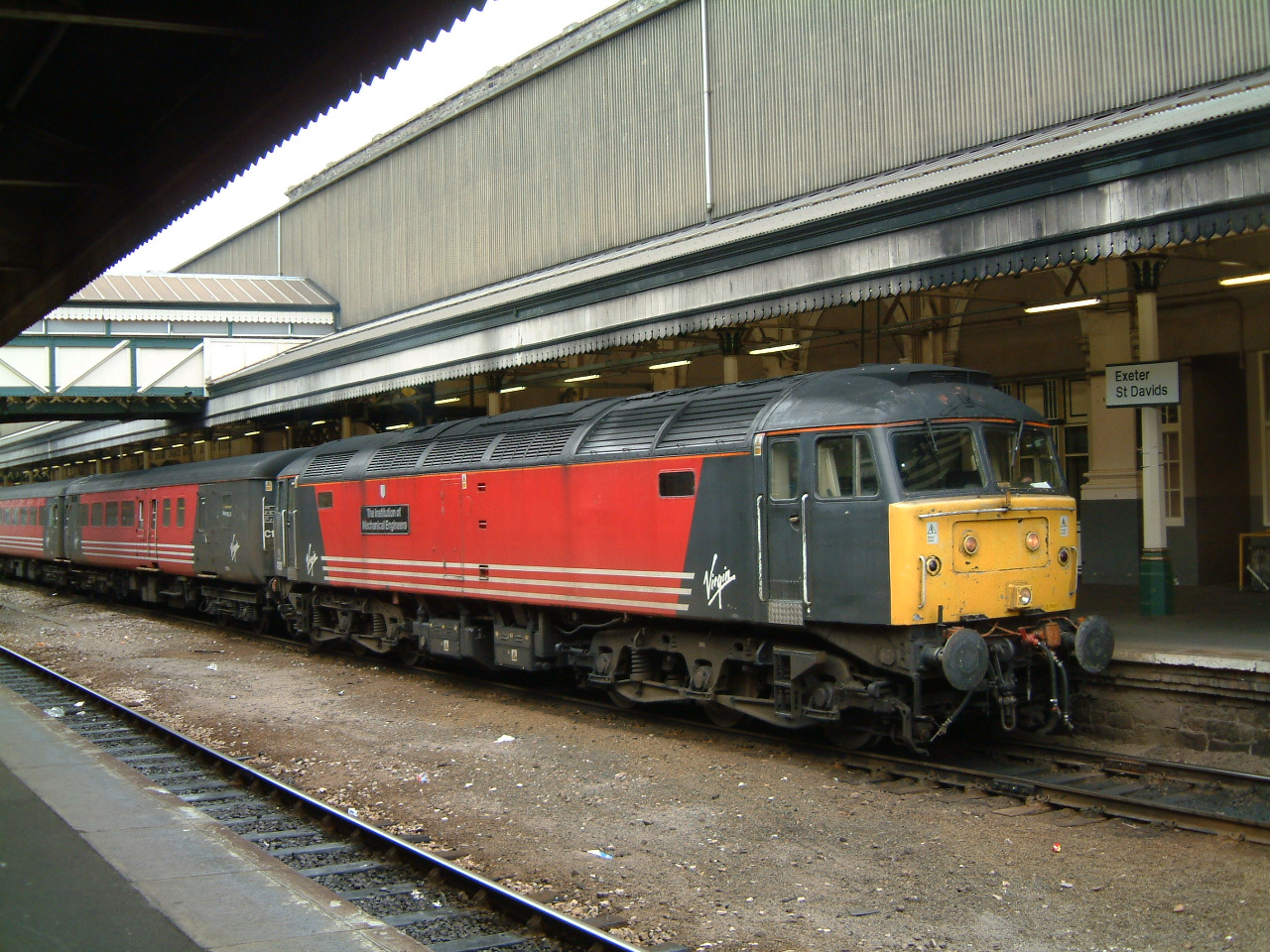
47817 in Virgin Trains livery at Exeter St Davids station.

The last of the original 47/4 conversions, from 47650 to 47665, were fitted with extra fuel tanks, giving them an extended range. Four earlier Class 47/4s were also converted. In 1989 it was decided to make these locomotives easily recognisable and so they were renumbered into their own series from 47801 to 47820. At the same time, further locomotives were fitted with extra fuel tanks and renumbered; the series eventually reached 47854. After the privatisation of British Rail, the locomotives in the 47/8 number range were mainly used by Virgin CrossCountry on cross-country work until the introduction of Class 220 Voyager trains. These duties have kept them maintained in serviceable condition, allowing them to remain operational longer than the majority of their classmates. As a consequence most of them received relatively recent overhauls. The locomotives in this number range are officially Class 47/4s under the TOPS system.

== Decline ==
By 1986, only five of the original 512 locomotives had been withdrawn from service, all because of serious accident damage. However, with work for the class declining due to the introduction of new rolling stock and spare parts becoming difficult to source, some inroads started being made.

The first locomotives to be targeted were the non-standard pilot batch of 20, now numbered 47401-47420. Three locomotives were withdrawn as life-expired in February 1986 and the remainder of the batch that had not recently been overhauled followed in the next two years. All 20 were withdrawn by 1992.

Meanwhile, BR drew up a 'hit-list' of locomotives for early withdrawal, mainly including those with non-standard electrical equipment, known as series parallel locomotives. In the outset, withdrawals were slow, mainly due to the surplus of spare parts and new flows of freight traffic which required extra locomotives; only 61 locomotives had been withdrawn by the end of 1992. However, with the introduction of new locomotives, the rate of withdrawal quickly rose, with 86 more 47s reaching the end of their lives in the next three years. With most of the non-standard locomotives withdrawn, the reduction of the fleet again proceeded more slowly. The privatisation of British Rail also resulted in new independent rail companies needing available traction until they could order new locomotives. From 1996 to 2006, an average of around fifteen locomotives per year were taken out of service.

During the decline in passenger work a number of locomotives were painted in "celebrity" colours, depicting various liveries that the type had carried during its history. This continued a tradition of painting 47s in unusual liveries, which dates back to 1977, when Stratford depot in East London painted two locomotives with huge Union Flags to celebrate the Silver Jubilee of Queen Elizabeth II.

== Fleet summary ==
Mainline registered locomotives as of January 2023. This table does not include 47375, which was exported to Hungary in 2015. West Coast Railways is currently the largest operator of the type, though they began scrapping their stored locomotives in January 2023.

Owner	Operational	Total	Non-operational	Total
Nemesis Rail	47701	1	47703, 47744	2
GB Railfreight	47727, 47739, 47749	3		
Harry Needle Railroad Company			47785	1
Locomotive Services Limited	47593, 47712, 47805, 47810, 47830, 47853 (running as 47614)	6	47501, 47816, 47818, 47841	4
West Coast Railways	47237, 47245, 47270, 47746, 47760, 47786, 47802, 47804, 47812, 47813, 47815, 47826, 47832, 47848, 47851, 47854	17	47768, 47772, 47776, 47787, 47843, 47847	6
Preserved locomotives with mainline certificates	47580, 47773, 47799, 47828	4	47715	1
Total		31		14

== Preservation ==
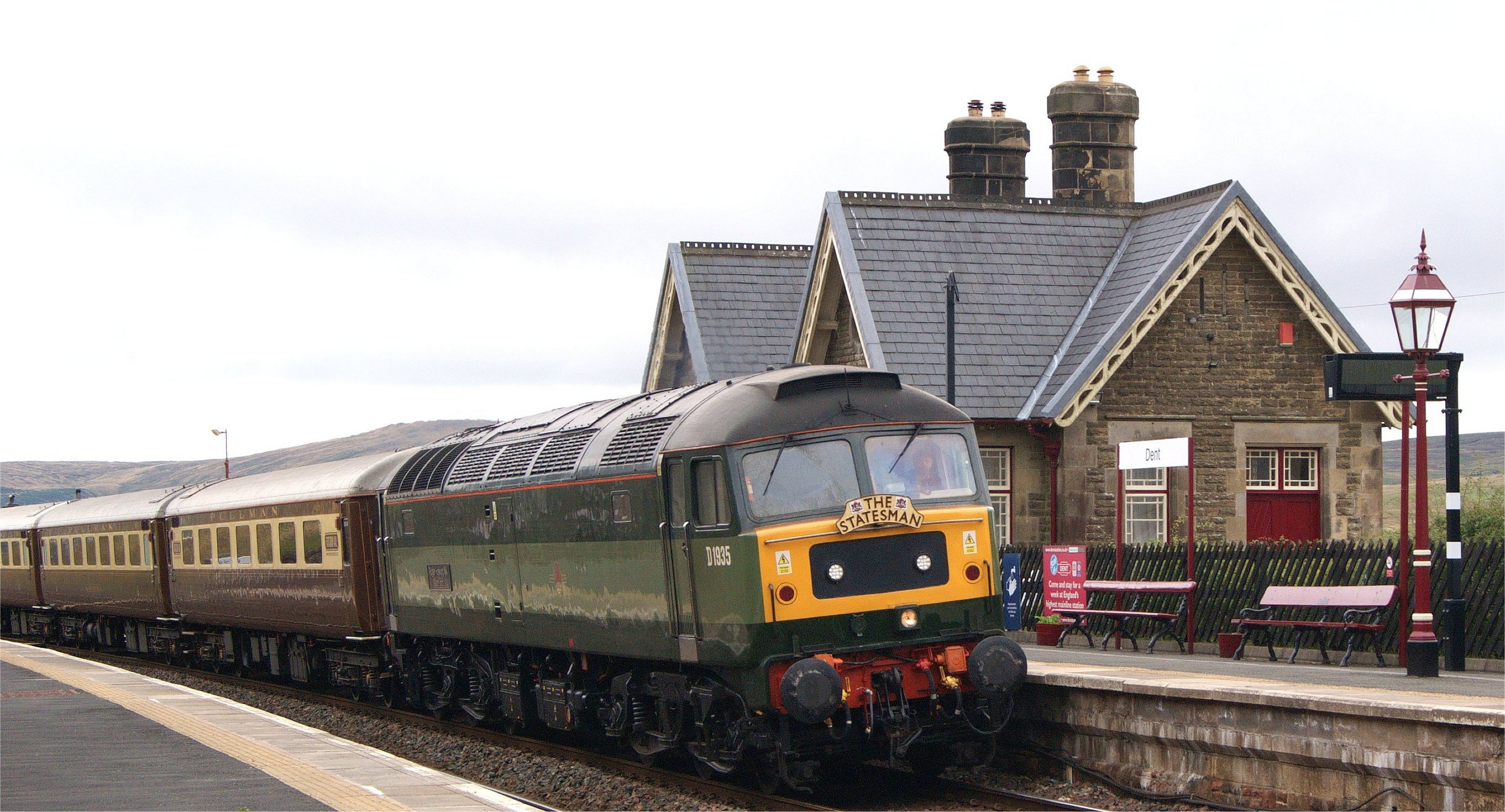
Restored Class 47, D1935 "Roger Hosking MA", heading North with a complement of Pullman Coaches at Dent Station on the Settle - Carlisle line

There are 31 Class 47 locomotives in the ownership of preservationists and private railways.

== Class 57 ==
Thirty-three locomotives were rebuilt with EMD engines and re-classified as Class 57s. Freightliner took 12, Virgin Trains 16 and First Great Western five. Today these are owned by Direct Rail Services (17), Great Western Railway (4), Rail Operations Group (4), and West Coast Railways (8, including the prototype passenger engine 57 601).

== Accidents ==
- 11 January 1965: D1734 was severely damaged after the freight train it was hauling ran out of control near Shrewsbury, eventually demolishing a signal box. It was withdrawn two months later, becoming the first Class 47 withdrawn after a working life of only eight months. Withdrawn in March 1965, it was cut up in April.
- 17 December 1965: D1671 THOR was derailed near Bridgend whilst hauling a train of empty coaches. Shortly afterwards, a freight train collided heavily with the wreckage, killing the driver and second man of this locomotive. D1671 was withdrawn in April 1966; its nameplates were salvaged, and transferred to No. D1677; and D1671 was cut up in June 1966.
- 8 April 1969: D1908 was badly damaged when, while hauling a freight train at Monmore Green, it was struck head-on by a passenger train that had passed a signal at danger. D1908 caught fire after the accident and became the third Class 47 withdrawn. The driver of the freight train and the passenger train driver were killed. Withdrawn in August 1969, it was cut up in October.
- 13 March 1971: D1562 was wrecked after severe fire damage at Haughley Junction while the locomotive was hauling a Liverpool Street to Norwich express. It was withdrawn in June 1971 and cut up in September.
- 11 June 1972: D1630 was involved in the Eltham Well Hall rail crash in which six people were killed. The locomotive was repaired, but much later in its life when numbered 47849, it was withdrawn from the Class 57 rebuilding programme after damage was discovered which was thought to have dated back to the accident.
- 25 August 1974: 47236 was hauling a passenger train that passed a signal at danger and was derailed at Dorchester West. Eighteen people were injured.
- 16 March 1976: 47274 collided with a lorry that had fallen from a bridge onto the line near Eastriggs. The drivers of both the train and the lorry were killed.
- 5 September 1977: 47402 was hauling a mail train when it was in a head-on collision with a diesel multiple unit at Farnley Junction, Leeds, West Yorkshire due to a signalling fault. Both drivers were killed and fifteen were injured.
- 22 October 1979: 47208 suffered severe damage in a fatal accident at Invergowrie in Scotland. It was hauling a Glasgow to Aberdeen service which collided with a local train which had stopped in front. The locomotive was withdrawn in January 1980 and cut up in April.
- 8 December 1981: 47409 was hauling a York to Liverpool express which derailed 1,600 feet (500 m) north of Ulleskelf. Whilst the locomotive stayed upright, all the carriages derailed and carriages six and seven rolled down a steep bank. This resulted in 24 people requiring hospitalisation with nine of those being serious. One man later died of his injuries. The cause of the derailment was found to be a crack in one of the rails of the Up Normanton line.
- 9 December 1983: 47299 (formerly 47216) was involved in a serious accident at Wrawby Junction in Lincolnshire, when whilst hauling an oil train, the locomotive collided with a local train resulting in the death of a passenger. It later emerged that the locomotive's renumbering was allegedly due to a warning given to BR by a clairvoyant who claimed to have foreseen a serious accident involving a locomotive numbered "47216".
- 30 July 1984: 47707 Holyrood was propelling the 17:30 express from Edinburgh to Glasgow from the rear, when the train collided with a cow near Polmont and was derailed, resulting in 13 deaths. The accident raised serious concerns about the safety of push-pull operation where the locomotive was at the rear of the train.
- 20 December 1984: Summit Tunnel fire: Locomotive 47125 was hauling a freight train of petrol tankers which derailed and caught fire in Summit Tunnel, on the Lancashire/West Yorkshire border.
- 18 January 1986: 47111 was run into by a Class 104 diesel multiple unit which had a brake failure and had passed three signals at danger at Preston. Forty-four people were injured.
- 9 March 1986: 47334 was one of two light engines that were hit head-on by a passenger train at Chinley, Derbyshire due to a signalman's error. One person was killed. Lack of training and a power cut were contributory factors.
- 20 February 1987: 47089 Amazon was hauling a freight train that ran away and was derailed by trap points at North Junction, Chinley, Derbyshire. Another train ran into the wreckage and was derailed.
- 24 March 1987: 47202 was hauling a freight train that overran signals and was in a head-on collision with a passenger train (hauled by 33 032) at Frome North Junction, Somerset. Fifteen people were injured, some seriously.

== Miscellany ==
In 1976, 47155 was moved to West Thurrock power station for use as a stationary generator while problems with one of the plant's auxiliary generators were investigated. The locomotive was removed from its bogies and mounted on a heavy timber frame.

== Model railways ==
In 1976 Hornby Railways launched its first version of the BR Class 47 in OO gauge. Lima produced a range of Class 47 models in OO gauge. In 2009, Italian manufacturer ViTrains introduced their OO gauge model of the Class 47 in three liveries. In 2013, a BR Blue version of D1662 Isambard Kingdom Brunel was commissioned by Modelzone, based on Bachmann's OO gauge model. The production run was a limited edition of 512 models. Currently, OO gauge models are available from the Hornby Railroad, Heljan and Bachmann ranges with a new model under development by Cavalex.

In 2009, Bachmann released a British N gauge version of 47404 Hadrian in BR Blue. In 2010, Bachmann issued a British N gauge model of 47474 Sir Rowland Hill in Parcels Sector red and grey livery.

== Cuba ==
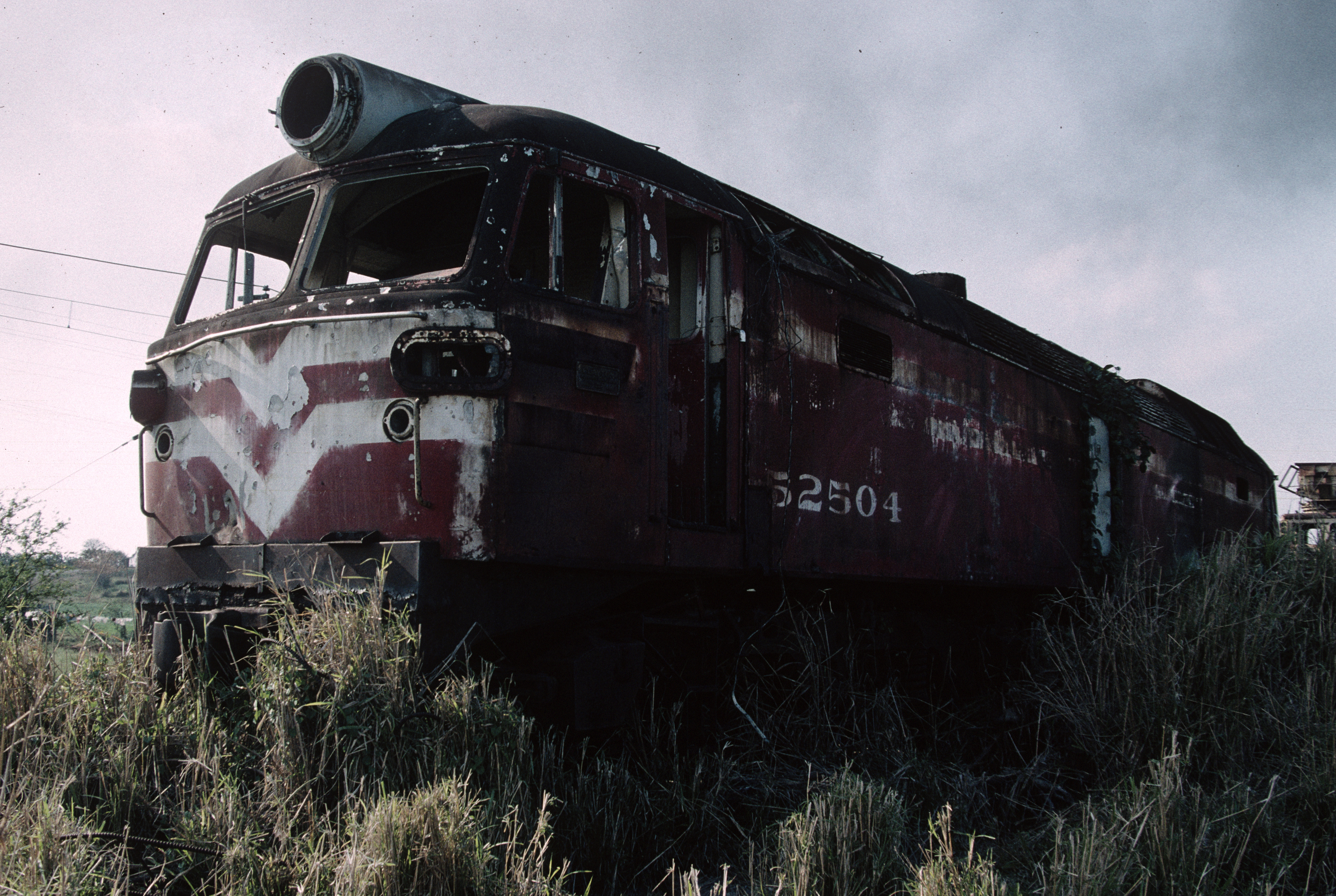
A Cuban Brush Type 4 locomotive in 1996

Between 1963 and 1966, ten locomotives similar to the British Rail Class 47 were supplied to Ferrocarriles de Cuba (Cuban National Railways). Although built by Brush, they were publicly stated to be supplied by Clayton Equipment Company.

== See also ==
- List of British Rail modern traction locomotive classes

== References and sources ==
=== Sources ===
- Stevens-Stratten, S.W.; Carter, R.S. (1978). British Rail Main-Line Diesels. Shepperton: Ian Allan Ltd. ISBN 978-0-7110-0617-1.
- Toms, George (1978). Brush Diesel Locomotives, 1940-78. Sheffield: Turntable Publications. ISBN 978-0902844483. OCLC 11213057.
