= Tanglewood Lake =

- Location of Tanglewood Lake within New York
- Location: Delaware County, New York
- Coordinates: 42°13′51″N 74°52′16″W
- Type: Reservoir
- Basin countries: United States
- Surface area: 10 acres (4.0 ha)
- Surface elevation: 1,867 ft (569 m)
- Settlements: De Lancey

Tanglewood Lake is a small reservoir located northeast of De Lancey in Delaware County, New York. Tanglewood Lake drains south via an unnamed creek that flows into Bagley Brook.

== See also ==
- List of lakes in New York
