= InterCity rail in the United Kingdom =

InterCity Rail travel

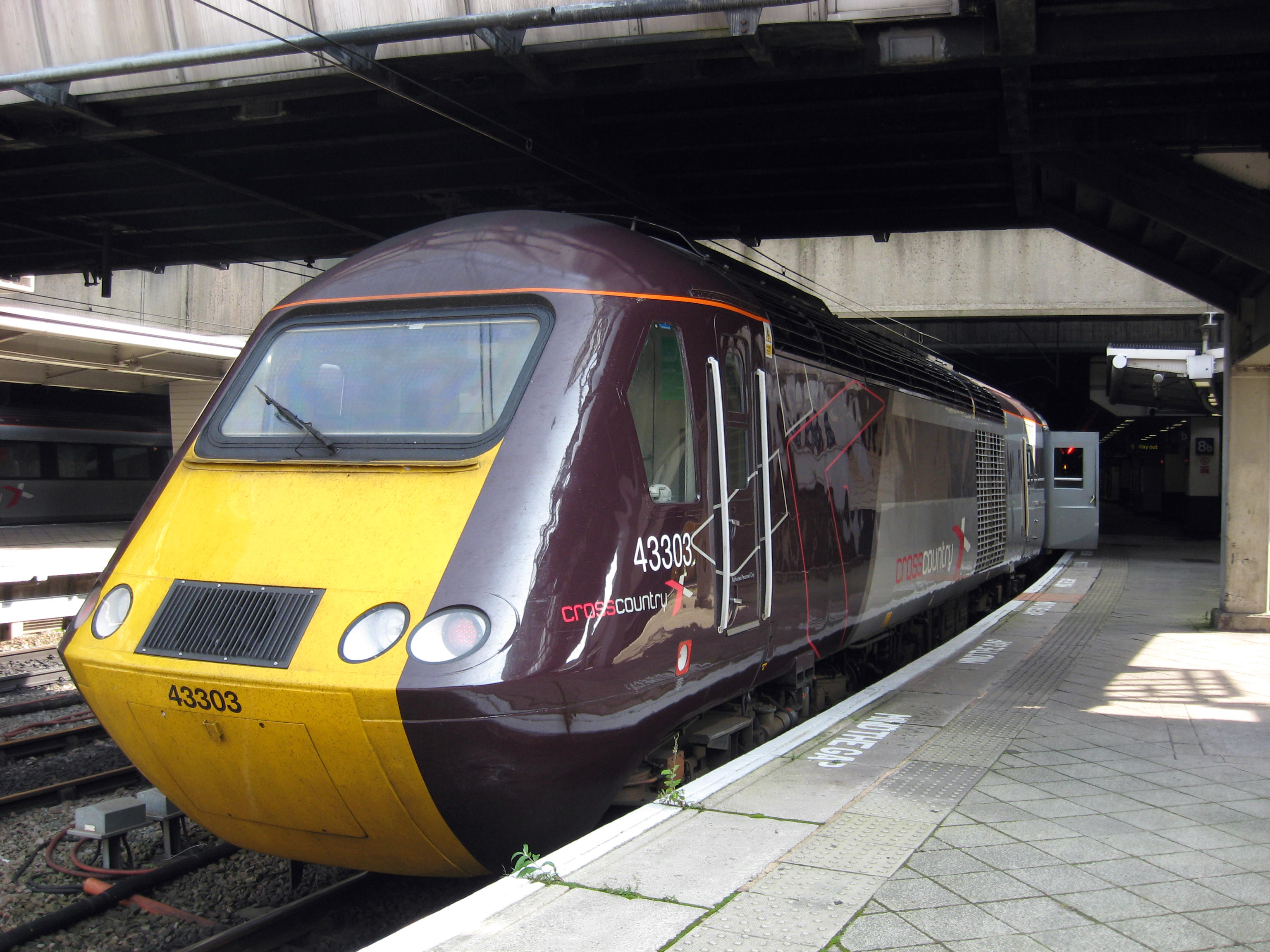
The InterCity 125 is the world's fastest diesel train.

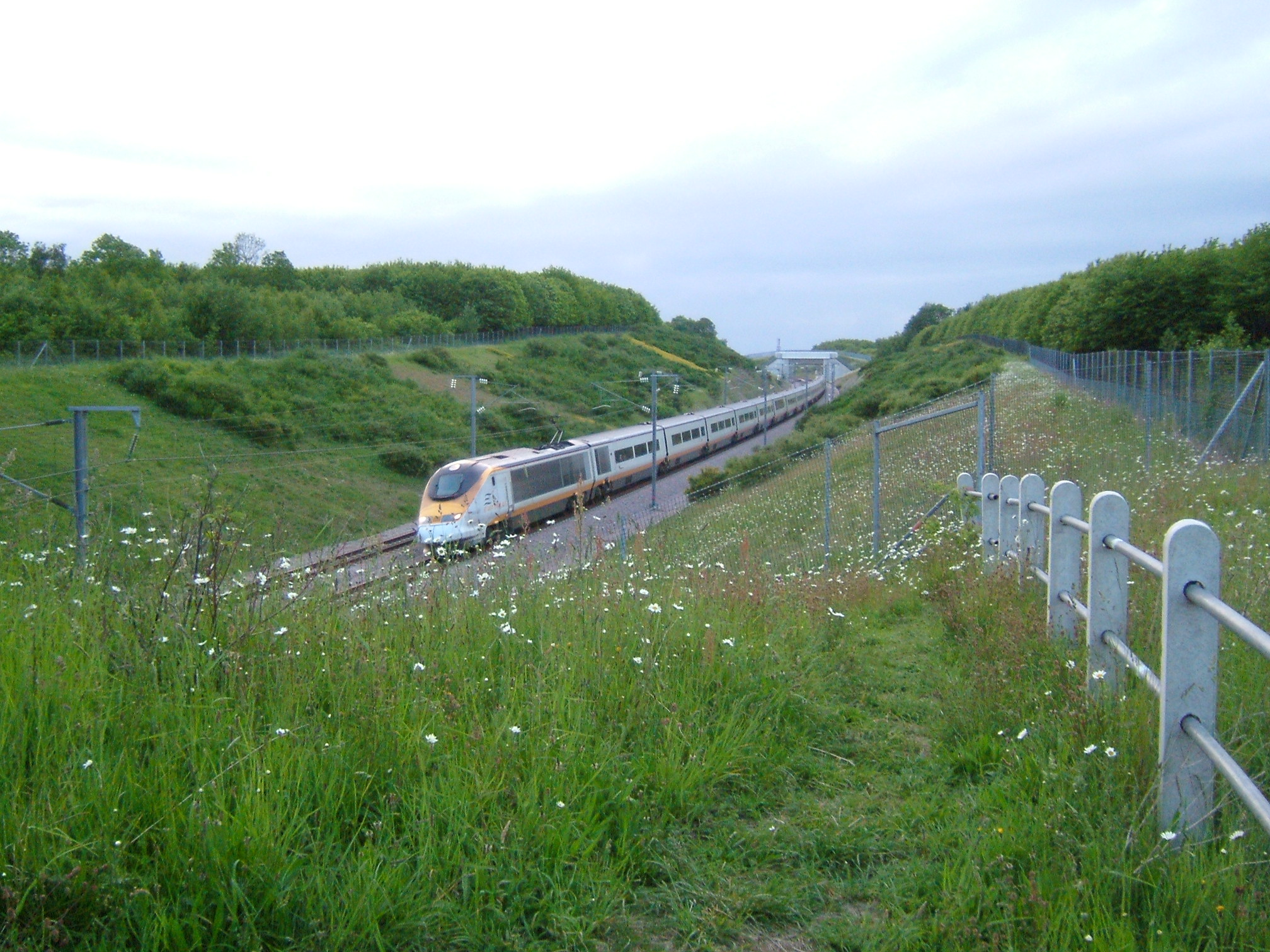
Eurostar services are one of only two international rail services serving the United Kingdom, the other being the Enterprise between Northern Ireland and the Republic of Ireland. Eurostar is the only service in Great Britain operating at speeds of more than 250 km/h (160 mph).

Great Britain has numerous Intercity services traversing the country. However, unlike in other countries, these are not clearly defined or branded. Most of these trains are high speed, and some operate into France, Belgium, and the Netherlands via the Channel Tunnel.

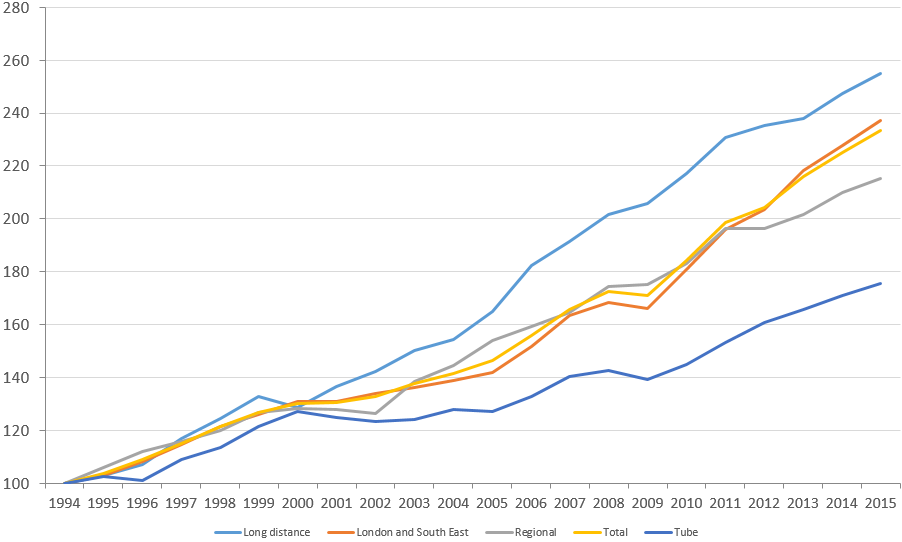
Increase in passenger rail by sector 1994–2015, as well as a comparison with the London Underground

== History ==
British Rail InterCity

In 1830, the first intercity railway in the world was built between the cities of Liverpool and Manchester in northwest England for the purpose of transporting both passengers and goods. A railway mania ensued, with intercity railways springing up across the country. The UK's main intercity routes, the West Coast Main Line from London to Glasgow opened in 1849, and the East Coast Main Line from London to Edinburgh opened in 1860. Before the Grouping in 1923, most services were operated by joint stock as various rail companies owned separate sections of track that intercity services operated over. Following the Grouping, intercity services were amalgamated with local services under the "Big Four", the London and North Eastern Railway, the Great Western Railway, the London Midland and Scottish Railway and the Southern Railway. Named trains became increasingly prominent during this period, as did the luxury of such services. These luxurious services included the Flying Scotsman on the east coast, the Royal Scot on the west and the Cornish Riviera Express in the south west.

In 1948 the Big Four were nationalised to form British Railways. However, after the demise of steam in 1968 the number of luxury services and named services declined. In 1966 the brand name Inter-city was introduced by British Rail. The hyphen was later dropped. InterCity ran trains from London to South West England, Wales, the West Midlands, the East Midlands, North West England, Yorkshire and the Humber, North East England, Scotland and East of England. There were also numerous cross-country services, which were inter-city services that traversed several regions and usually avoided Greater London. Intercity was broken into varying franchises during the privatisation of British Rail.

== Today ==
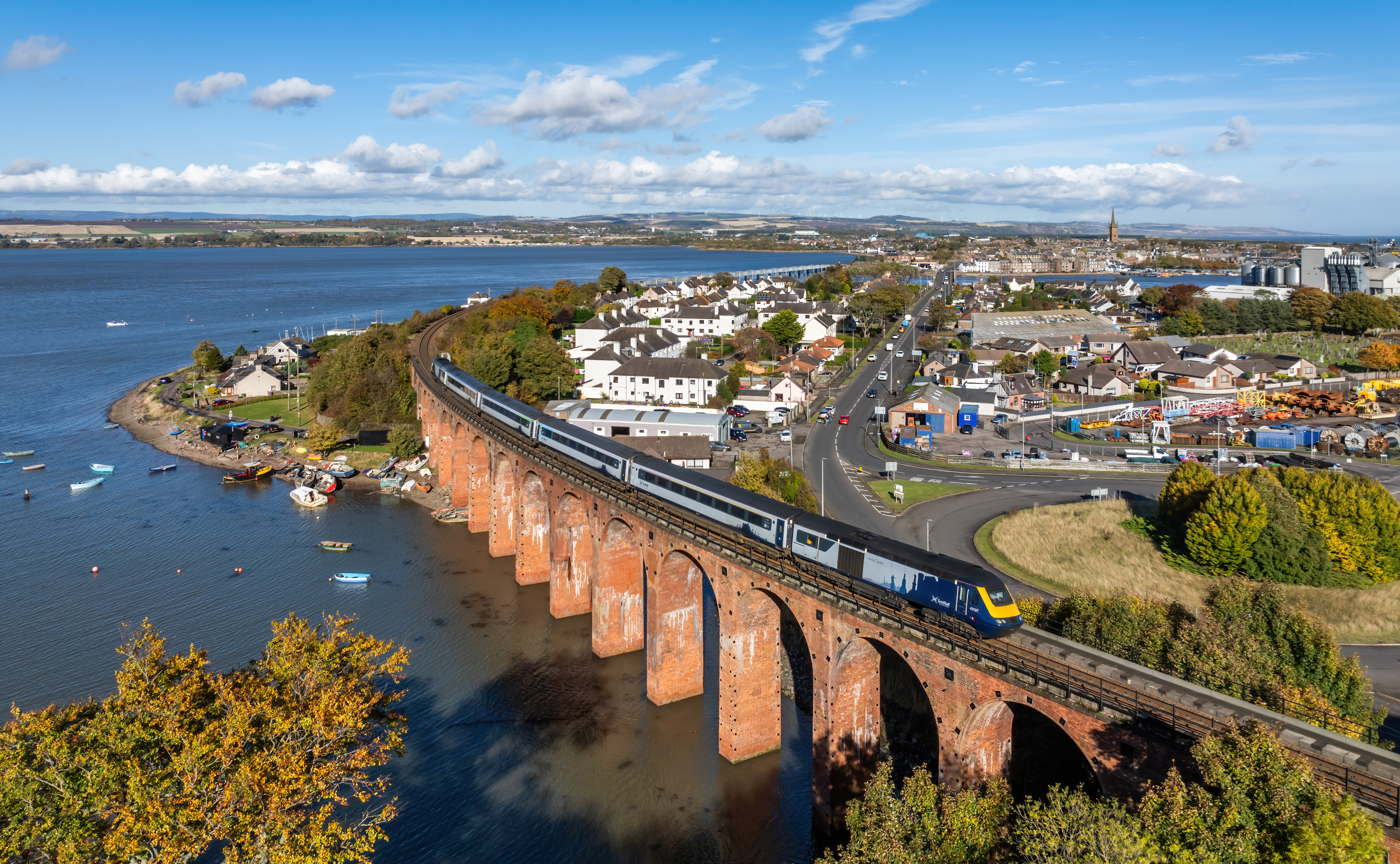
ScotRail HST InterCity service bound for Aberdeen

Since privatisation, the distinction between InterCity and regional express has become increasingly blurred. Many services once considered regional express are now operated and marketed as intercity, including TransPennine Express and ScotRail. There are also numerous companies which operate a mixture of inter-city, regional express and local services.

The UK's current longest direct rail service is operated by CrossCountry from Aberdeen to Penzance, and takes 13 hours 23 minutes to complete. The service is due to cease operation on 16 May and after this date the service will terminate in Plymouth, and no longer hold the title for the UK's longest direct rail journey.

Inter-city trains from London operate out of the following London terminals:

- London Euston — trains to the West Midlands, North West, North Wales and Scotland;
- London King's Cross — trains to the East Midlands, Yorkshire and the Humber, North East England and Scotland;
- London Paddington — trains to the West, South West England, West Midlands and South Wales;
- London St Pancras International — trains to the East Midlands and South Yorkshire, and international Eurostar services to France, Belgium and the Netherlands;
- London Liverpool Street — trains to East of England.

The following train operating companies operate inter-city trains in Great Britain (operators marked with an asterisk are open-access operators and only inter-city routes listed):

- Avanti West Coast - Services on the West Coast Mainline
- Caledonian Sleeper - Sleeper Services between London, Edinburgh, Glasgow, Fort William, Aberdeen and Inverness
- CrossCountry - Services between Scotland, Midlands and the Southwest as well as Manchester and Bournemouth avoiding London
- East Midlands Railway (EMR) - Services between London, Sheffield and Nottingham.
- Eurostar* - International services from London to France, Belgium and the Netherlands
- Great Western Railway (GWR) - Services between London and the Southwest as well as South Wales
- Greater Anglia - Services to Norwich
- Grand Central* - Services from London to Sunderland and Bradford Interchange
- Hull Trains* - Services from London to Hull
- London North Eastern Railway (LNER) - Services on the East Coast Mainline
- Lumo* - Services from London to Edinburgh
- ScotRail - Intercity services within Scotland
- TransPennine Express - Services between Yorkshire, the Northeast, Scotland and Manchester
- Transport for Wales (TfW) - Services between Manchester and Holyhead to Cardiff

In Northern Ireland, there are inter-city services between it and the Republic of Ireland known as Enterprise.

== See also ==
- Rail transport in the United Kingdom
- High-speed rail in the United Kingdom
