= Summit Tunnel fire =

1984 railway disaster near Todmorden, West Yorkshire, England

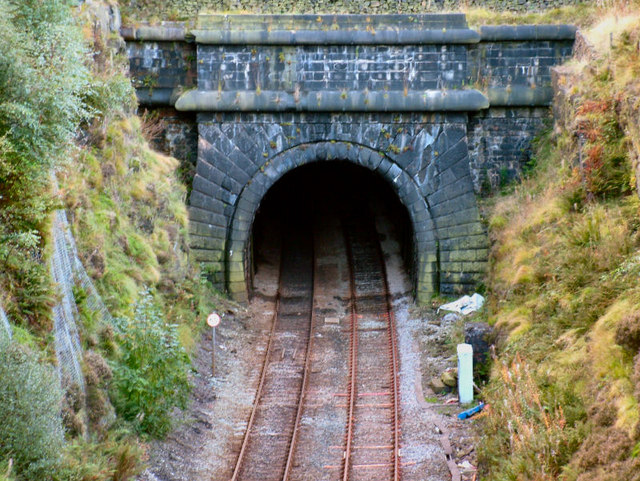
- South portal, Summit Tunnel

- Location within England

Details
- Date: 20 December 1984
- Location: Summit Tunnel, Lancashire/West Yorkshire border
- Coordinates: 53.6751°N 2.088261°W
- Country: United Kingdom
- Line: Manchester and Leeds Railway
- Operator: British Rail
- Incident type: Derailment and fire
- Cause: Defective bearing

Statistics
- Trains: 1
- Crew: 3

The Summit Tunnel fire occurred on 20 December 1984, when a dangerous goods train caught fire while passing through the Summit Tunnel on the railway line between Littleborough and Todmorden on the Greater Manchester/West Yorkshire border, England.

== Background ==
The tunnel, which is 2,885 yards (2,638 m) in length, was built in 1840–41. Twelve of the fourteen construction shafts were left open to help vent smoke and steam from the locomotives that passed through it.

The incident was one of a series of British railway accidents during 1984, coming only days after the fatal collision between an express passenger train and a train of fuel oil tankers at Eccles, Greater Manchester on 4 December. One day earlier on 3 December a train guard had been killed after a collision between a diesel multiple unit and parcels vans at Longsight also in Manchester. This third serious railway accident in the North West of England in less than three weeks led the Littleborough and Saddleworth MP Geoffrey Dickens to call for an inquiry into railway safety, in particular with respect to the conveyance of dangerous chemicals such as those involved in the accidents at Eccles and Summit Tunnel.

== Fire ==
The train involved was the 01:40 freight train from Haverton Hill, Teesside to Glazebrook oil distribution terminal near Warrington. It was formed by class 47 diesel locomotive 47 125 and thirteen tankers.

At 05:50 on 20 December 1984, the train, carrying more than 1,000,000 litres (260,000 US gal) or 835 tonnes (920 short tons) of four-star petrol in thirteen tankers, entered the tunnel on the Yorkshire (north) side traveling at 40 miles per hour (64 km/h). One-third of the way through the tunnel, a defective axle bearing (journal bearing) derailed the fourth tanker, which caused the derailment of those behind. Only the locomotive and the first three tankers remained on the rails. One of the derailed tankers fell on its side and began to leak petrol into the tunnel. Vapour from the leaking petrol was probably ignited by the damaged axle box.

The three train crew members could see fire spreading through the ballast beneath the other track in the tunnel, so they left the train and ran the remaining mile to the south portal (where they knew there was a direct telephone connection to the signalman) to raise the alarm.

Crews from Greater Manchester Fire Brigade and West Yorkshire Fire Brigade quickly attended the scene. Co-ordination between the brigades appears to have worked well, perhaps because they had both participated in an emergency exercise in the tunnel a month before.

Aided by the Greater Manchester Fire Brigade, the train crew returned to the train, where they uncoupled the three tankers still on the rails and used the locomotive to drive them out. Fire-fighters then loaded firefighting equipment onto track trolleys and sent a crew with breathing apparatus (BA) in to begin their firefighting operation at the south end of the train. They also lowered hose lines down one of the ventilation shafts to provide a water supply. At the same time, crews from West Yorkshire fire brigade entered the tunnel and began fighting fires in the ballast at the north end of the train.

However, at 9.40 a.m., the pressure in one of the heated tankers rose high enough to open its pressure relief valves. The vented vapour caught fire and blew flames onto the tunnel wall. The wall deflected the flames both ways along the tunnel, and the bricks in the tunnel wall began to spall and melt in the flames. The BA crews from both brigades decided to evacuate. They managed to leave just before the first explosion rocked the tunnel. The firefighters were saved because blast relief shafts 8 and 9 acted as flame vents (a function their designer never envisaged).

Left to itself, the fire burned as hot as it could. As the walls warmed up and the air temperature in the tunnel rose, all 10 tankers discharged petrol vapour from their pressure relief valves. Two tankers melted (at approximately 1,530 °C or 2,790 °F) and discharged their remaining loads.

The fuel supply to the fire was so rich that some of the combustibles were unable to find oxygen inside the tunnel with which to burn; they were instead ejected from vent shafts 8 and 9 as fuel-rich gases that burst into flame when they encountered oxygen in the air outside. At the height of the fire, pillars of flame approximately 150 metres (490 ft) high rose from the shaft outlets on the hillside above.

The gases are estimated to have flowed up these shafts at 50 metres per second (110 mph). Air at this speed is capable of blowing around heavy items: hot projectiles made from tunnel lining (rather like lava bombs from a volcano) were cast out over the hillside. These set much of the vegetation on fire, and caused the closure of the A6033 road. In the cleanup operation afterwards, small globules of metal were found on the ground surrounding shaft 9; these had been melted from the tanker walls, swept up with the exhaust gases, and dropped out onto the grass around the top of the shaft.

Unable to get close enough to safely fight the fire directly, the fire brigades forced high-expansion foam into ventilation shafts far from the fire. This created blockages that starved the fire of oxygen. By mid-afternoon the next day, the inferno was no longer burning, though the fire was by no means knocked down. Petrol continued to leak from the derailed wagons through the tunnel drainage and ballast and the vapour sporadically reignited when it came into contact with the hot tunnel lining. Two hundred people were evacuated from their homes and workplaces in Walsden in response. They were allowed back home the next day.

The brigades continued to fight the fire for another two days, until West Yorkshire Fire Brigade issued the stop message just after 6:30 p.m. on Christmas Eve. Fire crews remained at the site until 7 January 1985.

== Aftermath ==
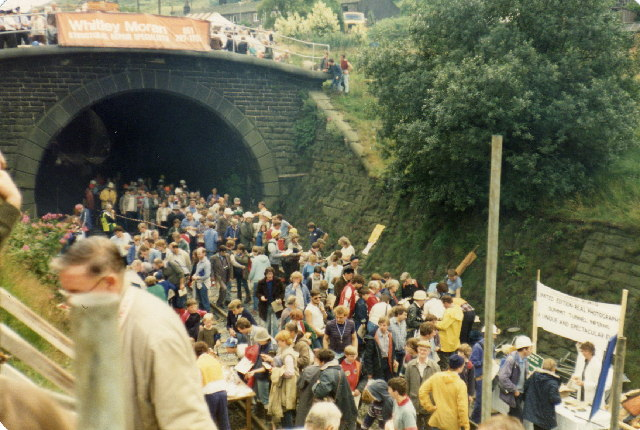
People walking through Summit Tunnel in August 1985, before the line was reopened to traffic

Due to the fire, the line between Rochdale and Todmorden was closed. Passenger trains between two stations were replaced by buses. Of the 1,100,000 litres (240,000 imp gal; 290,000 US gal) of petrol carried by the train, 275,000 litres (60,000 imp gal; 73,000 US gal) were rescued by the train crew when they drove the locomotive and the first three tankers to safety. A further 16,000 litres (3,500 imp gal; 4,200 US gal) of petrol were recovered after the fire was extinguished, and 809,000 litres (178,000 imp gal; 214,000 US gal) (670 tonnes or 660 long tons or 740 short tons) burnt.

The damage done by the fire was minimal. Approximately half a mile of track had to be replaced, as did all the electrical services and signalling. The biggest surprise was how well the brick lining had stood up to the fire. Although some bricks in the tunnel and in the blast relief shafts had become so hot that they vitrified and ran like molten glass, most of the brickwork lining of the tunnel was scorched but still serviceable. One of the photographs taken in the aftermath shows a rail tanker directly beneath shaft 9: it is crowned with a mass of vitrified slag from bricks in the shaft that had melted and dripped down.

The last of the wagons was removed from the tunnel on 1 March 1985. Once British Rail had replaced the track and electrical services, shored up the bases of vent shafts 8 and 9 and filled the two shafts with inert foam (all this took eight months), locals were allowed a once-in-a-lifetime opportunity to walk through the tunnel before train services resumed on 19 August 1985.

At the Masons Arms public house in Todmorden, there is a small collection of photographs noting the fire, along with the statistics of the construction, and a quotation by George Stephenson, the tunnel's builder, who said, "I stake my reputation and my head that the tunnel will never fail so as to injure any human life".

== Investigation ==
A public enquiry was held into the accident. The hearing was held in Manchester. A report was published on 4 June 1985.

== See also ==
- List of transportation fires

== Notes ==
=== Sources ===
- Nock, O. S. (1987). Historic railway disasters (4 ed.). London: Ian Allan. ISBN 0711017522.
