= List of killings by law enforcement officers in the United States, August 2021 =

This is a list of people reported killed by non-military law enforcement officers in the United States in August 2021, whether in the line of duty or not, and regardless of reason or method. The listing documents the occurrence of a death, making no implications regarding wrongdoing or justification on the part of the person killed or officer involved. Killings are arranged by date of the incident that caused death. Different death dates, if known, are noted in the description. The table below lists 94 people.

== August 2021 ==
Date	Name (age) of deceased	Race	Location	Description
2021-08-31	George Watson (34)	Black	Washington, D.C.	Police attended Watson's apartment following a 911 call for a man on his balcony with a rifle. When Watson answered his apartment door, he repeatedly said to police, "Where that bitch in pink at?", before returning inside. When Watson emerged a second time holding what appeared to be a gun, he was shot dead. The gun was later identified as a pellet gun.
2021-08-31	Jeremy Michael Berg (45)	White	Martelle, Iowa	
2021-08-31	Robert Nelson (55)	White	Anaheim, California	
2021-08-30	Paris Wilder (38)	Black	West Melbourne, Florida	
2021-08-30	Martin Luther Bowman (80)	Black	Pearlington, Mississippi	
2021-08-30	Etianna Planellas (48)	Hispanic	Miami Shores, Florida	
2021-08-30	Brittni Muldrew (36)	White	Coconut Creek, Florida	
2021-08-30	Ronald J. Reiner (66)	White	Normal, Illinois	
2021-08-29	Name Withheld	Unknown race	Atlanta, Georgia	
2021-08-29	Grey Bell (40)	White	Atlanta, Georgia	
2021-08-29	Michael Rosado (24)	Hispanic	Bronx, New York	
2021-08-29	Jorge "Cury" Alberto Perez (48)	Hispanic	Morrisville, Pennsylvania	
2021-08-29	Albert "AJ" Ruiz Perez (32)	Hispanic	Victorville, California	
2021-08-29	Imran Ali Rasheed (32)	Middle Eastern	Plano, Texas	After shooting and killing a Lyft driver in Garland, Rasheed stole her car and drove to Plano Police headquarters, where he shot at people inside. Two Plano officers heard the gunshots and fired back, killing Rasheed.
2021-08-29	Johnny Lee Perry II (31)	Black	Missoula County, Montana	Sheriff's deputies responded to reports of a man with a machete on a bridge. After non-lethal foam bullets failed to work, a deputy shot Perry in the back with a rifle.
2021-08-28	Ingmar Von Strandberg (30)	White	Tonopah, Nevada	
2021-08-28	Name Withheld	Unknown race	Arkoma, Oklahoma	
2021-08-27	Fanta Bility (8)	Black	Sharon Hill, Pennsylvania	After a high school football game, a person was wounded in a drive-by shooting, and three officers fired back. District Attorney Jack Stollsteimer says there is a "high probability" that the shots fired by the officers accidentally struck four civilians, including Fanta Bility. In November 2021 two teenagers were charged with murder for exchanging gunfire, resulting in police opening fire and killing Bility and wounding three others. In January 2022, charges against the teenagers were dropped and a grand jury recommended that charges against three police officers be filed. Each officer was charged with ten counts of reckless endangerment and one count of manslaughter and involuntary manslaughter.
2021-08-27	Lonnel Cephas (19)	Black	Elkhart, Indiana	
2021-08-27	Brandon Ventura (33)	Native Hawaiian and Pacific Islander	Honolulu, Hawaii	
2021-08-27	Alexander Tadros (30)	White	Portland, Oregon	
2021-08-27	David G. Wandell (53)	White	Elmira, New York	
2021-08-27	Christopher Corey Moore (41)	Black	Greensboro, North Carolina	
2021-08-26	Samuel Kirk (26)	Unknown race	Sanford, Florida	
2021-08-26	Earl Lawhorn (33)	Black	Milwaukee, Wisconsin	Lawhorn was fatally shot by Milwaukee Police officers after refusing to drop a gun during a foot pursuit.
2021-08-26	Zaqua Radle-Maxson (27)	Native American	Wasilla, Arkansas	
2021-08-25	Robert Anderson (38)	Black	Crescent City, California	Distraught over a dispute with his spouse, police found Anderson walking in the road with a knife, and shot him dead after he advanced on them. "He was just at my house," said his friend, "and then I had to go over to the morgue and see him in a plastic bag."
2021-08-25	An'Twan Gilmore (27)	Black	Washington, D.C.	Police were called after a man was reported unconscious in his car at a stoplight. After noticing the man, An'Twan Gilmore, had a gun in his waistband, officers called for backup and a ballistic shield. According to body cam footage, police woke Gilmore up, and his car began to move. Gilmore stopped the car after being asked to. The footage then shows police shoot at Gilmore when the car began to move again. In 2023 the officer who shot Gilmore was charged with second-degree murder.
2021-08-25	Jonathan Daniel Mansilla (33)	Unknown	Rutland, Vermont	A corporal attempted to arrest Mansilla after a chase ended in a McDonald's bathroom. The corporal says he shot Mansilla after seeing him hold an object "he perceived to be an unknown weapon". Mansilla was holding a cellphone.
2021-08-22	Tyran C. Lamb (31)	Black	Milwaukee, Wisconsin	Lamb was shot and killed by police at 27th and Becher after a shootout with the Greenfield Police Department in which he wounded a 36-year-old police officer shortly before collapsing on a lawn and dying.
2021-08-21	Juan Luis Olvera-Preciado (59)	Hispanic	Guadalupe, California	After a group of officers recognized a man with an arrest warrant at an intersection, they opened fire, accidentally shooting and killing a civilian, Juan Luis Olvera-Preciado.
2021-08-21	Daryl Jay Carr (45)	White	Allenhurst, Georgia	
2021-08-21	Shannon Trevor McKinley (28)	White	Florence, Mississippi	
2021-08-20	Brandon Lee Schlichting (28)	White	Chanute, Kansas	
2021-08-20	George Michael Mireles (34)	Hispanic	Amarillo, Texas	
2021-08-19	Name Withheld ()	Unknown race	El Cajon, California	
2021-08-19	Douglas Brown Jr (26)	Unknown race	Selawik, Alaska	
2021-08-18	Lucas Antonio Salas (33)	Hispanic	Thornton, Colorado	
2021-08-18	Ronald Zavaglia (72)	White	Pflugerville, Texas	
2021-08-18	James Matalice Smith (41)	Black	Somerville, Texas	
2021-08-18	Kevin Eugene Norris (50)	White	Beckley, West Virginia	
2021-08-18	Devonte Dawayne Brown (28)	Black	Marietta, Georgia	
2021-08-18	Terrence Bey (29)	Black	Philadelphia, Pennsylvania	
2021-08-18	Ervin Olikong (34)	Hispanic	Highland, California	
2021-08-17	Alex Domina (19)	Unknown	Loveland, Colorado	Police were called by Domina's family during a mental health crisis. According to body cam footage, an officer shot Domina several times after he walked towards the officer with a knife. Domina was hospitalized and died on September 7.
2021-08-17	Destinee Thompson (27)	Native American	Wheat Ridge, Colorado	Thompson was pregnant when shot by police.
2021-08-16	Antonio Jackson (27)	Black	Memphis, Tennessee	
2021-08-16	Brodrick Shelton (42)	Unknown	Milwaukee, Wisconsin	Shelton was shot by police near a gas station. Police and witnesses say Shelton had a gun and fired at police.
2021-08-15	Katelyn L. Harris (29)	White	Chuckey, Tennessee	
2021-08-15	Phillip John Walden (40)	White	Chapin, South Carolina	
2021-08-15	Eric Padilla (34)	Hispanic	Albuquerque, New Mexico	
2021-08-15	Name Withheld ()	Unknown race	Barstow, California	
2021-08-14	Robert D. Bailey	Unknown race	Morton, Mississippi	
2021-08-14	John Vogel (80)	White	St. Paul, Nebraska	
2021-08-14	Stephanie Gerardi (38)	White	Saugus, Massachusetts	
2021-08-14	Kyle Anthony Goidosik (35)	White	Climax, Michigan	Authorities say Goidosik shot and killed a Kalamazoo County sheriff’s deputy before dying in an exchange of gunfire with other deputies.
2021-08-13	Mauricio Luna (27)	Unknown	Knoxville, Tennessee	While responding to a burglary call an officer's cruiser struck Luna's vehicle driving 90 miles per hour. Luna and his dog Ceci both died. In 2022 the officer involved resigned from the Knoxville Police Department.
2021-08-13	Steven D. Primm (35)	White	San Antonio, Texas	
2021-08-13	Name Withheld	Unknown race	Bakersfield, California	
2021-08-12	Dextor Trevor Attaway (35)	White	Winnie, Texas	
2021-08-12	William Sellers (73)	White	Orlando, Florida	
2021-08-11	Name Withheld	Unknown race	Denver, Colorado	
2021-08-11	Adrian Joel Sanchez (34)	Hispanic	Castaic, California	
2021-08-11	Rodney Coleman (50)	Unknown race	Victorville, California	
2021-08-11	Daniel Turney Crowley (31)	White	Nashville, Tennessee	
2021-08-11	Elia S. Laeli (41)	Native Hawaiian or Pacific Islander	Honolulu, Hawaii	
2021-08-11	Brooks Hacker (35)	White	Juniata, Nebraska	
2021-08-10	James "Jim" Robert Wiesner Sr. (51)	White	North Aurora, Illinois	
2021-08-10	Johan Alexis Salazar (21)	Hispanic	El Mirage, Arizona	
2021-08-10	Marvin Richard Hitchcock (71)	White	Grantsboro, North Carolina	
2021-08-09	Steven Ray Bailey (63)	White	Rocky Face, Georgia	
2021-08-09	Luis Manuel Garcia-Arias (39)	Hispanic	Tustin, California	
2021-08-09	Christopher Robinson (48)	Black	Seguin, Texas	
2021-08-08	Marcus Martin (40)	Black	Baltimore, Maryland	
2021-08-08	Randal Boyd Burton (62)	White	Spring, Texas	
2021-08-08	Michael Contrell Adams III (19)	Black	Detroit, Michigan	
2021-08-08	Dashawn "Big Top" Batiste (22)	Black	Lafayette, Louisiana	
2021-08-07	Ryan Pederson (43)	White	Bismarck, North Dakota	
2021-08-07	Che Noe Zuniga Jr. (21)	Hispanic	Bakersfield, California	
2021-08-06	Hayden Charles McIlvain (34)	White	Coeur d'Alene, Idaho	
2021-08-06	Roger Peter Lynch (59)	White	Delancey, New York	
2021-08-06	Nathan Larry Parsons (49)	White	Cullman, Alabama	
2021-08-06	Matthew-Tuan Anh Tran (22)	Asian	La Habra, California	A woman called police to report that an unknown man was following her before pulling in front of the police station. When officers questioned Tran, he denied following the woman, but when an officer began walking away Tran pulled out a gun and shot him before being shot and killed by the other officer.
2021-08-05	Isaiah Hinds (22)	White	Seattle, Washington	Seattle police shot and killed a 22-year-old man after he allegedly fired shots at officers in a White Center neighborhood Thursday evening. The incident happened just before 6 p.m. near the intersection of 21st Ave. Southwest and Southwest 100th St., near North Shorewood Park. Nollette said officers used a loudspeaker to tell the suspect to come out of the house so they could take him into custody. When the suspect came out, he allegedly fired a gun at officers. Three officers returned fire, hitting and killing the suspect, Nollette said in a press conference Thursday evening. Seattle police and SWAT officers were at a home serving a warrant for a suspect they believed was involved in a homicide case that happened earlier this year, according to Seattle Police Assistant Chief Deanna Nollette.
2021-08-05	Chad Fiscus (35)	White	Rockville, Indiana	
2021-08-05	Aler Ronald Escobar-Velasquez (36)	Hispanic	Joplin, Missouri	
2021-08-05	Joseph John Howard (35)	White	Hartford, Vermont	
2021-08-04	Dylan Christopher Harmer (21)	White	Glendora, California	
2021-08-04	Sean Rowe (38)	White	Mansfield, Ohio	
2021-08-04	Terrance Dominic Knight (19)	White	Blackfoot, Idaho	
2021-08-03	Antonio King (22)	Black	Nashville, Tennessee	In the Antioch neighborhood, King entered a SmileDirectClub production facility and opened fire, non-fatally shooting a manager and two security guards. King was then shot and killed by responding police officers.
2021-08-03	Michael Tristian Paone (22)	White	Conshohocken, Pennsylvania	
2021-08-03	Ent Wright (76)	White	Waco, Texas	
2021-08-02	Name Withheld	Hispanic	Eagle Pass, Texas	

== See also ==
- Death in custody § United States
- Henry A. Wallace Police Crime Public Database
- List of cases of police brutality
- List of countries with annual rates and counts for killings by law enforcement officers
- List of law enforcement officers killed in the line of duty in the United States
- List of law enforcement officers convicted for an on-duty killing in the United States
- List of shootings by US immigration agents
- List of police reforms related to the George Floyd protests
- List of unarmed African Americans killed by law enforcement officers in the United States
- Lists of killings by law enforcement officers
- Police brutality in the United States
- Police misconduct § United States
- Police riot § United States
- Police use of deadly force in the United States
