= Bagley Brook =

River in Shropshire, England

Coordinates: 52.716°N 2.7506°W

Location
- Country: England
- Counties: Shropshire

Physical characteristics
- Source: Old Riverbed, adj. Ellesmere Road
- Mouth: culvert into River Severn
  - location: Chester Street, Shrewsbury
- Length: 2.0 km (1.2 mi)

The Bagley Brook is a small watercourse that flows into the River Severn at Shrewsbury in Shropshire, England.

Its course has been severely altered by urban development in the area, such that the brook is now little known or seen. However its name is used for an official area name - Bagley - which is an electoral division of the county council and a ward of the town council.

The brook follows to some extent the old course of the River Severn which was cut off from the course of the Severn at the last glaciation period. When the River Severn floods in a severe way, such as in November 2000, the area around the Bagley Brook also floods (about 20 hectares (49 acres)).

In present times, the watercourse starts roughly where the Ellesmere Road (the A528) crosses the old course of the Severn, and runs through the marshy area at first in a southeasterly direction, then a southerly direction. This area has been designated as an SSSI under the name Old River Bed, Shrewsbury.

It then runs through a cutting to the east of the Shrewsbury–Crewe railway line, eventually passing between a new housing development ("Ellesmere Grange") and a coal yard. It then enters a long underground culvert. The water discharges into the Severn at Chester Street, where the Gateway public building is, between Coton Hill and the town centre. Historically there was a bridge to carry the road over the brook, but the watercourse now flows through a culvert from the north of the Shrewsbury–Chester railway line straight into the river and cannot now be seen at Chester Street.
