= Bagley, Shrewsbury =

Area of Shrewsbury, England

Coordinates: 52.716°N 2.7506°W

Bagley
- Location within Shropshire
- Population: 4,621 (2011)
- OS grid reference: SJ494135
- Unitary authority: Shropshire
- Ceremonial county: Shropshire
- Region: West Midlands
- Country: England
- Sovereign state: United Kingdom
- Post town: Shrewsbury
- Postcode district: SY1
- Dialling code: 01743
- Police: West Mercia
- Fire: Shropshire
- Ambulance: West Midlands
- UK Parliament: Shrewsbury

Bagley is an area of Shrewsbury, county town of Shropshire. It is part urban, part rural and extends out from the town centre in a northwest direction. Though not clearly defined, it is often regarded as including Coton Hill, Greenfields and Gravelhill. The Shropshire Agricultural Showground is located between Coton Hill and Gravelhill.

Bagley is a Shropshire Council electoral division, which until 2009 included Coton Hill and the town centre of Shrewsbury. It now covers a smaller area, though includes the northern half of the Mount Pleasant housing estate. The same area covered by the electoral division also forms the town council ward of Bagley.

It is named after the Bagley Brook which flows through the area and into the River Severn at Chester Street. Parts of the area are prone to flooding. On a small estate in the area named Herongate the positioning of the old river can be seen.

As of 2009 a new housing development ("Ellesmere Grange") is taking place on former railway land off Ellesmere Road. In future further housing development is expected to take place in the Bagley area, on both brownfield and greenfield land.
