= A528 road =

Road in England and Wales

A528

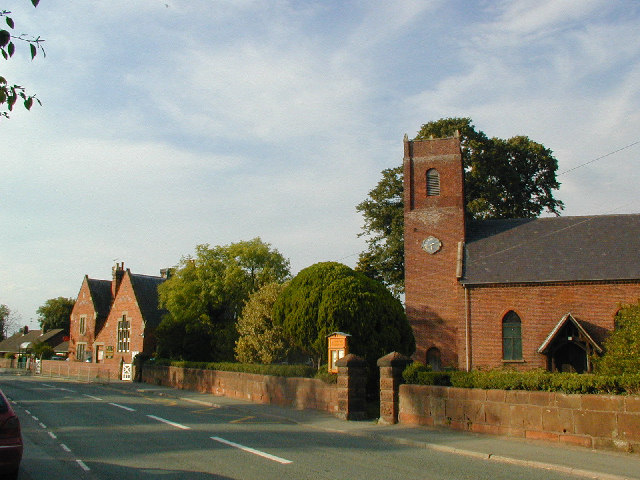
- The A528 at Cockshutt

Route information
- Length: 28 mi (45 km)

Major junctions
- North end: Marchwiel, Wrexham
- A525 A539 A495 A5124 A5191 A458
- South end: Shrewsbury, Shropshire

Location
- Country: United Kingdom
- Primary destinations: Overton, Ellesmere

Road network
- Roads in the United Kingdom; Motorways; A and B road zones

The A528 is a road that runs from Marchwiel, near Wrexham, in North Wales (53.0225°N 2.9597°W), to Shrewsbury, Shropshire, in England (52.7128°N 2.7512°W). On the way it passes through Ellesmere and Coton Hill. The road follows an old route that was Turnpiked in the 18th century.

== Route ==
The road starts 2.5 miles (4 km) south east of Wrexham at Marchwiel by a junction on the A525 road. It heads due south through Cock Bank and Overton Bridge before combining with the A539 road and going eastwards through the village of Overton-on-Dee.

It then heads south east through to Ellesmere, where it shares a small section of road with the A495, before heading south through Crosemere, Harmer Hill, Albrighton and intersecting with the A5124 at Harlescott north east of Shrewsbury.

The final short section into Shrewsbury goes over the Shrewsbury-Chester railway line and intersects with the A5191 in Shrewsbury town centre. A small stub going northwards only (due to the one-way system in Shrewsbury) starts off the A458 road.

== Safety ==
The A528 is one of Wales' riskiest and most dangerous routes. It is third behind the A44 and the A5 for the number of road casualties per year.
