= Summit Tunnel =

Railway tunnel near Todmorden, West Yorkshire, England

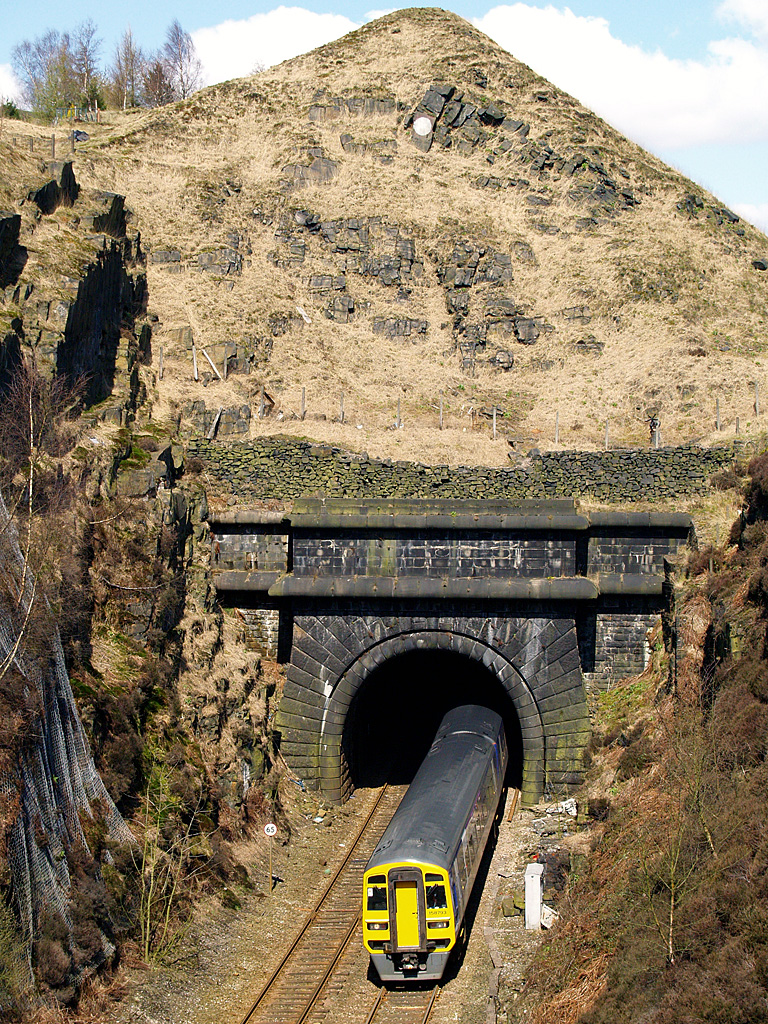
- Northern Rail Class 158 emerges from Summit Tunnel southern portal near Littleborough
- Interactive map of Summit Tunnel

Overview
- Line: Calder Valley line
- Coordinates: 53°41′02″N 2°05′31″W
- OS grid reference: SD940208
- Status: Open

Operation
- Opened: 1 March 1841
- Closed: 20 December 1984
- Reopened: 19 August 1985

Technical
- Design engineer: Thomas Longridge Gooch
- Length: 1 mile 1,125 yards (2.638 km)
- No. of tracks: 2
- Grade: 1-in-330 (southwards)

Summit Tunnel in England is one of the world's oldest railway tunnels. It was constructed between 1838 and 1841 by the Manchester and Leeds Railway Company to provide a direct line between Leeds and Manchester. When built, Summit Tunnel was the longest railway tunnel in the world.

The tunnel, between Littleborough and Walsden near Todmorden, was bored beneath the Pennines, a natural obstruction to most forms of traffic. The tunnel is just over 1.6 miles (2.6 km) long and carries two standard-gauge tracks in a single horseshoe-shaped tube, approximately 24 feet (7.2 m) wide and 22 feet (6.6 m) high. Summit Tunnel was designed by Thomas Longridge Gooch, assisted by Barnard Dickinson. Progress on its construction was slower than anticipated, largely because excavation was more difficult than anticipated. On 1 March 1841, Summit Tunnel was opened by Sir John Frederick Sigismund Smith; it had cost of £251,000 and 41 workers had died.

On 20 December 1984, the Summit Tunnel fire occurred. There were no deaths and five months later, the tunnel reopened after repairs. The tunnel has remained in continuous use with little interruption since it opened.

== Development ==
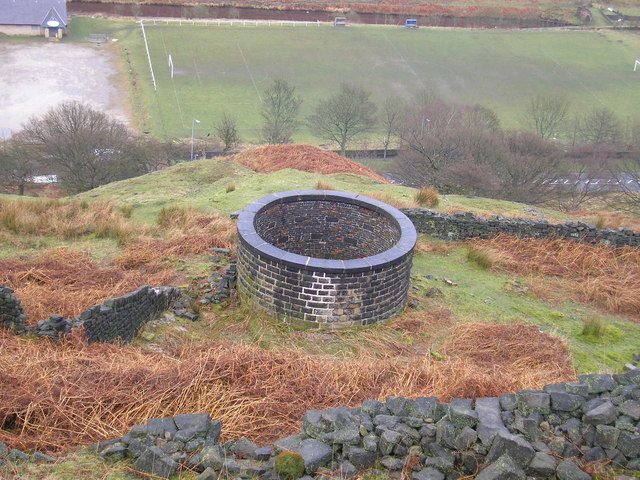
One of the tunnel's ventilation shafts, 2008

Summit Tunnel, between Littleborough and Todmorden is the highest section of the 51-mile (82 km) long Manchester and Leeds Railway, which was built parallel to the Rochdale Canal. When built, it was the world's longest railway tunnel and a critical element of the first trans-Pennine line.

The tunnel was designed by the civil engineer Thomas Longridge Gooch, a collaborator of George Stephenson and his son Robert Stephenson on several railway schemes. Between spring 1835 and 1844, Gooch was the engineer for the Manchester and Leeds Railway on behalf of George Stephenson, who was working on other projects. In September 1837, during Gooch's tenure, work commenced boring the tunnel. Gooch was assisted by Barnard Dickinson. When speaking about the tunnel, Dickinson exclaimed: "This tunnel will defy the rage of tempest, fire, war or wasting age".

The tunnel is 1 mile 1,125 yards (2.638 km) long and 22 feet (6.6 m) tall; the horseshoe-shaped bore is 26 feet (7.9 m) wide and accommodates a pair of tracks. The tunnel falls on a gradient of 1-in-330 southwards (towards Littleborough). It was driven by hand through shale, coal and sandstone, after which the walls were lined with six courses of brick, using more than 23 million bricks. The bricks were handmade locally and up to 60,000 were laid in a single day. Roman cement was used for its impermeability to water. It has been estimated that about 8,100 tonnes (dry weight) of cement was transported to the tunnel from Hull. During August 1838, James Wood, the chairman of the Manchester and Leeds Railway, laid the first brick in a ceremony.

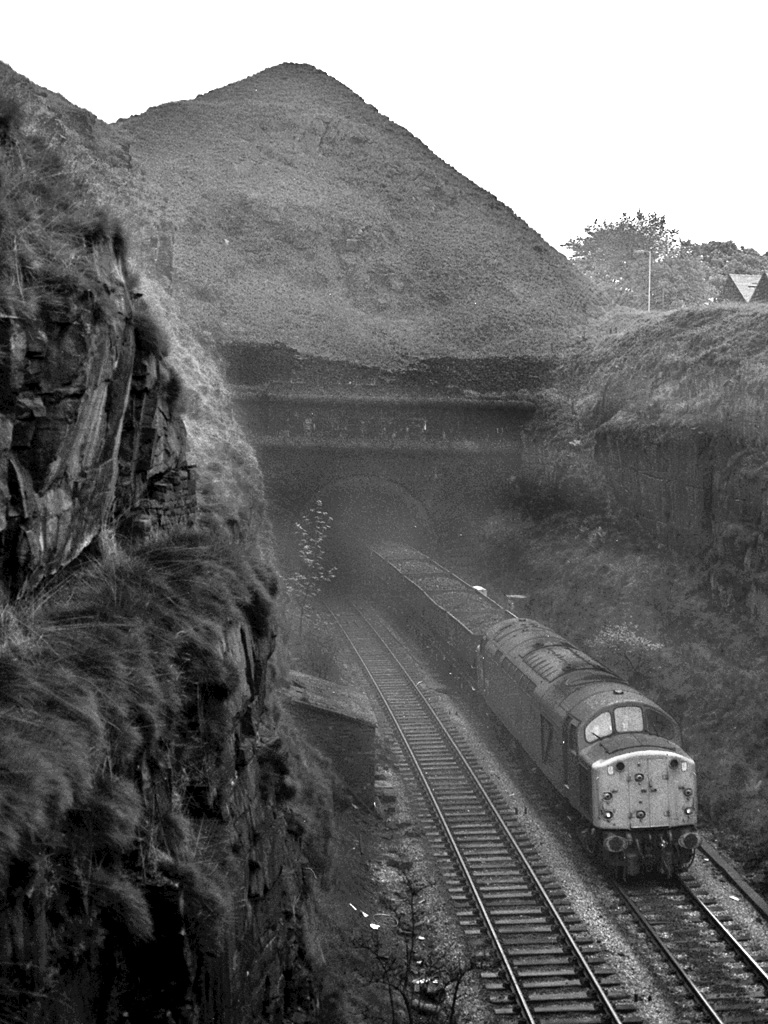
A British Rail Class 40 locomotive hauling a freight train through the tunnel, 8 June 1983

The original contractors were Evans, Stewart and Copeland. At the peak of construction, a workforce of between 800 and 1,250 men and boys was active, aided by about 100 horses and 13 stationary steam engines, which were used to remove material from the shafts. The bedrock was hewn using physical strength and hand tools, illuminated only by candlelight. At an early stage of track laying, the rails were laid directly onto excavated rock, but conventional wooden sleepers were also used. The spoil was used for other purposes, including in the construction of Blackpool Promenade.

Alignment of the tunnel was achieved by drilling 14 vertical shafts to provide survey points. When the tunnel was complete, two shafts were sealed and the remaining 12 were retained as ventilation. The ventilation shafts were up to 92 to 308 feet (28 to 94 m) deep. During the tunnel's service life, No.6 was sealed after rock falls.

Progress on construction was slower than expected; the bedrock and blue shale through which it was bored proved to be harder to excavate than anticipated. In March 1839, because of slow progress, the original contractors were dismissed and George Stephenson took over, after which the pace of work increased until a strike of the bricklayers occurred in March 1840. The last brick was laid on 9 December 1840.

Summit Tunnel should have opened on New Year's Eve 1840; but the opening was delayed after the discovery of a defective invert, 0.5 miles (0.8 km) from one end which had displaced the central track drain. After repairs, the tunnel was officially opened by Sir John Frederick Sigismund Smith, the government inspector of railways on 1 March 1841. Summit Tunnel cost £251,000 and the loss of 41 lives. The cost was far greater than the railway company expected.

The southern portal of the tunnel was grade II listed in 1986.

== Incidents ==
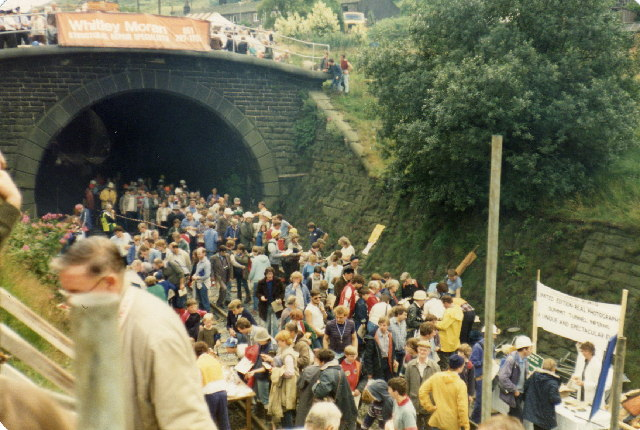
Public walkthrough of the Summit Tunnel days prior to its reopening to rail traffic, 17 August 1985

The tunnel closed for the first eight months of 1985 following a fire that generated sufficient heat to vitrify sections of its outer brickwork. The build up of heat in the surrounding ground led to a 'false spring'; many plants produced flowers and buds as the warm soil triggered new growth. Damage to the tunnel lining was minimal which was attributed to heated gases from the fire escaping through the ventilation shafts. Restoration involved replacing 550 yards (500 m) of track and sleepers before it re-opened to traffic on 19 August 1985.

On 28 December 2010, a passenger train travelling from Manchester to Leeds was derailed when it struck ice that had fallen onto the tracks from one of the ventilation shafts. The ice had built up during exceptionally cold weather and fell into the tunnel when it started to thaw. The train was the first to use the tunnel in three days as a result of a temporary break in services around Christmas. It collided with the tunnel wall, but remained upright and no injuries were reported.

== Sources ==
=== Bibliography ===
- Bairstow, Martin (2001). The Manchester & Leeds Railway : the Calder Valley line. Leeds: Martin Bairstow. ISBN 1-871944-22-8.
- Edmondson, Vikki; Sherratt, Fred; Roff, Richard; Levett, Andy (May 2018). "Advancing tunnelling: the Victorian engineering management legacy". Forensic Engineering. 171 (2). London: Institution of Civil Engineers. ISSN 2043-9903.
