= Coton Hill rail crash =

1965 train crash in Shropshire, England

Coordinates: 52°43′3″N 2°45′10″W

Details
- Date: 11 January 1965
- Location: Coton Hill, Shropshire
- Country: England
- Line: Shrewsbury to Chester Line
- Cause: Overspeed on incline

Statistics
- Trains: 2
- Passengers: 0 (goods train)
- Deaths: 1 (signalman)
- Injured: 1

The Coton Hill rail crash was a train crash which occurred on 11 January 1965, at Coton Hill, near Shrewsbury in Shropshire, England.

It happened when a heavily loaded freight train ran out of control on the 1 in 100 Hencote incline, and was derailed on a set of trap points, eventually demolishing a signal box. The signalman on duty was killed, and the driver of the train seriously injured.

== The accident ==
At approximately 05:50, the 03:56 Saltney to Pontypool Road freight train, formed of Class 47 diesel locomotive D1734 with 46 wagons, weighing a total of 775 tons, was approaching Coton Hill. At the top of the Hencote downhill gradient, freight trains of Class 5 (modern equivalent Class 7) such as this one were required to obey a stop sign, but the train passed the sign and entered the Coton Hill goods loop at speed.

Despite emergency brake applications being made, the train eventually derailed on the trap points at the exit of the goods yard and continued for a further 70 yards before finally crashing into the Coton Hill South signal box, destroying it completely. The first 11 wagons followed the locomotive, but the destruction of the signal box opened a set of points which sent 24 further wagons into a siding, where they derailed and some collided with a second Class 47 diesel which was waiting to leave the yard. The destruction was widespread and the cleanup operation was further hampered by hydrochloric acid leaking from a damaged wagon. Normal service was not restored until 14 January.

== The inquiry ==
The Department of Transport inquiry found that, due to the damage caused to the locomotive and train (the locomotive was later scrapped, despite being only 8 months old), it was impossible to ascertain whether a brake failure had impaired the driver's ability to stop the train. However, the driver was found to be responsible for the accident, as had he stopped at the top of the incline, as was required, he would have been able to stop the train even if a brake failure had occurred. The driver did not have any recollection of the accident, and it was thought logical that he had assumed that the points were set for the main line and not the goods loop.

When the locomotive was being broken up some months later, it was found that its Automatic Warning System (AWS) equipment had been isolated, despite appearing to be in working order. The driver would therefore have had no warning that the points were set for the goods loop ahead, though given the failure to stop, this would probably not have prevented the accident.

== See also ==
- Shrewsbury rail accident - happened in 1907 a few hundred metres south of Coton Hill.
