= Old River Bed, Shrewsbury =

Protected area in Shropshire, England

Coordinates: 52.729639°N 2.748213°W

Old River Bed, Shrewsbury is a Site of Special Scientific Interest located two miles north of Shrewsbury town centre, to the east of the A528 in Shropshire, England. It is currently owned and managed by Shrewsbury Town Council. In February 2025 a pair of Eurasian beavers were introduced to the site to help manage the encroaching willow scrub by making the area wetter than the willow prefers.

The site is designated as a SSSI as it forms part of the former bed of the River Severn, which has been cut off from the main course of the river since the last glaciation. The Old River Bed is of particular value for the extensive sedge fen which now fills this cut-off meander of the River Severn. Although differing in its mode of origin, the Old River Bed is complementary to other wetland sites in North Shropshire.

Wetland plant species found at the Old River Bed include:

- Lesser pond-sedge - Carex acutiformis
- Common reed - Phragmites australis
- Great reedmace - Typha latifolia
- Water horsetail - Equisetum fluviatile
- Meadowsweet - Filipendula ulmaria
- Soft rush - Juncus effusus
- Sharp-flowered rush - J. acutiflorus
- Water avens - Geum rivale
- Bottle sedge - Carex rostrata
- Brown sedge - C. disticha
- Marsh cinquefoil - Potentilla palustris
