= Walsden =

Village and civil parish in West Yorkshire, England

Coordinates: 53.69486°N 2.100265°W

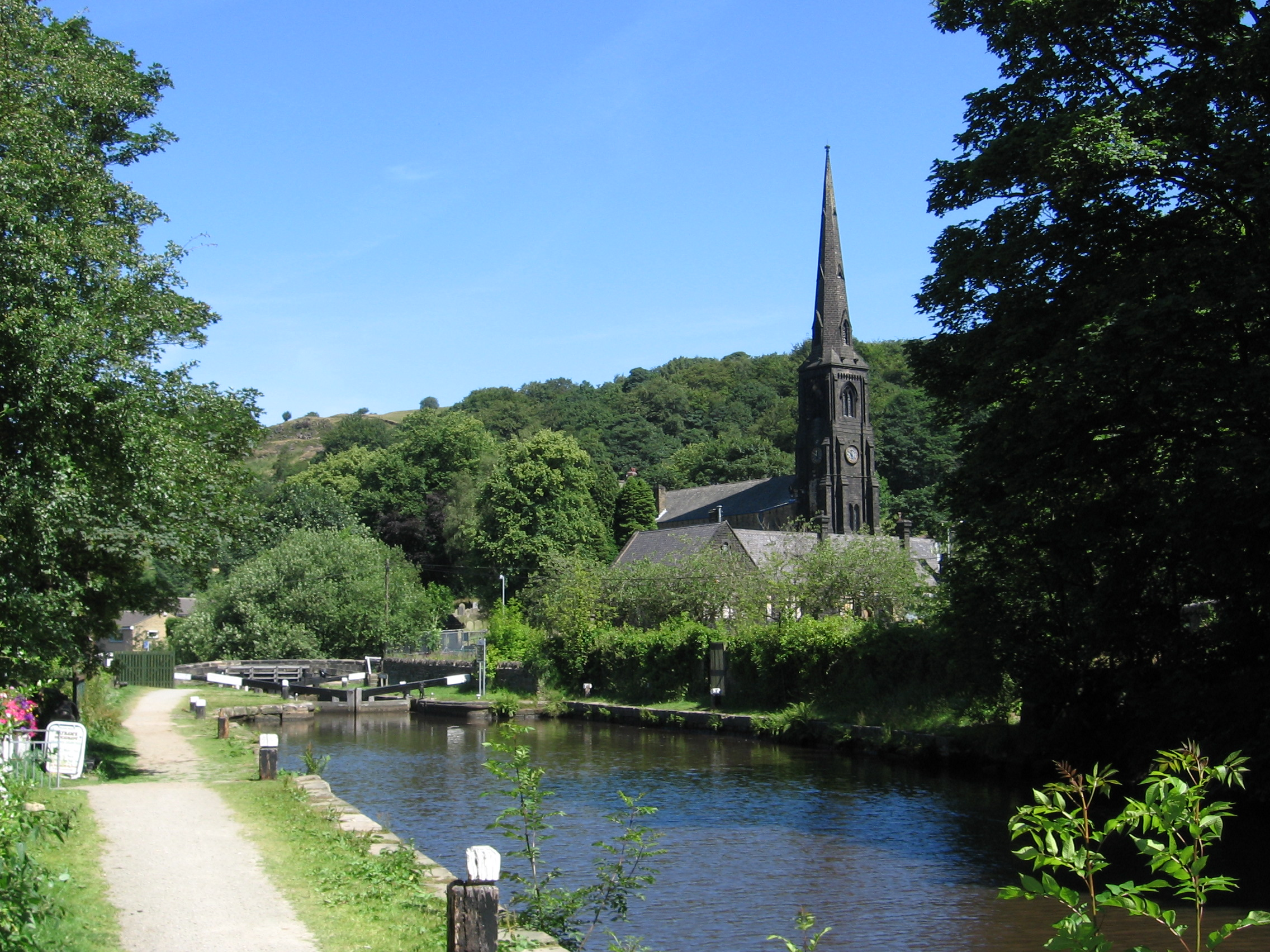
- Travis Mill Lock and St Peter's Church, Walsden

- Location within West Yorkshire
- OS grid reference: SD934220
- Civil parish: Todmorden
- Metropolitan borough: Calderdale
- Metropolitan county: West Yorkshire
- Region: Yorkshire and the Humber
- Country: England
- Sovereign state: United Kingdom
- Post town: TODMORDEN
- Postcode district: OL14
- Dialling code: 01706
- Police: West Yorkshire
- Fire: West Yorkshire
- Ambulance: Yorkshire
- UK Parliament: Calder Valley

Walsden (/ˈwɒlzdən/; WOLZ-dən) is a large village in the civil parish of Todmorden in the Metropolitan Borough of Calderdale, West Yorkshire, England.

It was historically partially administered in Lancashire (the Walsden Water as tributary to the Calder serving as the county boundary), and close to the modern boundary with Greater Manchester. It lies along the A6033 Keighley to Littleborough road in the Walsden Valley, a branch of the Upper Calder Valley, and is 2 miles (3.2 km) south of Todmorden and 4 miles (6.4 km) north of Littleborough.

== Overview ==
Walsden railway station, on the Leeds—Todmorden—Manchester line, originally opened in 1841 and re-opened 10 September 1990, having been closed for almost 30 years.

The canal and A6033 between the former Bird in'th Hand pub and the Bellholme football pitches was also the only place to be bombed in Todmorden during the Blitz; the blasts breached the Rochdale Canal and broke a water main on Rochdale Road.

Multiple small craters can still be picked out on both hillsides, one of which contains the Summit Tunnel trans-Pennine railway line, which may have been an alternative target for a raid primarily aimed at the Manchester area; its easterly Yorkshire end is less than ¼ mile away.

The road was quickly repaired, the canal was shored up with earth from the former floodplain of Walsden Water (which is why the pitches are above the natural ground level) and the whole bombing incident was hushed up.

Walsden was originally administered by Rochdale corporation in the county palatine of Lancashire, hence some of the local historical archives are held by Rochdale MBC.

The village sits wholly within West Yorkshire with boundaries to Greater Manchester (south by southwest) and Lancashire (west by northwest)

Although Walsden is the common name given to the area it is made up of numerous hamlets (as is commonplace to the region).

Warland, Bellhome, Bottomley, Lanebottom, Deanroyd, Bottoms, Allescholes, Birkswood, Ramsden, Henshaw, Hollins and Copprashouse are all part of what is now generally referred to as Walsden.

== Governance ==
Walsden is a village in the civil parish of Todmorden and the Todmorden ward of Calderdale, a metropolitan borough within the ceremonial county of West Yorkshire in England.

== Etymology ==
Walsden's name is of Anglo-Saxon origin meaning "Valley of Foreigner" or "Valley of he who is Foreign". Foreign refers to the Celtic Britons who lived in West Yorkshire at the time of the Anglo Saxon Petty Kingdoms. Thus, it has the same root as Wales and as Wallonia in Belgium. It has been said in the past that it comes from "Wolves' Den", this is dismissed as a folk etymology.

== Religion ==
The Parish Church is St. Peter's (Church of England), originally constructed between 1846 and 1848. The Grade II listed spire of 1864 is all that remains of the Victorian church, which was devastated by fire on 28th May 1948. The rest of the building was reconstructed and reconsecrated in 1956, so that the nave now has a number of mid-century architectural features. As of 2025, the building is closed due to safety concerns, but the congregation continues to meet elsewhere in the village.

The church has an associated school nearby, Walsden St Peter's CE (VC) Primary School.

== Sport ==
Walsden has a cricket club that plays in the major Lancashire Leagues.

== Notable residents ==
- Nobel Prize in Physics recipient Sir John Cockcroft was born and brought up here, living on Birks Lane.
