= Shropshire County Show =

Coordinates: 52°42′56″N 2°45′49″W

The Shropshire County Show, formerly and to now often called the West Mid Show (short for Shropshire and West Midlands Show), is an annual agricultural show held on the outskirts of Shrewsbury (at Coton Hill), England, established in 1875.

It has its own showground – the Shropshire Agricultural Showground, which lies on the north bank of the River Severn in a rural setting (though it is less than a mile from Shrewsbury town centre). The showground is accessed via Berwick Road, the B5067.

The show is held usually in May and has attracted as many as 40,000 people, from across the region.

On 7 November 2009 the Shropshire and West Midlands Agricultural Society, which ran the show, ran into financial difficulties, all staff were made redundant with immediate effect. In early 2010 a Company Voluntary Agreement was negotiated. By the end of 2014 the debts had been reduced by two thirds and the trustees were therefore able to start investing in the infrastructure of the showground. With the support of newly appointed sponsors Greenhous, a local car dealership and servicing company, there is a renewed confidence that the showground will continue.

The society is now run by trustees with a recently appointed full-time Showground Director.

Aside from the highly successful show in 2012, there are events at the Showground on most weekends, including a new separate Horse Show, The mid-Shropshire Vintage Club Show, November Bonfire, and The Shrewsbury Folk Festival. There are also regular, well-attended car boot sales that are held on Sunday mornings.

The showground is also used for camping. It is the nearest camp site to the middle of Shrewsbury.

There were cancellations from 1915 to 1918 (during World War I), 1940 to 1945 (during World War II) and 2020 (during the COVID-19 pandemic).
