= Coton Hill, Shropshire =

Coordinates: 52.716°N 2.754°W

Coton Hill
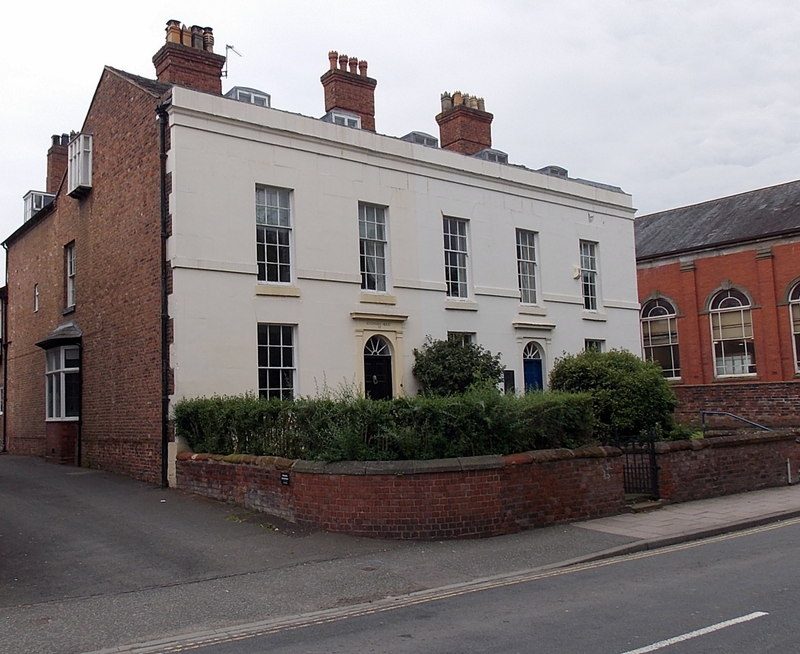
- Housing in Coton Hill

- Location within Shropshire
- Population: 1,500 (approx)
- OS grid reference: SJ492134
- Unitary authority: Shropshire
- Ceremonial county: Shropshire
- Region: West Midlands
- Country: England
- Sovereign state: United Kingdom
- Post town: Shrewsbury
- Postcode district: SY1
- Dialling code: 01743
- Police: West Mercia
- Fire: Shropshire
- Ambulance: West Midlands
- UK Parliament: Shrewsbury

Coton Hill is a suburb of Shrewsbury, Shropshire, England. The River Severn flows to the west, and Bagley Brook, the original river bed of the Severn, to the east.

== History and development ==
The area is believed to have been populated before the Norman Conquest, and its occupants were described as being cotters (a smallholder or peasant farmer).

Coton Hill had an unusual number of public houses in proximity to each other, thanks to being on the historic route from Ellesmere and Chester. Pubs include the Woodman Inn, Bird in Hand, Royal Oak and Severn Apprentice. The Severn Apprentice closed in 2009 and was later gutted by fire, with the site it occupied being redeveloped for housing.

A strangely named passage exists in the old former village – "Pig Trough". The Shropshire Agricultural Showground is just outside Coton Hill, and this is used once a year, usually in May, to hold the Shropshire County Show.

Council houses were built in the suburb after the First World War. These were to number 195, but in the end only 70 were built, with the project being completed in 1924.

== Transport ==
During the 19th century the area became a centre for railway freight and two huge yards grew up in the area (Coton Hill North and Coton Hill South), on the Shrewsbury to Chester Line. Although the line is still running passenger and some freight services, only one of these yards still exists and it was disused for a long time. In 2015, freight trains started running from the yard again, carrying stone from Bayston Hill (which is transported from the quarry south of Shrewsbury to Coton Hill by lorry) to destinations including Theale and Tinsley in Sheffield. A serious rail crash occurred at Coton Hill South in January 1965.

== Notable people ==
- Coton Hill was the birthplace in 1653 of 17th century admiral John Benbow,
- Edward Williams, antiquary, died at Coton Mount on Coton Hill in 1833.
- William Wingfield, cricketer, died at Coton Hill in 1913.
- Hugo Botstiber, Austrian musicologist, died at Cotonhurst on 15 January 1941 only a few months after arriving in Shrewsbury. Being of Jewish origin, he had emigrated from Vienna in 1938.

== See also ==
- Bagley Brook
- Bagley
