= Thomas Longridge Gooch =

British civil engineer (1808–1882)

- Born: 1 November 1808; London
- Died: 23 November 1882 (aged 74); Newcastle upon Tyne
- Parent(s): John Gooch; Anna Longridge
- Engineering career
- Discipline: Civil engineer
- Employer(s): Liverpool and Manchester Railway; Manchester and Leeds Railway

Thomas Longridge Gooch (1 November 1808 – 23 November 1882) was civil engineer of the Manchester and Leeds Railway from 1831 to 1844.

== Biography ==
Gooch was born on 1 November 1808. He was the eldest son of John and Anna Gooch. John was cashier at the Bedlington Ironworks in Northumberland. Anna was the daughter of Thomas Longridge, whose family ran the ironworks and played an important role in the earliest steam railways. John and Anna had ten children, and of their five sons, four became railway engineers: Thomas Longridge Gooch; John Viret Gooch; Daniel Gooch and William Frederick Gooch.

On 6 October 1823, Gooch was apprenticed for six years to George Stephenson; with Stephenson, he surveyed the Newcastle and Carlisle Railway and for 2 1/2 years from 1826 acted as Stephenson's secretary and draughtsman on the Liverpool and Manchester Railway (L&MR), living in Stephenson's house in Liverpool. When work on the L&MR was suspended due to opposition in Parliament, Stephenson allowed Gooch to spend a few months at Edinburgh University, studying chemistry and geology. In January 1829, he became Resident Engineer for the Liverpool end of the L&MR, but in April the same year he took a temporary appointment as Resident Engineer of the Bolton and Leigh Railway.

In 1830, Stephenson was appointed to survey the route of the proposed Manchester and Leeds Railway, and Gooch was appointed his assistant. Gooch carried out most of the actual surveying for the new line, and was in charge of the construction. He subsequently resigned from the company due to "chicanery" by the directors.

In the 1840s, he worked alongside Robert Stephenson as engineer of the Trent Valley line and the North Staffordshire Railway. He retired from engineering in 1851 due to health problems (probably due to overworking), having made over £40,000 during his time in the profession.

=== Assessment ===
Railway historian Jack Simmons considered that Gooch was "one of the most reliable railway engineers of the 1840s", praising his teamwork, humility, honesty, and "selfless devotion to his work". His diary and unpublished autobiography, a valuable source on early railway engineering, have been preserved by the Institution of Civil Engineers. Their obituary said that "in the exciting days of the railway mania his name was prominent and ranked second only to that of the Stephensons and Brunel, and had health allowed him to continue his active career, he would doubtless have achieved the fullest honours which the profession could bestow."
