= Delancey, New York =

- Hamlet
- Location within New York Location within the United States
- Coordinates: 42°12′20″N 74°58′15″W
- Country: United States
- State: New York
- County: Delaware
- Elevation: 1,309 ft (399 m)
- Time zone: UTC-5 (Eastern (EST))
  - Summer (DST): UTC-4 (EDT)
- ZIP code: 13752
- Area code: 607
- GNIS feature ID: 948101

Delancey (also spelled De Lancey, DeLancey, or Delancy) is a hamlet in Delaware County, New York, United States. The community is 5.7 miles (9.2 km) south-southwest of Delhi. Delancey had a post office until January 3, 2004. Delancey’s ZIP code is 13752.

Train station and train in Delancey, NY in 1908
