= Cross Country services =

Cross Country services on the British rail network carry passengers between regions on routes avoiding London termini.

== History ==
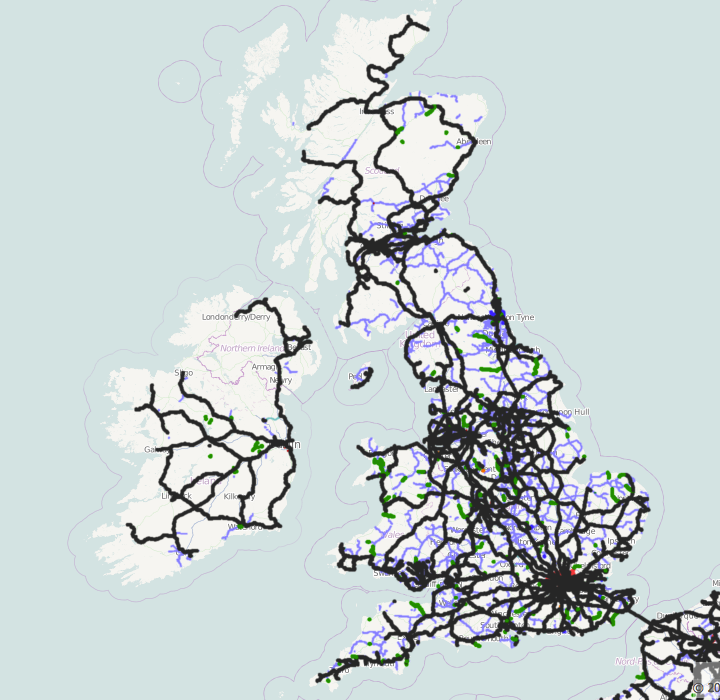
Current mainline railway lines in Ireland and the United Kingdom are shown in black, heritage lines in green, subway lines in red and former railway lines in light blue

=== Background ===
The world's first twin-track inter-urban passenger railway in which all the trains were timetabled and ticketed was the Liverpool to Manchester Railway. This line, in 1830, greatly reduced journey times between the two cities and provided a major freight link. This captured the mind of venture capitalists and led to many more Railways in the United Kingdom than operate today. This was at a time when those cities were separated by a bumpy and circuitous road bypassing Chat Moss with divergent main industries: shipping of goods/materials and shipbuilding in the case of Liverpool and textile mills in Manchester thus in economic terms this line can be considered inter-regional. The first cross-country route avoided requiring co-operation between existing operators however still connected rival operators' tracks to the same terminus city, London, and was the Lancashire and Yorkshire Railway's Manchester and Leeds Railway which was constructed in 1847.

=== Early inter-regional co-operation ===
As railway building rapidly accelerated the role of the capital city grew and lines tended to radiate from it with companies attempting to restrain other operators from constructing railways within their particular directional sector or narrow territory. (Note: For instance the Alton Light Railway was a deliberate plan to thwart a Cross Country line to Portsmouth, as was the Buxton Line to thwart a complete line through Derbyshire to Manchester.) However, as railways surged in many directions to new destinations it became increasingly difficult to stop completely major incursions into envisaged territory, instead of total resistance, co-operation to mitigate the impact such incursions often yielded better results for passengers and operators - with interchange stations between such rival operators such as in Birmingham and Westbury, Wiltshire providing for wider connections.

Although a few major railways were partially used by Cross Country services by process of agreement, most cross-operator services formed an exclusive complementary service by being involving two railways in series, i.e. each as a continuation of the next.

A highly successful and economically cohesive example of this was the West Coast Main Line which worked in conjunction with Portpatrick and Wigtownshire Joint Railway and another in Scotland to timetable services from London Euston to the Belfast ferry at Stranraer.

During the 1920s the Liberal and Labour Governments identified unacceptable railway costs, with more than 100 operators, and a national interest desire to achieve better economies of scale led to major statutory Grouping in 1923 almost wholly into the Big Four. (Note: The Great Western Railway, the London and North Eastern Railway, the London, Midland and Scottish Railway and the Southern Railway; see also 1923 - 1947: The Big Four.) This for instance made the Lancashire and Yorkshire Railway by law become subsumed into the London, Midland and Scottish Railway, one of these four. As such Cross Country services from an early slight blossoming in the 1880s were free to develop within and even across these four regions, without fear of facing intense competition to strategic routes.

=== Major cooperation ===
Inspired by such a radical reform, the Aberdeen to Penzance Through Service a distance of 785 miles (1256 km), covering 477 miles (768 km) as the crow flies was inaugurated on 3 October 1921 and briefly used the track of seven different railway companies. The service was maintained by adding or removing the through coaches from trains already running on the routes: one coach of North British Railway stock, was added to an Aberdeen-London express, and was detached from it at York, where the train was made up with the addition of more coaches and sleeping cars to complete the journey.

During the 1930s, when competition from the roads became fierce and with the growth of the permission of week-long holidays and coastal resorts, trains were being operated from the North of England to the South Coast, and from and through the Midlands to other resorts on the east and west coasts. Trains usually one of the leading Big Four companies consisted of rakes of coaches and were hauled by locomotives that were sometimes changed when crossing from one company to another.

=== Post re-privatisation ===
As before the statutory Grouping of 1923 in today's slightly less fractured rail system Cross Country routes instead necessitate commercial negotiation and cooperation between the operating companies as such services cross from one company's operating area to others.

== Current Cross Country services ==
Franchises are granted periodically on a territorial basis so present a degree, as in the United States, of monopoly in many regions however Britain has a significant overlap of areas providing for certain competition, such as on the West Coast Main Line and several joint ventures exist to provide inter-regional direct routes spanning the areas of more than one of these franchise zones. Examples of the cross-country services operating currently or in the recent past include:

- The Cross Country Route (CrossCountry): since 1921. Penzance and for main summer holiday days other resorts of Cornwall–Birmingham–Sheffield–Leeds–Newcastle upon Tyne–Edinburgh–Aberdeen.
- South Coast–Birmingham–Northern England and Scotland (CrossCountry): Bournemouth–Reading–Birmingham–Manchester (Extended regularly to Edinburgh via Newcastle before the change of CrossCountry franchise in 2007)
- TransPennine Express routes: Liverpool–Manchester–Newcastle, Manchester–Sheffield–Hull, and Manchester–Edinburgh and Glasgow via the Lake District
- West Wales–Manchester route (Transport for Wales): Carmarthen–Cardiff–Hereford–Shrewsbury–Crewe–Manchester
- East–west route (East Midlands Railway): Liverpool–Manchester–Birmingham–Nottingham–Peterborough–Stansted Airport–Norwich
- North Downs Line (First Great Western): Reading–Guildford–Redhill and Gatwick Airport (on the Brighton Main Line)

Historically:

- South West–Birmingham–the North West (CrossCountry): Penzance–Birmingham–Glasgow direct (ceased after the change of CrossCountry franchise in 2007)
