= Battle of the Îles Saint-Marcouf =

1798 battle of the French Revolutionary Wars

- Part of the French Revolutionary Wars
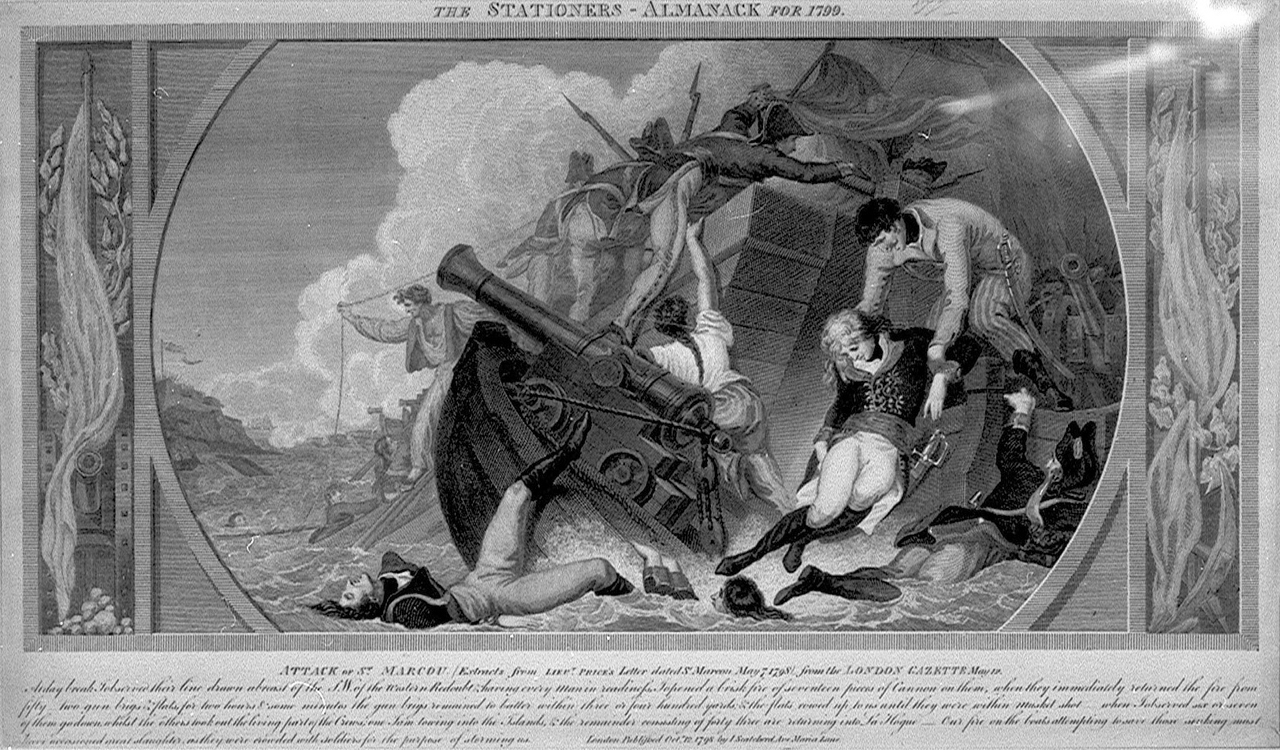
- 1798 engraving of the battle
Date	7 May 1798
Location	Îles Saint-Marcouf 49°29′35″N 1°9′45″W
Result	British victory

Belligerents
Great Britain	France

Commanders and leaders
Charles Price	A. M. Muskein

Strength
500	5,000–6,000; 52 vessels

Casualties and losses
1 killed 4 wounded	900 killed or drowned 300 wounded 500 captured 6–7 vessels sunk

The Battle of the Îles Saint-Marcouf was fought off the Îles Saint-Marcouf on 7 May 1798 during the French Revolutionary Wars. Dislodging a British garrison on the islands was the main objective for French forces. The garrison (which had been in place since 1795) allowed the islands to serve as a resupply base for Royal Navy ships patrolling northern French waters. Apart from expelling the British, the French sought to test new equipment and tactics, which had allegedly been developed with an intention of invading Britain.

On 7 May, French forces launched a massed amphibious assault on the southern island, using over 50 landing ships and hundreds of troops. The island's 500-strong garrison was compelled to resist the attack alone; although significant Royal Navy forces were in the area, a combination of wind and tides prevented them from intervening. Despite the superior numbers of the French attackers, the operation was a complete failure. The landing ships were exposed to heavy British fire, from both shore batteries and musket fire. This fire precluded the landing of any French soldiers, and killed nearly 1,000 of them in the landing ships.

As the landing force retreated, British fire from the smaller island to the north inflicted further losses on the French. British casualties were negligible. Following the failure of the French operation, British forces began a close blockade of the Cotentin ports, where the surviving landing craft were anchored. A month after the battle, this strategy resulted in a secondary success for the British when a French frigate and corvette were intercepted and defeated by the blockade squadron.

== Background ==
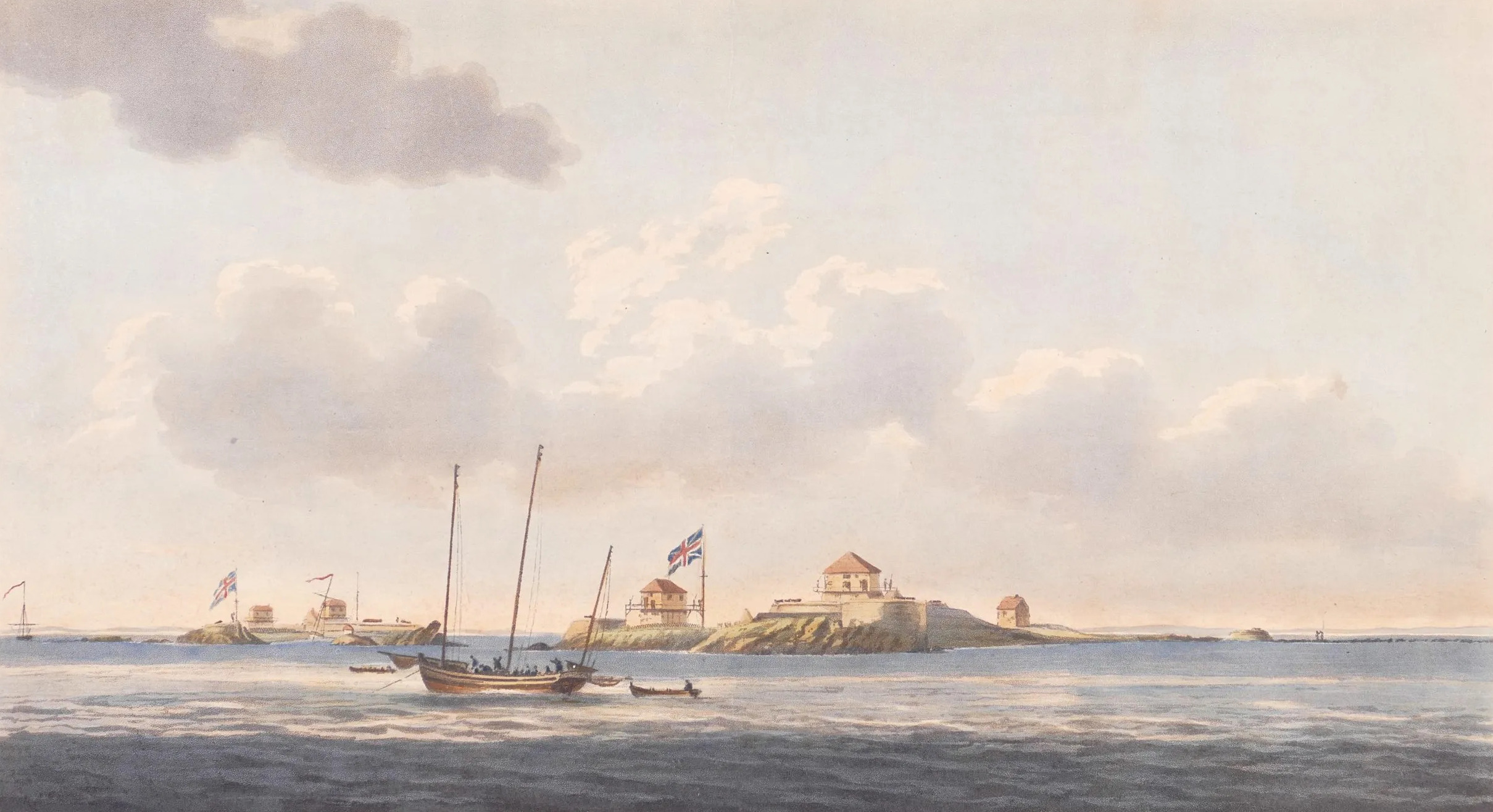
1798 engraving of the islands under British occupation

Throughout the French Revolutionary Wars, British warships patrolled the French coast, intercepting and destroying French maritime traffic and blockading French ports. In 1795 Captain Sir Sidney Smith, a prominent Royal Navy officer, recognised that if resupply points could be established on islands off the French coast then cruising warships could extend their time at sea. To this purpose, Smith occupied the uninhabited Îles Saint-Marcouf, which lie 3.5 nautical miles (6.5 km; 4.0 mi) off Ravenoville on the Cotentin Peninsula in Normandy. Smith constructed barracks and gun batteries and manned the islands with 500 sailors and marines, including a large proportion of men unfit for ship-board service, described as "invalids". The Glengarry Fencibles offered to provide a garrison, but after the French captured Smith this fell through.

The Royal Navy regularly supplied the Îles Saint-Marcouf with food from Britain, and visiting vessels brought bags of earth that allowed the development of a vegetable garden. Smith supported the islands with several gun vessels, including the converted hoys Badger, Hawke, and Shark, the fireship Nancy, and the Musquito-class floating battery Sandfly, which he had had purpose-built for the defence of the Îles Saint-Marcouf. Lieutenant Charles Papps Price, captain of Badger and an unpopular officer who had repeatedly been passed over for promotion, commanded the British occupation; Price spent most of his time on the islands with a prostitute he had brought from Portsmouth.

Since the 1796 French victory in Italy over the Austrians, pressure had been growing in France for direct action against Britain. Command of an army deployed in Northern France and named the Army of England was initially given to Divisional-general Napoleon Bonaparte, but later passed to Divisional-general Charles Edward Jennings. Bonaparte and then Jennings prepared for an invasion of Britain, and Frigate Captain A. M. Muskein, a naval administrator from Antwerp and veteran of the Battle of Svensksund, was instructed to develop a suitable fleet of landing barges to convoy the troops across the English Channel. The French Directory commissioned the Swedish shipwright Fredrik Henrik af Chapman to design the landing barges, and by 1797 vessels designed by him were being built along the northern French coast under Muskein's supervision: French soldiers nicknamed the boats "bateaux à la Muskein" (English: Muskein-type boats).

In April 1798, Muskein was ordered to prepare a squadron of his barges for an attack on the Îles Saint-Marcouf. The operation was intended simultaneously to eradicate the British garrison and restore French control of the raiding base, test the effectiveness of the barges in a military amphibious operation, and focus British naval attention on the English Channel and away from Bonaparte's preparations at Toulon for the planned French invasion of Egypt. On 7 April 1798, Muskein sailed from Le Havre with 33 barges under the command of General Point, but on 8 April he found his passage blocked by the British frigates HMS Diamond under Captain Sir Richard Strachan and HMS Hydra under Captain Sir Francis Laforey. At 16:00 the frigates cornered the barges in the mouth of the River Orne and opened fire, but Diamond grounded soon afterwards and, although the frigate was brought off after darkness, neither side was able to inflict serious damage.

On 9 April the French flotilla was able to leave the Orne River and anchor in the harbour of Bernières-sur-Mer, but the arrival of the fourth rate HMS Adamant under Captain William Hotham persuaded Muskein to return to the more sheltered anchorage at the mouth of the Orne. As he returned eastward, he again came under fire from Diamond and Hydra. The French flotilla then sheltered under the batteries at Sallenelles until the damage was repaired. Over the next two weeks, however, the situation changed – Counter-admiral Jean-Baptiste Raymond de Lacrosse at Cherbourg had been informed of Muskein's difficulties and sent reinforcements of 40 barges and armed fishing ships to Sallenelles. Late in April, Muskein had an opportunity to escape without interception by the British force offshore and sailed as far as Saint-Vaast-la-Hougue, to the west of the islands. There he waited for the right combination of wind and tide to allow the attack to go ahead uninterrupted by the British squadron that had followed his flotilla westwards.

== Battle ==
On 6 May the conditions for Muskein's attack were perfect: the calm winds prevented the British warships intercepting his flotilla, and the weak tides prevented disruption of his craft by heavy waves. The British also were aware of the conditions necessary for the attack, and made swift preparations to arm the batteries and line the shore with marines. A small boat from the islands watched as Muskein's force rowed out of Saint-Vaast-la-Hougue and steadily approached the islands during the evening. The sixth rate HMS Eurydice under Captain John Talbot and the brig HMS Orestes under Commander William Haggitt, had joined Adamant, which was stranded 6 nautical miles (11 km) away from the islands by the calm. Despite strenuous efforts, the three vessels would not be able to reach the islands in time to take part in the action.

At midnight, the island's boat signaled the approach of the French and Price readied the defences. Muskein's force mustered 52 vessels, including a number of brigs that mounted several large cannon and were intended to provide covering fire for the landing barges, which each carried one smaller cannon. The main body of the attacking troops numbered between 5,000 and 6,000 French soldiers drawn largely from coastal defence units based around Boulogne. Unwilling to risk a night attack, Muskein waited until dawn, using the remaining cover of night to draw his craft in formation facing the western defences of the southern island. The brigs lay 300 yards (270 m) offshore, behind the landing barges whose approach they would cover during the attack. As dawn broke, Muskein ordered the advance and the brigs and barges opened fire on the British defences.

The West Island's batteries, which were under Price's command, consisted of 17 cannon: four 4-, two 6-, and six 24-pounder long guns, and three 24-, and two 32-pounder carronades. Although eight of the guns were relatively light, the batteries inflicted devastating damage on the light invasion craft. Despite severe casualties the French barges continued their approach until they were within musket range, 50 yards (46 m). The garrison of marines opened fire and the artillery crews switched to canister shot. Six or seven French vessels sank along with their crews and embarked troops, while several others were heavily damaged. Losses were so high that the French called off the attack; even so, the return journey carried the barges past East Island, which was under the command of Lieutenant Richard Bourne of Sandfly and mounted a battery of two 68-pounder carronades, massive guns that inflicted additional severe losses. Although Hotham's squadron made desperate efforts to reach the battle, the wind was too light and they were only able to chase the remaining ships back into Saint-Vaast-la-Hougue.

== Aftermath ==
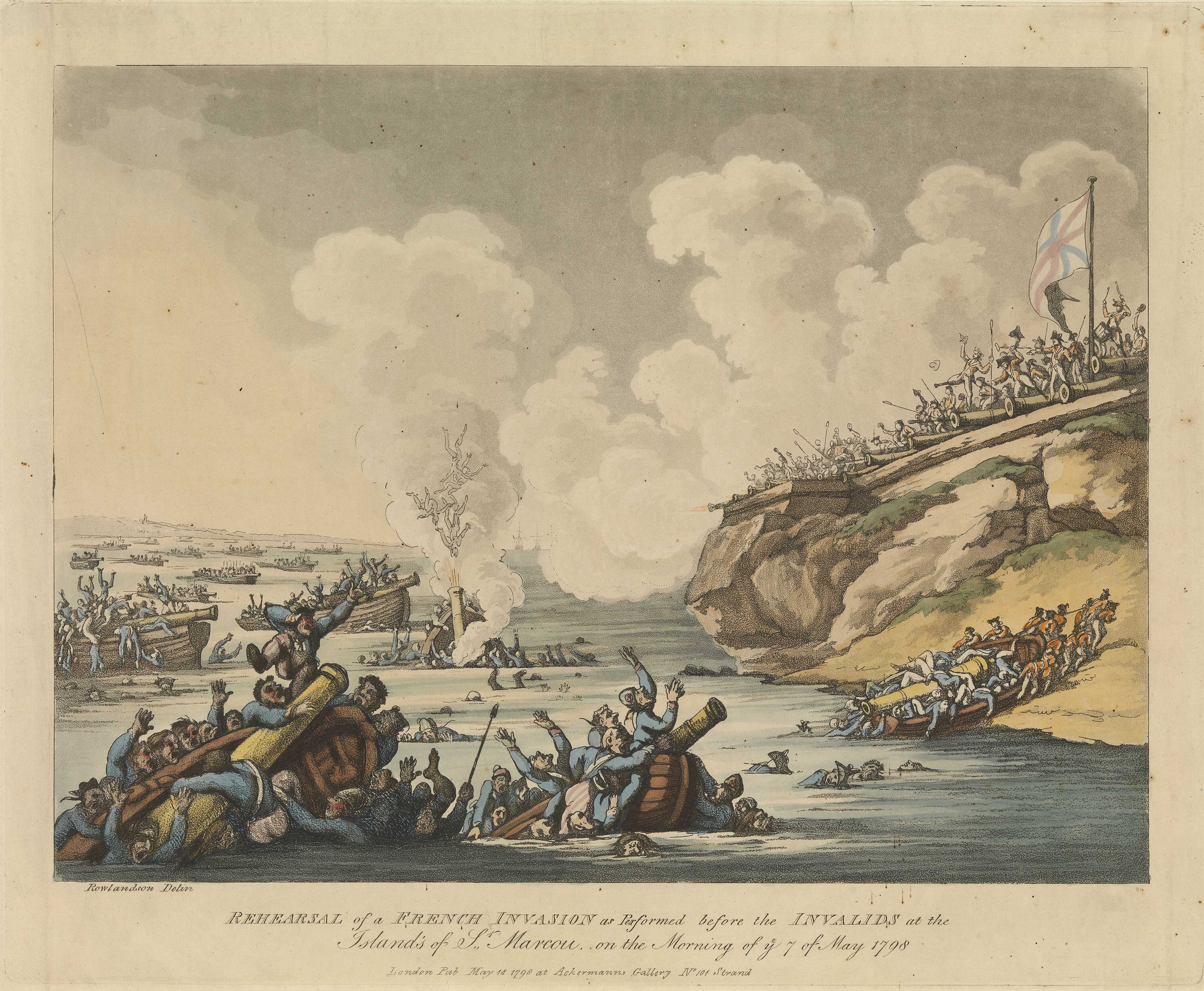
Political cartoon by Thomas Rowlandson mocking the French defeat

The battle was a disaster for the French. According to unofficial accounts, they lost approximately 900 men killed or drowned and at least 300 wounded, in addition to the loss of a number of the newly constructed landing craft. In France, Étienne Eustache Bruix, the newly appointed Minister of the Navy and the Colonies, ordered a second attempt on the islands soon afterwards. However, the French Directory, which did not want the embarrassment of a second disastrous attack, immediately countermanded the orders. Instead, Lacrosse gave orders for most of the surviving ships to be sent to Cherbourg, detachments later reaching Saint Malo and Granville. Muskein was ordered to return to Le Havre with the remainder.

In Britain the successful defence of the islands was highly praised and Price was promoted as a reward, although Bourne was not, despite a recommendation in the official report. British losses included a single marine killed and four other servicemen wounded. The victory was seen in Britain as a foreshadowing of the likely fate of an attempted invasion and helped ease British fears about the threat of a French amphibious attack. Nearly five decades later the Admiralty issued the Naval General Service Medal with clasp "Isles St. Marcou" upon application to all British participants then still living.

The British strengthened the islands' defences, in case of further attacks, and a number of warships patrolled the area to observe French movements and intercept any flotillas of invasion craft. At the action of 30 May 1798, this strategy achieved an unexpected success when HMS Hydra intercepted the French corvettes Confiante and Vésuve off the mouth of the river Dives. The British drove Confiante ashore and boarding parties later burnt her. The islands remained under British occupation without any further French attacks until 1802. The Peace of Amiens returned the islands to French control; throughout the Napoleonic Wars of 1803–1815 they remained French, protected by a significant garrison.
