= HMS Serpent (1794) =

History

Great Britain
- Name: HMS Serpent
- Acquired: 1794
- Fate: Sold c. 1802

General characteristics
- Type: Hoy
- Tons burthen: 57 bm
- Length: 64 ft 10 in (19.76 m) (overall); 55 ft 1 in (16.8 m) (keel)
- Beam: 13 ft 11 in (4.24 m)
- Depth of hold: 6 ft 6 1/2 in (1.994 m)
- Propulsion: Sails
- Complement: 30
- Armament: 1 × 24-pounder gun + 3 × 32-pounder carronades

HMS Serpent was a former Dutch hoy that the British Admiralty purchased in 1794 for service with the Royal Navy. She was paid off in 1796 and was sold around 1802.

== Service ==
The Admiralty had Serpent fitted out between April 1794 and April 1795 at Woolwich, commissioning her in April 1794 under Lieutenant John Lundin.

Smith assigned all his gunvessels to the defence of the Îles Saint-Marcouf, which are some three and a half miles from the French coast and about nine miles south-east of Cape La Hogue, and which consist of two islands, West and East. The gunvessels and the shore batteries and redoubts the British erected on the islands were initially under the overall command of Lieutenant Henry Hicks of Hawke, and then under Lieutenant Charles Papps Price in Badger.

On 7 September the French mounted an attack with 17 large boats filled with men. They retreated in confusion after coming under fire from the redoubts the British had erected on East Island and from the gunvessels, among them the hoys Badger, Shark and Hawke, and the Musquito-class floating battery Sandfly. Subsequently, material from Serpent was used to build a battery.

== Fate ==
Serpent was paid off in 1796.

On 4 July 1802 orders were received at Portsmouth for the hired armed cutter Swan, among a number of other vessels including Bulldog and Serpent, to be put in commission. The Serpent in question was probably this Serpent, Serpent (1789) being already in service on the Cork station. Bulldog may have been Bulldog, which had been a powder hulk in Portsmouth since her recapture from the French in 1801, and which was broken up in 1829. Neither the hoy Serpent nor Bulldog were in fact recommissioned.

The hoy Serpent was sold around 1802.
