= HM hired cutter Rose =

Between 1793 and 1805, five cutters served the British Royal Navy as hired armed vessels under the designation HM hired cutter Rose:

== French Revolutionary Wars ==
=== Rose (1793–1801) ===
- Rose, of 55 tons (bm) and armed with eight 3-pounder guns, served under contract between 22 March 1793 and 28 November 1801.

On 15 September 1794, a court martial acquitted Lieutenant Walker of Rose of charges that he had taken money from merchants for protection of the trade between Leghorn and Bastia.

On 26 February 1795 Rose and Lieutenant Walker captured the French privateer Terrible.

On 28 September 1795 Rose, Captain William Walker was passing Capraria on her way from Leghorn to Bastia when at 4:30 am she encountered three French lateen-rigged privateers. Rose had thirteen men and a boy on board, and each of the privateers probably had 40 or more men. Rose was carrying three passengers, one a King's Messenger, and two ladies, and £10,000 in specie. Lieutenant Walker decided to attack the largest of the three privateers, which was a little away from the other two. Rose was able to rake the privateer with two broadsides, each gun being triple shotted. The privateer struck, and Lieutenant Williams ordered her captain not to attempt to escape. He then succeeded in sinking one of the remaining two privateers; the third sailed away. Rose was not in a position to rescue any survivors from the privateer that sank. The privateer that struck had one 6-pounder gun and four 1-pounder swivel guns in her bow, as well as 12 brass blunderbusses on her sides. She had a crew of 42 men, 13 of whom were killed in the action. The privateer that sank had a crew of 56 men, and the one that escaped had a crew of 48 men. Rose had only one man injured. The British battened their prisoners below deck on the privateer and towed her to Bastia, where they arrived two days later. Unfortunately for Lieutenant Walker, for unknown reasons his official letter never made it into the London Gazette and so he did not receive the recognition his action deserved.

On 31 May 1800 the hired cutters Rose, Lieutenant Henry Richardson, and Dolphin sailed to reconnoitre the creeks and harbours between Cape Barfleur and Cape La Hogue at the behest of Commander Charles Papps Price on HMS Badger at the Îles Saint-Marcouf. At 04:30 they observed a small cutter and set off in chase. An hour later they captured their quarry about three or four leagues NW of Cape Barfleur. She was the French privateer Risque a Tout, armed with two 4-pounder guns and small arms, with a crew of 16 men under the command of M. Jacques Neel. She was only 10 hours out of Cherbourg and had not taken anything.

On 22 November Rose, Lieutenant Richardson, arrived at Portsmouth in a shattered state. The previous day, as she was returning from Marcou, she encountered a French privateer of 10 guns off Dungeness. After a two-hour engagement the French privateer sailed away; Rose was unable to pursue.

=== Rose (1794–1800) ===
- Rose, of 9689/94 tons (bm) and ten 4-pounder guns, was hired on 22 November 1794.

On 11 October 1797 Rose, under the command of Lieutenant Joseph Brodie, participated in the Battle of Camperdown. Before the battle she scouted the Texel and brought back intelligence to Admiral Duncan on the Dutch fleet. During the battle she served to repeat signals. After the battle, Admiral Duncan despatched her to London to bring the first word of the successful outcome of the battle.

On 12 February 1798 prize money resulting from the sale of Dutch ships captured on 11 October 1797 was due for payment. In 1847 the surviving members of the crews of all the British vessels at the battle qualified for the Naval General Service Medal with the clasp "Camperdown".

Rose was under the command of her master, Mr. Richard Stephenson, when she made the following captures in 1798:

20 April: De Twie Gie Brooders, Norwegen, De Joanna Elizabeth, and Jonge Ary Van Letten
21 April: Langeland
2 May: Die Gertrude et Petronella

On 29 April 1798 Rose captured the Flemish fishing vessel Zoomer.

On 28 May Rose was among the many vessels (all of which were part of the fleet under the command of Admiral Duncan) that shared in the proceeds of the capture of Janus.

Next, many of the same vessels, including Rose, shared in the capture several more Dutch vessels:

Hoop (6 June);
Stadt Embden (11 June);
Neptune (12 June);
Rose and Endrast (14 June);
Hoop (15 June); and
Vrow Dorothea (16 June).

Rose was among the vessels that shared in the proceeds of the capture of Adelarde on 18 August .

On 13 October 1800 Rose was under the command of Lieutenant Smith when the Dutch gun vessel De Adder captured her off Wattum in the River Ems. (Note: Adder was built in 1796 at the naval yard at Harlingen 1796, and was sold to be broken up 1810. She had a crew of 16-20 men and was armed with 3-5 guns.)

== Napoleonic Wars ==
=== Rose (1803–1804) ===
- Rose, of 525/94 tons (bm) and six 3-pounder guns, served under contract between 16 June 1803 and 12 December 1804.

Rose and Dolphin initially served at ship's tender to HMS San Josef and Salvador del Mundo. On 16 June 1803 Rose and Dolphin brought into Plymouth the Dutch East Indiaman Cornelius Maria. She had been sailing from Batavia to Amsterdam when the privateer schooner Catherine and Mary detained her. (Note: Catherine and Mary was a schooner of 80 tons (bm). She was armed with ten 4-pounder guns and had a crew of 45 men. Captain Thomas Goodall had acquired his letter of marque on 27 May 1803.)

On 24 June 1803 HMS Hydra and Rose captured the French privateer Phoebe. Phoebe, of four guns, two swivel guns, and 33 men, had left Cherbourg some seven days earlier. (Note: Phoebe had been commissioned in Cherbourg in 1800 with Guillaume Mosquerer, master. She made another cruise under François Folliot in 1800. French sources show her having departed in May or June 1803 with 28 men and 4 guns, and being captured by Hydra on 25 June.)

=== Rose (1804–1805) ===
- Rose, of 4444/94 tons (bm) and four 12-pounder carronades, served under contract between 26 May 1804 and 26 June 1805. She was renamed Harriet in 1804.
- Rose, of 10476/94 tons (bm), eight 12-pounder carronades, and two 4-pounder guns, served under contract between 4 July 1804 and 5 March 1805. She was renamed Beaumont in 1804.
