= HMS Dolphin (1801) =

Cutter of the Royal Navy

History

Great Britain
- Name: Dolphin
- Acquired: Hired 30 March 1793
- Fate: Sold 3 June 1801

United Kingdom
- Name: HMS Dolphin
- Acquired: By purchase 3 June 1801
- Fate: Sold 1802

General characteristics
- Type: Cutter
- Tons burthen: 92 12/94 (bm)
- Length: 58 ft 0 in (17.7 m) (overall); 43 ft 4 1/4 in (13.2 m) (keel)
- Beam: 20 ft 0 1/2 in (6.1 m)
- Depth of hold: 8 ft 6 in (2.6 m)
- Sail plan: Cutter
- Complement: 35
- Armament: As hired vessel: 8 × 3-pounder guns + 4 × 12-pounder carronades As naval vessel: 6 × 3-pounder guns + 4 × 12-pounder carronades

HMS Dolphin was 10-gun cutter that served the Royal Navy from 1793 to 1802, first as a hired armed cutter, and then after the Navy purchased her, as HMS Dolphin. During her almost decade of service Dolphin patrolled the English Channel protecting British trade by capturing French privateers and recapturing their prizes.

== Hired armed cutter Dolphin ==
On 30 March 1793, the Royal Navy hired the Dolphin cutter. However, one month later, on 30 April 1793, the Dolphin cutter, Richard Norwood, master, of 92 tons (bm), six 3-pounder guns, four cohorns, and 35 men, received a letter of marque. The relationship between these two vessels, if any, is an open question.

The hired armed cutters Dolphin and Charlotte recaptured the Mary on 25 May 1796.

On 24 February 1797, Sir John Colleton, Bart, commanding the hired armed cutter Swift, captured and sent into Dover the French privateer schooner Aventurier. (Note: Swift was on the Guernsey station. Colleton died in August 1801, aged 26.) The capture took place about four leagues NE of the South Foreland. Aventurier, of 40 tons (bm), had a crew of 11 men, armed with cutlasses and pistols. She had left Fécamp four days earlier but had captured nothing.

Dolphin had earlier boarded the cutter off Dungeness, but had let her pass. Sir John had initially done the same, believing her to be an American vessel sailing to London in ballast. However, after he left her, she changed her course and headed towards France. Sir John set out after the schooner, caught up with her, and boarded her a second time. This time he examined her more closely using a spit to probe her ballast. He found eight men, armed with pistols and cutlasses, concealed there with an air-hole barely large enough for them to breathe through.

Then in the evening of 2 (or 3) February 1797, the hired armed cutter Lion was off Dungeness Point, when she took possession of a French privateer sloop. Captor and prey were astern of a convoy that ranged to eastward. The privateer was the Requin, of Dieppe, armed only with muskets, and having a crew of 20 men. Lion was in company with Dolphin.

Almost a year later, on 20 January 1798, Lion and Dolphin recaptured Search.

Then one month later, on 28 February, the hired armed lugger Resolution was in company with Dolphin about three leagues WNW of Boulogne when they encountered and chased a French privateer lugger. They succeeded in capturing the Pou-Epie after a four-hour chase. She was armed with four swivel guns and small arms, and had a crew of 17 men. She was two days out of Dunkirk but had not captured anything. Mr. George Broad, the master of Resolution, sank the lugger as she was very leaky.

His Majesty's armed cutter Lord Duncan, Lion and Dolphin shared in the proceeds for the recapture of the brigs Triton and Search, on 26 March 1799.

Dolphin, followed this service by recapturing the brigs Albion and Nautilus on 30 August, and John and Eleanor on 17 November.

Dolphin was among the many vessels entitled to share in the proceeds of the Dutch fleet surrendered on 30 August 1799 in the Vlieter Incident.

On 31 May 1800 the hired cutters Rose and Dolphin sailed to reconnoitre the creeks and harbours between Cape Barfleur and Cape La Hogue at the behest of Commander Charles Papps Price on HMS Badger at the Îles Saint-Marcouf. At 04:30 they observed a small cutter and set off in chase. An hour later they captured their quarry about three or four leagues NW of Cape Barfleur. She was the French privateer Risque a Tout, armed with two 4-pounder guns and small arms, with a crew of 16 men under the command of M. Jacques Neel. She was only 10 hours out of Cherbourg and had not taken anything.

Dolphin arrived at Portsmouth on 16 June with the French privateers Genoa and Etrusot, which she had captured off the coast of France.

Eleven months later, on 20 April 1801, Fortunee, Trent, and Dolphin chased a privateer lugger for 10 hours before capturing it near St Aubin's Bay. The privateer was Renard, of Saint Malo, and pierced for 10 guns. She apparently had been a scourge of the British coasting trade. Dolphin was also in company when Fortunee captured the French privateer Masquerade on 5 May.

== HMS Dolphin ==
The Admiralty purchased Dolphin on 3 June 1801, and commissioned her in September as HMS Dolphin under the command of Lieutenant Thomas Shirley.

== Fate ==
The Admiralty offered Dolphin for sale on 30 June 1802. Dolphin sold in 1802 for £215.
