= HMS Hawke (1794) =

History

Great Britain
- Name: HMS Hawke or Hawk
- Acquired: by purchase under Admiralty Order of 3 February 1794
- Fate: Sold 1796

General characteristics
- Type: Hoy
- Tons burthen: 68 (bm)
- Length: 66 ft 10 in (20.37 m) (overall); 57 ft 9 5/8 in (17.6 m) (keel)
- Beam: 14 ft 10 1/4 in (4.528 m)
- Depth of hold: 7 ft 3 1/2 in (2.223 m)
- Propulsion: Sails
- Sail plan: sloop
- Complement: 30
- Armament: 1 × 24-pounder gun + 3 × 32-pounder carronades +

HMS Hawke was a former Dutch hoy, one of 19, that the British Admiralty purchased in 1794 for service with the Royal Navy. She seems to have participated in only one engagement against the French and was sold in 1796.

== Career ==
The Admiralty had her fitted out at Woolwich between April 1794 and April 1795, and Lieutenant John E.P. Sewell commissioned her in April 1794. Lieutenant Henry Hicks took command in 1795 and she joined Admiral Sir Sidney Smith's squadron.

Smith assigned all his gunvessels to the defence of the Îles Saint-Marcouf, which are some three and a half miles from the French coast and about nine miles south-east of Cape La Hogue, and which consist of two islands, West and East. The gunvessels and the shore batteries and redoubts the British erected on the islands were initially under Hicks and then under Lieutenant Charles Papps Price in Badger.

On 7 September the French mounted an attack with 17 large boats filled with men. They retreated in confusion after coming under fire from the redoubts the British had erected on East Island and from the gunvessels, among them the hoys Hawke, Badger, Serpent, and Shark, and the Musquito-class floating battery Sandfly.

== Fate ==
Hawke was fitted between October 1795 and January 1796. She was sold for £40 on 12 February 1796. However, she apparently became a storeship and sank at her moorings in Plymouth dockyard later that year.
