= HMS Lion =

Nineteen ships of the Royal Navy have been named HMS Lion or HMS Lyon, after the lion, an animal traditionally associated with courage, and also used in several heraldric motifs representing England, Scotland and the British Monarchy. Another ship was planned but never completed:

- English ship Lion (1509) was a 36-gun ship of the Royal Scottish Navy captured in 1511 and sold in 1513.
- English ship Lion (1536) was a 50-gun ship built in 1536 and on the navy list until 1559.
- English ship Lion (1547) was the Scottish ship Lion, captured in 1547 and later lost off Harwich.
- English ship Lion (1557) was a 40-gun ship, also known as Golden Lion. She was rebuilt four times, in 1582, 1609, 1640 and 1658. After her 1609 rebuild she was renamed Red Lion, but this was reverted to Lion after the 1640 rebuild. She was sold in 1698.
- HMS Lion (1665) was a 6-gun ketch, also known as Young Lion. She was captured from the Dutch in 1665, sold in 1667, repurchased in 1668 and sunk as a foundation at Sheerness in 1673.
- HMS Lion (1683) was a fifth rate captured from the Algerians in 1683 and sold the same year.
- HMS Lion (1702) was a 4-gun stores hoy of 99 tons burthen purchased in 1702. A French privateer captured her off Beachy Head in 1708, but she was recaptured in 1709.
- HMS Lion (1709 hoy) was a 4-gun hoy launched in 1709. She was wrecked in 1752.
- HMS Lion (1709) was a 60-gun fourth rate launched in 1709, rebuilt in 1738 and sold in 1765.
- HMS Lion (1753) was a transport launched in 1753, hulked in 1775, and sold in 1786.
- HMS Lyon (1753) was a hoy sold in 1786
- HMS Lion (1763) was a cutter purchased in 1763 and sold in 1771.
- HMS Lion (1774) was a discovery vessel in service from 1774 to 1785.
- HMS Lion (1777) was a 64-gun third rate launched in 1777, best known for ferrying the Macartney Embassy to China. She was used as a sheer hulk from 1816 and was sold for breaking up in 1837.
- HMS Lion (1781) was a schooner purchased around 1781 and sold in 1785.
- HMS Lion (1794) was a 4-gun gunvessel, originally a Dutch hoy. She was purchased in 1794 and sold in 1795.
- HMS Lion (1823) was the pirate schooner Gata, built in Baltimore in 1820, that the Royal Navy captured in 1823 and took into service. She took part in numerous expeditions against pirates, recaptured some of their prizes, and captured a slave ship. The Navy sold her in 1826.
- HMS Lion (1847) was an 80-gun second rate launched in 1847. She was converted to screw propulsion in 1859 and became a training ship after 1871. She was sold for breaking up in 1905.
- HMS Lion (1910) was a Lion-class battlecruiser launched in 1910 and sold in 1924.
- HMS Lion (1939) was to have been a Lion-class battleship. She was laid down in 1939, but work was suspended later that year, and again in 1942. The order was finally cancelled in 1945 and she was broken up on the slipway.
- HMS Lion (C34) was a Tiger-class cruiser launched in 1944 as the Minotaur-class HMS Defence. She was finally completed to a revised design in 1960. She was placed in reserve in 1964 and was scrapped in 1975.

== Battle honours ==
Ships named Lion have earned the following battle honours:

- Armada, 1588
- Cadiz, 1596
- Kentish Knock, 1652
- Portland, 1653
- Scheveningen, 1653
- Lowestoft, 1665
- Four Days' Battle, 1666
- Orfordness, 1666
- Schooneveld, 1673
- Texel, 1673
- Barfleur, 1692
- Ushant, 1747
- Santa Dorotea, 1798
- Guillaume Tell, 1800
- Java, 1811
- Heligoland, 1914
- Dogger Bank, 1915
- Jutland, 1916

== See also ==
- HMS Lioness
- Lyon's Whelp
- HMS Two Lions
- HM hired armed cutter Lion
