= HMS Shark (1794) =

History

Great Britain
- Name: HMS Shark
- Acquired: 1794
- Fate: Crew mutinied in 1795 and handed her over to the French

General characteristics
- Type: Hoy
- Tons burthen: 63 bm
- Length: 64 ft 8 in (19.7 m) (overall); 57 ft 4 1/2 in (17.5 m) (keel)
- Beam: 14 ft 3 1/4 in (4.3 m)
- Depth of hold: 6 ft 4 in (1.9 m)
- Propulsion: Sails
- Complement: 30
- Armament: 1 × 24-pounder gun + 3 × 32-pounder carronades

HMS Shark was a former Dutch hoy that the British Admiralty purchased in 1794 for service with the Royal Navy. In 1795 her crew mutinied and handed her over to the French.

== Service ==
The Admiralty ordered her purchase on 3 February 1794 and registered her on 7 March. She was commissioned under Lieutenant Charles Burlton in April.

In March 1795 Lieutenant Titus Allardyce replaced Burlton, and Shark joined Admiral Sir Sidney Smith's squadron. Smith assigned all his gunvessels to the defence of the Îles Saint-Marcouf, which are some three and a half miles from the French coast and about nine miles south-east of Cape La Hogue, and which consist of two islands, West and East. The gunvessels and the shore batteries and redoubts the British erected on the islands were under the overall command of Lieutenant Henry Hicks of the former hoy Hawke.

On 21 July 1795 Allardyce assisted Hicks in disciplining a boatswain's mate by the name of Shepherd who was neglecting his work on building a battery on one of the islands. This escalated into a situation that involved counter-charges and the confinement of Hicks, Allardyce, and Lieutenant James Gomm of Tickler. At some point thereafter Lieutenant John Watson replaced Allardyce. Smith would later write that he had treated the officers with great leniency.

On 7 September the French mounted an attack with 17 large boats filled with men. They retreated in confusion after coming under fire from the redoubts the British had erected on East Island and from the gunvessels, among them the hoys Badger, Serpent and Hawk, and the Musquito-class floating battery Sandfly.

Conditions on the islands were harsh, and there was also a great deal of unrest in the Navy at the time. As a result, there were several instances of desertion. On 18 September two seamen from Shark stole her jolly boat and deserted to the French.

== Fate ==
During the night of 11 December 1795 Shark's crew mutinied, imprisoned Watson, and handed her over to the French at St Vaast La Hougue.
