= HMS Sandfly (1794) =

Sloop of the Royal Navy

History

Great Britain
- Name: HMS Sandfly
- Ordered: 3 February 1794
- Builder: Wells & Co, Deptford
- Laid down: 1794
- Launched: 1794
- Completed: By 28 March 1795
- Honours and awards: Naval General Service Medal with clasp "Isle St. Marcou"
- Fate: Broken up in 1803

General characteristics
- Class & type: Musquito-class floating battery
- Tons burthen: 3063/94 (bm)
- Length: 80 ft 2 in (24.4 m) (overall); 56 ft 2 1/4 in (17.1 m) (keel)
- Beam: 32 ft 1 1/4 in (9.8 m)
- Depth of hold: 7 ft 11/2 in (2.3 m)
- Propulsion: Sails
- Sail plan: Topsail schooner
- Complement: 50
- Armament: Upper deck: 2 × 24-pounder guns; QD: 2 × 68-pounder carronades

HMS Sandfly was a Musquito-class floating battery of the Royal Navy. The two-vessel class was intended to defend the Îles Saint-Marcouf (Marcou) situated off the Normandy coast. During her brief career Sandfly shared in the capture of one privateer and participated in a battle that would earn her crew the Naval General Service Medal. The Peace of Amiens returned the islets to France in May 1802; Sandfly was paid off in June 1802 and broken up in 1803.

== Design and role ==
HMS Sandfly was one of two ships designed by Sir William Sidney Smith, the other being HMS Musquito, for deployment with his coastal squadron especially for the defence of the Îles Saint-Marcouf.

During her time in service, Sandfly was designated a sloop of 18 guns in order to increase her establishment. Sandfly acted as the "vessel of convenience" for mustering the marines and other troops on the East Island of St. Marcouf; HMS Badger acted in the same capacity for the West Island.

== Service ==
Sandfly was commissioned in February 1795 under Lieutenant John Chilcott; the British occupied the islands in July 1795. On 7 September the French mounted an attack with 17 large boats filled with men. They retreated in confusion after coming under fire from the redoubts the British had erected on East Island and from the gunvessels, among them the hoys Badger, Serpent, Shark, and Hawke. Lieutenant Richard Bourne replaced Chilcott on 12 February 1796. A year or so earlier he had served on both Musquito and Sandfly as a midshipman.

On 21 February 1797, Badger, Sandfly, and the hired armed cutters Champion and Fly captured the 16-gun chasse maree Souris. Unlike her sister ship Eclair, which the British had captured in 1795, the Royal Navy did not take Souris into service. (Note: Souris, was a chasse maree built in 1785 in southern Brittany for use as service craft in harbour construction at Cherbourg. Between October 1793 and January 1794, the French Navy converted her into a gun-vessel, originally of three 18 or 24-pounder guns, and commissioned her in February.)

In August Bourne was confirmed in his rank of lieutenant.

On 7 May 1798 the French made an attempt to capture the Marcou Islands. They sent a large flotilla of boats, including of 52 gun-brigs and flat-bottomed ones with troops), to mount the attack shortly before dawn. Lieutenant Charles Papp Price of Badger and Lieutenant Bourne of Sandfly mounted a successful defence during which the British destroyed a number of the attacking boats and captured and sent back one flat (landing craft). (Note: Although a number of records report that the British captured the gunvessel Flibustier, the letters from the action make no mention of this. Laws's history of the battle, the most thorough account, also makes no mention of this.) Price was in command of a battery of 17 guns - four 4, two 6, and six 24-pounder long guns, and three 24, and two 32-pounder carronades - on the West Island, while Bourne was in command of a battery on East Island that consisted of Sandfly's 68-pounder carronades. Bourne fired shells in support of Price's battery, which entailed firing over West Island. The French fired some 80 bow guns of 18 to 36-pounders for over two hours, but Price lost only one man killed and four wounded. The French lost some nine boats and sustained a large number of casualties from an attacking force that numbered an estimated 6–7,000 men.

Adamant (50 guns), Eurydice (24 guns), and Orestes (18 guns) were on the station, but were not in a position to render assistance. For their exertions both Price and Bourne received promotions to commander. In 1847 the Admiralty awarded the Naval General Service Medal with clasp "Iles St. Marcou" to the three surviving claimants from Badger and Sandfly.

Lieutenant Thomas Marco took over command in February 1799. Lieutenant Samuel Thomas replaced Marco in December that year.

== Fate ==
When the British returned the islets to France in mid-May 1802, after the Peace of Amiens, Sandfly was paid off in June. She was broken up in 1803.
