= John Wesley Wright =

Royal Navy officer

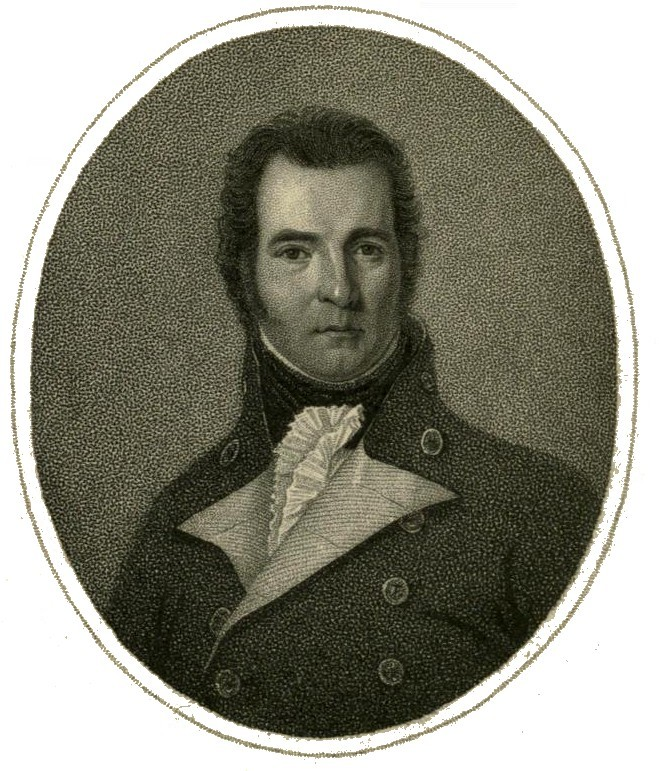
- Born: 14 June 1769; Cork, County Cork
- Died: 27/28 November 1805; Paris, France
- Military career
- Allegiance: Great Britain; United Kingdom
- Branch: Royal Navy
- Service years: 1781–1805
- Rank: Commander
- Conflicts: American War of Independence; Great Siege of Gibraltar; French Revolutionary Wars; Napoleonic Wars

Commander John Wesley Wright (14 June 1769 – 27/28 November 1805) was a Royal Navy officer who served in the American War of Independence and French Revolutionary and Napoleonic Wars. Wright's death in French captivity led to persistent accusations he was murdered by French authorities.

== Life ==
=== Early life ===
From a Lancashire family, he was born at Cork, Ireland on 14 June 1769, the son of James Wright. While still very young he went with his father and the family to Minorca, where he learnt music and French, in both of which he excelled. It may be presumed that he also learnt Spanish.

=== Early career ===
Early in 1781 he was entered on board the Brilliant with (Sir) Roger Curtis, and was for the next two years at Gibraltar during the Great Siege of Gibraltar. In 1783, when the Brilliant was paid off, Wright was sent to a school at Wandsworth, where he remained for two years. He was then employed for some time in a merchant's office in the city, and—apparently in 1788—was sent 'on an important commission' to St. Petersburg. He remained in Russia for the next five years, visiting Moscow and other places, and acquiring a thorough knowledge of the Russian language.

=== Naval career ===
He was introduced to Sir Sidney Smith, and at his request joined the Diamond in the spring of 1794 with the rating of midshipman, and apparently doing duty as captain's clerk for Smith, Wright seems to have described himself as 'the secretary of his friend.' After nearly two years on the coast of France, he was with Smith on the night of 18/19 April 1796, when both were taken prisoner. His confidential relations to Smith secured him the particular attentions of the French government; he was sent with Smith to Paris, was confined in the Temple as a close prisoner, was repeatedly examined as to Smith's designs, and finally effected his escape with Smith in May 1798. He then joined the Tigre, apparently as acting lieutenant, for his commission was not confirmed till 29 March 1800. He continued with Smith throughout the commission at Acre and on the coast of Egypt till promoted, on 7 May 1802, to the sloop Cynthia, which he took to England.

=== Recapture and death ===
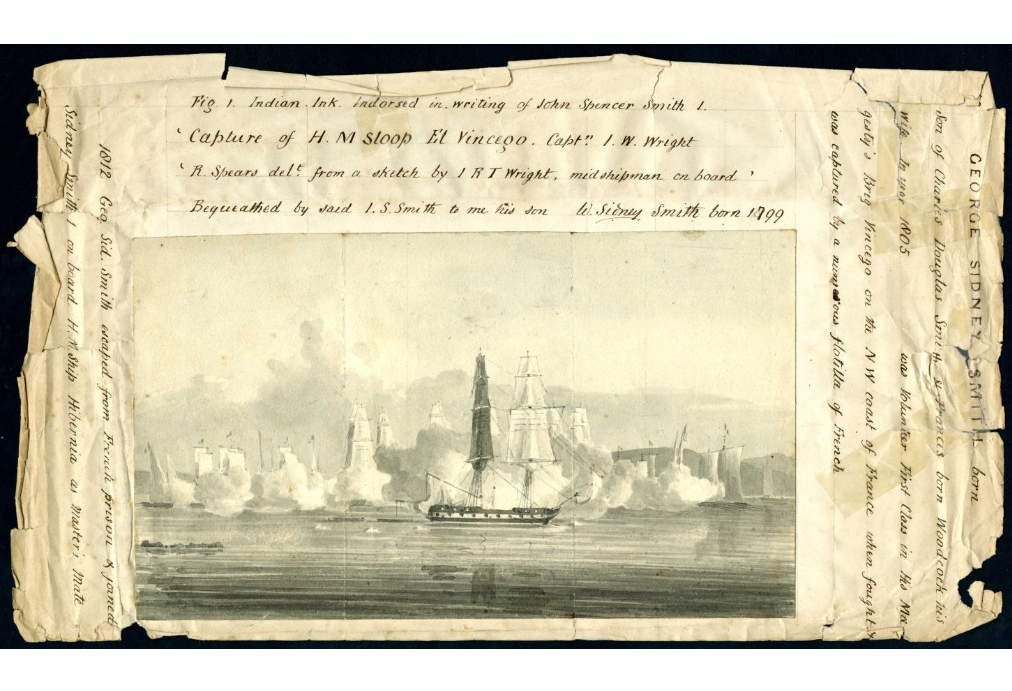
The capture of Vincejo on 8 May 1804

On the renewal of the war he was appointed to the brig Vincejo, in which for the next year he was employed on the coast of France. On the morning of 8 May 1804 he had been blown by stress of weather into Quiberon Bay, and was off the mouth of the Vilaine, when the wind died away. Some seventeen French gunboats came out of the river, and surrounded the brig, which the calm rendered almost defenceless against such odds; after being pounded for two hours, the brig was compelled to surrender. Wright was sent to Paris and again confined as a close prisoner in the Temple.

He was subjected to repeated examinations as to whether he had not put on shore in France some royalist agents: Georges, Pichegru, Rivière, and others were named. Wright refused to answer to the interrogations; and to this refusal he adhered, in spite of many threats of ill-treatment. After being detained for nearly eighteen months it was announced that he had committed suicide on the night of 27/28 October 1805. It was immediately said in England that if he was dead he had been murdered; and, in fact, so little was it believed by the British authorities that his name was not removed from the Navy List till the autumn of 1807.

=== Investigation ===
After the Restoration Sir Sidney Smith and others made unofficial inquiries in Paris which were claimed to prove that he was murdered. According to the evidence which Smith collected, the body was found on the bed with the sheet drawn up to the chin, the razor—with which the throat had been cut to the bone—closed, and the hand which grasped it pressing the thigh. There was some blood about the room, but none on the sheet. Great weight was attached to this and other stories but their evidential value is unclear. It has also been noted that his letters were in good and determined spirit, and no cause for any great depression was shown.

An alleged factor—the news of Mack's surrender at the Battle of Ulm—is said by some to absurd, especially to a naval officer who had also the news of Trafalgar. On the other hand, it is difficult to see what Bonaparte had to gain by murdering Wright. At St. Helena he pooh-poohed the idea, and said that if he had interfered it would have been to order Wright to be tried as a spy and shot, though nothing in the accepted laws of war would condemn an officer as a spy for landing men who might be objectionable to the enemy's government. In the total absence of trustworthy evidence, and the want of motive for either murder or suicide, it may be suggested that Wright died from natural causes—an affection of the heart, for instance—and that the French government took a mean revenge on the man who had given them a good deal of trouble by alleging suicide.
