= Musquito-class floating battery =

Class overview
- Name: Musquito class
- Operators: Royal Navy
- Preceded by: Firm class
- Succeeded by: Spanker class
- Planned: 2
- Completed: 2
- Lost: 1
- Retired: 1

General characteristics
- Type: Floating battery
- Tons burthen: 30622/94 (bm)
- Length: 80 ft 0 in (24.4 m) (gundeck); 56 ft 2 1/2 in (17.1 m) (keel)
- Beam: 32 ft 0 in (9.8 m)
- Depth of hold: 7 ft 10 in (2.4 m)
- Sail plan: Top-sail schooner
- Complement: 50
- Armament: Upper deck:2 × 24-pounder guns; QD: 2 × 68-pounder carronades

The Musquito class was a Royal Navy class of two 4-gun floating batteries built to a design by Admiral Sir Sidney Smith specifically to serve with his squadron in French coastal waters. Both were named and ordered under Admiralty Order 26 May 1794.

== Design and construction ==
Smith had the two vessels built with tapered, flat-bottomed hulls, so that they could go into shallow waters. For stability he had them fitted with three Shank sliding or drop keels (actually removable centreboards). Two of the keels were parallel and forward and the third was aft. (The Shank keels were the invention of naval architect Captain John Schank.)

Wells & Co. built both vessels at Deptford Dockyard in 1794 and launched them there that same year.

== Deployment ==
Musquito was based at the St Marcou islands and Sandfly was based at Jersey. After the loss of Musquito, Sandfly moved to St Marcou.

== Ships ==
=== Musquito ===
Musquito was commissioned in May 1795 under Lieutenant William McCarthy. A gale blew her out of the anchorage at the St Marcou islands and wrecked her on the French coast on 20 June 1795, with the loss of five lives, including McCarthy.

=== Sandfly ===
Sandfly participated in the Battle of the Îles Saint-Marcouf in 1798. She was paid off in 1802 and broken up in 1803.
