= HMS Badger (1794) =

History

Great Britain
- Name: HMS Badger
- Namesake: Badger
- Acquired: by purchase under Admiralty Order 3 February 1794
- Honours and awards: Naval General Service Medal with clasp "Isles St. Marcou"
- Fate: Sold 1802

General characteristics
- Type: Hoy
- Tons burthen: 59 (bm)
- Length: 61 ft 0 in (18.59 m) (overall); 54 ft 1 in (16.5 m) (keel)
- Beam: 14 ft 4 in (4.37 m)
- Depth of hold: 6 ft 2 in (1.88 m)
- Propulsion: Sails
- Sail plan: sloop
- Complement: 30
- Armament: 1 × 24-pounder gun + 3 × 32-pounder carronades +

HMS Badger was a Dutch hoy, one of some 19 that the Admiralty purchased for the Royal Navy in 1794 after France's declaration of war in 1793. The intent was to create quickly a class of gun-vessels for operations in coastal and shallow waters. Of all the hoys, she had probably the most distinguished career in that she helped fend off two French attacks on the Îles Saint-Marcouf, and participated in the capture of several French vessels. The Navy sold her in 1802.

== Career ==
Badger was fitted out at Deptford between April and 25 May 1794, with Lieutenant Lewis Mortlock commissioning her in April. In 1795 Captain Sir Sidney Smith seized the uninhabited Îles Saint-Marcouf, which lie 3.5 nautical miles (6.5 km) off Ravenoville on the Cotentin Peninsula in Normandy. Smith constructed barracks and gun batteries and manned the islands with 500 sailors and Royal Marines, including a large proportion of men unfit for ship-board service, described as "invalids". Smith supported the islands with several gunvessels, including Badger, Hawke, and Shark, and the floating battery Sandfly. Lieutenant Charles Papps Price assumed command of Badger in August 1795, with Mortlock moving to command of the newly captured and commissioned Crachefeu. For administrative purposes, the Navy rated Badger a sloop-of-war, and technically gave Price command of both the Saint-Marcouf islands.

Price was an unpopular officer who had repeatedly been passed over for promotion. He apparently spent most of his time on the islands with a prostitute he had brought from Portsmouth.

On 7 September 1795 the French mounted an attack with 17 large boats filled with men. They retreated in confusion after coming under fire from the redoubts the British had erected on East Island and from the gunvessels, among them the hoys Badger, Serpent, Hawk, and Sandfly.

On 28 December 1796, Badger and Sandfly captured Rebekah. Next year, on 21 February 1797, Badger, Sandfly, and the hired armed cutters Champion and Fly captured Souris. Souris was a chasse-maree of 16 guns. Unlike her sister-ship Eclair, which the British had captured in 1795, the Royal Navy did not take Souris into service. (Note: Souris, was built in 1785 in southern Brittany to assist in harbour construction at Cherbourg. Between October 1793 and January 1794, the French Navy converted her into a gun-vessel, originally of three 18 or 24-pounder guns, and commissioned her in February.)

Near the end of the year, on 12 November 1797, Badger and Sandfly captured the French vessels Eole and Solide Michael. One week later Badger captured Morgonstern.

On the night of 6 May 1798 the French approached the islands with a large number of armed troop-carrying barges and some brigs to provide covering fire, as well as 5-6,000 troops. They then launched their attack at dawn. The West Island's batteries, under Lieutenant Price, were ready and inflicted devastating damage on the light invasion craft. Despite severe casualties the French barges continued their approach until they were within musket range, 50 yards (46 m). The garrison of Royal Marines opened fire and the artillery crews switched to canister shot. Six or seven boats sank with their entire crews and troops, and others were heavily damaged. Losses were so high that the French called off the attack; even so, the return journey carried the barges past East Island, which was under the command of Lieutenant Richard Bourne of Sandfly and mounted a battery that inflicted additional severe losses. (Note: Although a number of records report that the British captured the gunvessel Flibustier, the letters from the action make no mention of this. Law's history of the battle, the most thorough account, also makes no mention of this.)

British casualties were light. For his efforts, Price received promotion to Commander. Nearly five decades later the Admiralty issued the Naval General Service Medal with clasp "Isles St. Marcou" upon application to the three still-living British claimants from the battle.

On 8 July 1799, Badger captured four French vessels: Pierre de Issigny, Fortunee, St. Pierre de Grandcamp, and Amitie.

What was Badger's last capture occurred on 15 September 1800 when Price sighted a French long cutter some four miles off the West Island. He sent Lieutenant M'Cullen of the Royal Marines with 24 picked men in Badger's ten-oared galley and six-oared cutter to catch the French vessel. He also signaled the gun-brig Sparkler to provide covering fire. Sparkler drew the fire of two shore batteries, one of two 24-pounder guns and one of two 12-pounder guns, while the boats went in to cut out the French vessel. The French crew ran their boat on shore and cut her masts and rigging. Nevertheless, the British towed her off despite heavy small-arms fire from the shore. The prize was the privateer rowboat Victoire, mounting four swivel guns, 26 oars, and having a crew of at least 40 men, under the command of Captain Barier. Price described her as "quite new... the completest Boat for the Service of the Islands that possibly could be constructed." The only British casualty was Badger's gunners mate, who took a musket ball to the shoulder. (Note: Victoire was a 49-tonne privateer from Dunkirk commissioned in 1798 under a Captain Terragno, with 18 men and 2 guns. Later in 1798 she was under Gaspard Malo. In 1799 she was under Ensign Jean-Louis Fromentin (from Dieppe) with 30 men. In 1800, under Étienne Commette (from Agde), with 24 to 40 men and 2 to 4 guns. Later in 1800, she cruised under Léonard-Louis Lerlière, with 24 to 40 men and 2 to 4 guns. HMS Badger, of 3 guns, captured her in July 1800.)

== Fate ==
Badger was paid off in May 1802 and was sold later that year.
