= HMS Lion (1709 hoy) =

Sloop of the Royal Navy

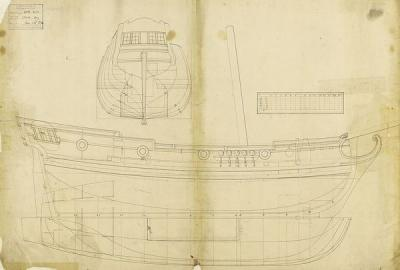
- Admiralty plan of the hoy Lyon, 1709

History

Great Britain
- Name: HMS Lion (or Lyon)
- Builder: Deptford Dockyard (M/Shipwright Joseph Allin)
- Launched: April 1709
- Fate: Wrecked 1752

General characteristics
- Type: Hoy
- Tons burthen: 107 92/94 (bm)
- Length: Overall: 63 ft 11 in (19.48 m); Keel: 50 ft 9 in (15.5 m)
- Beam: 20 ft 0 in (6.10 m)
- Depth of hold: 9 ft 0 in (2.74 m)
- Propulsion: Sails
- Sail plan: sloop
- Armament: 4 × 4-pounder guns + 4 × swivel guns

HMS Lion (or Lyon) was a stores hoy launched in 1709. She was wrecked at Port Isaac on 26 August 1752.

Lion was under the command of Samuel Wakerel, master. All of her crew was saved, as was some of her cargo of lumber.
