= Ravenoville =

- Part of Sainte-Mère-Église
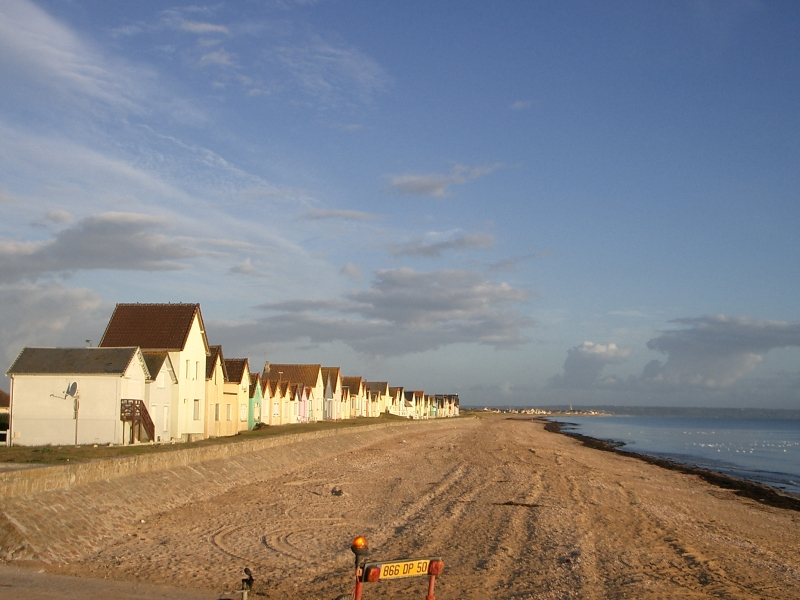
- Cabins along the beach
- Location of Ravenoville
- Location within France Location within Normandy
- Coordinates: 49°27′27″N 1°16′10″W
- Country: France
- Region: Normandy
- Department: Manche
- Arrondissement: Cherbourg
- Canton: Carentan
- Commune: Sainte-Mère-Église
- Area^{1}: 11.65 km^{2} (4.50 sq mi)
- Elevation: 10 m (33 ft)
- Highest elevation: 12 m (39 ft)
- Lowest elevation: 0 m (0 ft)
- Population (2022): 229
  - Density: 19.7/km^{2} (50.9/sq mi)
- Time zone: UTC+01:00 (CET)
  - Summer (DST): UTC+02:00 (CEST)
- Postal code: 50480
- ^{1} French Land Register data, which excludes lakes, ponds, glaciers > 1 km^{2} (0.386 sq mi or 247 acres) and river estuaries.

Ravenoville (French pronunciation: [ʁavnovil]) is a former commune in the Manche department in north-western France. On 1 January 2019, it was merged into the commune Sainte-Mère-Église.

== Geography ==
Ravenoville is divided into 2 towns: Ravenoville-Bourg and Ravenoville-Plage. A sinuous route of about 1.25 miles through the pastureland of Normandy links them.

== History ==
Ravenoville, close to Utah Beach, on the evening of June 5, 1944 and throughout the day of June 6, 1944, lived through the Allied D-Day landing.

== See also ==
- Communes of the Manche department
