= Îles Saint-Marcouf =

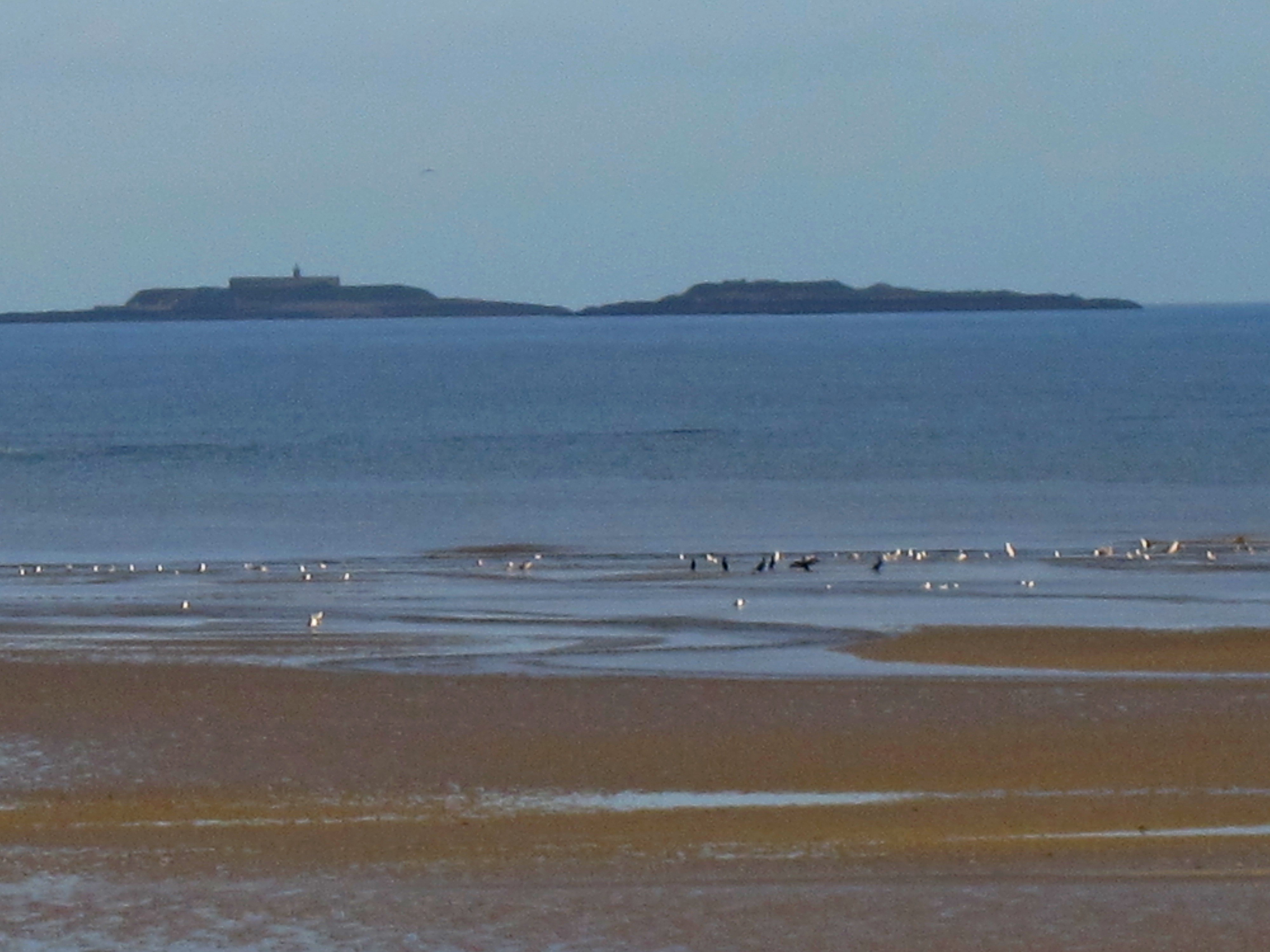
- Îles Saint-Marcouf from the beach at Ravenoville

- Location in Normandy Îles Saint-Marcouf (France)
- Coordinates: 49°29′45″N 1°09′00″W
- Country: France
- Region: Normandy

Îles Saint-Marcouf comprise two small uninhabited islands off the coast of Normandy, France. They lie in the Baie de la Seine region of the English Channel and are 6.5 km (4.0 mi) east of the coast of the Cotentin Peninsula at Ravenoville and 13 km (8 mi) from the island of Tatihou and the harbour at Saint-Vaast-la-Hougue. In addition to the fortifications described below, on the larger island there is a lighthouse that dates to 1948.

The larger island, île du Large, is 500 m (1,600 ft) east of the smaller île de Terre. They have a total area of 1,400 ha (3,500 acres) and a maximum altitude of 10 m (33 ft).

The islands take their name from Saint Marcouf, a saint born in Bayeux, whom it was said could cure anyone of scrofula. He died on the Îles Saint-Marcouf on 1 May 588 CE. There was a monastic presence on the islands until the 15th century.

== British occupation ==
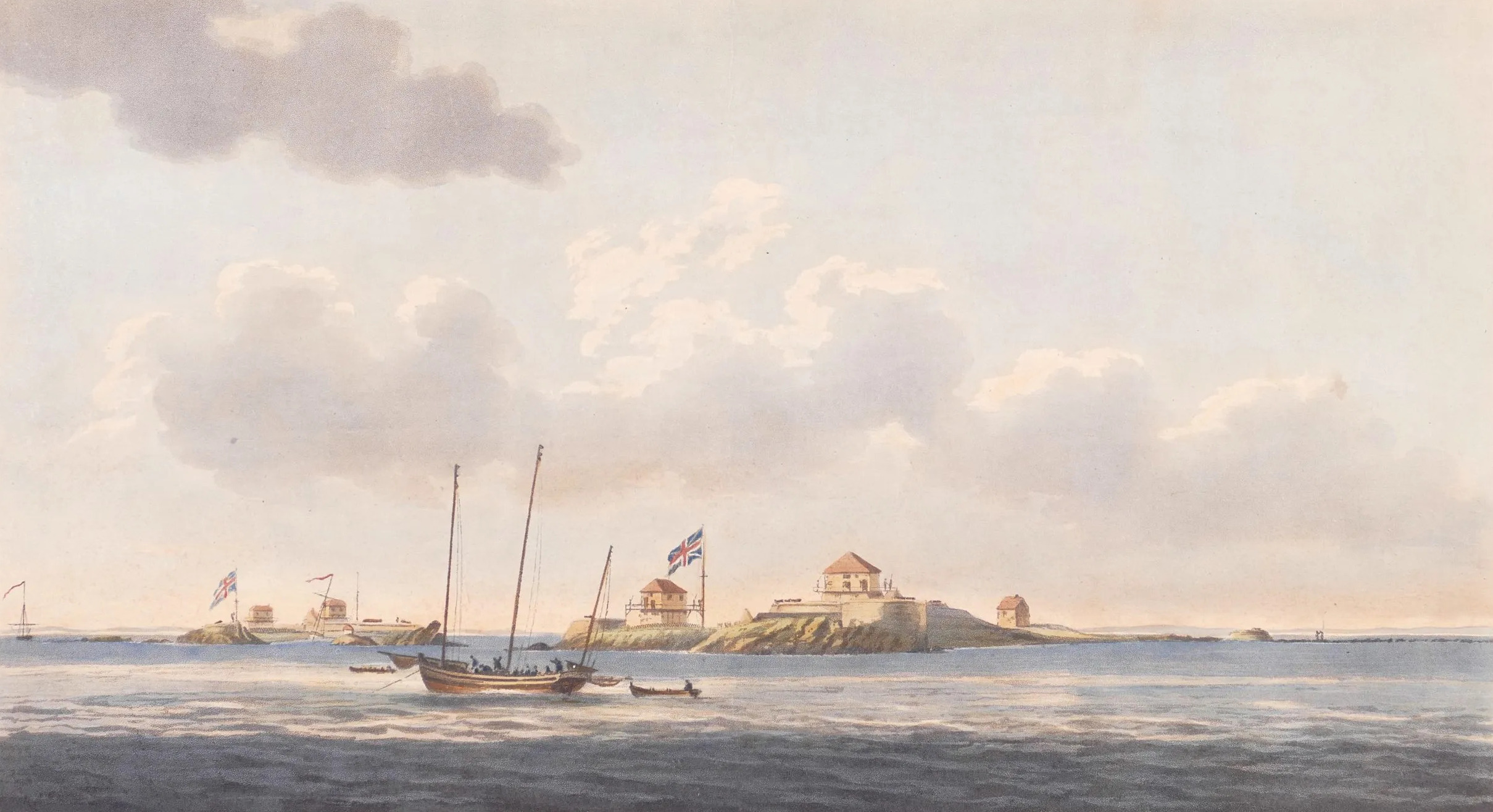
1798 illustration of the Îles Saint-Marcouf under British occupation

During the French Revolutionary Wars, Britain occupied the islands for nearly seven years as a strategic forward base. In July 1795, British sailors and marines from the Western Frigate Squadron under Captain Sidney Smith in HMS Diamond occupied the islands. Smith dedicated several gunboats, including Badger, Hawke, Shark and Sandfly, the last purpose-built for the role, to provide materials and manpower for fortifying the islands and establishing a garrison. Royal Engineers helped construct redoubts and shore batteries that detachments of marines and Royal Artillery troops, who augmented the sailors, helped man. In December 1795, the crew of Shark mutinied, in part because of the harsh conditions on the islands, and handed her over to the French.

The islands served as a forward base for the blockade of Le Havre, a launching point for intercepting coastal shipping, and as a transit point for French émigrés. The British repelled a major attack on 7 May 1798 by French troops at the Battle of the Îles Saint-Marcouf, with the defenders suffered 5 casualties and the attackers 1,700. The islands almost made naval history in late 1800. On 12 September, Robert Fulton sailed his submarine Nautilus to Growan, near Isigny-sur-Mer, a small harbour near the islands. His objective was to use his submarine to attack the gunvessels protecting the islands. He made two attempts, but each time his targets sailed before he could reach them. Increasingly poor weather as winter approached prevented any further attempts. Although Fulton continued work on his concept, he never again threatened the islands.

== French control ==
The British returned the islands to France under the terms of Article 3 of the 1802 Treaty of Amiens; the last British forces left the islands in May 1802. Napoleon ordered the islands fortified and the work began in 1803. The primary defences consisted of a fort on Île du Large, 170 meters in diameter. The main structure is a circular fort with a diameter of 53 meters, with 48 firing ports for cannon on two levels of 24 casemates each. This work was completed by 1812. There are seven underground chambers and a cistern. The fort could accommodate 500 troops.

In 1840, a lighthouse was constructed within the fort. German forces destroyed it during World War II.

Later construction, between 1860 and 1867, added a quay, a powder magazine, and a semaphore station, the whole encircled with moats carved into the rock. The total complex covers 2.5 hectares. The quay has since disappeared, reclaimed by the ocean. In 1871, 200 Communards from the Paris Commune were incarcerated here in deplorable conditions.

On Île de Terre, the fortifications date to between 1849 and 1858. They consist of a shore battery and a guard house capable of housing some 60 troops. Neither island was attacked again until the 20th century.

== World War II ==
In World War II, the islands became the first French territory that seaborne Allied forces took on D-Day. At 04:30 on 6 June 1944, four US soldiers, armed only with knives, swam ashore from two-man rubber boats. When they had verified that the islands were unoccupied, 132 troops from 4th and 24th Squadrons of the U.S. 4th Cavalry Group landed on the islands to secure the approaches to Utah Beach. Although they faced no resistance, the island was heavily mined, resulting in American casualties.

== Nature reserve ==
The French government directly administers the islands, which have the status of a protected nature reserve with restricted access. Île de Terre has been a designated nature preserve since 1967. Île du Large has been off-limits since 1991 for reasons of safety. The primary bird species are seagulls and cormorants. In winter, tens of thousands of seagulls shelter on the islands. Although access to the islands is forbidden, anchoring between them is permissible.

Currently, the fortifications are falling into ruins. Since 2003, the association "Les amis de l'île du large Saint-Marcouf" (Friends of Saint-Marcouf), together with students from the Collège de Carentan, have initiated a campaign to convince the authorities once again to permit recreational access to the Île du Large. In 2009, the Friends of Saint-Marcouf received permission to commence preservation work on the fortifications and they have been working there since then. (See: Website, in French, of "les Amis de l'île du Large Saint-Marcouf".)
