= Sidney Smith (Royal Navy officer) =

Royal Navy officer and politician (1764–1840)

Admiral Sir Sidney Smith GCB FRS
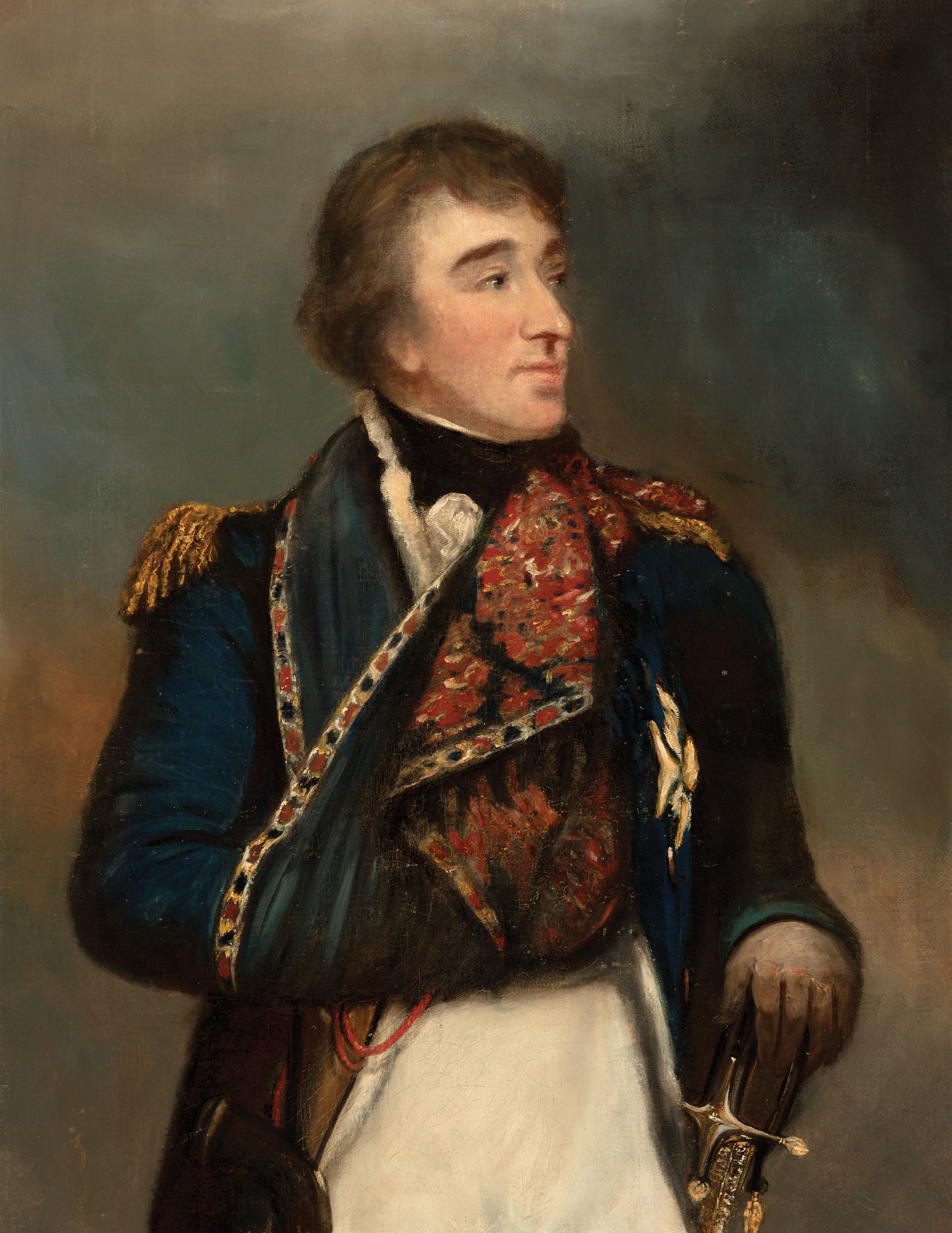
- Portrait by Robert Ker Porter, 1802
- Born: 21 June 1764; Westminster, London
- Died: 26 May 1840 (aged 75); Paris, France
- Military career
- Allegiance: Great Britain; Sweden; United Kingdom
- Branch: Royal Navy; Swedish Navy
- Service years: 1777–1815
- Rank: Admiral (Royal Navy)
- Conflicts: American War of Independence; Battle of Cape St. Vincent (1780); Battle of the Chesapeake; Battle of the Saintes; Russo-Swedish War (1788–1790); Battle of Vyborg Bay (1790); Battle of Svensksund (1790); French Revolutionary Wars; Siege of Toulon (1793); Capture of Îles Saint-Marcouf; Croisière du Grand Hiver; French invasion of Egypt and Syria; Siege of Acre (1799); Battle of Abukir (1799); Battle of Abukir (1801); Battle of Alexandria (1801); Siege of Cairo; Siege of Alexandria (1801); Napoleonic Wars; Channel Coast campaign; Battle of Ostend (1804); Raid on Boulogne; Invasion of Naples (1806); Battle of Maida; Dardanelles operation; Peninsular War; Hundred Days; Reduction of the French fortresses in 1815; Occupation of Paris
- Awards: Order of the Sword; Order of the Tower and Sword; Knight Commander of the Bath; Knight Grand Cross of the Most Honourable Order of the Bath

Admiral Sir William Sidney Smith (21 June 1764 – 26 May 1840) was a British naval officer and politician. Serving in the American War of Independence and French Revolutionary and Napoleonic Wars, he rose to the rank of admiral in the Royal Navy. Smith was known for his outspoken character and penchant for acting on his own initiative, which caused a great deal of friction with many of his superiors and colleagues.

Smith's military skill, personal intelligence and enterprise led to his involvement in a variety of tasks which involved warfare, diplomacy and espionage. He became a hero in Britain for leading the successful defence of Acre in 1799, thwarting Napoleon's plans of further conquest in Ottoman Syria. Napoleon, reminiscing later in his life, reportedly said of him: "That man made me miss my destiny".

== Early life and career ==
Sidney Smith, as he always called himself, was born into a military and naval family with connections to the Pitt family. He was born at Westminster, the second son of Captain John Smith of the Guards and his wife Mary Wilkinson, daughter of wealthy merchant Pinckney Wilkinson. Sidney Smith attended Tonbridge School until 1772. He joined the Royal Navy in 1777 and fought in the American War of Independence. From June 1777 to January 1778 he served under Commander Jahleel Brenton on board the storeship Tortoise. He moved to the post ship HMS Unicorn, and in her saw action in 1778 against the American frigate Raleigh.

For his bravery under Rodney in the action near Cape St Vincent in January 1780, Sidney Smith was, on 25 September, appointed lieutenant of the 74-gun third-rate Alcide, despite being under the required age of nineteen.

He distinguished himself under Admiral Thomas Graves at the Battle of the Chesapeake in 1781 and under Admiral George Rodney at the Battle of the Saintes. In consequence he received his first command, the sloop Fury. He was soon promoted to captain a larger frigate, but following the peace of Versailles in 1783, he was put ashore on half pay.

During the peace, Smith chose to travel to France and first became involved with intelligence matters while observing the construction of the new naval port at Cherbourg. He also travelled in Spain and Morocco which were also potential enemies.

== Service in the Swedish Navy ==
In 1790, he applied for permission to serve in the Swedish Navy in the war between Sweden and Russia. King Gustav III appointed him to command one light squadron and to be one of his principal naval advisers. Smith led his forces in the attempt of clearing the Bay of Viborg of the Russian fleet and later at the Battle of Svensksund (Finnish: Ruotsinsalmi, Russian: Rochensalm). The Russians lost sixty-four ships and over a thousand men. The Swedes lost four ships and had few casualties. For this, Smith was knighted by the king and made a Commander Grand Cross of the Order of the Sword. Smith used this title, with King George III's permission.

== Service in the French Revolutionary Wars ==
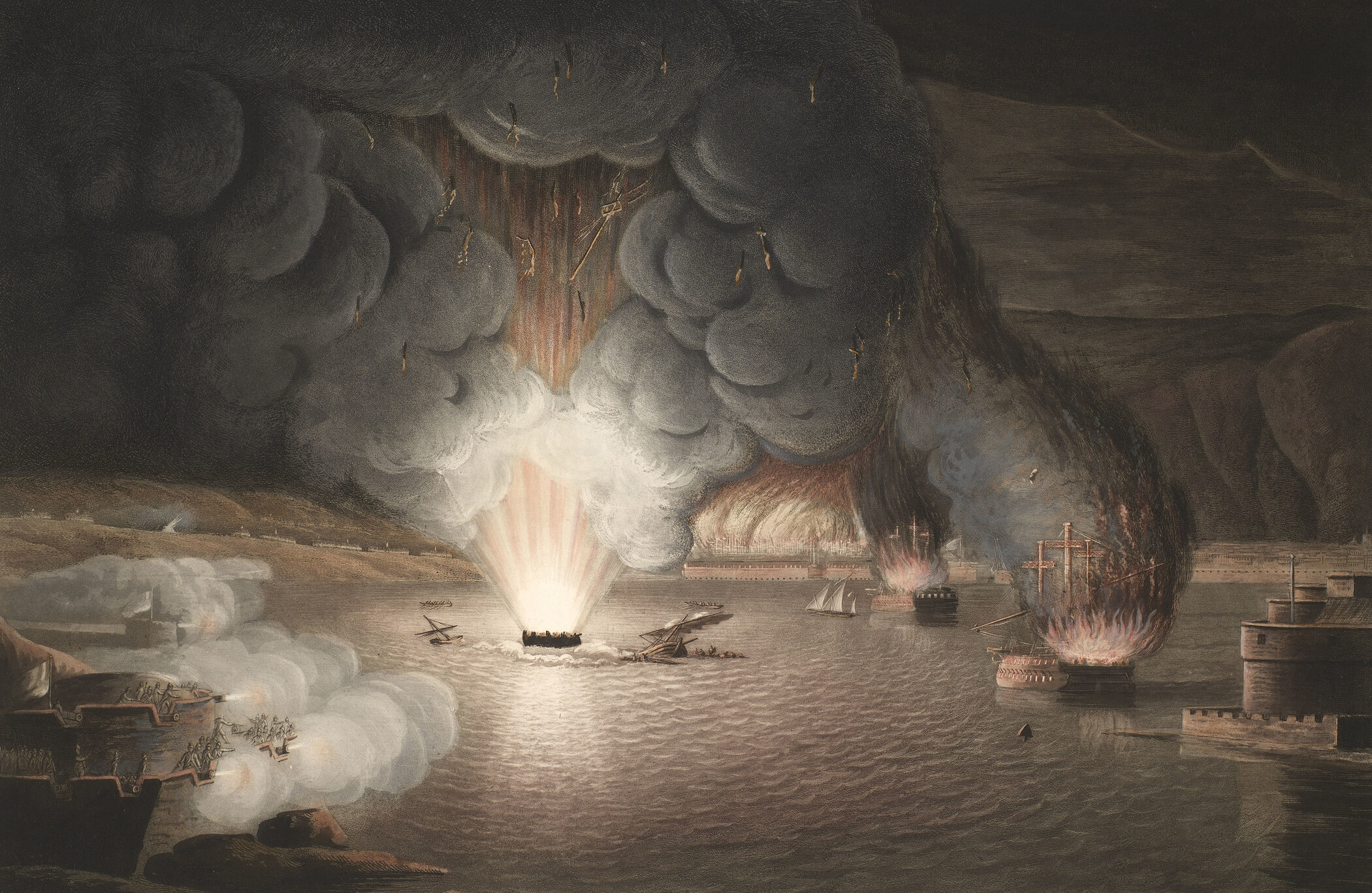
Smith participating in the destruction of the French fleet at Toulon in 1793

In 1792, Smith's younger brother, John, was appointed to the British embassy to the Ottoman court in Constantinople. Smith obtained permission to travel to the Ottoman Empire. While there, Revolutionary France declared war on Britain in February 1793. Smith recruited some British seamen and sailed to join the British fleet under Admiral Lord Hood which had occupied the French Navy's principal Mediterranean port of Toulon at the invitation of the French Royalist forces.

By Smith's arrival in December 1793, the Revolutionary forces, including a colonel of artillery, Napoleon Bonaparte, had surrounded the port and were attacking it. The British and their allies had insufficient soldiers to mount an effective defence and so the port was evacuated. Smith, serving as a volunteer with no command, was given the task of burning as many French ships and stores as possible before the harbour could be captured. Despite his efforts, lack of support from the Spanish forces sent to help him left more than half of the French ships to be captured undamaged. Although Smith had destroyed more French ships than had the most successful fleet action to that date, Nelson and Collingwood, among others, blamed him for this failure to destroy all of the French fleet.

On his return to London, Smith was given command of the fifth-rate HMS Diamond and in 1795 joined the Western Squadron under Sir John Borlase Warren. This squadron consisted of some of the most skilful and daring captains, including Sir Edward Pellew. Smith fitted this pattern and on one occasion took his ship almost into the port of Brest to observe the French fleet.

In July 1795, Captain Smith, commanding the western frigate squadron in HMS Diamond, occupied the Îles Saint-Marcouf off the coast of Normandy. He sacrificed two of his gun vessels, HMS Badger and HMS Sandfly, to provide materials and manpower for fortifying the islands and setting a temporary naval garrison. Further defences were constructed by Royal Engineers, and Royal Marines and Royal Artillery detachments were established. The islands served as a forward base for the blockade of Le Havre, a launching point for intercepting coastal shipping, and as a transit point for French émigrés, and were held by the Royal Navy for nearly seven years.

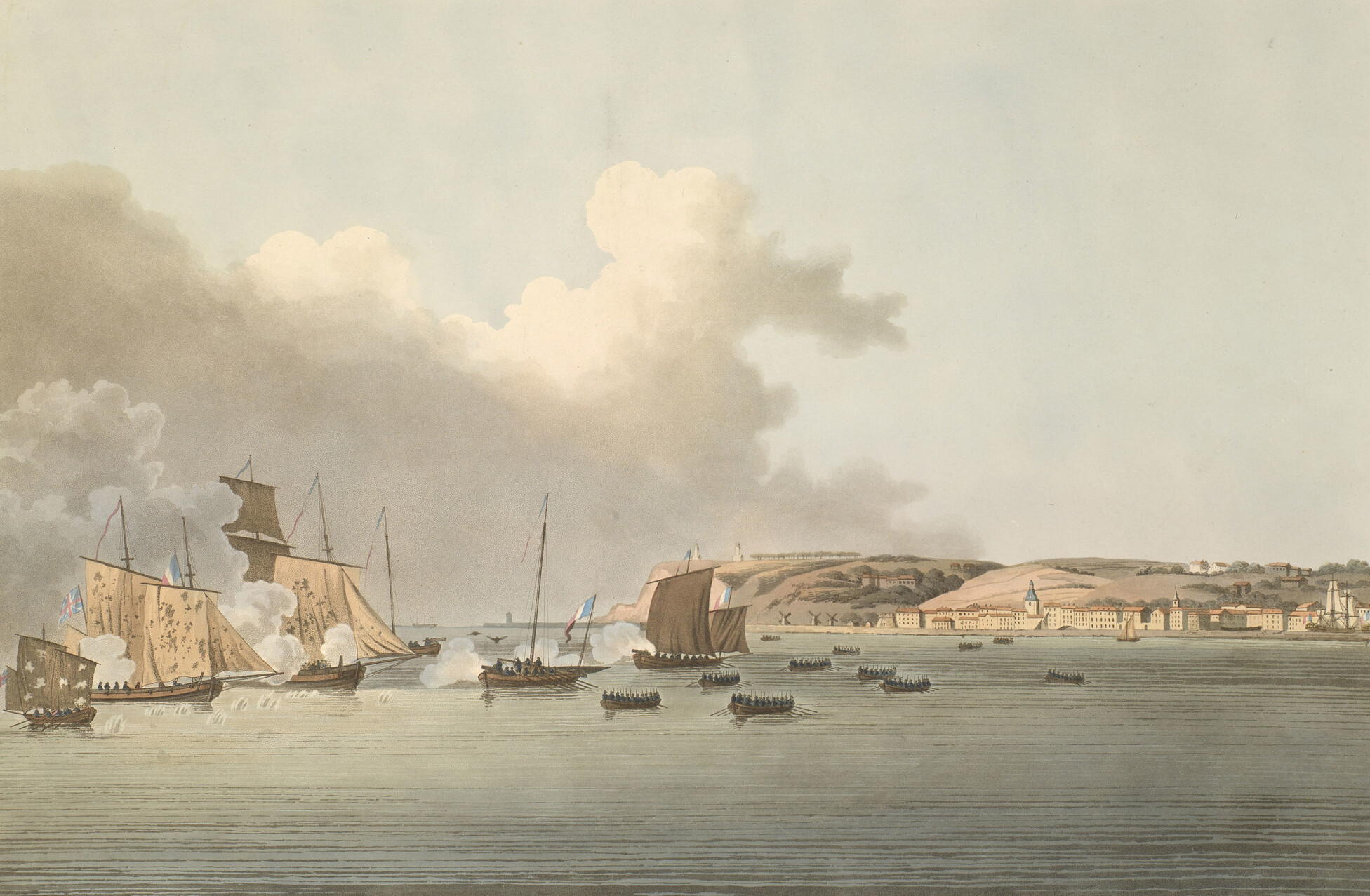
Smith being captured by the French off Le Havre on 18 April 1796

Smith specialised in inshore operations, and on 19 April 1796, he and his secretary John Wesley Wright were captured while attempting to cut out a French ship in Le Havre. Smith had taken the ship's boats into the harbour, but the wind died as they attempted to leave the harbour, and the French were able to recapture the ship with Smith and Wright aboard. Instead of being exchanged, as was the custom, Smith and Wright were taken to the Temple prison in Paris where Smith was to be charged with arson for his burning of the fleet at Toulon. As Smith had been on half pay at the time, the French considered that he was not an official combatant. Whilst in the Temple prison he commissioned a drawing of himself and his secretary John Wesley Wright from the French artist Philippe-Auguste Hennequin, which is now in the British Museum. Another drawing by Hennequin, depicting only Smith, is in the Metropolitan Museum of Art.

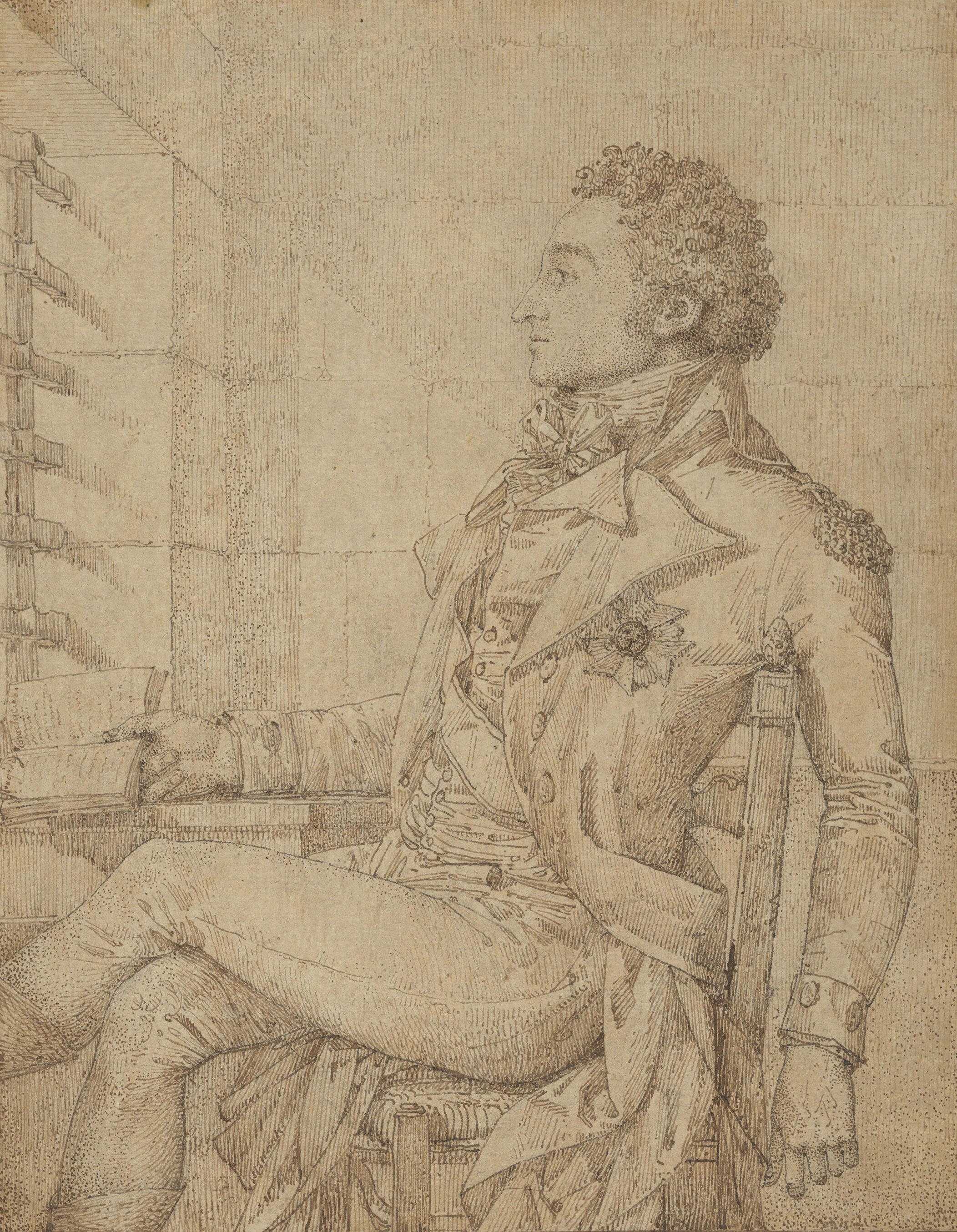
1796 portrait of Smith in the Temple Prison by Philippe-Auguste Hennequin

Smith was held in Paris for two years, despite a number of efforts to exchange him and frequent contacts with both French Royalists and British agents. Notably Captain Jacques Bergeret, captured in April 1796 with the frigate Virginie, was sent from England to Paris to negotiate his own exchange; when the Directoire refused, he returned to London. The French authorities threatened several times to try Smith for arson, but never followed through on the threats. Eventually in 1798 the Royalists, who pretended to be taking him to another prison, helped Smith and Wright to escape. The royalists brought the two Englishmen to Le Havre, where they boarded an open fishing boat and were picked up on 5 May by HMS Argo on patrol in the English Channel, arriving in London on 8 May 1798. Bergeret was then released, the British government considering the prisoner exchange as completed.

== Service in the Mediterranean ==
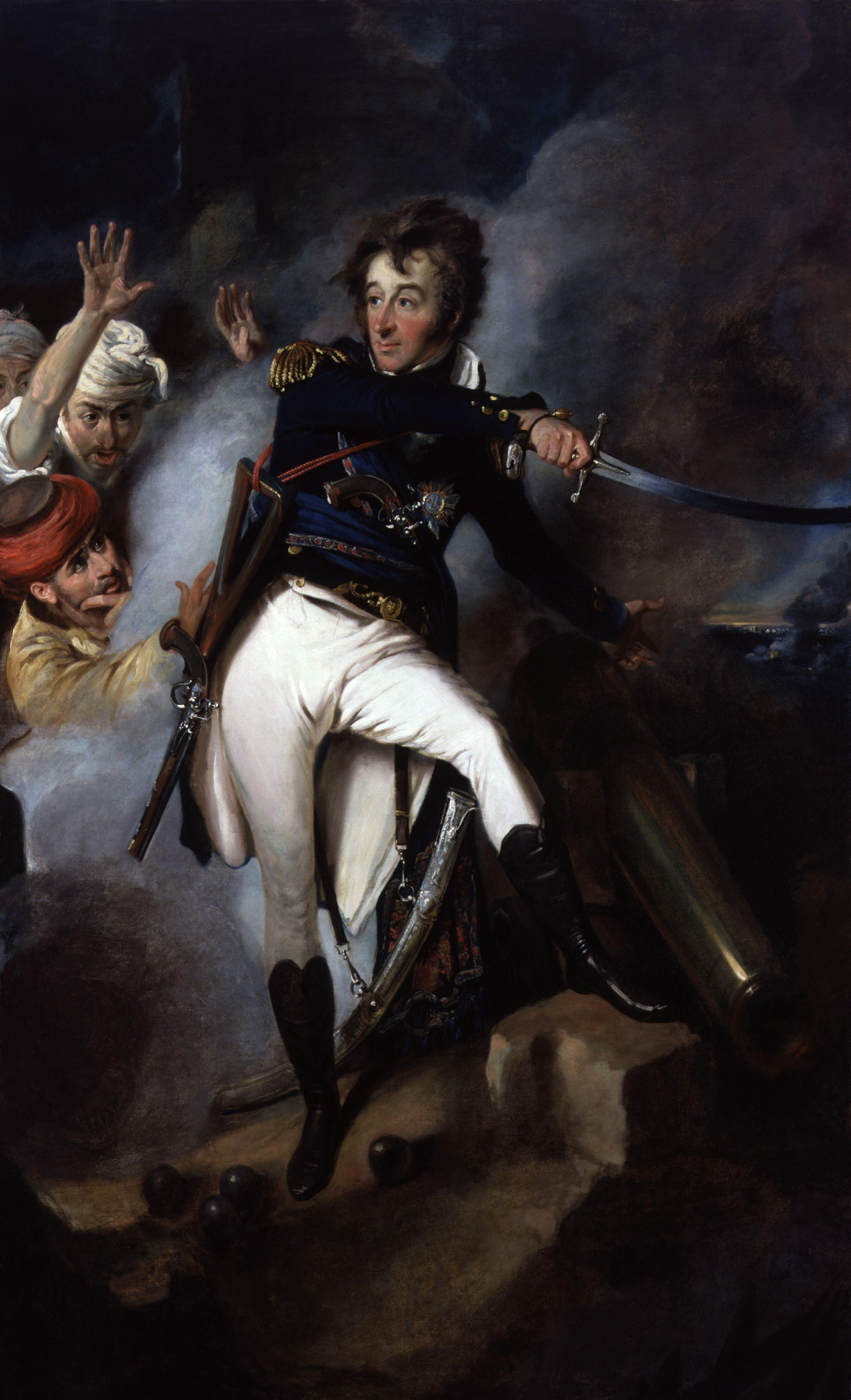
Commodore Smith at Acre. On his left breast one can see the star of the Order of the Sword.

Following Nelson's overwhelming victory at the Battle of the Nile, Smith was sent to the Mediterranean as captain of HMS Tigre, a captured 80-gun French ship of the line which had been bought into the Royal Navy. It was not a purely naval appointment, although he was ordered to place himself under the command of Lord St Vincent, the commander-in-chief of the Mediterranean. St Vincent gave him orders as Commodore with permission to take British ships under his command as required in the Levant. He also carried a military and diplomatic mission to Istanbul where his brother was now a Minister Plenipotentiary to the Sublime Porte. The mission's task was to strengthen Ottoman opposition to Napoleon and to assist the Ottomans in destroying the French army stranded in Egypt. This dual appointment caused Nelson, who was the senior officer under St Vincent in the Mediterranean, to resent Smith's apparent superseding of his authority in the Levant. Nelson's antipathy further adversely affected Smith's reputation in naval circles.

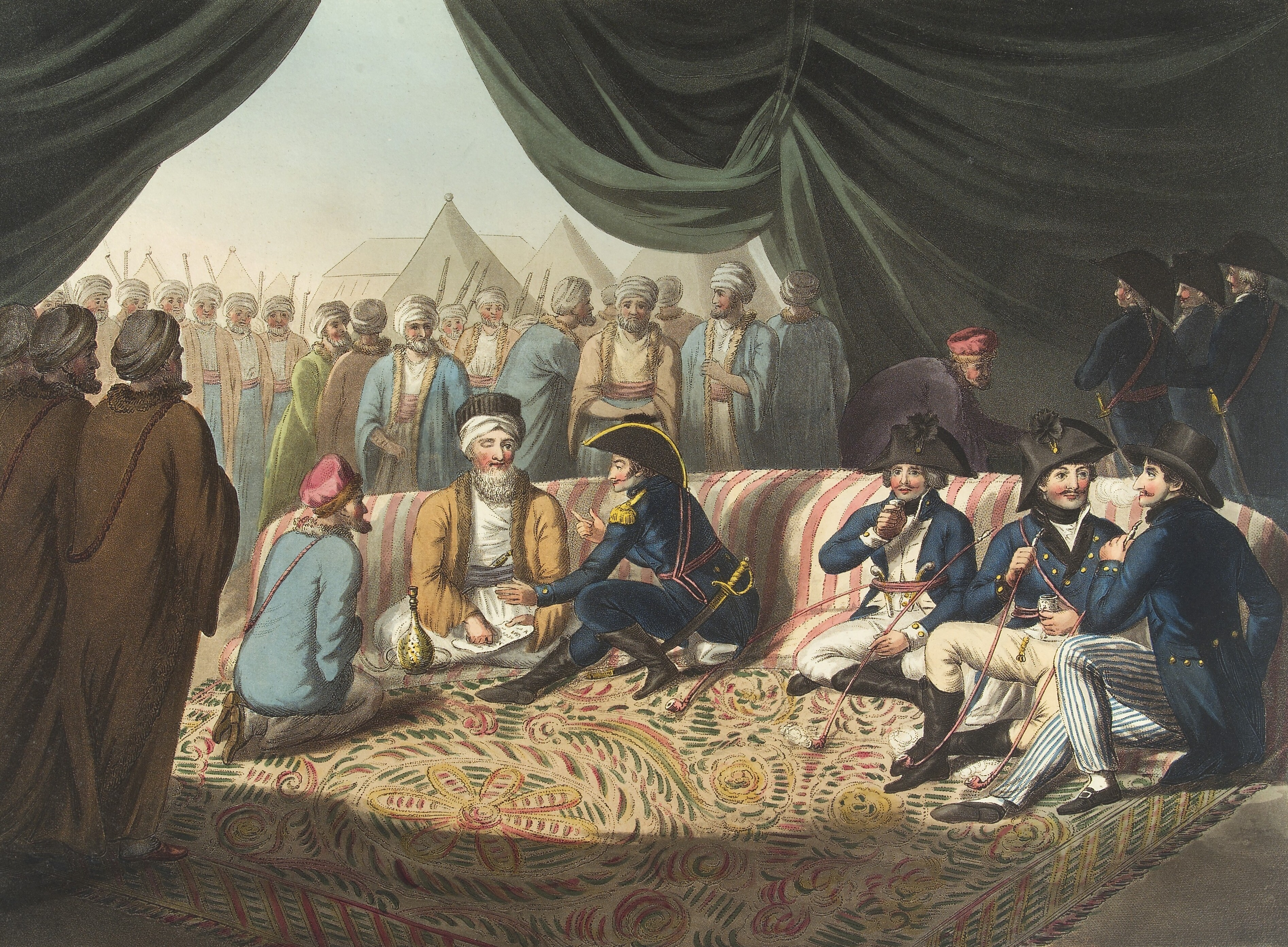
Smith negotiating with Kör Yusuf Ziyaüddin Pasha in the latter's tent, 22 June 1800

Napoleon, having defeated the Ottoman forces in Egypt, marched north along the Mediterranean coast with 13,000 troops through Sinai and into what was then the Ottoman province of Syria. Here he took control of much of the southern part of the province, representing modern-day Israel and Palestine, and of a single town in today's Lebanon, Tyre. On the way north he captured Gaza and Jaffa, the latter with much brutality towards the civilian population and the massacre of 3,000 captured Ottoman soldiers, whom he was unable to take with him or send back to Egypt. Napoleon's army then marched to Acre.

Smith sailed to Acre and helped the Ottoman commander Jezzar Pasha reinforce the defences and old walls and supplied him with additional cannon manned by sailors and marines from his ships. He also used his command of the sea to capture the French siege artillery being sent by ship from Egypt and to deny the French army the use of the coastal road from Jaffa by bombarding the troops from the sea.

Once the siege began in late March 1799, Smith anchored HMS Tigre and Theseus so their broadsides could assist the defence. Repeated French assaults were driven back, several attempts to mine the walls were prevented. By early May, replacement French siege artillery had arrived overland and a breach was forced in the defences. However, the assault was again repelled and Ottoman reinforcements from Rhodes were able to land. On 9 May after another fierce bombardment, the final French assault was made. This, too, was repelled and Napoleon began making plans for the withdrawal of his army to Egypt. Shortly after this, Napoleon abandoned his army in Egypt and sailed back to France evading the British ships patrolling the Mediterranean.

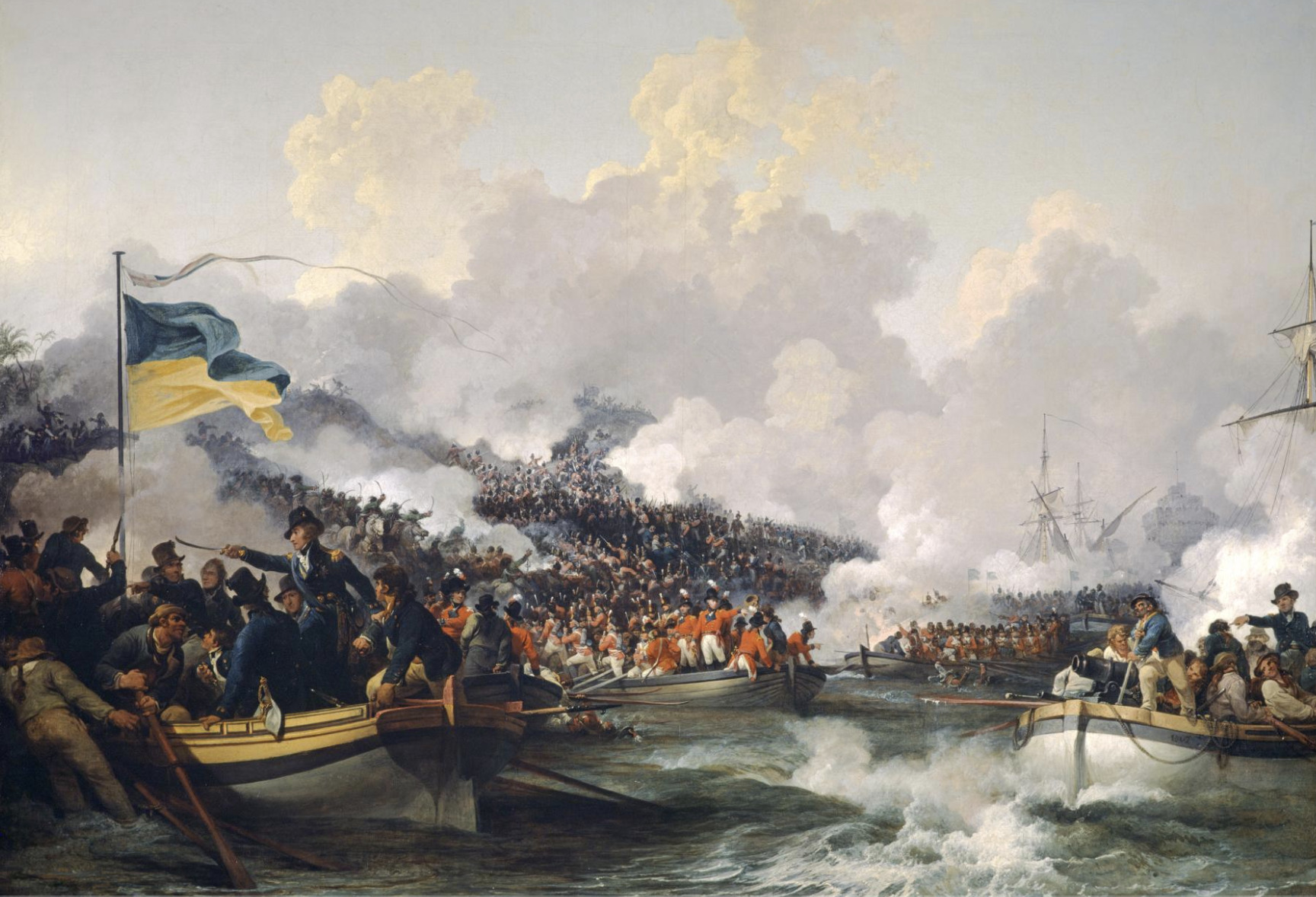
The Landing of British Troops at Aboukir by Philip James de Loutherbourg. The Landing of British troops at Aboukir under heavy fire. Smith is depicted standing on the foreground craft personally directing the landing.

Smith attempted to negotiate the surrender and repatriation of the remaining French forces under General Kléber and signed the Convention of El-Arish. However, because of the influence of Nelson's view that the French forces in Egypt should be annihilated rather than allowed to return to France, the treaty was abrogated by Lord Keith who had succeeded St Vincent as commander-in-chief.

In 1801, the British landed an army under Sir Ralph Abercromby at Abukir Bay. Smith and Tigre were involved in the training and transport of the landing forces and as liaison with the Ottomans, but his unpopularity resulted in the loss of his diplomatic credentials and his naval position as Commodore in the eastern Mediterranean. The invasion was successful and the French defeated, although Abercromby was wounded and died soon after the battle. Following this Smith then supported the army under Abercromby's successor John Hely-Hutchinson, which besieged and captured Cairo and finally took the last French stronghold of Alexandria. The French troops were eventually repatriated on terms similar to those previously obtained by Smith in the Convention of El-Arish.

== Service in British waters ==
Annuity to Sir Sidney Smith Act 1801
- Act of Parliament
- Parliament of the United Kingdom
- Long title: An Act to enable His Majesty to grant a certain Annuity to Captain Sir Sidney Smith, in consideration of the eminent Services which he has rendered during his Command on the Coast of Egypt.
- Citation: 41 Geo. 3. (U.K.) c. 5

Dates
- Royal assent: 24 March 1801
- Commencement: 21 May 1801 (Note: Section 1.)
- Expired: 26 May 1840
- Repealed: 10 August 1872
Other legislation
Repealed by	Statute Law Revision Act 1872

Status: Repealed

Text of statute as originally enacted

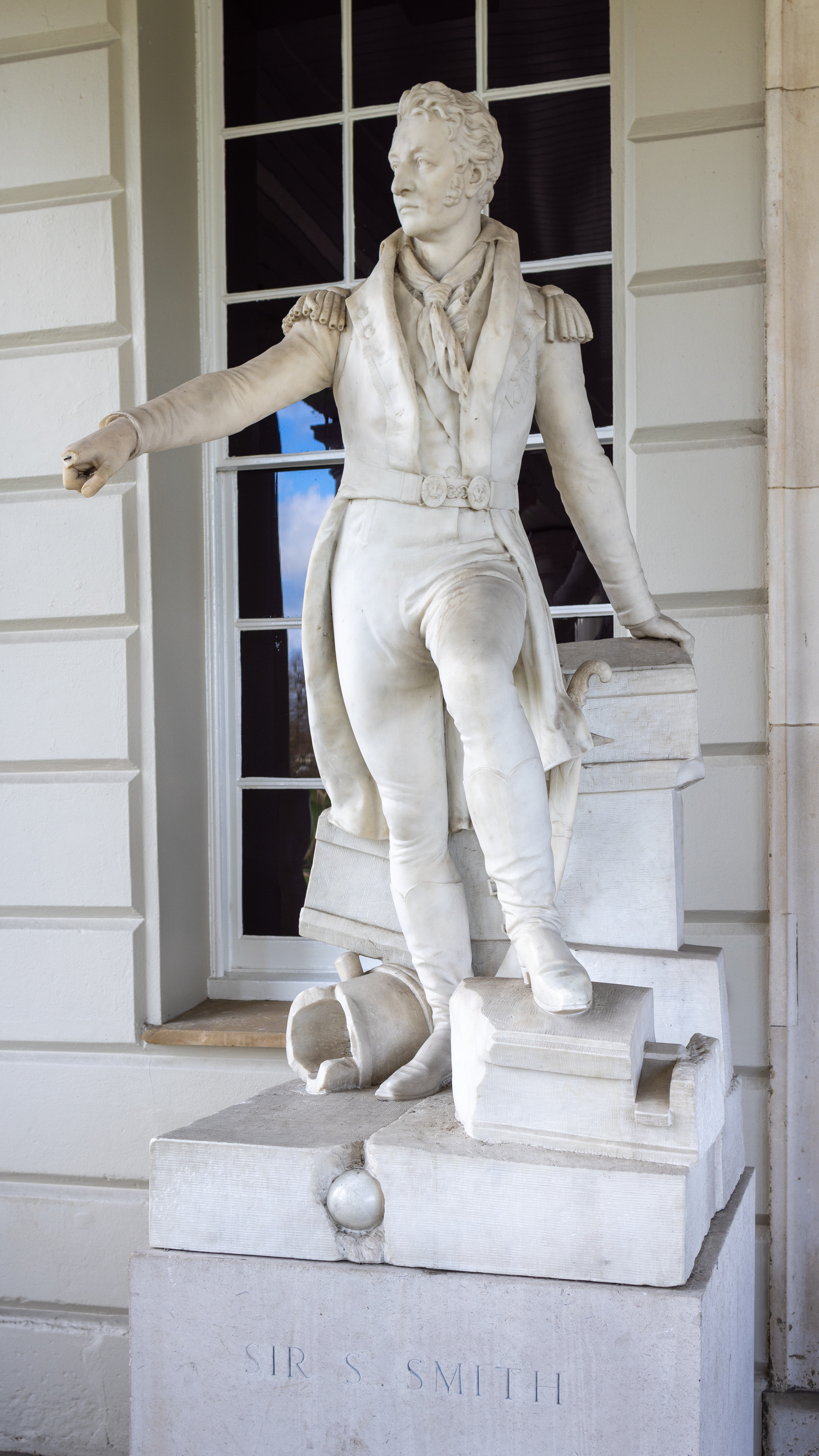
Statue commissioned as a national monument, pursuant to vote of the House of Commons in 1842, now at the National Maritime Museum

On his return to England in 1801, Smith received some honours and a pension of £1,000 for his services, but he was overshadowed again by Nelson who was being acclaimed as the victor of the Battle of Copenhagen. During the brief Peace of Amiens, Smith was elected member of parliament for Rochester in Kent in the election held in 1802. There is strong evidence that he had an affair with Princess Caroline of Brunswick, the estranged wife of the Prince of Wales. Although she became pregnant, she was notorious for having a number of other lovers at the same time, such as George Canning and Thomas Lawrence, so it is unlikely the child was Smith's.

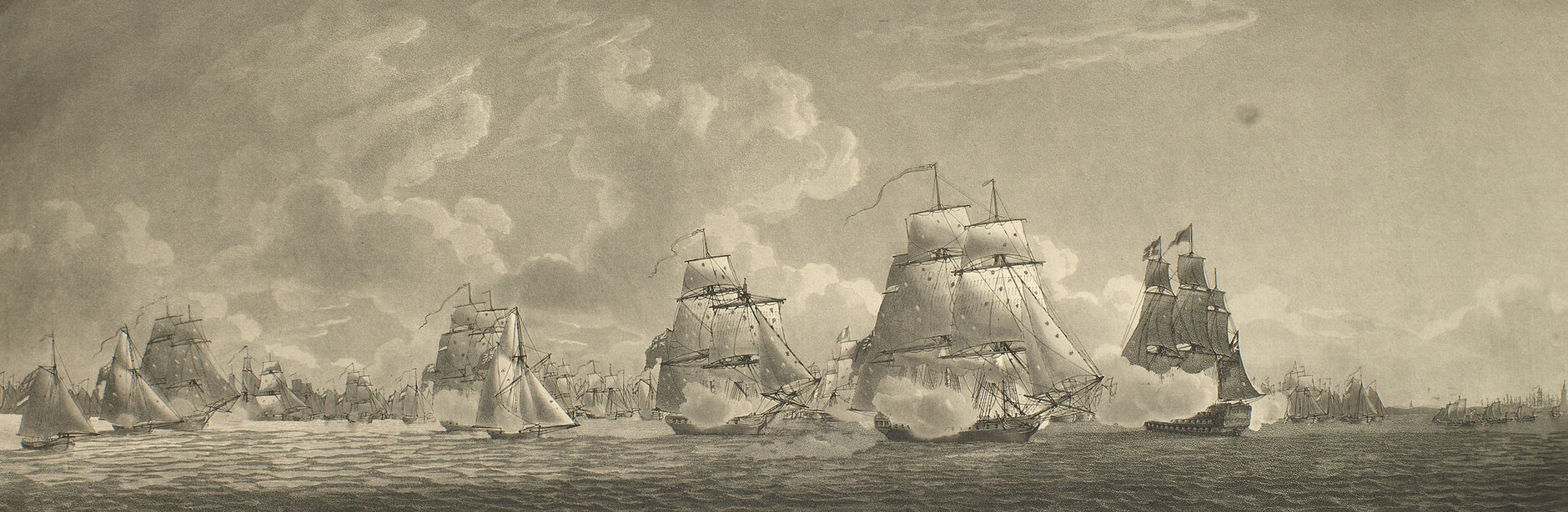
Smith's squadron engaging the Batavian Navy near Ostend, 16 May 1804

With the resumption of war with France in 1803, Smith was employed in the southern North Sea off the coast between Ostend and Flushing part of the forces gathered to prevent Napoleon's threatened invasion.

Smith was interested in new and unusual methods of warfare. In 1804 and 1805, he worked with the American inventor Robert Fulton on his plans to develop torpedoes and mines to destroy the French invasion fleet gathering off the French and Belgian coasts. However, an attempt to use the new weapons combined with Congreve rockets in an attack on Boulogne was foiled by bad weather and the French gunboats that came out to threaten the attackers. Despite this setback, suggestions were made that the rockets, mines and torpedoes be used against the Combined French and Spanish Fleet in Cádiz. This was not necessary as the combined fleet sailed to defeat at the Battle of Trafalgar in October 1805.

== Further service in the Mediterranean ==
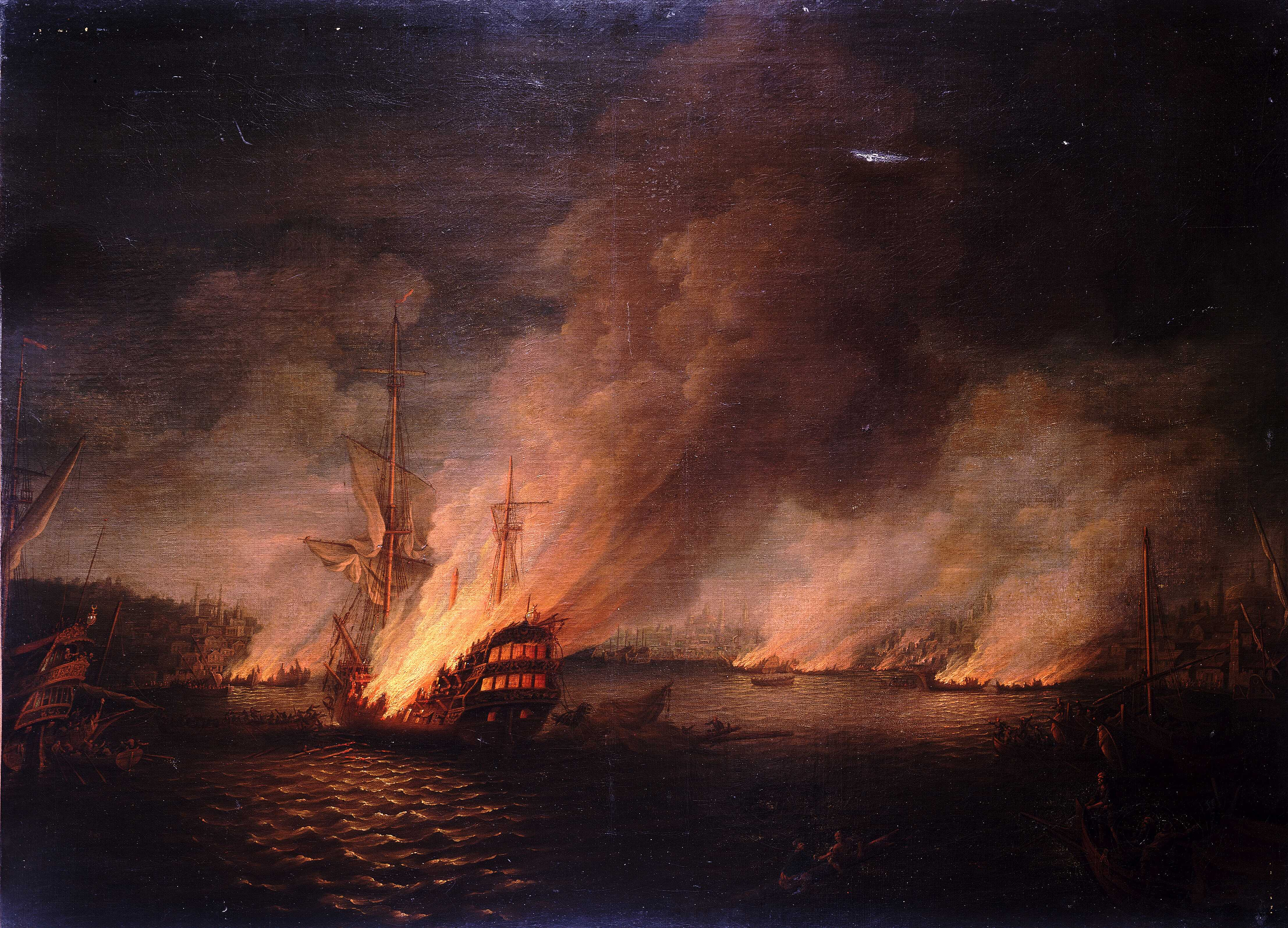
The destruction of an Ottoman squadron by Smith during the Dardanelles operation

In November 1805, Smith was promoted to rear admiral, he was again sent to the Mediterranean under the command of Collingwood, who had become the commander-in-chief following Nelson's death. Collingwood sent him to assist King Ferdinand I of the Two Sicilies to regain his capital of Naples from Napoleon's brother King Joseph, who had been given the Kingdom of Naples.

Smith planned a campaign using Calabrian irregular troops with a force of 5,000 British officers and men to march north on Naples. On 4 July 1806, they defeated a larger French force at the Battle of Maida. Once again, Smith's inability to avoid offending his superiors caused him to be replaced as commander of the land forces despite his success. He was replaced by Sir John Moore, one of Britain's most able soldiers. Moore abandoned Smith's plan and resorted to making the island of Sicily a strong British base in the Mediterranean.

Smith was sent to join Admiral Sir John Thomas Duckworth's expedition to Constantinople in February 1807. This was intended to forestall the French from making an alliance with the Ottomans to allow free passage of their army to Egypt. On 19 February Duckworth detached Smith's division to deal with an Ottoman Navy squadron impeding the fleet's progress, which Smith ably destroyed. Despite Smith's great experience in Ottoman waters, his knowledge of the Sublime Porte, and his personal popularity with the Ottomans, he was kept in a subordinate role during the campaign. Even when Duckworth eventually did ask for his advice, it was not heeded. Duckworth, instead of allowing Smith to negotiate with the Ottomans, which the French ambassador later said would have been the end of the French overtures, retreated back through the Dardanelles under heavy Ottoman fire. Although this was a defeat, the withdrawal under fire was played up as a heroic feat. In the summer of 1807, Duckworth and Smith were recalled to England.

== Portugal and Brazil ==
In October 1807, Spain and France signed a treaty to divide Portugal between them. In November 1807, Smith was appointed to command an expedition to Lisbon, either to assist the Portuguese in resisting the attack or to destroy the Portuguese fleet and blockade the harbour at Lisbon should that be unsuccessful. Smith arranged for the Portuguese fleet to sail for Rio de Janeiro, Brazil, at that time a Portuguese colony. He was involved in planning an attack on the Spanish colonies in South America, in combination with the Portuguese, contrary to his orders, but he was recalled to Britain in 1809 before any of the plans could be carried out. He received much popular acclaim for his actions and was treated as a hero, but the government continued to be suspicious of him, and he was not given any official honours. Smith was promoted to vice admiral on 31 July 1810. In the Royal Navy of the time, promotion from Post Captain to Admiral was automatic and based on seniority, not a specific reward for good service. Later that year in October 1810, he married Caroline Rumbold, the widow of a diplomat, Sir George Rumbold, with whom Smith had worked.

Upon safe arrival to Brazil escorting the Portuguese Royal Family, Admiral Smith was awarded by the Prince-Regent John, the Grand Cross of the newly restored Order of the Tower and Sword.

== Mediterranean again ==
In July 1812, Smith again sailed for the Mediterranean aboard his new flagship, the 74-gun HMS Tremendous. He was appointed as second in command to Vice-admiral Sir Edward Pellew. His task was to blockade Toulon and he transferred his flag to the larger Hibernia, a 110-gun first-rate. The French did not come out of port to confront the British. Early in 1814, the Allies entered Paris and Napoleon abdicated. With the coming of peace and the defeat of Napoleon, Smith began the journey back to England.

== Peace and Waterloo ==
In March 1815, Napoleon escaped from Elba and gathering his veteran troops marched on Paris where he was reinstated as Emperor of the French. Smith travelling back to England had only reached Brussels by June. Smith, his wife and stepdaughter attended the Duchess of Richmond's ball on night 15/16 June, and three days later, hearing the gunfire of a great battle, he rode out of Brussels and went to meet the Duke of Wellington. Smith found him late in the day when he had just won the Battle of Waterloo. Smith started making arrangements for the collecting and treatment of the many wounded soldiers on both sides. He was then asked to take the surrender of the French garrisons at Arras and Amiens and to ensure that the Allied armies could enter Paris without a fight and that it would be safe for King Louis XVIII to return to his capital. For these and other services, he was finally awarded a British knighthood, the KCB, so he was not just "the Swedish Knight" any more.

Smith then took up the anti-slavery cause. The Barbary pirates had operated for centuries out of a number of North African ports. They had enslaved captured sailors and even made raids to kidnap people from European coasts. Smith attended the Congress of Vienna to campaign for funds and military action to end the practice of slave taking.

== France and death ==
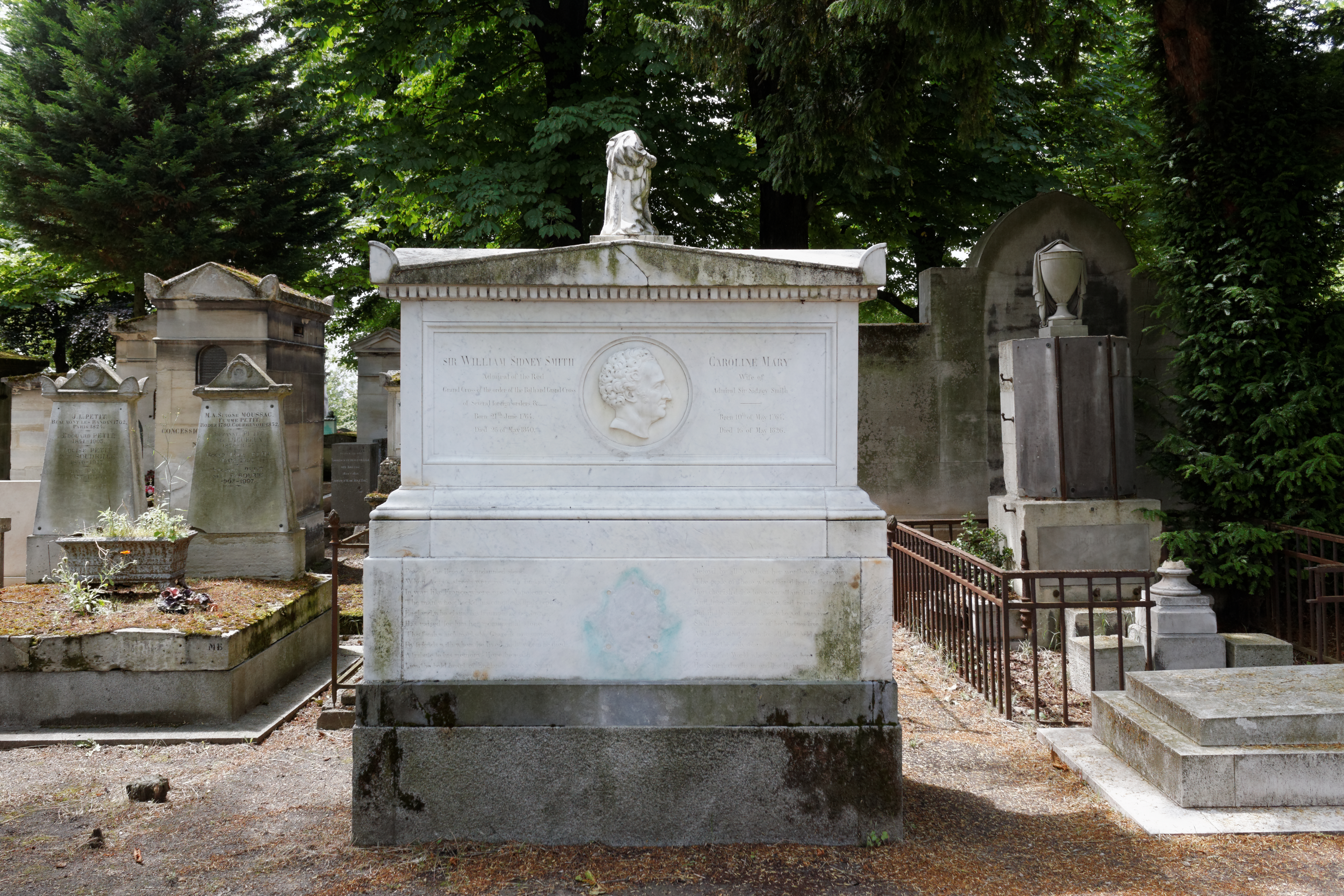
Grave of Sir Sidney Smith and his wife Caroline in the Père Lachaise cemetery, Paris

Smith had managed to run up significant debts through his diplomatic expenses, which the British government proved to be very slow in reimbursing. He also lived the high life and his efforts to mobilise opinion against the slave trade had cost a good deal of money. In Britain, at that time debtors were often imprisoned until their debts were paid, so Smith moved his family to France, settling in Paris. Eventually the government did reimburse his expenditures and increased his pension, allowing him to live in some style. Despite frequent attempts to obtain a seagoing position, he was never to hold a command again. He died on 26 May 1840 of a stroke. He is buried with his wife in Père Lachaise Cemetery.

== Namesakes ==
On 7 April 1801, the town Sidney in Delaware County, New York, was named in Sir Sidney Smith's honour. In June 1811 he was elected a Fellow of the Royal Society. In 1838 he was promoted to GCB in the Coronation Honours. Sidney Smith Barracks, in Mandate Palestine, were named in his honour. Now it is the site of Bustan Ha-Galil in northern Israel, where on 14 July 1941 the French forces in Syria and Lebanon signed their surrender to the British.

== See also ==
- O'Byrne, William Richard (1849). "Smith, William Sidney#cite note-Sidney Smith-1" . A Naval Biographical Dictionary . John Murray – via Wikisource.
- Barrow, John (1848): The life and correspondence of Admiral Sir William Sidney Smith, Volume 1
- Barrow, John (1848): The life and correspondence of Admiral Sir William Sidney Smith, Volume 2 (from 1800 onwards.)

== Bibliography ==
- Dowager Lady De Ros, Georgina (1889), "Personal Recollections of the Great Duke of Wellington", Murray's Magazine, Part I (January or February): 41.
- Ladimir, F.; Moreau, E. (1856), Campagnes, thriomphes, revers, désastres et guerres civiles des Français de 1792 à la paix de 1856, vol. 5, Librairie Populaire des Villes et des Campagnes, pp. 42–44
- Pocock, Thomas "Tom" (1998), A Thirst for Glory: The Life of Admiral Sir Sidney Smith, London: Pimlico, ISBN 0-7126-7341-5
- Shankland, Peter (1975), Beware of Heroes: Admiral Sir Sidney Smith's War Against Napoleon, London: William Kimber

== Arms ==
Coat of arms of Admiral Sir William Sidney Smith
Crest 1: A leopard's head Proper gorged with a plain collar, therefrom a line reflexed, iussuant out of an Eastern crown Or; 2, crest of augmentation: viz. An Imperial Ottoman chelingk Or plume of triumph from a turban. Escutcheon Azure, on a chevron engrailed between three lions passant guardant Or, a wreath of laurel Proper between two crosses calvary Sable on a chief of augmentation the interior of an ancient fortification in perspective, in the angle a breach, and on the sides of the said breach the standard of the Ottoman Empire and the Union flag of Great Britain. Supporters Dexter, a lamb murally crowned, in the mouth an olive branch, supporting the banner of Jerusalem; sinister, a tiger guard, navally crowned, in the mouth a palm branch, supporting the Union flag of Great Britain, with the inscription, 'Jerusalem, 1799' upon the cross of St. George. Motto Coeur de lion

Parliament of the United Kingdom
Preceded by Henry Tufton; Sir Richard King	Member of Parliament for Rochester; 1802–1806; With: James Hulkes	Succeeded by John Calcraft; James Barnett
Military offices
New creation	Commander-in-Chief; South America Station; 25 January 1808 – 18 May 1809	Succeeded by Michael de Courcy
