= British Rail Class 42 =

Diesel-hydraulic railway locomotive used in Great Britain

D800 Warship British Rail Class 42 Warship
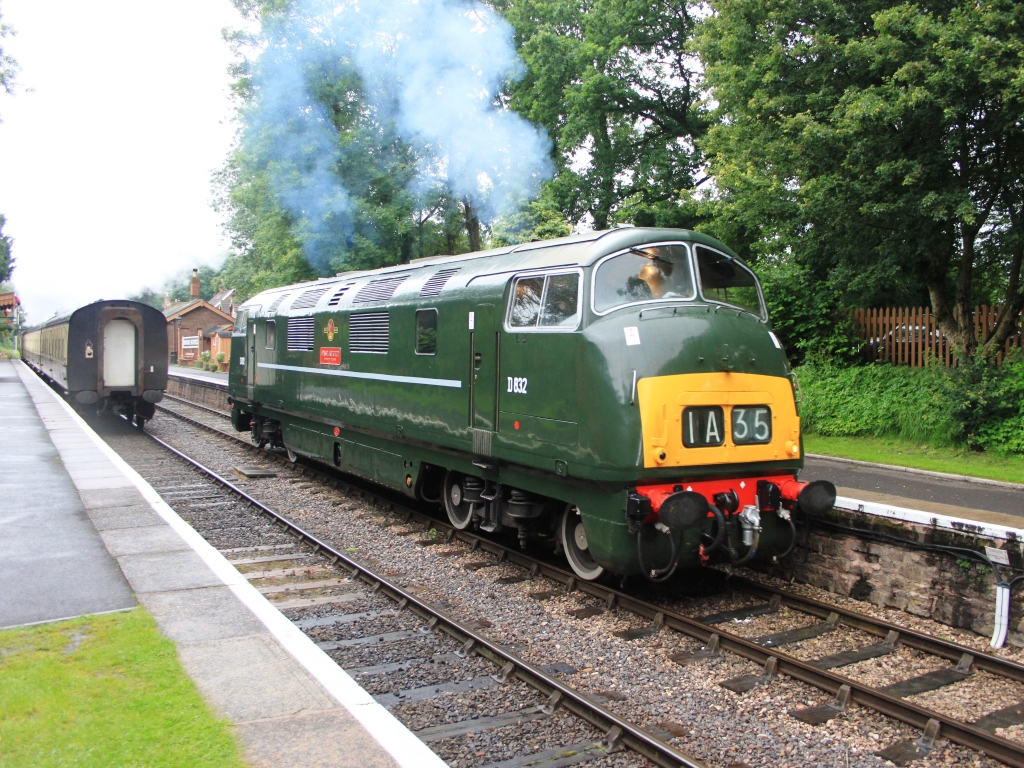
- D832 Onslaught at Crowcombe Heathfield on the West Somerset Railway in 2012
Type and origin
- Power type: Diesel-hydraulic
- Builder: British Railways' Swindon Works
- Build date: 1958–1961
- Total produced: 38
Specifications
- Configuration
  - UIC: B'B'
  - Commonwealth: B–B
- Gauge: 4 ft 8 1/2 in (1,435 mm) standard gauge
- Wheel diameter: 3 ft 3 1/2 in (1.003 m)
- Minimum curve: 4.5 chains (91 m)
- Wheelbase: 48 ft 3 in (14.71 m)
- Length: 60 ft 0 in (18.29 m)
- Width: 8 ft 10 in (2.69 m)
- Height: 12 ft 0 1/2 in (3.670 m)
- Loco weight: 78 long tons (79.3 t; 87.4 short tons)
- Fuel capacity: 800 imp gal (3,600 L; 960 US gal)
- Prime mover: D830: 2× Paxman Ventura YJXL; All others: 2× Bristol Siddeley Maybach MD650
- Engine type: Diesel engine
- Displacement: 64.5 L (3,940 cu in)
- Transmission: Mekydro Hydraulic
- MU working: ◆ White Diamond
- Train heating: Steam
- Train brakes: Vacuum
Performance figures
- Maximum speed: 90 mph (145 km/h)
- Power output: Engines: 1,135 hp (846 kW) at 1,530 rpm x 2 (D803-29, D831-32 & D866-70); 1,035 hp (772 kW) at 1,400 rpm × 2 (D800 to 802); 1,200 hp (890 kW) at 1,500 rpm x 2 (D830)
- Tractive effort: Maximum: 48,200 lbf (214 kN)
Career
- Operators: British Rail
- Numbers: D800–D832, D866–D870
- Nicknames: Warships
- Axle load class: Route availability 7 (RA 6 from 1969)
- Retired: 1968–1972
- Preserved: 821 Greyhound; 832 Onslaught
- Scrapped: 1968–1972, 1985 (818 Glory)
- Current owner: Diesel Traction Group (821); Bury Hydraulic Group (832)
- Disposition: Two preserved, remainder scrapped

The British Rail Class 42 Warship, originally known as the D800 Warship, is a class of diesel-hydraulic locomotives introduced in 1958. It was apparent at that time that the largest centre of expertise on diesel-hydraulic locomotives was in West Germany. The Western Region of British Railways negotiated a licence with German manufacturers to scale down the German Federal Railway's "V200" design to suit the smaller loading gauge of the British network, and to allow British manufacturers to construct the new locomotives. The resultant design was both cosmetically and functionally similar to the original V200 design.

Warship locomotives were divided into two batches: those built at Swindon Works were numbered in the series D800-D832 and D866-D870, had a maximum tractive effort of 52,400 pounds-force (233,000 N) and eventually became the Class 42. 33 others, D833–D865, were constructed by the North British Locomotive Company and became British Rail Class 43. They were allocated to Bristol Bath Road, Plymouth Laira, Newton Abbot and Old Oak Common.

== Overview ==
The Western Region of British Railways had decided upon hydraulic transmission with lightweight alloy construction for its new diesel locomotives to replace 'King' and 'Castle' class steam locomotives. This was partly because of the stiff gradients between Exeter and Plymouth on the Exeter to Plymouth line: to save fuel compared with hauling the additional weight of the locomotive up these gradients and allow an extra revenue-earning passenger coach to be added to the train.

== Mechanical details ==
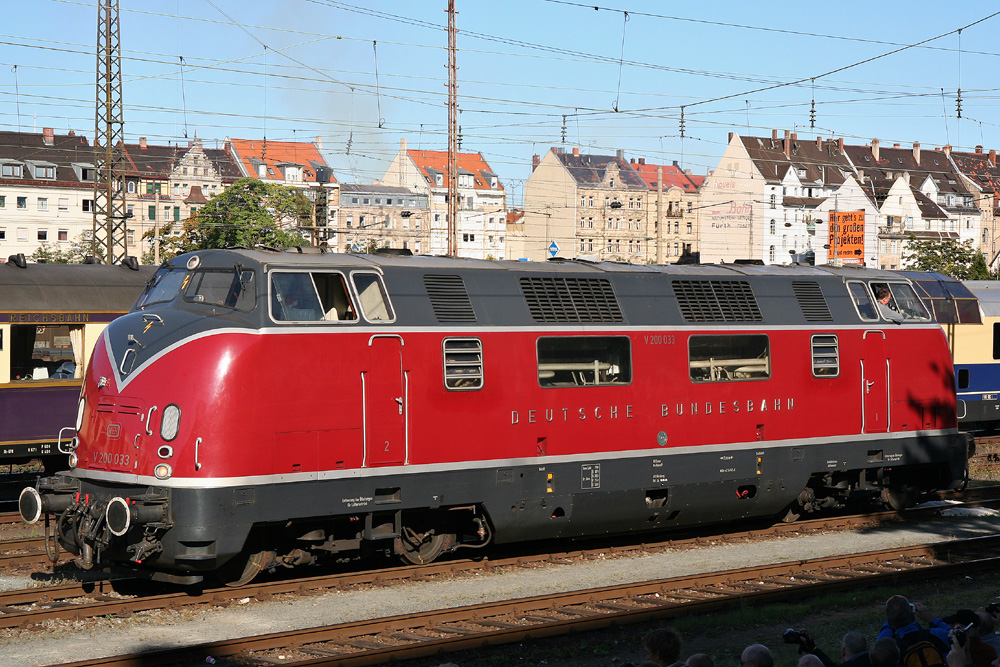
Deutsche Bundesbahn V 200 class of 1953, on which the "Warship" was based

Each locomotive was powered by two Maybach 1,035 hp (D800–802) or 1,135 hp (D803–829, D831–832 and D866–870) MD650 engines coupled to Mekydro hydraulic transmissions. These diesel engines were of German Maybach design, however they were manufactured by Bristol Siddeley at their factory at Ansty, near Coventry, under licence. The lower engine rating in the first three was because the first batch of transmissions could not accept more than this; a shortcoming swiftly rectified, although the technology of the time limited hydraulic transmissions to below 2,000 hp (1,500 kW) input, hence the need for two engines. D830 Majestic was equipped with two Paxman YJXL Ventura engines rated at 1,200 hp (890 kW), each as a potential showcase of an alternative British-designed engine which might prove superior to the German Maybach.

The new locomotives were substantially lighter than previous diesel-electric designs: a Class 44 Peak locomotive weighed 138 long tons (140 t; 155 short tons) and required 8 axles to carry it; the D800s weighed less than 80 tons and only needed 4 axles. D800–802 were produced as a pilot order and differed slightly both mechanically and cosmetically from the others. Aside from the obvious differences of disc versus rollerblind headcodes and the slightly less powerful engines, D800–802 were only equipped with six power controller notches, which was found to be unsatisfactory for smooth acceleration and economical running in operational use. These differences meant D800–802 were effectively a separate sub-class and could not work in multiple with the others (although the "white diamond" code multiple working capability of the Warships was rarely used until the late 1960s, and was removed from many locomotives as a constant source of electrical problems).

In 1960, British Railways introduced the Class 43 diesel hydraulic locomotives, with a maximum tractive effort of 53,400 pounds-force (238,000 N). These were constructed by North British Locomotives, numbered in the range D833 to D865 and also bore names. Although of a very similar design to the Swindon-built examples, the 43s were equipped with MAN engines and Voith hydraulic transmissions at a similar power rating as the Swindon locomotives. The Maybach engines were a more sophisticated design, with advanced features such as oil-cooled pistons that the MAN design lacked. The German V200 class, upon which the D800 design was based, used Mercedes and Maybach engines – the MAN engines were not fitted in significant numbers to V200 locomotives – coupled to Mekydro and Voith transmissions in roughly equal proportions, with engines and transmissions being completely interchangeable. Thus one locomotive might have one Mercedes engine coupled to a Mekydro transmission and a Maybach coupled to a Voith. This interchangeability of engines and transmissions was theoretically a feature of the BR design as well, but was never exploited. Detail differences in the floor construction after the first few Swindon production locomotives removed the ability to exchange transmissions.

== Names and liveries ==
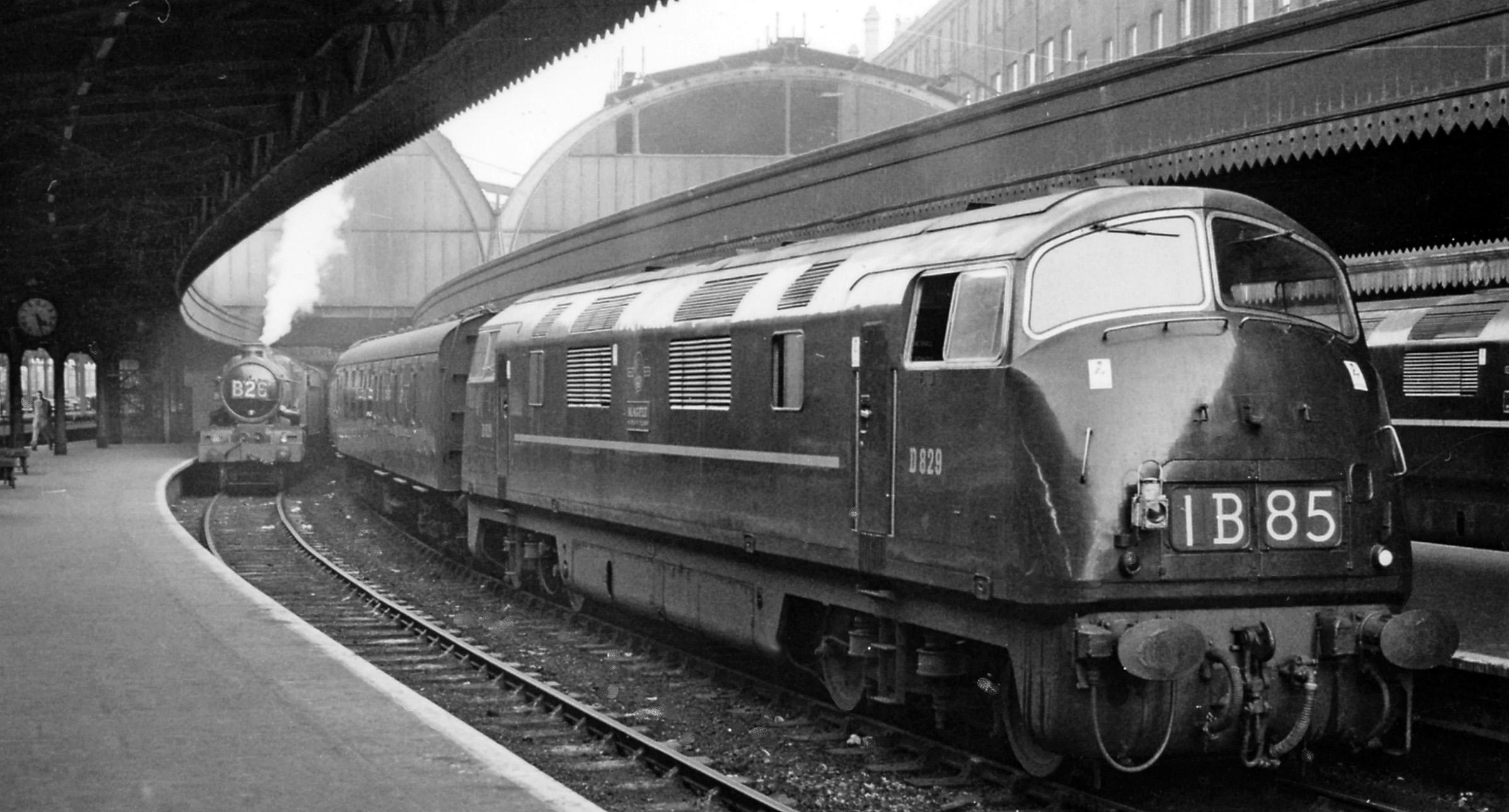
D829 'Magpie' waits at Paddington in 1961

Each locomotive bore a name: D825 for example was Intrepid. All except D800 and D812 were named after Royal Navy vessels, thus the "Warship diesel" moniker used to refer to the class. D800 was named Sir Brian Robertson after the Chairman of the British Transport Commission at the time. D812 was planned to carry the name Despatch but was eventually named Royal Naval Reserve 1859–1959. All except these two bore a subtitle "Warship Class" in smaller letters underneath the main name. A notable feature was that throughout the production series examples (including the NBL-built D833–865) the names were allocated alphabetically. This caused some difficulty when Swindon was unexpectedly given an order for five more locomotives (which became D866–870); a shortage of Warship names beginning with Z required some names for the higher numbered NBL examples to be reallocated.

The original livery for all D800s was BR green with a light grey waistband and red bufferbeams. In the mid-1960s, the WR decided upon maroon as its new house colour for mainline diesel locomotives, this going very much against standard schemes imposed by BR's overall management. In November 1966, the first D800 (D864) appeared in the new BR blue scheme with D864 carrying an experimental 'Burnt Umber' paint scheme around the lower skirting (an attempt to mask out brake dust). Half yellow nose ends appeared from January 1962 and eventually two Green, several Maroon and all Blue-liveried locomotives received full yellow ends. Green livery was eradicated by 1970 when D810 was repainted, this being the last green member of the class in service, although D800 had still carried the green livery when withdrawn in 1968. A handful of Maroon examples, including D809, D815 & D817 remained in traffic until 5 October 1971, and were finally withdrawn in this colour scheme, although by now wearing full yellow ends. Three of the early withdrawals, D801, D840 and D848, met their end in maroon with small yellow panels. After withdrawal of steam in 1968, the "D" prefix was dropped from locomotive running numbers when repaints occurred – so for example, D832 became just 832 as there was now no chance of it conflicting with a steam locomotive number.

== Service ==
Distribution of locomotives, July 1967
British Rail Class 42 is located in Devon
Code	Name	Quantity
83A	Newton Abbot	21
84A	Laira	17
Total:		38

The D800s were originally intended for the Paddington–Birmingham Snow Hill route and tests proved that their lighter weight and higher power allowed them to run to a two-hour schedule with 368 tons in tow: one coach more than a Class 40 could manage. These plans were put back when Paddington became the temporary London terminus of choice for Birmingham during the early 1960s, whilst BR's preferred route from Euston via Rugby was electrified. Loads of greater than 370 tons would be required and the service remained steam-hauled until the advent of the more powerful Class 52 Western diesel-hydraulic locomotives. The first service route for the class therefore became Paddington–Penzance, either via Swindon and Bristol, or via Newbury and Westbury on the "Berks and Hants" route. This allowed for elimination of steam on the difficult-to-operate railway west of Newton Abbot. In October 1958 D800 became the first locomotive to take up the class's new diagram of the up Cornish Riviera Express (Penzance to Paddington), the 18:30 Paddington–Bristol and the 21:05 Bristol–Plymouth – the last part of the diagram allowing the locomotive to return to the brand new depot at Laira in Plymouth once this was fully operational in 1961.

The maximum speed of the D800 class was officially 90 mph (140 km/h) but this could not be rigidly enforced because the transmissions could not be precisely governed. 102 mph (164 km/h) was recorded by D801 in private tests during 1959, albeit on a downgrade. The summer of 1959 saw 100 mph (160 km/h) service trains diagrammed for D800s with the Paddington–Bristol "Bristolian" set a schedule of 100 minutes. The outward journey via Bath required an average speed of 71 mph (114 km/h) and the return journey via Badminton averaged at 70.6 mph (113.6 km/h). For a very brief period the D800s achieved both the schedule and more with D804 exceeding 100 mph (160 km/h) three times on one early run from Bristol. This was soon ended when the Western Region's civil engineers imposed a blanket 90 mph (140 km/h) maximum speed on all the Region's main lines, where for five years there had, uniquely to BR at the time, been no restrictions at all. The root cause of this worry was the effect of small-diameter powered wheels carrying far more weight per inch of tread than those of a steam locomotive. These concerns arose particularly from experiences in the United States of America although the significant rail damage reported there was mostly caused by wheel sliding under braking with heavy trailing loads which were very unlikely to occur on BR. With the benefit of modern hindsight, it is possible to say that even though the full US experience would not be replicated, "gauge corner cracking" (the formation of microscopic cracks in the rails that was the primary cause of the Hatfield rail crash of 17 October 2000 in the UK) could have been a possibility if the schedules had been adhered to.

Around this time, several D800 drivers began reporting uncomfortable lurching over points or on poorly maintained track at high speeds. The problem was eventually traced to the novel design of the bogies and their means of attachment to the locomotive bodyshell: it had given the German V200s no trouble because of the 140 km/h (87 mph) speed limit on the German Federal Railway at the time. High speed running magnified the effect of the almost rigid link between body and bogie, and oscillations created in the entire locomotive structure when the wheels hit pointwork or indifferent track made derailment a very real risk as the tyres on the wheels wore down. The D800s were subject to a maximum speed of 80 mph (130 km/h) and although D804 received modified bogies that allowed the top speed to be restored to 90 mph (140 km/h) in 1961, it took until 1963 before the modification was fully tested and all members of the class were modified. The "Bristolian" was decelerated by 5 minutes but an extra stop at Chippenham was inserted so that the drivers practically had no choice but to exceed 80 mph (130 km/h) to keep to time. All speed running ceased after autumn 1960, when BR's timetabling methodology as a whole changed towards making all inter-city services more regular interval with standardised train formations and more intermediate stops. No longer would crack expresses such as the "Bristolian" be given such priority: the hope (largely successful) was to increase locomotive and coaching stock productivity and also increase passenger numbers in an attempt to curb BR's still-increasing monetary losses.

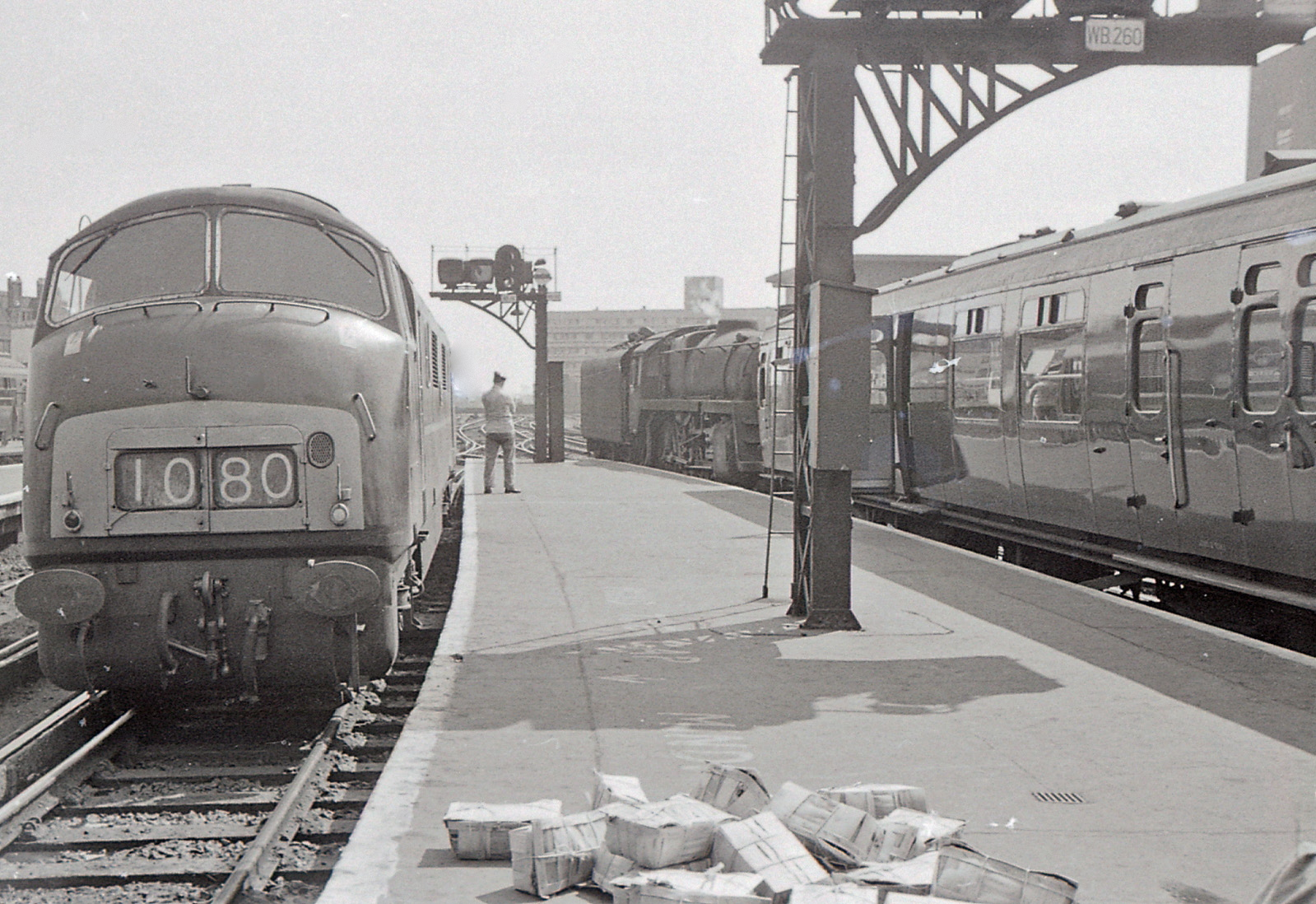
A "Warship" and a BR Class 5 4-6-0 at London Waterloo, 1967

By 1964, the influx of both more powerful Class 52 Western diesel-hydraulics and Class 47 diesel-electrics drafted into the WR by BR's higher management meant that some D800s were spared for use on the Waterloo–Exeter route. At this time, the Western Region (formed upon Nationalisation in 1948 largely from the Great Western Railway) had just assumed control of this line west of Salisbury from the Southern Region of British Railways and conveniently used the "no more crack expresses" edict to get revenge on its pre-Nationalisation rival the Southern Railway by withdrawing altogether the SR's Atlantic Coast Express, which worked beyond Exeter, and replacing it with a semi-fast Waterloo–Exeter service hauled by D800s. The WR also reduced its former rival's main line to single track for long stretches west of Salisbury.

The late 1960s saw a brief revival in the fortunes of the D800s. For a few months in late 1967 they moved on to the Paddington–Birmingham New Street route and then in early 1968 Paddington–Hereford. Rising traffic levels on the Paddington–Plymouth route meant the WR aspired to an hourly service interval for this route with standard 10 and 12 carriage trains. The maximum schedule was to be 4 hours 15 minutes for the 225.5 mi (362.9 km), but the "Cornish Riviera Express" would be retimed for 3 hours 45 minutes with stops at Taunton and Exeter only. The Class 52 Westerns could only cope with these timings on seven carriage trains. The answer was to assemble pairs of D800s and reinstate the multiple working equipment on them, allowing the pair to be controlled by one driver. This was done with D819/22–24/27–29/31/32 and D866–69 and the acceleration in schedules did bring a further 7% increase in traffic levels. It was not, however, without its problems: a fault on one locomotive in a multiple-unit pair effectively disabled both and one alone could not keep to the schedules. By 1969 only two services were booked for a pair of D800s, albeit losing a further 15 minutes off the schedule, and the timetable was largely recast into separate Torbay and Plymouth trains, instead of being split en route. This allowed the formations to revert to eight or nine carriages that a single Western could handle alone.

From 4 October 1971 onwards, Class 33s were scheduled to take over from the Class 42s on Waterloo - Exeter services. However, even before this, they were being used as pilot locomotives on some services.

== Withdrawal ==
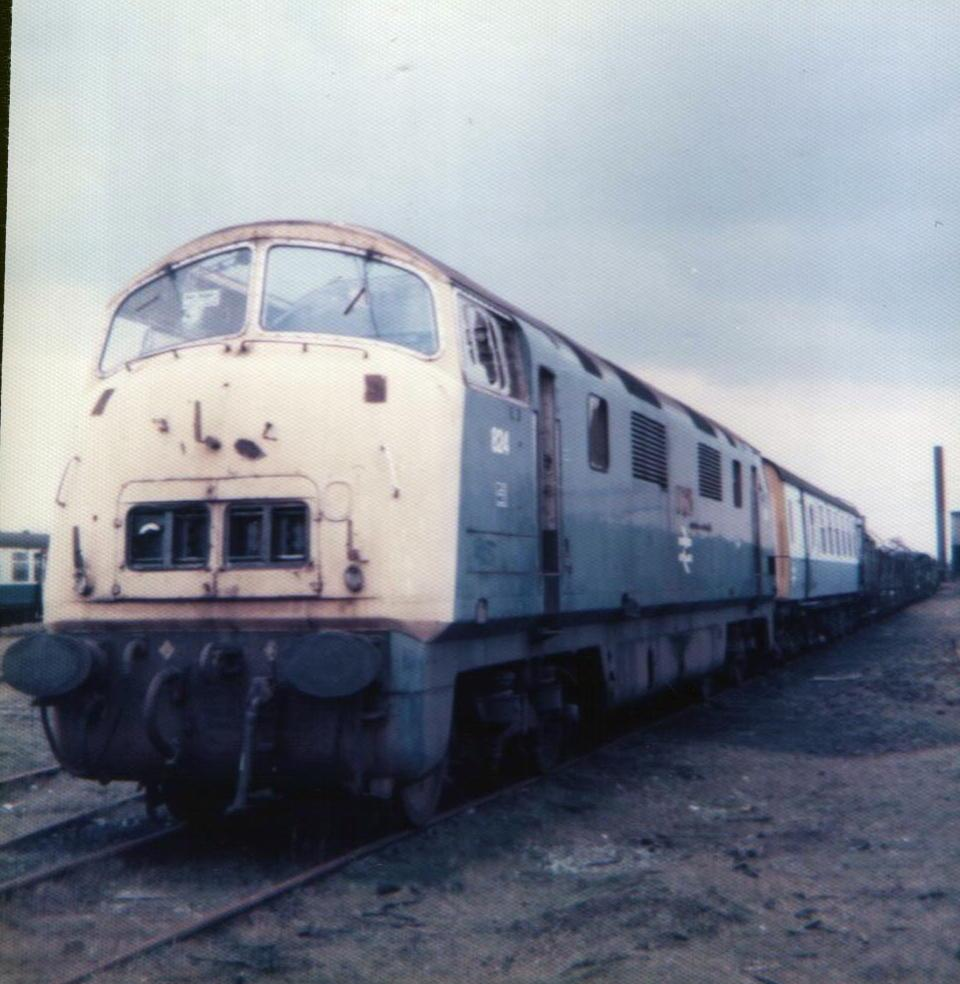
By the end of 1972, all the Class 42s had been withdrawn from service. Here, D824 sits at Swindon Works, a couple of months before being scrapped.

Prejudice against hydraulic transmission among the heads of BR's engineering divisions led them to announce in 1967 that all the WR's diesel-hydraulics were non-standard and should be withdrawn as soon as possible. Compounding this were practical problems modernising the D800s: because of the scaled-down bodyshell, there was very little room inside for extra equipment. It was, for example, physically impossible to accommodate a compressor as well as an exhauster, so the locomotives were unable to haul newer designs of air-braked coaching stock. It also proved impractical to equip them with electric train heating (ETH) equipment for similar reasons, so they retained unreliable steam heat boilers to the end of their lives. It was intended to equip D870 with ETH, and to provide the necessary additional power, the engines were planned to be uprated by the fitment of charge-air coolers. However, no work was actually carried out other than the fitment of appropriate jumper cables on the locomotive ends.

The pilot build trio were all withdrawn by early October 1968, these being followed by the Paxman engined D830 and three of the NBL Class 43s (840/48/63) in 1969 and then the mass withdrawals of 1971 which saw the NBLs extinct by October. Several of the BR Class 42s soldiered on into 1972 and the last were withdrawn by the end of the year. Many withdrawn examples were hastily cannibalised for spare parts to keep the others going as stocks had been reduced in anticipation of a swifter end to D800 operation than was in the event possible. The "Cornish Riviera Express" remained booked for two D800s until the May timetable change in 1970. The early withdrawal dates meant that TOPS numbers were never worn, although the Swindon-built locomotives were allocated TOPS Class 42 and the NBL examples Class 43.

D829 Magpie had gained celebrity status due to its appearance on the popular TV show of the same name and there was an attempt to preserve the engine. But the plans to save the engine were unsuccessful and the locomotive was scrapped.

Year	Quantity in service at start of year	Quantity withdrawn	Locomotive numbers	Notes
1968	38	3	D800–02	
1969	35	1	830	
1970	34	0	–	
1971	34	15	804/08–09/15/17/19/22–23/26/28/31/67–70	
1972	19	19	803/05–07/10–14/16/18/20–21/24–25/27/29/32/66	D821 and D832 preserved.

== Post-BR use and preservation ==
=== D818 'Glory' ===
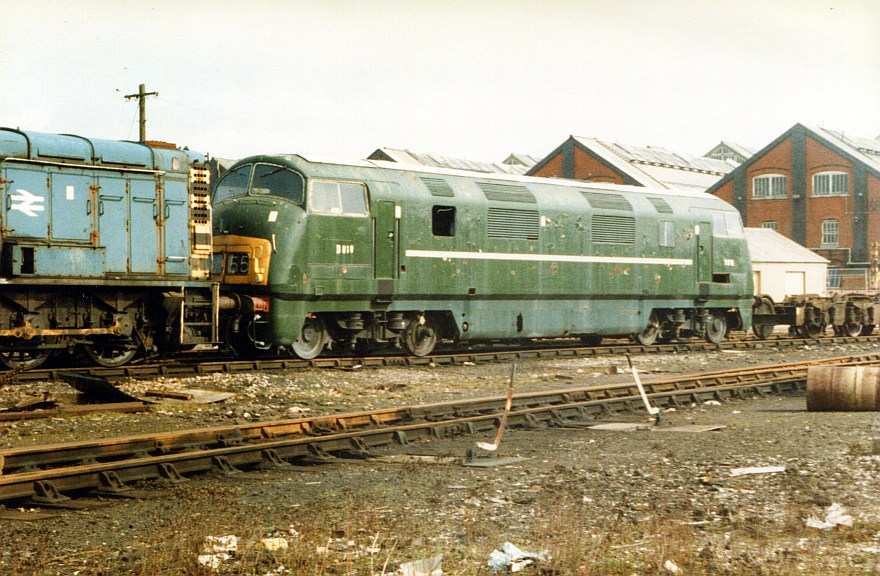
D818 Glory at Swindon Works in 1985, shortly before its scrapping.

D818 became a "pet" of the employees of Swindon Works and was repainted from Rail Blue with full yellow ends back into its original green livery. There was hope it would eventually be preserved but it was scrapped before the works closed in 1985.

=== D821 'Greyhound' ===
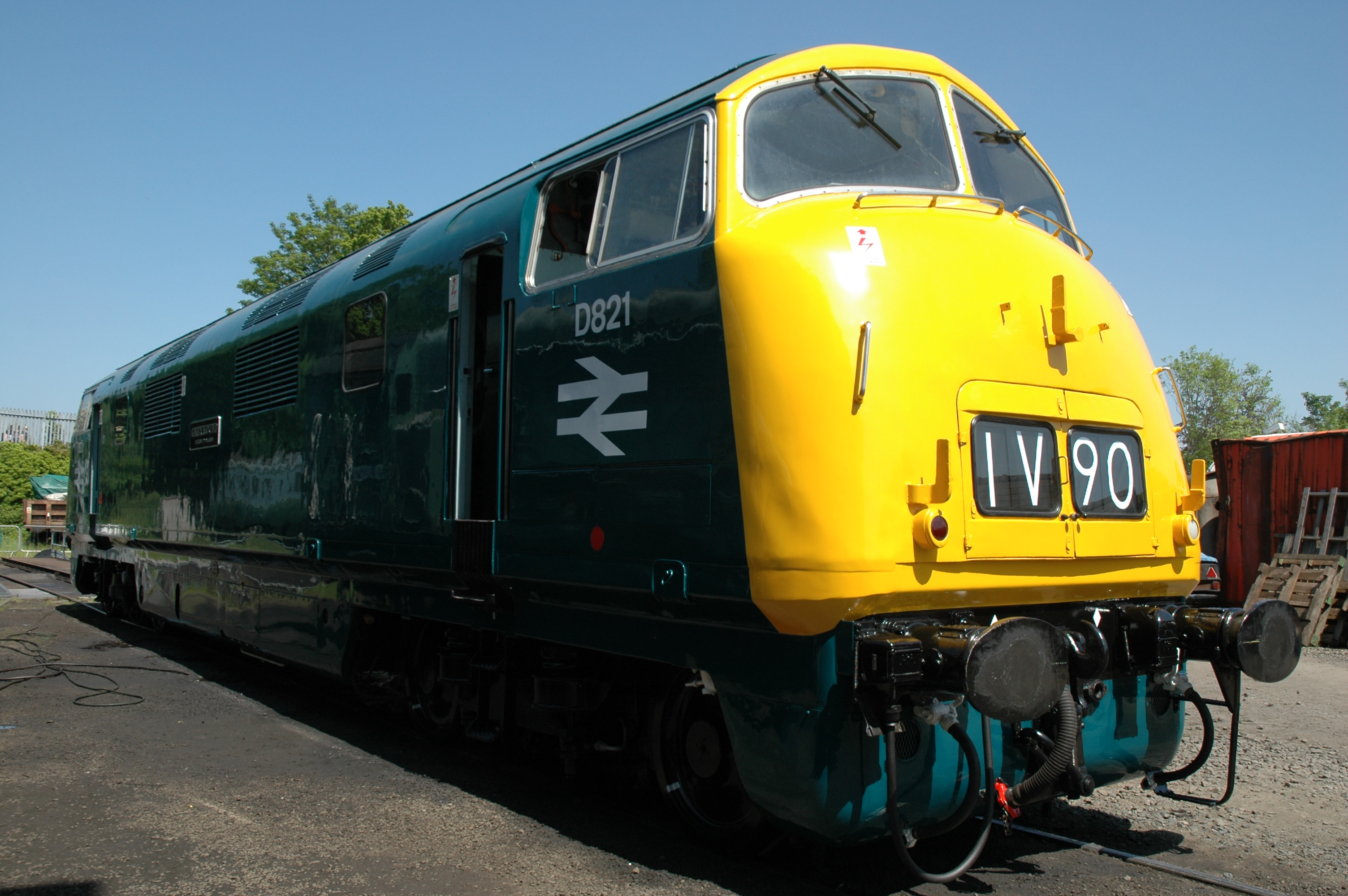
D821 Greyhound sits outside Kidderminster Depot in 2023 having just been refurbished

Around 1971, an approach was made by the Diesel Traction Group seeking to purchase Class 22 D6319. A price was agreed, but it was accidentally scrapped at Swindon before it could be retrieved. British Rail offered the buyers their choice of the remaining Warships (D810, D812, D821 and D832) for the same price. D821 was in the best mechanical condition and thus became the first preserved ex-BR mainline diesel locomotive on 24 May 1973.

=== D832 'Onslaught' ===
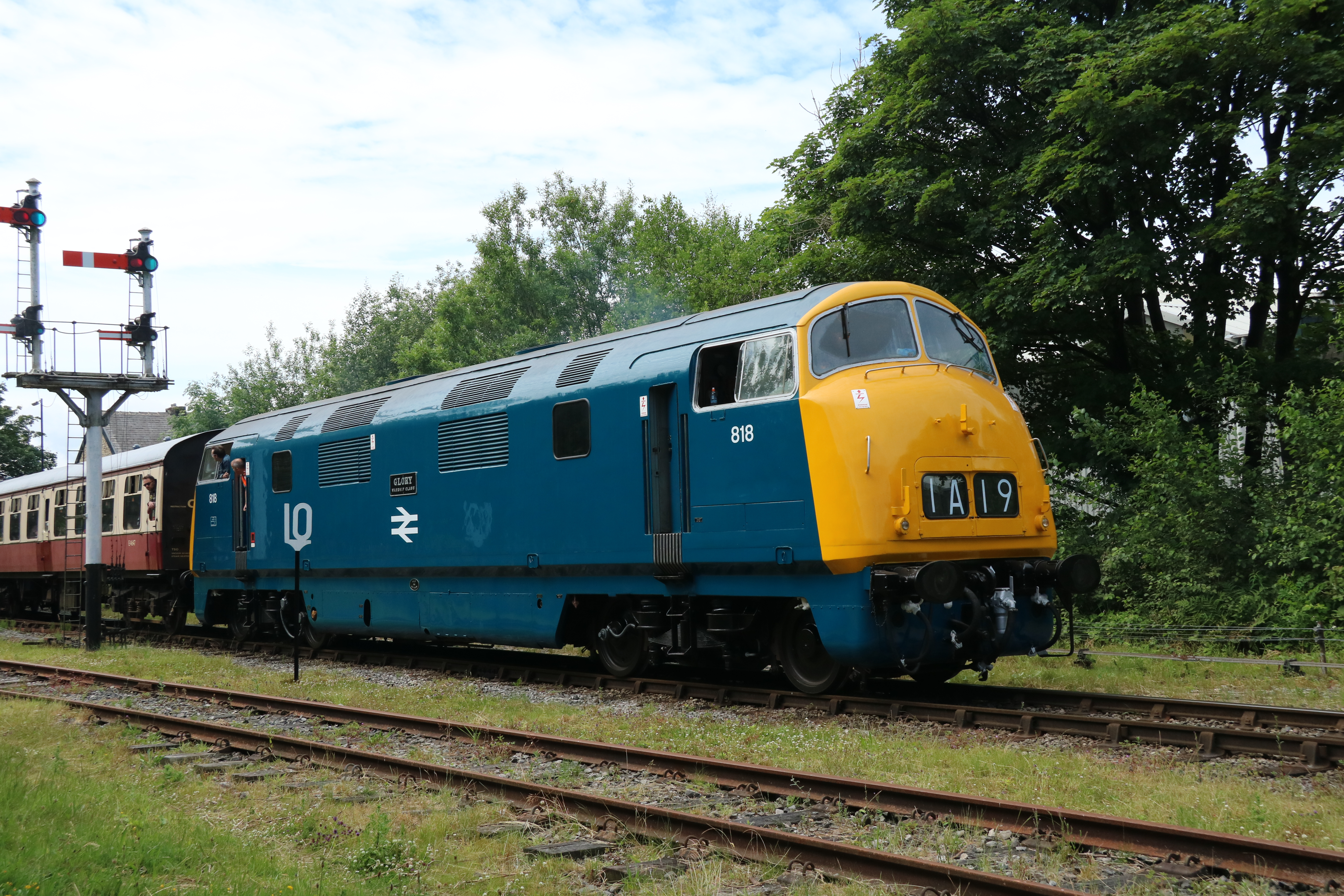
D832 Onslaught departing Ramsbottom East Lancashire Railway in 2021. The locomotive was temporarily renumbered and renamed 818 Glory in recognition to the parts donated from sister locomotive.

D832 was sent to the Railway Technical Centre at Derby where it was used for various research purposes before purchase for preservation. D832 was restored to operating condition using many parts from D818.

Both locomotives are operational, Greyhound on the Severn Valley Railway and Onslaught on the East Lancashire Railway.

== Class details ==
Key:	Preserved	Scrapped

Running number	Name	Date to traffic	Date withdrawn	Notes
D800	Sir Brian Robertson	11 August 1958	5 October 1968	Built at Swindon, lot no. 428. Date of order January 1956. Scrapped July 1969 at J Cashmore Ltd, Newport
D801	Vanguard	7 November 1958	3 August 1968	Scrapped October 1970 at Swindon
D802	Formidable	16 December 1958	5 October 1968	Scrapped November 1970 at Swindon
D803	Albion	16 March 1959	1 January 1972	Built at Swindon, lot no. 437. Date of order February 1957. Scrapped 6 October 1972 at Swindon
D804	Avenger	23 April 1959	3 October 1971	Scrapped 24 March 1972 at Swindon
D805	Benbow	13 May 1959	24 October 1972	Scrapped 16 May 1973 at Swindon
D806	Cambrian	3 June 1959	2 November 1972	Scrapped 1 May 1975 at Swindon
D807	Caradoc	24 June 1959	26 September 1972	Scrapped 3 November 1972 at Swindon
D808	Centaur	8 July 1959	3 October 1971	Scrapped 25 February 1972 at Swindon
D809	Champion	19 August 1959	3 October 1971	Scrapped 6 October 1972 at Swindon
D810	Cockade	16 September 1959	3 December 1972	Scrapped 26 September 1973 at Swindon
D811	Daring	14 October 1959	1 January 1972	Scrapped 13 October 1972 at Swindon
D812	The Royal Naval Reserve 1859–1959	12 November 1959	3 November 1972	Was to have been named Despatch; Scrapped 4 July 1973 at Swindon
D813	Diadem	9 December 1959	1 January 1972	Scrapped 30 September 1972 at Swindon
D814	Dragon	1 January 1960	7 November 1972	Scrapped 20 February 1974 at Swindon
D815	Druid	20 January 1960	3 October 1971	Scrapped 13 October 1972 at Swindon; Name plates now on a narrowboat
D816	Eclipse	17 February 1960	1 January 1972	Scrapped 22 September 1972 at Swindon
D817	Foxhound	9 March 1960	3 October 1971	Scrapped 10 March 1972 at Swindon
D818	Glory	30 March 1960	1 November 1972	Not scrapped until November 1985 at Swindon
D819	Goliath	25 April 1960	3 October 1971	Scrapped 3 March 1972 at Swindon
D820	Grenville	4 May 1960	2 November 1972	Scrapped 15 August 1973 at Swindon
D821	Greyhound	25 May 1960	3 December 1972	Preserved at Severn Valley Railway. Has carried the name Chris Broadhurst in preservation.
D822	Hercules	15 June 1960	3 October 1971	Scrapped 18 February 1972 at Swindon
D823	Hermes	6 July 1960	3 October 1971	Scrapped 19 May 1972 at Swindon
D824	Highflyer	27 July 1960	3 December 1972	Scrapped 18 June 1975 at Swindon
D825	Intrepid	24 August 1960	23 August 1972	Scrapped 27 October 1972 at Swindon
D826	Jupiter	7 September 1960	18 October 1971	Scrapped 21 January 1972 at Swindon
D827	Kelly	4 October 1960	1 January 1972	Scrapped 13 October 1972 at Swindon
D828	Magnificent	19 October 1960	28 May 1971	Scrapped 7 April 1972 at Swindon
D829	Magpie	23 November 1960	26 August 1972	Scrapped 30 January 1974 at Swindon
D830	Majestic	19 January 1961	26 March 1969	Scrapped 22 October 1971 at Swindon
D831	Monarch	11 January 1961	3 October 1971	Scrapped 3 June 1972 at Swindon
D832	Onslaught	8 February 1961	16 December 1972	Preserved at East Lancashire Railway.
D866	Zebra	24 March 1961	1 January 1972	Built at Swindon, lot no. 448. Date of order April 1959. Scrapped 13 October 1972 at Swindon
D867	Zenith	26 April 1961	18 October 1971	Scrapped 30 September 1972 at Swindon
D868	Zephyr	18 May 1961	3 October 1971	Scrapped 7 April 1972 at Swindon
D869	Zest	12 July 1961	3 October 1971	Scrapped 23 June 1972 at Swindon
D870	Zulu	25 October 1961	28 August 1971	Withdrawn following minor accident damage which was not deemed worth repairing. Scrapped 12 May 1972 at Swindon

=== Notes on withdrawal dates ===
The dates presented are as given by Reed. A correspondent in issue 137 of Traction magazine reports some inaccuracies in these dates. For example, the correspondent claims to have seen D828 Magnificent throughout June 1971 and on 4 July 1971 being hauled dead by Class 22 D6326 with fire damage and presumed to be heading for withdrawal at Newton Abbot depot. D831 Monarch worked the 16:05 Exeter St David's to Barnstaple service and 17:55 return on 6 October 1971, three days after its supposed withdrawal. D826 Jupiter hauled D808, D819, D822 and D868 on a Newton Abbot to Bristol service on 10 October 1971, being requisitioned at Exeter on its return run to haul the 16:05 Barnstaple service owing to a severe locomotive shortage.

D812 is claimed to have been in use long after 3 November 1971 and although D810 Cockade was withdrawn on 4 November 1971, it was reinstated on the 7th. On that same day, the correspondent notes D814 in use to power a convoy of D832 and D812 to Plymouth Laira depot where D814 was finally withdrawn, with D812 remaining in traffic. The situation with D832 is unclear because of its transfer to the technical department at Derby. The final four Warships of either kind (Class 42 or 43) in BR traffic were thus D810, D812, D821 and D824. D812 was in use on express passenger duties as late as 28 November 1972, over a year since its purported withdrawal. The last four locomotives were officially removed from capital stock on 3 December 1972; 821 Greyhound hauled an afternoon Bristol to Plymouth parcels train on that day, being almost certainly the last BR Warship-hauled revenue-earning train.

== Model railways ==
First to produce a Class 42 in model form was Minitrix who produced British N gauge models of D815 Druid and D816 Eclipse in both Rail Blue and BR Green in 1970. In 1972 the numbers and names were changed, with the Rail Blue version being D823 Hermes and the BR Green version D805 Benbow. Subsequent production runs with updated mechanism were made in 1974 of D823 Hermes in Rail Blue, and then a further update in 1979 with the same loco plus D825 Intrepid in BR Green. In each case the model in BR green was with full yellow warning panels. From 2008, Bachmann produced a British N gauge model of the D814 Dragon in BR green.

In 1960 the first OO gauge models were produced by Trix which was followed in 1979 by one from Mainline Railways (then owned by Palitoy). D824 Highflyer was modelled in BR Green with small yellow warning panels and 827 Kelly in Rail Blue, these models appearing in the catalogue in that year. In 1980 a further livery was offered in the form of D823 Hermes in BR Maroon with small yellow warning panels, and the class appeared once more in the 1981 catalogue. This model was then later offered by Bachmann in 1998 and 2010. A rival model was offered by Lima in 1980 and subsequently in 2014 by Hornby Railways launched its first version of the BR Class 42, which is a basic representation of the prototype, as part of their Railroad range in BR Green and Maroon in OO gauge. In 2024, it was announced that a new example was to be produced by Heljan, this project is still going ahead after the acquisition by Accurascale.

The German company Fleischmann made the Class 42 in HO gauge for many years. The final catalogue listing was in 2007/08. Model no. 4246 was in BR green and model no. 4247 BR blue.

Heljan A/S of Denmark produced the Class 42 in 0 Gauge, with 10 variations available including D815 "Druid", D827 "Kelly", D866 "Zebra", D869 "Zest" and 829 "Magpie". Tower Models of Blackpool also commissioned a limited edition in BR Green. Heljan have recently also produced a OO version, both DC and DCC sound fitted being available
