= William Renwick =

William or Bill Renwick may refer to:

- Bill Renwick (1929–2013), New Zealand educationalist
- William Renwick (politician) (1915–1981), member of the Pennsylvania House of Representatives
- William Lindsay Renwick (1889–1970), professor of English Literature
- William Renwick (rugby union) (1914–1944), Scottish rugby union player
- William Renwick (surgeon), English naval surgeon and author
