= Frow =

Frow or FROW may refer to:

- Froe, tool for cleaving wood by splitting it along the grain
- John Frow, Australian professor of English
- Toby Frow, director of 2007 BBC radio play 20 Cigarettes
- Foundation for Recognition of Ontario Wildlife, Canadian non-governmental organisation
