= Maynard Mack =

American Literary Critic and Academic

- Born: October 27, 1909; Hillsdale, Michigan, United States
- Died: March 17, 2001 (aged 91); New Haven, Connecticut, United States
- Education: Yale University (Ph.D)
- Occupations: Literary critic, writer, professor
- Spouse: Florence Brocklebank (m. 1934)
- Children: 3

Maynard Mack (October 27, 1909 – March 17, 2001) was an American literary critic and English professor. Mack earned both his bachelor's degree (1932; Alpheus Henry Snow Prize) and Ph.D. (1936) at Yale. An expert on Shakespeare and Alexander Pope, Mack taught at Yale University for many years, starting as an instructor of English in 1936 and ending his career as Sterling Professor Emeritus of English. He was remembered as an inspiring lecturer whose lectures on Shakespeare were described in one account as "unforgettable." He was president of Yale's Phi Beta Kappa chapter. He retired in 1978 after a long teaching career of 45 years at Yale University . He died at his home in New Haven on March 17, 2001 at the age of 90. An anonymous donor contributed in 1996 for installing an English department professorship in Mack's name. ( source - news.yale.edu dated 19 March 2001 )

== Works ==
=== Books ===
- King Lear in Our Time. Berkeley, University of California Press. 1965.
- (Co-editor with Ian Gregor) Imagined Worlds: Essays on Some English Novels and Novelists in Honour of John Butt (London: Metheun & Co., 1968)
- Mack, Maynard (1969). The Garden and the City : retirement and politics in the later poetry of Pope, 1731-1743. University of Toronto Press. ISBN 9780802052094.
- Mack, Maynard (1982). Collected in Himself : essays critical, biographical, and bibliographical on Pope and some of his contemporaries. University of Delaware Press. ISBN 9780874131826.
- Poetic Traditions of the English Renaissance (1982)
- The Last and Greatest Art (1984)
- Mack, Maynard (1985). Alexander Pope : a life. Norton. ISBN 9780393022087.
- Prose and Cons: Monologues on Several Occasions (1989)
- Everybody's Shakespeare: Reflections Chiefly on the Tragedies. 1993.
- (as editor) The Twickenham Edition of the Poems of Alexander Pope (1939-1969) (12 vols.)
- (as series editor) Twentieth Century Views (Prentice-Hall, Inc., 156 vols.)
- (as series editor) Twentieth Century Interpretations (Prentice-Hall, Inc., 97 vols.)
- (as series editor) New Century Views (Prentice-Hall, Inc., 17 vols.)

== See also ==
- Literary criticism
- English studies
- Alexander Pope
- William Shakespeare
- Sterling Professor

== Sources ==
- "Maynard Mack; English Professor; 90". New York Times. 21 March 2001.
- "Obituary: Maynard Mack, Distinguished Yale Scholar and Literature Teacher". YaleNews. 19 March 2001.
- "Prof Maynard Mack". The Telegraph. 28 March 2001.
