= Ian Gregor =

British literary scholar (1926–1995)

Ian Copeland Smith Gregor (20 January 1926 – 13 November 1995) was a British literary scholar. From 1969 to 1988, he was professor of modern English literature at the University of Kent, where he had been an academic since 1965. He had previously taught at the University of Edinburgh from 1958 to 1965 and King's College London from 1956 to 1958, having studied at the universities of Newcastle and Oxford.

== Publications ==
- (with Brian Nicholas) The Moral and the Story (London: Faber and Faber, 1962)
- (with Mark Kinkead-Weekes) William Golding: A Critical Study (London: Faber and Faber, 1967; 2nd edn, 1984)
- (Co-editor with Maynard Mack) Imagined Worlds: Essays on Some English Novels and Novelists in Honour of John Butt (London: Metheun & Co., 1968)
- (Editor) Matthew Arnold's Culture and Anarchy: An Essay in Political and Social Criticism: A Critical Edition (Indianapolis: Bobbs-Merril, 1971)
- The Great Web: The Form of Hardy's Major Fiction (London: Faber and Faber, 1974)
