= Denis Donoghue (academic) =

Irish and American literary critic (1928–2021)

Denis Donoghue (1 December 1928 – 6 April 2021) was an Irish-American literary critic. He was the Henry James Chair of English and American Letters at New York University.

== Life and career ==
Donoghue was born at Tullow, County Carlow, into a Roman Catholic family, the youngest of four surviving children. He was brought up in Warrenpoint, County Down, Northern Ireland, where his father, Denis, was sergeant-in-charge of the Royal Ulster Constabulary. His mother was Johanna (O'Neill) Donoghue. He was educated by the Irish Christian Brothers at the Abbey Christian Brothers' Grammar School.

He studied Latin and English at University College Dublin (UCD), earning a Bachelor of Arts degree in 1949, an M.A. in 1952, a Ph.D. in 1957, and a D.Litt. (honoris causa) in 1989. He then studied Liederer singing at the Royal Irish Academy of Music. He earned an M.A. at the University of Cambridge in 1964, and returned to Dublin, becoming a professor at UCD.

He married Frances Rutledge, formerly a teacher and flight attendant, on 1 December 1951. The couple had eight children. One, Emma Donoghue, is a writer.

In 1980, he was appointed to the Henry James Chair of English and American letters at New York University.

In 1982 the BBC invited Donoghue to present its annual Reith Lectures. Across six lectures, called The Arts Without Mystery, he discussed how society's rationalisation of art was destroying its mystery.

In 2018, Donoghue married his partner of more than twenty years, Melissa Malouf. Malouf was previously married to literary critic Frank Lentricchia. Malouf is a writer and retired professor. They resided together in Durham, North Carolina, until Donoghue's death at age 92 on 6 April 2021 from natural causes. His first wife, Frances, predeceased him in 2018.

== Works ==
- The Third Voice: Modern British and American Verse Drama (1959)
- The Integrity of Yeats (1964) editor
- An Honoured Guest - New Essays on W.B. Yeats (1965) editor with J.R. Mulryne
- Connoisseurs of Chaos: Ideas of Order in Modern American Poetry (1965)
- The Ordinary Universe: Soundings in Modern Literature (1968) criticism
- Swift Revisited (1968) editor, Thomas Davis Lectures, with Roger McHugh, Matthew Hodgart, Mark Kinkead-Weekes, and John Holloway
- Emily Dickinson (1969)
- Jonathan Swift: A Critical Introduction (1969) editor
- Jonathan Swift, Penguin Critical Anthologies (1971) editor
- Yeats (Fontana Modern Masters, 1971)
- W. B. Yeats, Memoirs (1972) editor
- Thieves of Fire (1973) T.S. Eliot Memorial Lectures.
- Seven American Poets from MacLeish to Nemerov (1975) essays on John Berryman, Richard Eberhart, Randall Jarrell, Robert Lowell, Archibald MacLeish, Howard Nemerov and Theodore Roethke
- The Sovereign Ghost: Studies in Imagination (1976)
- Ferocious Alphabets (1981) criticism
- The Politics of Modern Criticism (1981)
- The Arts Without Mystery (1983) 1982 Reith Lectures
- Creation and Interpretation (1984) with William Barrett, Richard Wollheim
- R. P. Blackmur, Selected Essays (1986) editor
- We Irish : Essays on Irish Literature & Society (1986)
- Reading America: Essays on American Literature (1987)
- America in Theory (1988) editor with Leslie Berlowitz and Louis Menand
- England Their England: Commentaries on English Language and Literature (1988)
- Warrenpoint (1990) memoirs
- The Pure Good Of Theory (1992) Bucknell Lectures in Literary Theory
- Who Says What and The Question of Voice (1992) Princess Grace Irish Library Lectures
- The Old Moderns,: Essays on Literature and Theory (1994)
- Walter Pater: Lover of Strange Souls (1995) biography
- Henry James Complete Stories, 1898-1910 (1997) editor
- Practice Of Reading (1998)
- Words Alone : The Poet T. S. Eliot (2000)
- Adam's Curse: Reflections on Religion and Literature (2001)
- Speaking of Beauty (2003)
- The American Classics (2005)
- On Eloquence (2008)
- Warrenpoint (2013)
- Metaphor (2014)
- The Correction of Taste: On the Late Novels of Henry James (2025)
