= Foxhound (disambiguation) =

A Foxhound is a type of dog.

Foxhound may also refer to:

- FOXHOUND, a fictional special forces group in the Metal Gear video game series
- Foxhound, the service name for the Ocelot, a UK armoured vehicle
- HMS Foxhound, six ships of the Royal Navy
- Foxhound, the NATO reporting name for the Mikoyan-Gurevich MiG-31, a Soviet/Russian interceptor aircraft
