= Alex Kay-Jelski =

British sports journalist

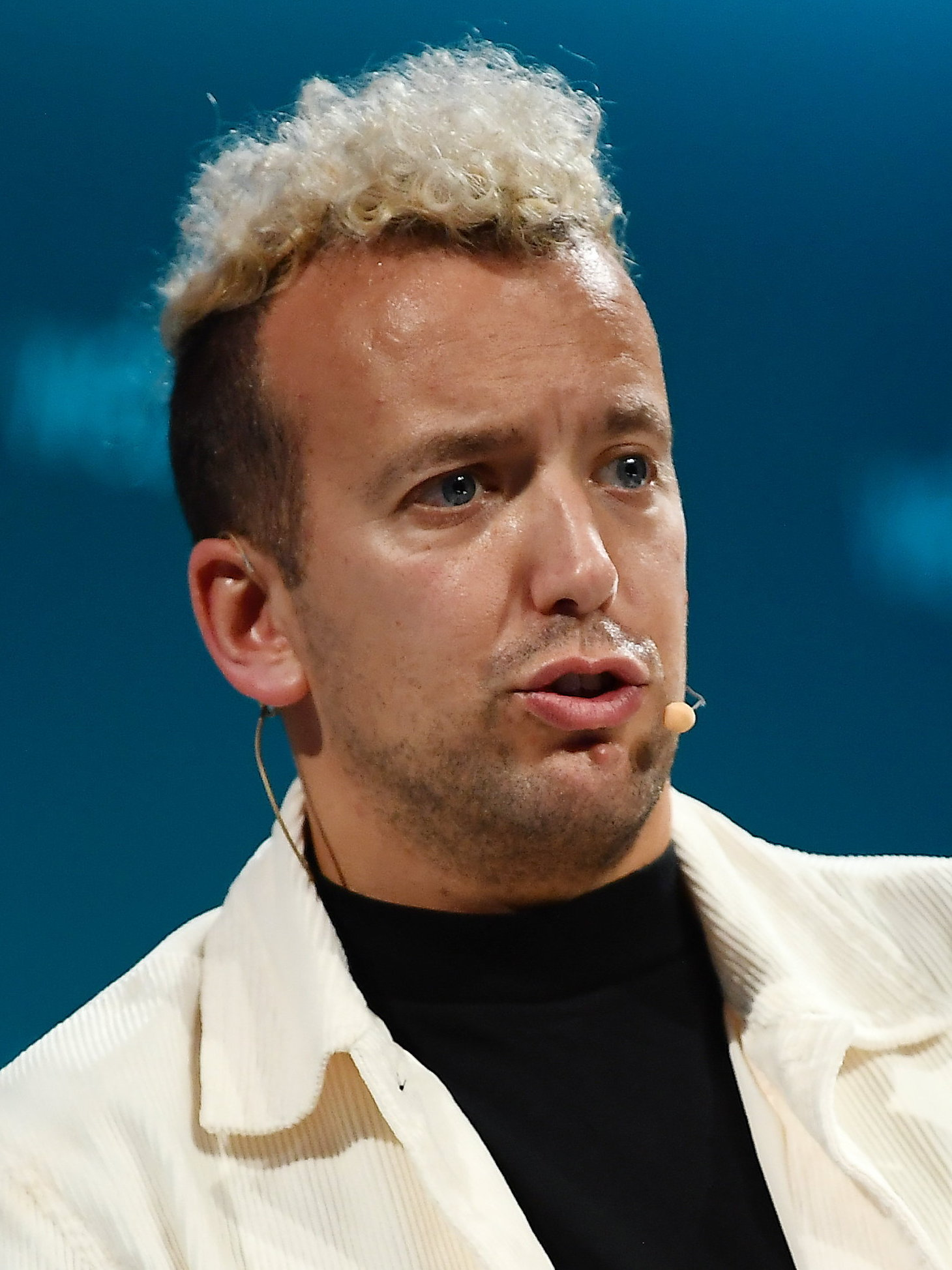
- Kay-Jelski in 2021
- Born: London, England
- Education: University College School
- Alma mater: University of Edinburgh
- Occupation: Journalist
- Years active: 2007-present

Alex Kay-Jelski is a British sports journalist, currently the BBC Director of Sport. He was previously the sports editor of The Times and the Daily Mail newspapers, and the editor-in-chief of The Athletic.

== Early life and education ==
Kay-Jelski was educated at University College School in London. In 2007, he took an MA in French and Spanish from Edinburgh.

== Career ==
Kay-Jelski began his career as a graduate trainee and sub-editor at the Daily Mail in 2007. He was promoted to deputy sports news editor in 2009, before being named the sports editor in 2015—the first openly gay man in such a role. He left the Mail less than a year later to become sports editor at The Times.

Kay-Jelski was recruited in June 2019 to join the startup US sports website called The Athletic. He also had appearances on Sky Sports and TalkSport radio.

In April 2024, Kay-Jelski was announced as the new BBC Director of Sport, replacing Barbara Slater.
