= Horndean Technology College =

Location
- Horndean; Waterlooville, Hampshire, PO8 9PQ; England
- Coordinates: 50.91346°N 1.00898°W

Information
- Type: Community school
- Established: 1970
- Local authority: Hampshire
- Department for Education URN: 116437 Tables
- Ofsted: Reports
- Headteacher: Julie Summerfield
- Gender: co-educational
- Age: 11 to 16
- Houses: McKellen, Turing, Windsor, Goodall, Holmes.
- Website: http://www.horndeantc.hants.sch.uk

Horndean Technology College is a large school, situated in the village of Horndean in Hampshire, England. The school has formerly been called Horndean Community School, Horndean Secondary School and Horndean Bilateral. It is also sometimes informally referred to as Barton Cross, after the road on which its main entrance is situated. The school teaches over 1200 students a range of subjects, and has a large campus with over 11 buildings.

== School campus ==
A block is the main administration block, and it contains the school's library, staff offices, and a large computer suite. It is situated in the middle of the campus. The medical room is in this block, and the main office where pupils are able to come for help, known as student support services (SSS), is near the main entrance to this building.

X block is the maths block, offering Core Maths, Further Maths, Additional Maths and Statistics. The top floor of X Block holds most of the information technology, computer science and Business lessons. The lower school cafe is on the ground floor. This building is situated at the lower end of the school.

C block was previously the Modern Foreign Languages block, and originally the Chemistry block, but is now being used as a pre-school/nursery.

W block is where most of the Design Technology classes are situated. Engineering, Textiles, Pure DT, Resistant Materials, Fashion and Graphic Design are the subjects taught here.

M block is where music lessons are taught. This block is also used for extra-curricular music and instrument tuition lessons, including Drum, Piano, Guitar and Vocal Lessons

G block is the English Language and English Literature block. Physical Education is also taught here, and has the interactive multi-gym situated in this building. There are two halls where indoor PE lessons can be taught; one is known as the "Old Hall", the other "The Gym", not to be confused with the interactive gym.

S block and New S block are the science buildings, which are connected by a glass bridge. Art is also taught on the ground floor of the first building. This building is found at the top of the college, and below the field.

H block is where Food Technology, Religious Studies, Sociology and Hairdressing are taught. It was originally the home of the History department (hence the name) which is now in D block. It is situated right between the main field and D block. Following construction being removed from the curriculum in 2015 H Block is now the new home for the alternative program department. In 2015, D block was refurbished. During the meantime of this many classrooms were moved around including Religious Studies. It was originally planned to be moved back into D block after the refurbishments were completed. However this never came to be, thus RS resides in H block.

D block is where the humanities subjects are taught, History and Geography. It is also the home to the Bedford Center (ASD unit) on the ground floor and the learning support department on the first floor. It is the largest building on the campus, with 4 floors, each floor dedicated to largely one subject, with the only exception being the 2nd floor, where the classrooms are shared equally between both subjects. This building was intended to be a temporary building, but has since been made permanent. D block was refurbished in 2015.

SF block used to be the sixth form section of the school, but since this was eradicated in 2004, it has been used for Drama on the top floor and Foreign Languages throughout the block. The current languages on offer are French and German. Also located on the ground floor of this block is the upper school cafeteria.

Barton Hall is used mainly for the community, with a bar, hall and the community's reception. Barton Hall is also used for assemblies, concerts and activities such as team building.

Sports Hall is a large sports hall between the AstroTurf pitches and G Block. It is larger than the Gym and Old Hall, and stores most of the sports equipment such as the hockey sticks and rounders bats. It has a female changing room on the upper floor, and the male changing rooms on the ground floor. This building is sometimes used for community events, such as football.

The site also has facilities for Physical Education in its field, including Astroturf pitches, a 400m running track, long jump with sandpit, tennis courts and football goalposts.

== Ofsted report (2018) ==
The school had its latest LGBTQReport in 2018.

== Notable former pupils ==
- Rob Hayles - Cyclist
- Emma Barton - Actress
- Marc Wootton - Actor and Comedian
- Mark Wingett - Actor
- Brett Fancy - Actor
- Greg Walker - Regius Professor of Rhetoric, University of Edinburgh

== Achievements ==
- 2018 Cyberquest Whiteley - 2nd Place
