= Brett Fancy =

British actor (1964–2026)

- Born: 4 January 1964; Portsmouth, Hampshire, England
- Died: 11 May 2026 (aged 62)
- Occupation: Actor
- Years active: 1985–2026
- Website: www.brettfancy.com

Brett Fancy (4 January 1964 – 11 May 2026) was an English film, television and theatre actor.

== Life and career ==
Born and raised in Portsmouth, he was the son of Brian Fancy, a HMNB Portsmouth dockyard worker. Fancy attended Horndean School near Portsmouth, known as Mark Fancy and attended Highbury College. It was while working as stage crew at the Chichester Festival Theatre, watching Sir John Mills from the wings, that he decided to become an actor. He auditioned for and attended the Guildhall School of Music and Drama in the Barbican, City of London where he was subsequently awarded the school's gold medal for acting.

Fancy died on 11 May 2026, aged 62.
