= William Greenfield (minister) =

Scottish minister, professor, literary critic, reviewer and author

William Greenfield FRSE (born 1754/55; died 1827) was a Scottish minister, professor of rhetoric and belles lettres, literary critic, reviewer, and author whose clerical career ended in scandal, resulting in him being excommunicated from the Church of Scotland, having his university degrees withdrawn, and his family assuming his wife's patronymic Rutherfurd.

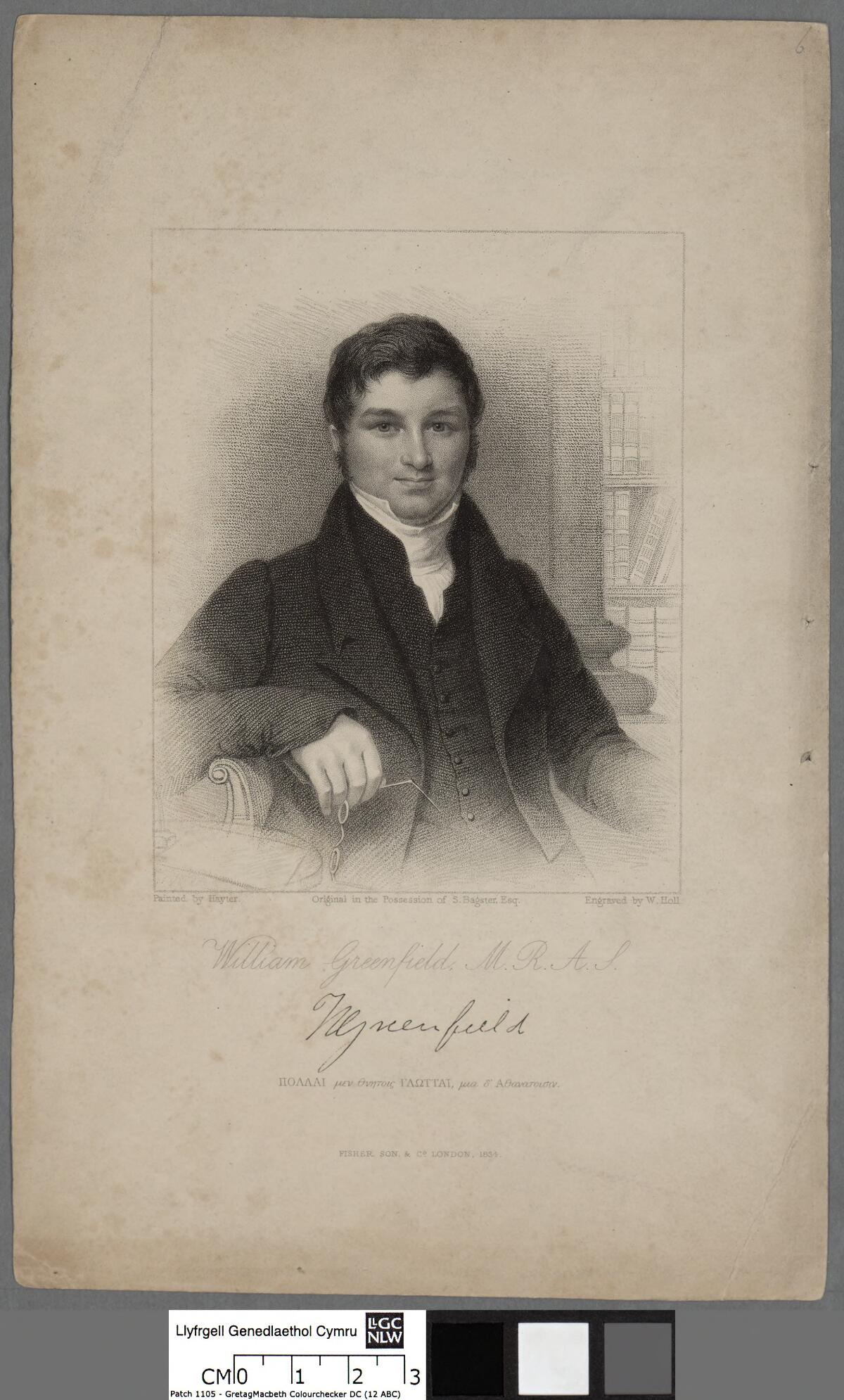
A portrait from the Welsh Portrait Collection at the National Library of Wales. Depicted person: William Greenfield – Scottish minister, literary critic, author and mathematician

He served as joint-minister of Edinburgh's High Kirk (1787–1798), as Moderator of the General Assembly of the Church of Scotland (1796), and as Regius Professor of Rhetoric and Belles Lettres at Edinburgh University (1784–1798). A friend and correspondent of Robert Burns and a beneficiary of Walter Scott, his lecture course in Rhetoric and Belles Lettres had a huge influence on the development of English Literature as a discipline in universities.

== Life ==
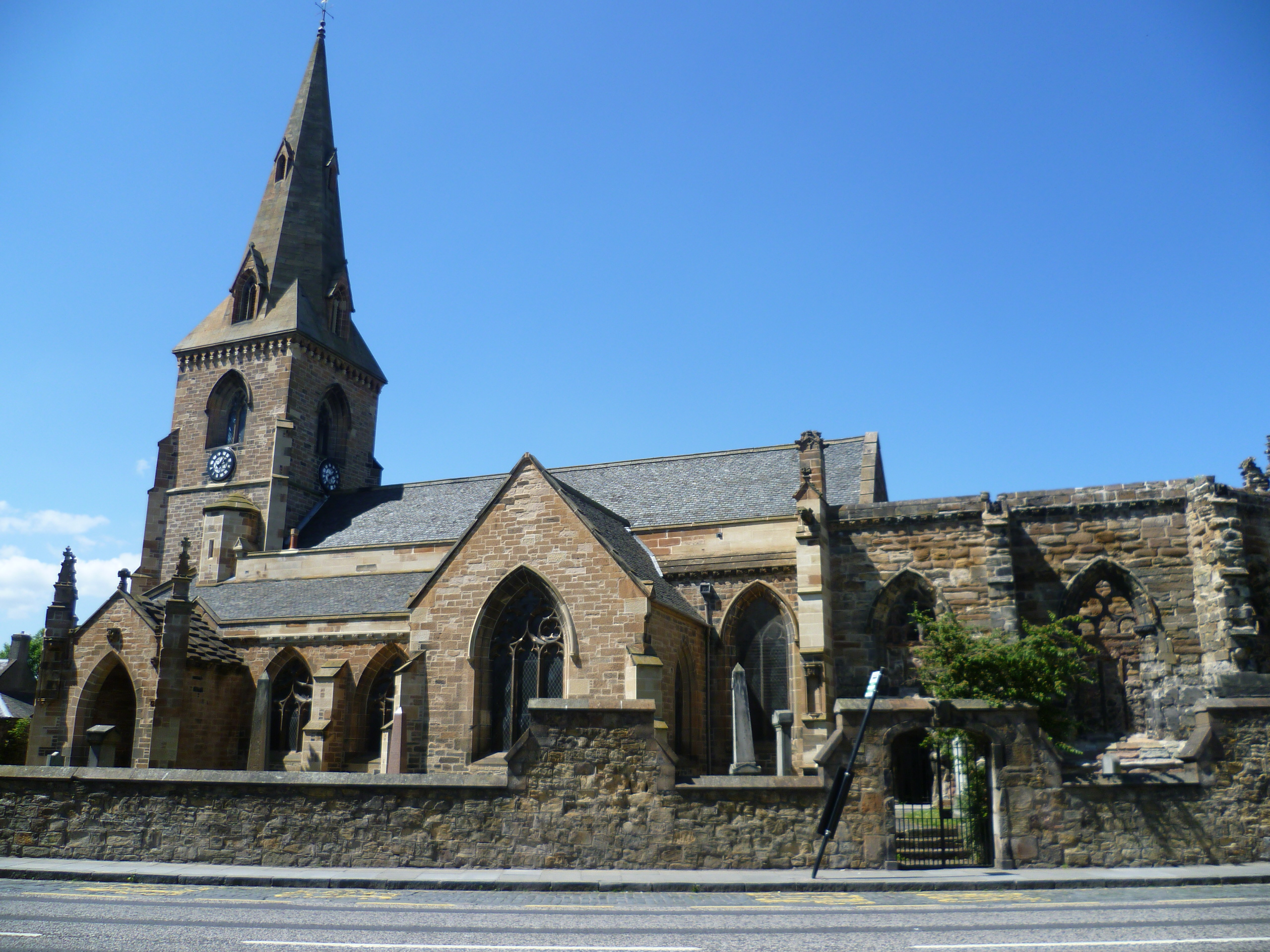
Dalkeith parish church

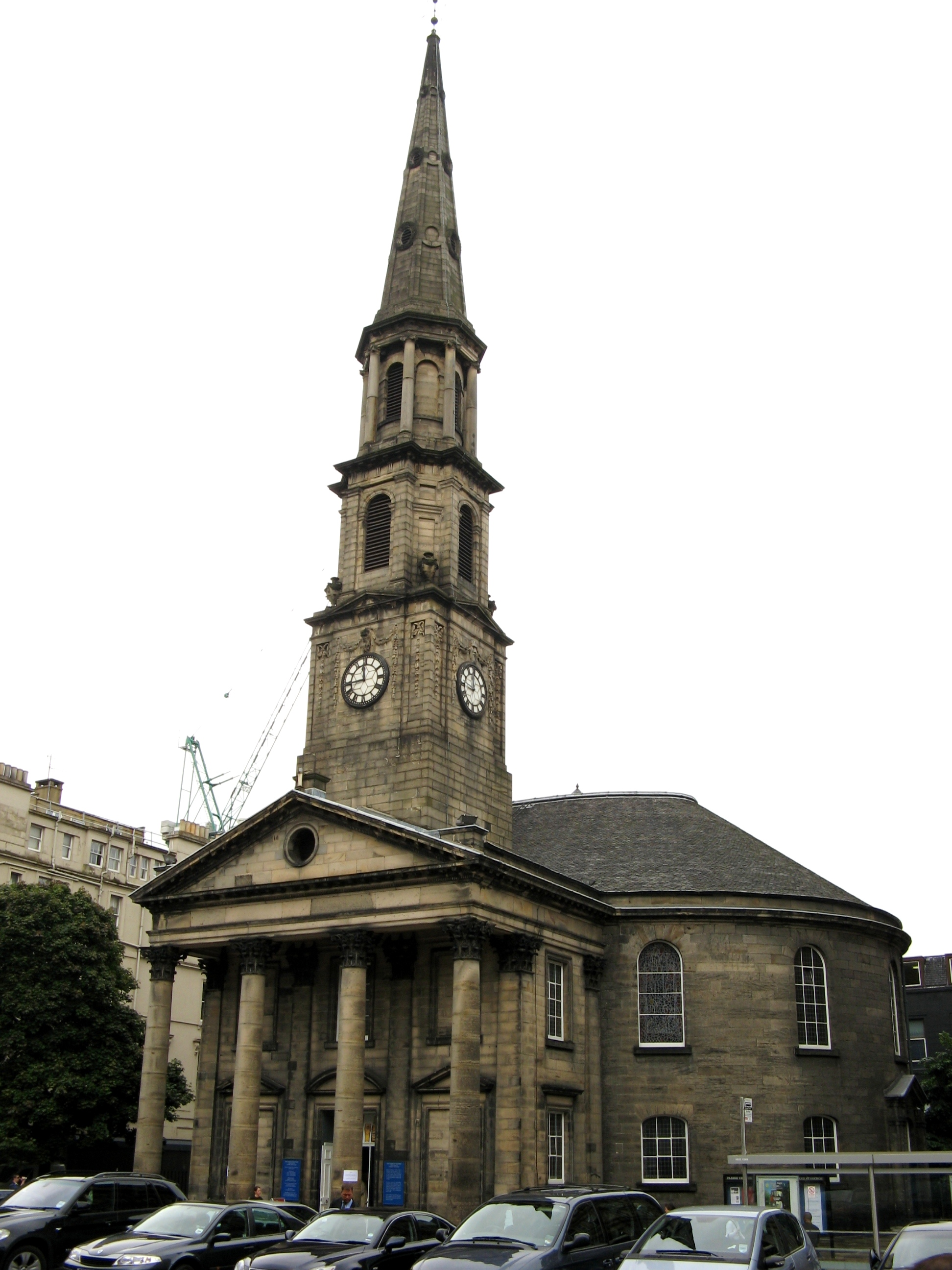
St Andrews Church in Edinburgh

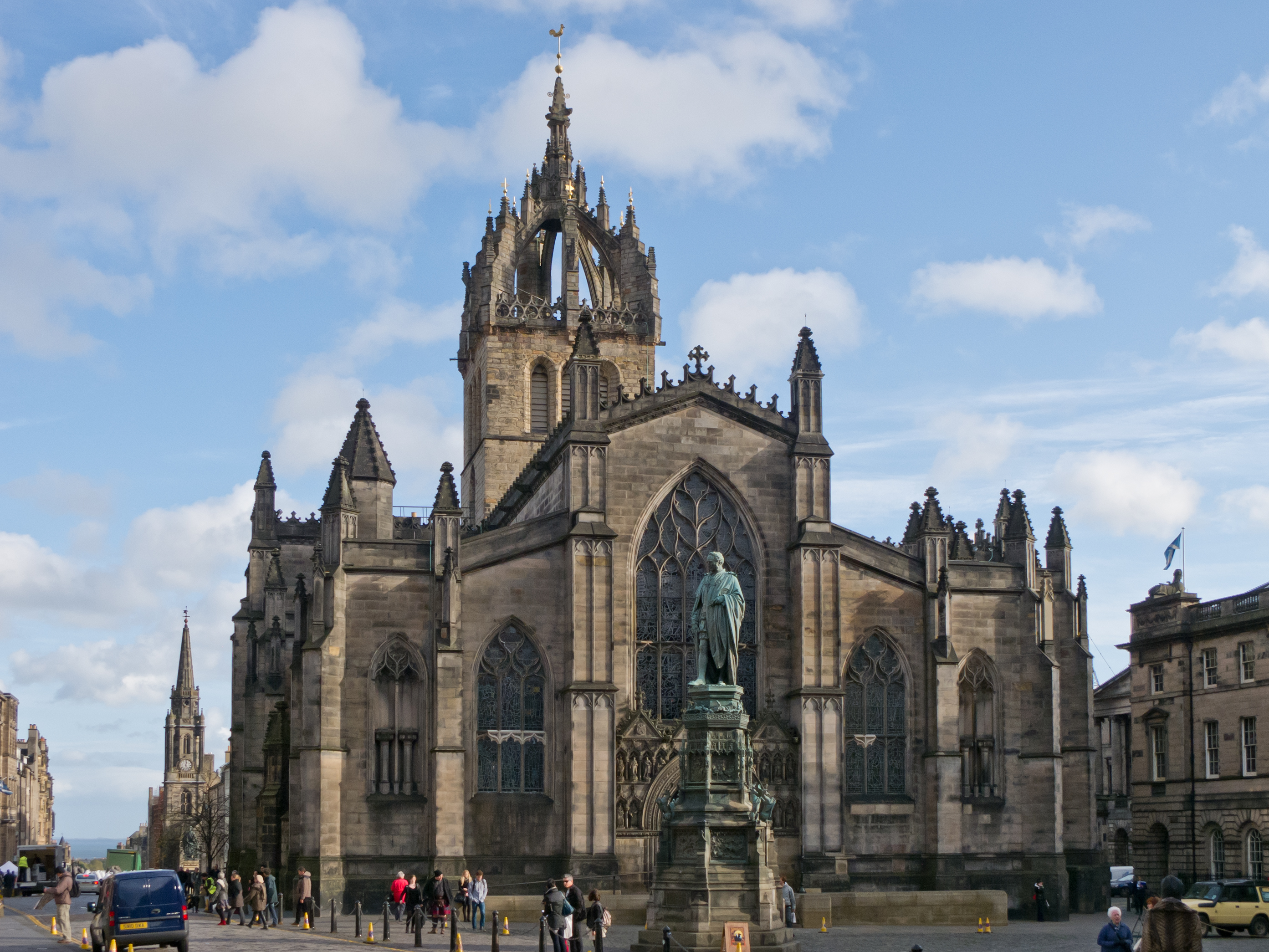
St Giles' Cathedral, or High Kirk, Edinburgh

Greenfield was the third child, and second son of Captain John Greenfield, RN (died 1774) and Grizel Cockburn (daughter of the aged Sir William Cockburn of Cockburn, 2nd Bart., 1662–1751). He was baptised in Dalkeith parish church, Midlothian on 9 February 1755. He matriculated at Edinburgh University in 1774, graduating with MA on 17 April 1778, and was almost immediately (though unsuccessfully) nominated as a Professor of Mathematics at Marischal College, Aberdeen.

He was ordained as a minister of the Church of Scotland to Wemyss Parish on 6 September 1781. He then moved to become the first minister of the new St Andrew's Church in the New Town of Edinburgh on 25 November 1784, until he was appointed Minister of St Giles (or High Kirk) of Edinburgh by the Town Council on 21 February, taking up post on 1 April 1787. He held this post as well as the Regius Professorship of Rhetoric and Belles Lettres (among the first University Chairs in English Literature in the world), which he had held in conjunction with Hugh Blair since 1784, and whom he succeeded. He was made Almoner to the King in March 1789. He "radically altered the size and structure of the Edinburgh course" he took over from Blair, according to Martin Moonie's chapter in Crawford's book. Greenfield had wide interest. He was a member of the Royal Society of Edinburgh, and on 12 April 1784 he read a paper and, later in its Transactions (1788 Vol 1, pp131–145) he published as an article entitled "On the use of negative quantities in the solution of problems by Algebraic Equations". (His son, Andrew Rutherfurd, attached a biographical note to his copy of this article, without revealing that the author was his father). Greenfield also delivered lectures in Natural Philosophy, the manuscripts of which are still retained in Edinburgh University Library.

== Success ==
He was made Doctor of Divinity by Edinburgh University on 31 March 1789, in the same month as being made Almoner to the King. He was later Dean of the Faculty of Arts, and became Moderator of the General Assembly of the Church of Scotland on 19 May 1796. From that session, he sent a letter to King George III, congratulating him on having escaped an assassination attempt, and one to the Prince of Wales, later George IV, congratulating him on his (ill-fated) engagement to Princess Caroline of Brunswick. Robert Burns writes affectionately and admiringly of him in his second Commonplace Book "he is a steady, most disinterested friend, without the least affectation, of seeming so; and as a companion, his good sense, his joyous hilarity, his sweetness of manners and modesty, are most engagingly charming." In 1793 he was elected a member of the Harveian Society of Edinburgh (where he was subsequently appointed to the honorific role of Pontifex Maximus) and in 1796 he was elected a member of the Aesculapian Club. Membership of both was usually reserved only for Fellows of the Royal College of Physicians of Edinburgh or the Royal College of Surgeons of Edinburgh.

== Disgrace and after ==
Greenfield was disgraced in December 1798. The records of the Presbytery of Edinburgh state that because of "certain flagrant reports concerning his conduct... [they] laid him under a sentence of excommunication." Sufficiently serious, he voluntarily resigned his Church and University posts as well as that of King's Almoner. The University of Edinburgh revoked his degrees of M.A. and D.D. There is evidence of a public outcry, "a sin peculiarly heinous and offensive in its nature," according to the Presbytery, and a letter by Greenfield resigning and expressing gratitude to his previous colleagues and charges. Later comment indicated he had been discovered in gay relationship with a student. He was omitted from the recollections of his contemporaries in Scotland.

Greenfield fled to Corbridge in Northumberland. He wrote the elegantly written Essays on the Sources of the Pleasures received from Literary Compositions, which he published in 1809. This seems to be a polished and published version of his Edinburgh lecture course. ; In the same year, Sir Walter Scott introduced him to the publisher John Murray. Scott supposedly asked Murray to keep Greenfield's name secret, as he was hiding from creditors. There is no evidence of Greenfield's further connection with Murray, or with any other publisher.

In another instance Scott's letter is quoted and his case described: "You cannot but have heard of that very unfortunate man Dr Greenshields [sic] who for a dishonourable or rather infamous cause was obliged to leave Edinburgh where he was long beloved and admired of every human being..."

Greenfield contributed one review to the Quarterly Review under the name of Richardson. It disapproved morally of the novel Amélie Mansfield by Mme Cottin. He also assumed the name of Rutherfurd, his wife's mother's name. This circumstance led much literary gossip, including The Kaleidoscope magazine to suspect Greenfield as the author of the Waverley or "Scotch" novels. Some thought that Scott was not capable of being the author but Greenfield was. Greenfield was a full and visible and respected member of the Scottish literary scene.

He died in the North of England on 28 June 1827.

== Family ==
He married Janet Bervie (died 1827), daughter of a Kirkcaldy maltman, on 22 November 1782.

His wife assumed the maiden name of her mother (Margaret Rutherford or Rutherfurd). His children seemed to have made successful careers or marriages in the law, army and the Church, suggesting the scandal did not affect them much, well-concealed under the name of Rutherfurd. Their careers and marriages seemed also to have been based in Scotland, which might indicate that Greenfield had left his family there, the North of England being a common refuge for fugitive Scots, near but beyond the jurisdiction. The six children were:

- Margaret, born 25 July 1784
- Hugh Blair Rutherfurd (named after Hugh Blair, Greenfield's predecessor as Professor of Rhetoric), later laird of Crosshill and captain 25th Regiment, born 7 May 1786
- Grizel, born 5 December 1787, who later married Thomas Clark, minister of St Andrew's, Edinburgh, her father's old kirk
- Jane, born 7 July 1789
- Andrew Rutherfurd, Senator of the College of Justice, born 21 June 1791, died 13 December 1854
- James Hunter Rutherfurd, Major in the Royal Engineers (1794–1866)

== Publications ==
- Address, delivered to the congregation of the High Church of Edinburgh, on Thursday the 9th of March 1797, ... by William Greenfield
- Sermon, preached in the high-church of Edinburgh, before His Grace the Earl of Leven and Melville, His Majesty’s High Commissioner, on Thursday the 18th of May 1797, at the opening of the General Assembly of the Church of Scotland. / By William Greenfield
- Dissertatio inauguralis, de methodis exhaustionum, atque rationum primarum et ultimarum: quam, ... ad gradum magistri in artibus liberalibus ... recitabit Gulielmus Greenfield, Edinburgh 1778, Balfour and Smellie
- On the Use of Negative Quantities in the Solution of Problems by Algebraic Equations

== See also ==
- List of moderators of the General Assembly of the Church of Scotland

== Sources ==
- Scott, Hew, Fasti Ecclesiae Scoticanae V4: The Succession of Ministers in the Church of Scotland from the Reformation Edinburgh (1922)
- Burns Encyclopaedia
- Gaillet, Lynée Lewis, Scottish rhetoric and its influences 1998, Lawrence Erlbaum Associates Inc, Mahwah, 07430, New Jersey, USA
- Crawford, Robert, The Scottish Invention of English Literature, Cambridge University Press, 1998, ISBN 0-521-59038-8
- Kaleidoscope, or Literary and Scientific Mirror Vol 1, page 32 A similar comment was made by Andrew Lang in his Editor's Comments to an 1893 complete edition of the Waverley novels.; as well as in Leigh Hunt's Examiner

== Notes ==
Church of Scotland titles
Preceded by James Meek	Moderator of the General Assembly of the Church of Scotland; 1796	Succeeded by John Adamson
