= William Renwick (surgeon) =

British naval surgeon and author

- Born: c. 1740
- Died: October 1814 (aged 76)
- Military career
- Allegiance: Great Britain; United Kingdom
- Branch: Royal Navy
- Service years: 1760–1804
- Rank: Naval surgeon
- Conflicts: Seven Years' War; American War of Independence

William Renwick (c. 1740 – October 1814) was an English naval surgeon and writer.

== Life ==
William Renwick, born about 1740, a native of Berwick-on-Tweed, was in August 1760, being then (according to his own statement) nineteen, appointed surgeon's mate of a regiment at Plymouth, through the interest of General John Crawfurd. In that capacity he was abroad on active service, apparently at the reduction of Belleisle (7 June 1761); and after a two years' absence was invalided, having temporarily lost his eyesight. In June 1763, consequent on the peace, he was reduced, and seems to have unsuccessfully endeavoured to form a medical practice in Berwick. In the by-election of January 1765 he was of some use to Sir John Hussey Delaval, who promised him his interest; on the strength of which, and with no more tangible means of subsistence, he married, in June 1765, Abigail, daughter of Arthur Hindmarsh of Berwick. Poverty pursued him, and for seven years (1766–1773) he left his wife, endeavouring to gain a livelihood as "journeyman apothecary" in London, Wokingham, and elsewhere. When he rejoined his wife about 1774 his endeavour to establish a practice in Berwick met with small success; and in despair he published Misplaced Confidence, or Friendship Betrayed (3 vols. 12mo, 1777), in which he openly related the story of his sufferings, and attacked his former patron, Delaval.

In October 1778, through the interest of the Earl of Lisburne, a Lord of the Admiralty, to whom he had been recommended, he was appointed surgeon of the Countess of Scarborough, which, on 23 September 1779, was captured off Flamborough Head by the squadron under John Paul Jones and taken to the Texel. He wrote a magniloquent description of the engagement in heroic verse. On being exchanged Renwick was appointed to the Marlborough, and, when she was ordered to the West Indies, to the Egmont, in which he was present at the relief of Gibraltar, and in the rencounter off Cape Spartel in October 1782. In February 1784 he was surgeon of the Thorn sloop, and afterwards of the Merlin on the Newfoundland Station, and of the Druid in the Channel and at Lisbon. In 1787 he was put on half-pay, and in 1788 published The Solicitudes of Absence (London, 1788, 12mo), mainly composed of correspondence from and to friends at home. From 1795 to December 1800 he was surgeon of the Vulture; and of the Portland till February 1802, when he was put on half-pay. On 20 June 1804 he was, to his disgust, superannuated "for various infirmities", on three shillings a day.

He retired to Berwick, where he led a solitary and eccentric existence, until his death in October 1814, at the age of seventy-six; he was buried on 25 October.

=== Works ===
Besides several pamphlets on the state of the medical service of the navy, and the two works already mentioned, he wrote The Sorrows of Love, with other Poems (Alnwick, 1810, 12mo); The Unfortunate Lovers, or the genuine Distress of Damon and Celia (London, 1771, 2 vols. 12mo), and probably Damon and Delia, a Tale (London, 1784, 12mo). They are all largely autobiographical.

== Bibliography ==
- Laughton, John Knox (1896). "Renwick, William" . In Lee, Sidney (ed.). Dictionary of National Biography. Vol. 48. London: Smith, Elder & Co. pp. 25–26.
