= Out of Bounds (TV series) =

1977 British television drama series

Out Of Bounds is an action drama serial broadcast on BBC1 in the United Kingdom. It comprised six episodes that were broadcast weekly between 16 March 1977 and 20 April 1977.

The story line involves two teenage gymnasts, a boy and a girl, the girl is played by Barbara Slater, an Olympic gymnast in real life. The elder brother of the boy was being blackmailed by a gang of crooks because his fingerprints were on a gun that had been used in a robbery, though he himself had nothing to do with it. As well as training for a big competition, the two gymnasts endeavoured to help the brother and they successfully got hold of the gun and tracked down the baddie in the sports hall just before the contest.

The series used a small part of Kraftwerk's electronic track Autobahn, as the theme tune.
