= Auguste (1811 privateer) =

French privateer ship 1811–1814

History

France
- Name: Auguste
- Owner: Robert Surcouf
- Commissioned: November 1811
- Fate: Wrecked January 1814

General characteristics
- Complement: 83-95, or 120
- Armament: 10 × 4-pounder guns + 4 × 9-pounder carronades or 16 guns

Auguste (or Augusta) was a French 14-gun privateer commissioned in Saint-Malo in November 1811 under Pierre Jean Marie Lepeltier (or Pelletier). She captured numerous British merchant vessels before the Royal Navy forced her in January 1814 to run onshore and wreck.

== Captures ==
Augusta, of Saint-Malo, and of 14 guns and 120 men, sailed from Saint-Malo on 29 November 1812 in the company of four other privateers. On 3 December she captured four vessels near the Isles of Scilly. the four were: Cape Breton, Breard, master, Providence, Leggett, master, Mary, Baxter, master, and Sparkler, Brown, master. Cape Breton and Providence had been sailing from Cape Breton to Jersey. Mary had been sailing from Prince Edward Island to London, and Sparkler had been sailing from Cadiz to London. Mary was carrying a cargo of wood and Auguste gave her up; she arrived at Cork on 8 December. Cape Breton escaped. (Note: Sparkler, of 179 tons (bm), and two 4-pounder guns, had been built on the Thames in 1797.) Auguste put the crews of the three other vessels aboard Mary, which arrived at Plymouth on 30 December.

In December Augusta captured three vessels: Catherine, Harmony, and Guardian. Catherine, Blyth, master, had been sailing from Suriname to London, and Harmony, Gallop, master, had been sailing from Newfoundland to Poole. Guardian, Musgrave, master, had also been sailing from Suriname to London. (Note: Guardian, of 229 tons (bm), had been launched at Bridlington in 1801. She was armed with six 6-pounder guns and two 9-pounder carronades. The Register of Shipping reported her trade as London–Cape of Good Hope. Harmony, of 123 tons (bm), had been built in Shields in 1801. Catherine was British built, of 243 tons (bm), and was armed with ten 6-pounder guns.)

On 16 December, Augusta, of 16 guns and 110 men, boarded Union, Tweddell, master, at 50°25′N 20°0′E. Augusta had been out of Saint-Malo 16 days. Union, which had been sailing from Prince Edward Island, arrived at Liverpool. (Note: Union, of 234 tons (bm), had been built at Boness in 1801.)

On 24 December HMS Foxhound recaptured Harmony, and the next day Catherine. The recaptured vessels arrived at Plymouth on 1 and 2 January 1813. On 5 January 1813 Lloyd's List reported that Foxhound had recaptured Harmony and Catherine, and that Favorite had recaptured Guardian and sent her into Plymouth.

On 15 February 1813, Auguste sighted a vessel in Cherbourg Roads to which she gave chase. This was Mary, "Hudges" (Hodges), master, which had been sailing from Jamaica to London. Mary was carrying sugar, coffee, rum, and other colonial produce, and Auguste brought her into Havre two days later. Lloyd's List reported that an (unnamed) French privateer had captured Mary. It further reported that the privateer had captured several other vessels, but that as a result of recent gales two had been lost between Barfleur and Cherbourg, and two had been driven on shore near Havre. (Note: French records describe Mary as being of 380 tons. It has not been possible to locate her in either Lloyd's Register or the Register of Shipping.)

On 15 November Auguste, of Saint-Malo, and of 110 men and 14 guns, was off The Lizard when she captured Frederick, Storey, master. Frederick had been sailing from Seville and Lisbon to London; Auguste took her into Paimpol. (Note: Frederick, of 150 tons (bm) and two 3-pounder guns, had been built in Irvine in 1789. French records describe her as being of 205 tons, and armed with two 8-pounder guns.) Her cargo of wool sold for Fr.600,000.

On 18 November Auguste took into Saint-Malo and English brig of about 200 tons (bm). The brig had been sailing from Dublin with a cargo of linens and provisions. Augusta also took into Brehat an English vessel of 100 tons (bm) that was carrying a cargo of Segovia wool.

On 18 December Auguste was off The Lizard when she captured two vessels. Mary, Crow, master, had been sailing from Newfoundland to Dartmouth when captured, and Endeavour, Turner, master, had been sailing from Newfoundland to Teignmouth. Auguste sent Mary into Granville, Manche, and Endeavour into Brehat.

Also in December, Auguste captured James's, Clarke, master, which had been sailing from Malta to London. Auguste sent her into Brehat. (Note: Jamesness, of 159 tons (bm), was a Danish prize. French sources name her as Janus, and describe her as being of 200 tons, armed with four 8-pounder guns, and having a crew of 16.)

Around 20 December a vessel of 100 tons (bm), carrying a cargo of iron, came into Morlaix. She was a prize to Auguste. About the same time Auguste sent into Roscoff a Spanish vessel carrying St Ubes salt. she sent into Lannion an English vessel of 70–90 tons (bm), carrying fish and oil. Lastly, she sent into the same port a vessel of about 180 tons (bm), carrying oil, cream of tartar, and fruit.

== Fate ==
Auguste was wrecked off Béniguet on 23 January 1814. British sources reported on 15 February 1814 that HMS Helicon had chased the schooner Auguste, of 120 men and 16 guns, on shore. Only the captain and 10 men were saved.
