= Barbara Slater (sports producer) =

English sports producer and former gymnast

Barbara Slater CBE
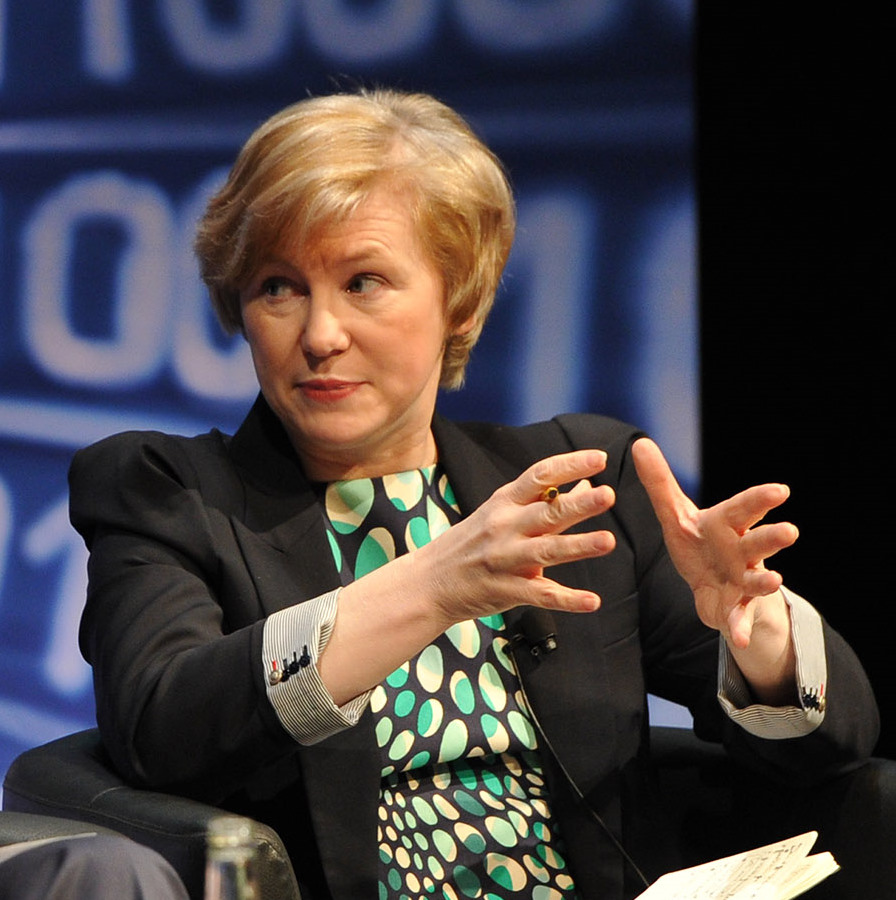
- Barbara Slater at the Nations & Regions Media Conference in 2012
- Born: Barbara Jane Slater; 10 May 1959 (age 66); Birmingham, England
- Occupation: Sports producer
- Years active: 1983-2024
- Known for: BBC Director of Sport

Barbara Jane Slater, CBE (born 10 May 1959) is a former English sports producer, who was BBC Director of Sport for 15 years before retiring in March 2024. She was also an ex-Olympic gymnast who represented Great Britain at the 1976 Olympic Games in Montreal.

Slater became the BBC's first female Director of Sport in April 2009, retiring from the role in March 2024 after overseeing fourteen different football World Cups and European Championships and seven Olympic Games. BBC director-general Tim Davie paid tribute to her career following the announcement of her retirement, saying: “Barbara has had an extraordinary career at the BBC, a pioneer, innovator and outstanding leader, she has kept the BBC at the forefront of sport for a generation." Previous to her Director role, she had been the BBC's Head of Production and Head of General Sports for a number of years. Slater was succeeded as Director of Sport by Alex Kay-Jelski.

== Biography ==
Slater was born into a sporting family: her father, Bill, was a professional footballer who played for England, won the Footballer of the Year award in 1960, and won three Football League titles with Wolverhampton Wanderers. Her uncle, J J Warr, played for the England cricket team.

Slater gained two degrees, at the universities of Birmingham and Oxford, before qualifying to be a PE teacher at Loughborough. Slater appeared in the gymnastics competition at the 1976 Summer Olympics and eventually earned 20 caps as an international gymnast. As a gymnast, she finished runner-up in the British Championships in the same year as her appearance at the Olympics. In other sporting achievements, she reached national standard at diving and was a club-level squash player.

Slater was first employed by the BBC in 1983, when she became a trainee Assistant Producer. She had previous experience in the TV industry starring in the 1977 BBC children's thriller series Out of Bounds, before working for ATV Sport. In 1984, she joined the BBC's sports division as an Assistant Producer. Slater worked her way up the corporation's hierarchy as a Producer, Senior Producer, and Executive Producer. She eventually became head of sports production, and helped produce programmes for events such as The Open and Masters golf, the Commonwealth Games, the Grand National, Ascot and the Derby.

In 2009, it was announced that Slater would become Director of Sport, taking over from Roger Mosey, and becoming the first woman to hold the position. Mosey became the BBC Director of London 2012. Slater has overseen the department's relocation to Salford (BBC Sport is one of five departments that has been moved from London to Salford), as well as the 2012 Summer Olympics, held in London. She has also presided over events such as the 2010 World Cup and 2010 Winter Olympics. Barbara also, in 2013, won back the broadcasting rights of the FA Cup, in a major coup, ensuring live first-class football was available to licence fee payers. Speaking of her appointment, she said "I am thrilled to have this opportunity to lead BBC Sport at such an exciting and challenging time, that includes leading the division to its new home at the heart of BBC North and also ensuring BBC Sport plays its part in making the 2012 Games the success they deserve to be."

During her time as Director of Sport, though, Slater has overseen the loss of many exclusive BBC Sport deals most notably that of full-time Formula One coverage from free to air broadcasting to a shared arrangement with Sky Sports lasting 2012 to 2015 with the BBC showing half the races live and the rest with highlights. The deal allowed Sky Sports to show every race live. Further scrutiny was shown with the BBC portion of a 2012–2018 deal being sold to Channel 4 for the 2016 to 2018 seasons to make savings. This is in addition the Grand National which saw Channel 4 gain the rights in March 2012; further dilution of the BBC sports portfolio (together with the loss of advert-free coverage) was announced by Slater in the guise of a sharing arrangement with ITV; and in September 2015 she announced the imminent loss of yet more live coverage, this time of The Open Championship.

== Honours ==
Following the BBC's successful broadcast of the 2012 Summer Olympics in London, the biggest television event in British broadcasting history, Slater was awarded the Inspirational Woman prize at the Women in Film & TV Award that year.

Slater was appointed Officer of the Order of the British Empire (OBE) in the 2014 Birthday Honours for services to sports broadcasting. In the 2024 King's Birthday Honours, she was promoted to Commander of the Order of the British Empire (CBE).

In 2021, she became the first woman to receive the IBC International Honour for Excellence in recognition of her career in sports broadcasting and for "leading the way in establishing women’s sport and bringing women to the fore in sports", also being cited as a champion of female broadcasters, pundits and commentators.

Slater was named in the BBC Radio 4 Women's Hour Power List 2023: Women in Sport, in recognition of her broadcasting deals for women's sport across football, cricket, rugby and netball.

In the 2024 Birthday Honours, Barbara Slater was appointed a Commander of the Order of the British Empire (CBE) for services to sports broadcasting.
