= Laura Marcus =

British literature scholar (1956–2021)

Laura Marcus FBA
- Born: 7 March 1956; London, England
- Died: 22 September 2021 (aged 65); Bampton, Oxfordshire, England
- Occupation: Literature scholar
- Spouse: Richard Outhwaite (m. 1994)

Academic background
- Education: Warwick University; University of Kent

Academic work
- Institutions: Birkbeck, University of London; University of Sussex; University of Edinburgh; New College, Oxford

Laura Kay Marcus FBA (7 March 1956 – 22 September 2021) was a British literature scholar. She was Goldsmiths' Professor of English Literature at New College, Oxford and published widely on 19th- and 20th-century literature and film, with particular interests in autobiography, modernism, Virginia Woolf and psychoanalysis.

== Background ==
Laura Kay Marcus was born at Queen Charlotte's and Chelsea Hospital in London on 7 March 1956, and was brought up in Willesden, London. She attended Warwick University, during which she spent a year studying at Georgetown University, and graduated in 1978. She then received a master's degree and a doctorate from the University of Kent.

== Career ==
After brief stints at Indiana University–Bloomington, the University of Southampton, the University of Sussex, and the University of Westminster, Marcus taught at Birkbeck, University of London from 1990 to 1998. In 1994, she published Auto/biographical Discourses: Theory, Criticism, Practice, adapted from her doctoral thesis. In 1999, she returned to the University of Sussex for seven years, of which she spent the final three as Professor of English, then went to the University of Edinburgh as the Regius Professor of Rhetoric and English Literature for two years from 2007. She joined New College, Oxford, in 2010.

Marcus won the Modern Language Association's James Russell Lowell Prize for her book The Tenth Muse: Writing about Cinema in the Modernist Period. In 2011, she was elected a Fellow of the British Academy.

She was an editor of the journal Women: a Cultural Review.

== Personal life and death ==
In 1994, Marcus married William Outhwaite. In July 2021, she was diagnosed with pancreatic cancer, and died from the disease at her home in Bampton, Oxfordshire, on 22 September 2021 at the age of 65.

== Books ==
- Auto/biographical Discourses: Theory, Criticism, Practice (1994)
- Virginia Woolf: Writers and their Work (1997/2004)
- The Tenth Muse: Writing about Cinema in the Modernist Period (2007)
- Dreams of Modernity: Psychoanalysis, Literature, Cinema (2014)
- Autobiography: a very short introduction (2018)
- co-ed. The Cambridge History of Twentieth-Century English Literature (2004)
