= HMS Sparkler (1797) =

British Royal Navy gunvessel and merchant ship (1797–1802)

History

Great Britain
- Name: GB No.7
- Ordered: 7 February 1797
- Builder: John Randall, Deptford
- Laid down: February 1797
- Launched: April 1797
- Renamed: HMS Sparkler (August 1797)
- Fate: Sold September 1802

United Kingdom
- Name: Sparkler
- Builder: John Randall, Deptford
- Acquired: 1803 by purchase
- Fate: Wrecked in February 1814

General characteristics
- Class & type: Acute-class gunbrig
- Tons burthen: 16121/94, or 167, or 179 (bm)
- Length: Overall:75 ft 2 in (22.9 m); Keel:61 ft 8 1/4 in (18.8 m)
- Beam: 22 ft 2 in (6.8 m)
- Depth of hold: 8 ft 0 in (2.4 m)
- Armament: Royal Navy: 2 × 24-pounder bow chase guns + 10 × 18-pounder carronades; 1813: 4 × 4-pounder + 6 × 6-pounder guns

HMS Sparkler was an Acute-class gunvessel launched in 1797 as GB No.7 and renamed HMS Sparkler in August 1797. She served the Royal Navy during the French Revolutionary Wars. The Navy sold her in 1802. She became a merchantman. In 1813 a French privateer captured her but the Royal Navy recaptured her shortly thereafter. She was wrecked in February 1814.

== Career ==
Lieutenant Austin Terman commissioned Sparkler in April 1797 for the Channel. In June 1798 Lieutenant William Walker replaced Terman.

On 27 June 1800 on Mr. William O'Kelly, Sparkler's surgeon, came before a Court-martial aboard HMS Gladiator, at Portsmouth harbour. Lieutenant Walker charged Kelly with having behaved in a mutinous, riotous, and disorderly manner. The Court found the charges proved in part and sentence Mr. O'Kelly two years in Marshalsea Prison, and to forfeit his pay.

Less than a week later, on 2 July 1800, Lieutenant Walker himself faced a Court-martial aboard Gladiator. The court found Walker guilty of a number of offences, including theft of provisions, enrolling his one-year-old son as an Able Seaman, and covering up crew desertions while drawing full provisions. The Court found the charges had in part been proven and dismissed Walker from the Navy.

Lieutenant John Stevens took command of Sparkler in August 1800.

In company with other Royal Navy sloops and gun-vessels drove two French sloops ashore at Grandcamp Bay in Northern France on 19 Aug 1800, and destroyed them. A dispatch dated 11 September 1800 credits the ship, along with the cutter HMS Dolphin, HMS Champion, and HMS Bouncer in destroying two more French sloops on 9 September 1800.

On 15 September 1800, Lieutenant Charles Papps Price, of HMS Badger, sighted a French long cutter some four miles off the West Island of the Îles Saint-Marcouf. He sent Lieutenant M'Cullen of the Royal Marines with 24 picked men in Badger's ten-oared galley and six-oared cutter to catch the French vessel. He also signaled Sparkler to draw the fire of two shore batteries, one of two 24-pounder guns and one of two 12-pounder guns, while Badger's boats cut out the French vessel. The French crew ran their cutter on shore and cut her masts and rigging. Nevertheless, the British towed her off despite heavy small-arms fire from the shore. The prize was the privateer rowboat Victoire, mounting four swivel guns, 26 oars, and having a crew of at least 40 men, under the command of Captain Barier. Price described her as "quite new... the completest Boat for the Service of the Islands that possibly could be constructed." The only British casualty was Badger's gunners mate, who took a musket ball to the shoulder.

Lieutenant William Dick replaced Stevens in 1801 before Sparkler departed for the Baltic.

Sparkler joined Admiral Hyde Parker's North Sea Fleet at Yarmouth to take part in the expedition to the Baltic, which had as its objective to compel the Danes to abandon the League of Armed Neutrality. In March Cruizer sailed with Parker's fleet from Yarmouth roads for Copenhagen. Sparkler's crew received head money for the engagement at Copenhagen on 2 April. she did not actually participate in the battle and so her crew was not listed among those qualifying for the clasp "Copenhagen" to Naval General Service Medal.

=== Disposal ===
Following the Treaty of Amiens, the "Principal Officers and Commissioners of His Majesty's Navy" offered the "Sparkler Gun-Vessel, 160 Tons, Copper-bottomed", lying at Sheerness, for sale on 9 September 1802. She sold then.

== Merchantman ==
Sparkler then became a merchantman. She was raised in 1803 and given a new top and sides of fir plank.

She first appeared in the online copies of the registers in the 1804 volume of the Register of Shipping (RS). She first appeared in Lloyd's Register (LR) in the volume for 1805.

Year	Master	Owner	Trade	Source & notes
1804	J.C.Hable	Captain & Co.	London coaster	RS
1805	C.Brown	Captain & Co.	Dublin–Norway	LR; raised 1803 and new tops and sides of fir plank
1810	C.Brown	Captain & Co.	Dublin–Norway; Plymouth–St Johns	LR; raised 1803 and new tops and sides of fir plank

On 3 December 1812 the French privateer Augusta, of 14 guns and 120 men, from Saint-Malo, captured several British merchantmen near Scilly. One of the captured vessels was Sparkler, Brown, master, which had been sailing from Cadiz to London. Auguste put Sparkler's crew, as well as that of two other merchantmen, aboard Mary, which Auguste then released. Mary arrived at Plymouth on 30 December.

On 23 December HMS Armide and the hired armed cutter Nimrod were in company when they recaptured the English brig Sparkler, A. Brown, master. Nimrod sent Sparkler into Portland Roads.

Having been captured and recaptured, Sparkler apparently changed masters, and perhaps owner, a change that was not reflected in Lloyd's Register. The next mention of Sparkler was that on 11 July 1813 she had arrived at Gravesend from Memel, with Kieth, master.

== Loss ==
In February 1814 the transport Sparkler, Keith, master, was driven ashore and wrecked at Bayonne. The French took the crew prisoner.
