= Regius Professor of Rhetoric and English Literature =

Endowed chair at the University of Edinburgh

The Regius Chair of Rhetoric and English Literature at the University of Edinburgh was established in 1762 (as the Regius Chair of Rhetoric and Belles Lettres). It is arguably the first professorship of English Literature established anywhere in the world. Its first holder was Professor Hugh Blair.

== List of Regius Professors of Rhetoric and English Literature ==
- Hugh Blair (1762 to 1784)
- William Greenfield (1784 to 1798)
- Hugh Blair (reversion, 1798 to 1801)
- Andrew Brown (1801 to 1834)
- George Moir (1835 to 1840)
- William Spalding (1840 to 1845)
- William Edmonstoune Aytoun (1845 to 1865)
- David Mather Masson (1865 to 1895)
- George Saintsbury (1895 to 1915)
- Herbert John Clifford Grierson (1915 to 1935)
- John Dover Wilson (1935 to 1945)
- William Lindsay Renwick (1945 to 1959)
- John Everett Butt (1959 to 1965)
- Harold Jenkins (1966 to 1971)
- Alastair David Shaw Fowler (1971 to 1984)
- Vacant (1984 to 1990)
- Charles Ian Edward Donaldson (1990 to 1995)
- John Anthony Frow (2000 to 2004)
- Vacant (2004 to 2007)
- Laura Marcus (2007 to 2009)
- Greg Walker (2010 to present); incumbent

== See also ==
- Regius Professor
- University of Edinburgh School of Literatures, Languages and Cultures
