= HMS Foxhound (1809) =

Rfrench merchantman (1809), Royal Navy brig (1809–1816), and whaler (1816–1848)

History

France
- Name: Basque
- Ordered: 5 May 1808
- Builder: Jean Baudry, Bayonne
- Laid down: 8 June 1808
- Launched: 13 February 1809
- Captured: 12 November 1809

United Kingdom
- Name: HMS Foxhound
- Acquired: 1809 by capture
- Commissioned: July 1810
- Fate: Sold 1816

United Kingdom
- Name: Foxhound
- Owner: Birnie & Co.; Wilson & Co.
- Acquired: 1816 by purchase
- Fate: No longer listed in Lloyd's Register after 1848

General characteristics
- Type: Curieux-class brig, or possibly Sylphe-class brig
- Displacement: 158/290 tons (unladen/laden; French)
- Tons burthen: 34766/94 (bm)
- Length: 95 ft 6 in (29.1 m) (overall); 78 ft 0 3/4 in (23.8 m)
- Beam: 28 ft 11 1/4 in (8.8 m)
- Depth of hold: 8 ft 1 in (2.5 m)
- Propulsion: Sail
- Complement: French: 94 (112 at capture); HMS: 106
- Armament: French:14 × 24-pounder carronades + 2 × 8-pounder guns; HMS:14 × 24-pounder carronades + 2 × 9-pounder guns

HMS Foxhound was the French Navy's brig Basque, launched in 1809, that the British Royal Navy captured in 1809 and took into service as a 16-gun sloop. She had a relatively brief naval career in which she captured a number of merchant vessels. After the Navy sold her in 1816, she made some 10 or 11 whaling voyages between 1817 and 1848.

== French career and capture ==
Basque was a Curieux-class (or possibly Sylphe-class) brig. From 26 March 1809 she was under the command of lieutenant de vaisseau Maillard-Liscourt, and stationed in the Gulf of Gascony.

On 11 November 1809, HMS Druid, Captain Sir William Bolton, encountered Basque. Basque was able to fend-off an attack by Druid's boats, but two days later, on 13 November, Druid succeeded in capturing Basque. Basque was armed with 16 guns and had a crew of 112 men. She was sailing from Bayonne to Guadeloupe with a cargo of flour and other stores.

Basque was on her maiden voyage, and in company with her sister-ship Béarnais. The Royal Navy took Basque into service as HMS Foxhound. HMS Melampus captured Béarnais about a month later, off Guadeloupe. The Royal Navy took Béarnais into service as Curieux.

== Royal Navy service ==
Foxhound spent almost a year (28 November 1809 to 16 October 1810) at Plymouth undergoing repair. Commander Malcolm Cowan commissioned her in July 1810.

In 1810 Commander John Parrish replaced Cowan as Foxhound served in the English Channel. Parrish was captain on 19 December when she recaptured Nostra Senora del Carmen. The French privateer Dart, of 14 guns and 100 men, had captured Nostra Senora del Carmen, Seleido, master, on the 19th as she was sailing from London to Lisbon. Foxhound sent her into Plymouth, where she ran ashore with two feet of water in her hold.

A year later, Foxhound recaptured the brig Samuel on 2 December 1811. Samuel, Newsom, master, had been sailing from Lisbon to London when a French privateer had captured her on 30 November.

Foxhound towed into Plymouth on 11 January the whaler Ceres, Greenway, master. She had been returning to London from the South Seas when Foxhound found her dismasted and in distress off the coast of France.

On 24 December 1812, Foxhound recaptured Harmony, and the next day Catherine. The French privateer Augusta had captured both. Catherine, Blyth, master, had been sailing from Suriname to London, and Harmony, Gallop, master, had been sailing from Newfoundland to Poole. The recaptured vessels arrived at Plymouth on 1 and 2 January 1813. Augusta had captured another merchantmen that Favorite had recaptured.

Foxhound captured two American vessels: schooner Terrible on 8 February, and brig Weazle on 25 March. Terrible, of 200 tons (bm) and 13 men, had been sailing from New York to Bordeaux with a cargo of cotton and potash. Terrible arrived at Plymouth on 12 February. Weazle arrived at Plymouth on 1 April.

On 27 November Foxhound captured Sophia. (Note: A first-class share of the prize money was worth £531 2s 2d; a sixth-class share, that of an ordinary seaman, was worth £13 12s 6d.) Sophia was a Prussian ship sailing from Bordeaux; detained, she arrived at Plymouth on 6 December.

Towards the end of the year, on 18 December, Foxhound recaptured General Kempt and her cargo. General Kempt (or General Kemp), Jenkins, master, had been sailing from Quebec to Liverpool with a cargo of timber when the American privateer Grand Turk captured her. (Note: Grand Turk, of Salem, Massachusetts, was armed with 16 guns and had a crew of 105 men under the command of Captain N. Greene. She captured some 30 British merchantmen during her career as a privateer. Grand Turk had captured General Kempt on 22 November 1813. Captain Breed 17 members of General Kempt's crew of her, leaving only the carpenter and his wife. Captain Breed put a prize crew of 15 men aboard General Kempt, with Jonathan Symonds as prize master. He also put on board three Portuguese sailors who had been crew members on Wolfe's Cove, which he had captured four days earlier.) Weazle arrived at Plymouth on 1 April.

On 27 May 1814, Foxhound, still under Parrish's command, recaptured Margaret. (Note: A first-class share of the salvage was worth £43 12s 0d; a sixth-class share was worth £1 2s 0d.) The American privateer Surprise had captured Margaret as she was sailing to Britain from Lisbon. (Note: Surprise was a schooner out of Baltimore, of 10 guns and a crew of 120 men under the command of Captain Clement Cathell. She captured some 34 British vessels.)

Commander Thomas Warrand replaced Parrish in November 1814. Foxhound then transported half the 14th Regiment of Foot from Plymouth to Ostend. After the Battle of Waterloo, in June and early July 1815 Foxhound joined with Erebus to convoy transports between Deal and Ramsgate, and Ostend, and back. The transports brought back some 8,000 French prisoners. Foxhound was then employed in secret services off Calais, and "in other ways".

On 22 August Foxhound left deal for Sheerness, to be paid off. Warrand paid her off in September.

=== Disposal ===
The Principal Officers and Commissioners of His Majesty's Navy offered the "Foxhound brig, of 348 tons", lying at Sheerness, for sale on 23 November 1815. The Navy sold Foxhound on 15 February 1816 for £800.

== Whaler ==
Foxhound proceeded to make ten or 11 whaling voyages between 1817 and 1848. The first eight were for Birnie & Co. and the last two or three were for Wilson & Co.

1st whaling voyage (1817–1819): Captain Watson (or Walker) left Britain on 12 June 1817 bound for New South Wales and the whaler fishery. Foxhound was reported to have been there on 19 October 1817. She returned to Britain on 29 October 1819 with 460 casks of whale oil.

2nd whaling voyage (1820–1822): Captain Mattinson left Britain on 18 January 1820 for Timor. In December 1820 Foxhound was "all well" at Ambonya. She returned to Britain on 16 June 1822 with 500 casks of whale oil.

3rd whaling voyage (1822–1824): Captain Mattinson (or Maddison) left Britain on 7 September 1822, bound for Japanese waters. (At the time Japan itself was closed to Westerners.) Foxhound returned to Britain on 12 April 1824 with 480 casks, plus fins (baleen).

4th whaling voyage (1824–1827): Foxhound left Britain on 30 July 1824, this time with the Pacific Ocean as her destination. Initially Matheson was her master, but at some point S. Emmett replaced him. She was at Madeira on 8 August and on 9 January 1825 at Otaheite. She was at Honolulu on 13 June 1826 (with 400 barrels), Maui on 7 July, Tahiti on 24 August, Tahiti again on 6 November. From there she left for the seas off Japan. She was at Huahine on 29 November, and back at Tahiti between 6 and 8 December. She returned to Britain on 13 April 1827 with 550 casks.

5th whaling voyage (1827–1829): S. Emmett left Britain for the Pacific Ocean on 17 July 1827. Foxhound was at Tahiti in May 1828, at Honolulu on 20 November 1828 with 1900 barrels, and again at Tahiti in May 1829. She returned to Britain on 18 Oct 1829 with 1900 barrels "[incomplete]".

6th whaling voyage (1831–1833): S. Emmet her from Britain on 5 June 1830 for the Pacific Ocean. Foxhound was at Tahiti in March–April 1831. She was at Tahiti again and left on 24 March 1832 for the coast of Japan. She was at the Bay of Islands on 9 February 1833 with 1600 barrels, and Tahiti on 13 May 1833. She returned to Britain on 26 September 1833 with 1600 barrels "[incomplete]"

7th whaling voyage (1834–1837): Captain Grey, a new master, sailed Foxhound from Britain on 28 May 1834, bound for the seas off Japan. In April 1835 she was at Guam, with 600 barrels. On 15 August she was again at Guam, but with 1600 barrels. She returned to Britain on 24 August 1837 with "1800 barrels [full]".

8th whaling voyage (1838–1841): Captain Charles Stewart Blake (or Black) sailed Foxhound from Britain on 12 January 1838, bound for Timor. she reached Brava, Cape Verde, on 24 February and Timor by 14 December. She was at the Cocos Isles on 17 June 1839. By January 1840 she was in the Gilolo Passage with 500 barrels. Five months later she had 750 barrels. She was at Ampanam on 20 November. By 6 March 1840 she had 1000 barrels. She was at St Helena on 2 November 1840 with 1100 barrels. She returned to Britain on 3 January 1841 with 1100 barrels "[incomplete]".

On her return creditors seized her. Birnie had mortgaged Foxhound and her cargo against a debt that he was unable to discharge.

9th whaling voyage (1841–1844): Foxhound had new owners, Wilson & Co. Captain Francis Simmons (or Simmonds) left Britain on 20 May 1841, bound for the Seychelles. She was reported at Johanna on 7 August 1841, and at St Augustine's Bay three weeks later. She was again at Johanna on 31 July 1842. She returned to Britain on 1 February 1844 with 440 casks + 4 tanks.

Foxhound underwent a large repair in 1844.

10th whaling voyage (1844–1847): Captain Rains left Britain on 27 April 1844. Foxhound was reported at Mauritius on 15 June 1845 with 400 barrels. On 26 December she was at Cochin and shortly thereafter near Ceylon. She returned to Britain on 22 September 1847.

== Fate ==
An eleventh whaling voyage, with Rains, master, was planned or commenced on 1 May 1849, but there is no other data. In fact, Lloyd's Register of British and foreign shipping for 1849 no longer lists Foxhound. It is currently unclear whether she began a voyage that had to be aborted, was lost, or simply was broken up.
