= School of Literatures, Languages and Cultures, University of Edinburgh =

Department of the University of Edinburgh

Coordinates: 55°56′38″N 3°11′13″W

The School of Literatures, Languages and Cultures is a department within the College of Arts, Humanities and Social Sciences at the University of Edinburgh in Scotland.

The unit was formed in 2002 as a result of administrative restructuring, when several departments of what was then the Faculty of Arts were brought together.

The School currently covers seven major subject areas:

- Asian Studies (Chinese, Japanese and Sanskrit)
- Celtic and Scottish Studies (Scottish Gaelic: Ceiltis agus Eòlas na h-Alba)
- English Literature
- European Languages and Cultures (French, German, Hispanic Studies, Italian, Russian and Scandinavian Studies)
- Film and Intermediality
- Islamic studies and Middle Eastern Studies
- Translation Studies

Founded in 1762 when King George III appointed the Reverend Hugh Blair as the first Regius Professor of Rhetoric and Belles-Lettres, the English Literature department is the oldest centre for the study of Literature in the UK, and one of the oldest in the world.

The college also includes a sizeable Graduate School which includes Masters and PhDs in Film Studies, Theatre Studies, Translation Studies, Cultural Studies and other subjects. The School also supports interdisciplinary research areas such as Word and Music Studies.
