= Mark Kinkead-Weekes =

South African literary scholar (1931–2011)

Mark Kinkead-Weekes FBA (26 April 1931 – 7 March 2011) was a South African literary scholar. From 1974 to 1984, he was professor of English and American literature at the University of Kent, where he had been an academic since 1965. He had previously taught at the University of Edinburgh from 1956 to 1965. He was elected a fellow of the British Academy in 1992.

== Publications ==
- (with Ian Gregor) William Golding: A Critical Study (London: Faber and Faber, 1967; 2nd edn, 1984; 3rd edn, 2002)
- Samuel Richardson: Dramatic Novelist (London: Methuen, 1973)
- (Editor) Twentieth-Century Interpretations of The Rainbow: A Collection of Critical Essays (Hoboken, NJ: Prentice Hall, 1971)
- (Editor) D. H. Lawrence, The Rainbow, The Cambridge Edition of the Works of D. H. Lawrence (Cambridge: Cambridge University Press, 1989)
- D. H. Lawrence: Triumph to Exile, 1912–1922 (Cambridge: Cambridge University Press, 1996)
