= HMS Onslaught =

Several ships of the Royal Navy have been named HMS Onslaught:

- HMS Onslaught (1915), an Admiralty M-class destroyer launched in 1915 and sold for scrap in 1921.
- HMS Onslaught (G04), an O-class destroyer launched in 1941. In 1951 she was sold to Pakistan and renamed Tughril. She was scrapped in 1977.
- HMS Onslaught (S14), an Oberon-class submarine, launched in 1961 and served until 1990.
