= HMS Grenville =

Four Royal Navy ships have been named HMS Grenville. Vice Admiral Sir Richard Grenville was an Elizabethan sailor, explorer, and soldier:

- HMS Grenville (1763), a 12-gun schooner of 69 tons purchased in Newfoundland on 7 June 1763, having formerly been called Sally, and used as a survey vessel. Broken up in March 1775.
- HMS Grenville (1916), a destroyer leader launched on 17 June 1916 and sold in December 1931.
- HMS Grenville (H03), a G-class destroyer leader launched on 15 August 1935 and sunk 19 January 1940.
- HMS Grenville (R97), a U-class destroyer, launched 12 October 1942, and disposed of in 1983.

The Royal Canadian Navy also operated a fishery protection vessel, HMCS Grenville, launched in Toronto in 1915.
