= John Frow =

Australian academic (born 1948)

- Born: John Frow; 13 November 1948 (age 77); Coonabarabran, New South Wales, Australia
- Education: The Australian National University, Cornell University
- Occupations: Professor, author
- Style: Literary poetry, twentieth-century poetry, cultural studies, poststructuralist theory, sociology of literature, actor-network theory, intellectual property law

John Frow (born 13 November 1948 in Coonabarabran, Australia) is an Australian writer of literary theory, narrative theory, intellectual property law, and cultural studies. He is Professor Emeritus of English at the University of Sydney.

== Career ==
As a professor, Frow specializes in teaching humanities and social sciences, possessing a broad skillset ranging from technical work in literary theory and discourse analysis to empirical- and statistically-based sociology.

His doctoral work and first book, Marxism and Literary History (1986), reworks Marxist theory for a non-determinist account of literary systems. Drawing inspiration from the works of Althusser and Foucault, Frow seamlessly merges his knowledge of Russian Formalist theory and German reception aesthetics, resulting in a critical and meaningful engagement with post-structuralist theory and a broad range of literary texts. It theorized the relation between discourse and power, the relational structure of literary texts and systems, and the dynamics of literary change.

Frow later worked on the framework elaborated in this book, although he has subsequently moved away from a commitment to Marxism towards a more Foucauldian understanding of social and discursive power. Cultural Studies and Cultural Value (1995) undertook a critique of the hierarchy of value that sorts 'high' and 'low' culture into distinct domains, arguing that the field of culture now has multiple centres and multiple domains of value which are irreducible to a single scale.

The book formulated an account of the 'knowledge class' of information workers and argued that it has specific interests in the field of culture. The central essay of Time and Commodity Culture (1997) theorized the distinction and the inter-dependence of gift and commodity economies as a way of analyzing the encroachment of the commodity form on the commons in information; other essays in the book explored the temporality of capital as the basis for historical understanding and the technologies of memory.

== Books ==
Frow's most recent books have focused on questions of literary theory and its relation to cultural studies. Genre (2006; second revised edition 2015) explores the work of generic classification across a range of literary and cultural texts, understanding genres not as fixed frameworks but as dynamic processes of organization of social knowledge.

The Practice of Value (2013) is a collection of essays on the relationship between literary and cultural studies. Character and Person (2014) explores the nature of human personhood by setting models of the person with models of fictional characters several distinct literary and cinematic systems. The book argues both for the specificity of the person and fictional character, and for how each of them depends upon and informs our understanding of the other.

== Education ==
Frow completed his early education at Wagga High School and higher education at Australian National University. After working and traveling for two years in Buenos Aires and South America he undertook graduate studies in the Comparative Literature Department at Cornell University (including a year as an exchange student at the University of Heidelberg). He received his PhD in 1977.

== Academic positions ==
After holding teaching positions at Knox College, Sydney, in 1969, the Universidad del Salvador in Buenos Aires in 1970, and Cornell University in 1974–75, Frow's first full-time academic position was at the newly created Murdoch University in Western Australia, where he worked from 1975 to 1988.

He taught in the Comparative Literature Department at the University of Minnesota in 1988, and in 1989 took up a chair in the English Department at the University of Queensland. He moved to the University of Edinburgh as the Regius Professor of Rhetoric and English Literature in 2000, where he was also the director of the Institute for Advanced Studies in the Humanities. In 2004 he returned to Australia, taking up the chair of English Language and Literature at the University of Melbourne. He moved to his current position at the University of Sydney in 2013.

Frow has held visiting fellowships at Wesleyan University, the University of Chicago, New York University, and Goldsmiths College, University of London. He is a Fellow of the Australian Academy of the Humanities.

== Editorial positions ==
He has been a consulting editor for Social Semiotics, a member of the board of m/c: A Journal of Media and Culture, and was the Australian Reviews Editor for Cultural Studies from 1987 to 1996. He is the Senior Editor for Literary Theory in the Oxford Research Encyclopedia of Literature.

== Publications ==
Frow is the author of seven major monographs and two co-edited collections, in addition to some smaller monographs and over a hundred book chapters and refereed journal articles. His work has been widely reprinted and has been translated into many languages including Chinese, Persian, Japanese, French, and Portuguese.

== Monographs ==
- Marxism and Literary History was published by Harvard University Press and Basil Blackwell in 1986, with a second edition in 1988.
- Cultural Studies and Cultural Value was published by the Clarendon Press in 1995.
- Time and Commodity Culture was published, again by the Clarendon Press, in 1997.
- Accounting for Tastes: Australian Everyday Cultures (co-authored with Tony Bennett and Michael Emmison) was published by Cambridge University Press in 1999.
- Genre was published by Routledge in its New Critical Idiom series in 2006, with a second revised edition in 2015.
- The Practice of Value was published by the University of Western Australia Press in 2013.
- Character and Person was published by Oxford University Press in 2014.

== Edited collections ==
- Australian Cultural Studies: A Reader, edited with Meaghan Morris, was published by Allen and Unwin and the University of Illinois Press in 1993.
- The SAGE Handbook of Cultural Analysis, edited with Tony Bennett, was published by Sage in 2008.
