= William Lindsay Renwick =

Scottish professor

- Born: 6 January 1889; Glasgow
- Died: 25 November 1970 (aged 81); Edinburgh
- Occupation: Regis Professor of English Literature
- Spouse: Margaret Lang

Academic work
- Discipline: English Literature
- Notable works: Edmund Spenser: An Essay on Renaissance Poetry

William Lindsay Renwick (6 January 1889 – 25 November 1970) was professor of English literature at Durham University from 1921 to 1945 and Regius Professor of Rhetoric and English Literature at the University of Edinburgh from 1945 to 1959.

== Early life and education ==
Renwick was born at 32 Kelvin Drive, Glasgow, on 6 January 1889, the youngest of five children of Jane Renwick (née Lindsay), a teacher of English, and William Kirkwood Renwick, a mercantile clerk.

Raised in the family home at 12 Arlington Street, Glasgow, he was educated at the local Woodside School. Although, Renwick always maintained strong links with Glasgow, he had a strong affinity to the Borders where his paternal grandfather was a shepherd near Garvald. In October 1907, he enrolled at the University of Glasgow and graduated with an ordinary MA degree on 10 June 1910 having taken classes in mathematics, logic, and moral philosophy.

His contemporaries at University were Walter Elliot, John Boyd and George Buchanan Smith. He was active in Union discussions, contributed to debates, and in literary societies such as the Mermaid Club. He was also subeditor of the University Magazine 1909-1910 and some of his contributions appear in two anthologies of the University of Glasgow verse.

In the 1910/11 session, he took classes in English and History, graduating with first class honours in English. In 1912, he was awarded the George A. Clark Scholarship which allowed him to study French and Italian at the Sorbonne, Toulouse and the British School in Rome.

== First World War ==
With the outbreak of World War I, Renwick joined the tenth battalion of the Cameronians (The Royal Scottish Rifles) on 27 September 1914. He experienced trench warfare with this regiment and rose quickly in the ranks to become a Captain, serving at home and in France where his battalion took part in the Battle of Loos. After experiencing this particularly devastating attack, according to his entry on the University of Glasgow’s Roll of Honour, he felt ‘like a ghost, an old ghost, sceptical and disillusioned.’"

Six months later, he was invalided and sent home for hospital treatment. Thereafter, he undertook instructional duties.

On 11 October 1917, Renwick married his fellow University of Glasgow graduate, Margaret Lang, at Eastwood Parish Church. Margaret’s brother, Arthur Lang, another Glasgow honours graduate, was killed in action in August 1916.

== Interwar years ==
Renwick returned to civilian life in 1919 and went up to Merton College, Oxford; the following year he was awarded a B.Litt degree for his thesis on the renaissance poet, Edmund Spenser.

He then returned to Glasgow where he lectured for a short spell at the University of Glasgow; residing at 32 Keir Street, Pollokshields. It was during this period of 1920-21, that he enrolled for one year in evening classes at Glasgow School of Art to learn bookbinding. Following this, William moved to Newcastle-upon-Tyne to become Professor of English Literature at Durham University in 1921. In April 1926, he was awarded a DLitt by the University of Glasgow for his thesis, Edmond Spenser : an essay on Renaissance poetry, and received an honorary doctorate by the University of Bordeaux in 1934.

He remained Professor of English Language and Literature at King's College, Durham University, for 24 years from 1921 to 1945.

== World War Two and later life ==
Upon the outbreak of the Second World War, William joined the Home Guard, where he was made a commander. He also spent a year in China as a visiting professor, lecturing with the British Council on a tour of Chinese Universities offering support to academic staff from 1943-1944.

Following the end of the war in 1945, William was appointed Regis Professor of Rhetoric and English Literature at the University of Edinburgh. Moving to a new home in Edinburgh overlooking Arthur’s Seat, he was to remain in this role until he retired in 1959. The sub-department of English for Foreign Students was established in this period and he was also involved in the setting up of the School of Scottish Studies in 1951. In 1953, Renwick was awarded the honorary degree of Doctor of Law by the University of Glasgow.

He died on 25 November 1970, aged 81, in an Edinburgh hospital.

The Renwicks left 26 works of art to the University of Glasgow in 1986/7 through the bequest of William's wife, Margaret, in 1985. The collection highlights in particular the Scottish artists of the twentieth century.

Professor William Lindsay Renwick is commemorated on the Glasgow School of Art’s First World War Roll of Honour.

== Selected publications ==
- Edmund Spenser, An Essay in Renaissance Poetry (1925)
- Edmund Spenser's Complaints (1928)
- Spenser's Works (1928)
- Daphaida and other Poems (1929)
- The Shepherd's Calendar (1930)
- (as editor) Edmund Spenser, A View of the Present State of Ireland (1934).
- John of Bordeaux (1936)
- The Beginnings of English Literature (1939)
- The Faerie Queene (1947)
- English Literature 1789-1815, a contribution to the Oxford History of English Literature (1963)
- Kipling's Mind and Art (1964)
- (as editor) John Moore, Mordaunt: Sketches of Life, Characters and Manners in Various Countries (1965)
