= HMS Foxhound =

Six ships of the Royal Navy have been named HMS Foxhound. A seventh was planned but never completed:

- HMS Foxhound (1806) was an 18-gun Cruizer-class brig-sloop launched in 1806. She foundered in 1809 in the Atlantic.
- HMS Foxhound (1809) was a 16-gun sloop, originally the French Navy's brig Basque. She was captured in 1809 and sold in 1816. She then became a whaler, making some 10-11 whaling voyages between 1817 and 1848.
- HMS Foxhound was to have been a 10-gun Cherokee-class brig-sloop. She was ordered in 1826 but cancelled in 1831.
- HMS Foxhound (1856) was a screw gunboat launched in 1856 and broken up in 1866.
- HMS Foxhound (1877) was a 4-gun screw gunboat launched in 1877. She was transferred to the Coastguard in 1886, became a coal yug and was renamed YC 20 in 1897, was sold in 1920 and finally broken up in 1975.
- HMS Foxhound (1909) was a Beagle-class destroyer launched in 1909 and sold in 1921.
- HMS Foxhound (H69) was an F-class destroyer launched in 1934, transferred to the Royal Canadian Navy in 1944 and renamed HMCS Qu'appelle, and sold in 1948.
