= Greg Walker (academic) =

Greg Walker FRSE is Regius Professor of Rhetoric and English Literature at the University of Edinburgh. He is a graduate of the University of Southampton. His specialist field is the history of literature and drama in the late-medieval period and the sixteenth century. Before taking up the Regius Chair he was the Masson Professor of English at Edinburgh. Before that he was Professor of Early-Modern Literature and Culture and Director of the Medieval Research Centre at the University of Leicester. Between 1986 and 1989 he was a British Academy Postdoctoral Research Fellow at Southampton and has also taught at the Universities of Queensland and Buckingham. He was the Head of Edinburgh's School of Literatures, Languages and Cultures between 2008 and 2011.

In 2022, he was elected a member of the Academia Europaea.

== Published books ==
- John Heywood: comedy and survival in Tudor England (2020)
- Reading literature historically: drama and poetry from Chaucer to the Reformation (2013)
- Writing under tyranny: English literature and the Henrician Reformation (2005)
- The private life of Henry VIII (2003)
- The politics of performance in early Renaissance drama (1998)
- Persuasive fictions: faction, faith, and political culture in the reign of Henry VIII (1996)
- Plays of persuasion: drama and politics at the court of Henry VIII (1991)
- John Skelton and the politics of the 1520s (1988)

Walker is a Fellow of the Royal Historical Society, the English Association, the Society of Antiquaries of London, the Agder Academy of Arts and Sciences (Norway), and the Royal Society of Edinburgh, and an elected member of Academia Europaea. He was a member of the AHRC Council and chaired its Advisory Board or ten years from 2010 to 2020.

He is a former Chair of the Council for College and University English (what is now University English) and a member of the RAE subpanel for 2008 and the ‘Impact’ pilot panel in 2010, and was Deputy Chair of the English Language and Literature sub-panel for REF 2014. He chaired the English Language and Literature sub-panel for REF 2021.

He is co-editor, with Elaine Treharne, of the Oxford Textual Perspectives monograph series (Oxford University Press), and he co-edited, with Martin Stannard, the series, Studies in European Cultural Transition (Ashgate).

Among his other roles are: Chair of the Judges for the James Tait Black Drama Prize; Dean of the Scottish Universities International Summer School; Member of the English Association Higher Education Committee and a Trustee of the English Association; Member of the Advisory Council of the Institute for English Studies, London; Member of the judging panel, The RHS Sir John Neale Essay Prize, 2015-2021.
