= HMS Magnificent =

Four ships of the Royal Navy have been named HMS Magnificent.

- HMS Magnificent (1766) was a 74-gun third rate launched in 1766 and wrecked in 1804.
- HMS Magnificent (1806) was a 74-gun third rate launched in 1806. She was used as a hospital ship from 1825 and was sold in 1843.
- HMS Magnificent (1894) was a Majestic-class battleship launched in 1894. She was used as a storeship from 1918 and was sold in 1921.
- HMS Magnificent was a Majestic-class aircraft carrier launched in 1944, loaned to the Royal Canadian Navy upon completion in 1948, returned in 1957, and scrapped in 1965.
