= HMS Champion =

Five ships of the Royal Navy have borne the name HMS Champion:

- HMS Champion (1779) was a 24-gun sixth rate launched in 1779. She was reassigned to harbour service in 1810 and sold in 1816.
- HMS Champion (1824) was an 18-gun sloop launched in 1824. She was reassigned to harbour service in 1859 and broken up in 1867 after being wrecked as a target.
- HMS Champion (1878) was a screw corvette launched in 1878. She was reassigned to harbour service in 1904 and was renamed Champion (old) in 1915 to free the name for the next Champion under construction. She was sold in 1919.
- HMS Champion (1915) was a C-class light cruiser launched in 1915. She served during the First World War and was present at the Battle of Jutland, before being sold in 1934.
- HMS Champion was a planned C-class destroyer, but was renamed HMS Chequers prior to her launch in 1944.
