= John Everett Butt =

English literary scholar (1906–1965)

Butt in 1961.

John Everett Butt, FBA (12 April 1906 – 22 November 1965) was an English literary scholar, known for his work on Alexander Pope. He was Regius Professor of Rhetoric and English Literature at the University of Edinburgh from 1959 to 1965.

== Biography ==
He was born at Hoole, the son of a medical man Francis John Butt and his wife Charlotte Barrell Dutton, sister of Joseph Everett Dutton. He attended Shrewsbury School and Merton College, Oxford, switching from medicine to English language and literature and graduating in 1928.

Butt was employed as an assistant lecturer at the University of Leeds in 1929 and then briefly as an assistant librarian at the University of Oxford in 1930, before being appointed in that year to a lectureship in English at Bedford College, London. He remained there until 1946, though his tenure was interrupted by temporary appointments at the Ministry of Home Security and the Home Office during the Second World War. In 1946, he was elected Professor of English Language and Literature at King's College, Newcastle, then part of Durham University. He remained there until taking up the Regius Professorship of Rhetoric and English Literature at the University of Edinburgh in 1959, in which post he remained until his death in 1965 at the age of 59.

Butt's contributions to academia began with his first published article on Alexander Pope in 1928. Four years later, he was appointed general editor of Methuen's Twickenham edition of the Works of Alexander Pope, an 11-volume series published between 1939 and 1969. A condensed version was edited by Butt himself as The Poems of Alexander Pope (1963) and he edited other versions of An Epistle to Dr Arbuthnot and Imitations of Horace. He also translated some of Voltaire's works, and authored Augustans and Romantics, 1689–1830 (1940), The Augustan Age (1950), and Dickens at Work (1957). With Kathleen Tillotson, he was from 1958 editor of the Clarendon Press's Dickens series and was an influence on The Letters of Charles Dickens project which began in the year of his death. He had been undertaking work on the mid-18th-century volume of The Oxford History of English Literature, which was continued by Geoffrey Carnall. He was editor of The Review of English Studies (1947–54) and gave the British Academy's Warton Lecture in 1954; he was elected a fellow of the academy in 1961 and was the subject of a posthumous Festschrift, published in 1969.
