= HMS Druid =

Six ships of the Royal Navy have borne the name HMS Druid, after the Druids of Celtic polytheism, whilst another was planned:

- HMS Druid (1761) was a 10-gun sloop launched in 1761 and sunk as a breakwater in 1773.
- HMS Druid (1776) was a 16-gun sloop, formerly in civilian service under the name Brilliant. She was purchased in 1776, converted into a fire ship and renamed HMS Blast in 1779, and was finally sold in 1783.
- HMS Druid (1783) was a 32-gun fifth rate launched in 1783, converted into a troopship in 1798 and broken up in 1813.
- HMS Druid (1825) was a 46-gun fifth rate launched in 1825 and sold in 1863.
- HMS Druid (1869) was a wooden screw corvette launched in 1869 and sold in 1886.
- HMS Druid (1911) was an Acheron-class destroyer launched in 1911 and sold in 1921.
- HMS Druid was to have been a Daring-class destroyer but she was renamed HMS Diana in 1946 before being launched in 1952.
