= Dunhampstead railway station =

Disused railway station in Dunhampstead, Worcestershire

Dunhampstead

General information
- Location: Dunhampstead, Worcestershire; England
- Coordinates: 52.23°N 2.1067°W
- Grid reference: SO928590

Other information
- Status: Disused

History
- Original company: Birmingham and Gloucester Railway
- Pre-grouping: Midland Railway

Key dates
- November 1841: Opened
- 1 October 1855: Closed
Location

Dunhampstead railway station served the village of Dunhampstead, Worcestershire, England, from 1841 to 1855 on the Birmingham and Gloucester Railway.

== History ==
The station was opened in November 1841 by the Birmingham and Gloucester Railway. It closed on 1 October 1855.

Preceding station	Disused railways	Following station
Oddingley	Birmingham and Gloucester Railway	Droitwich Spa
