= British Rail Class 35 =

Class of diesel-hydraulic locomotives

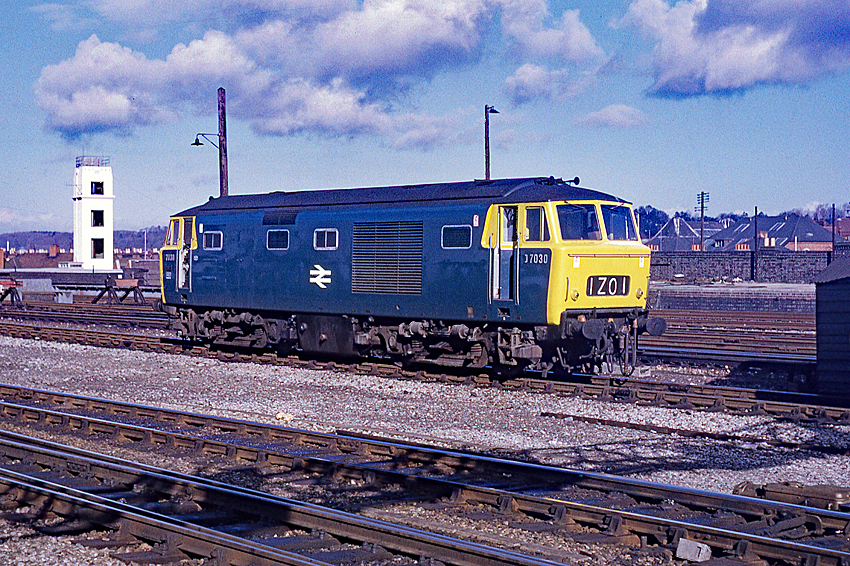
- D7030 at Reading in 1971
Type and origin
- Power type: Diesel-hydraulic
- Builder: Beyer Peacock (Hymek) Ltd
- Serial number: 7894–7938, 7949–8004
- Build date: 1961–1964
- Total produced: 101
Specifications
- Configuration
  - UIC: B'B'
  - Commonwealth: B-B
- Gauge: 4 ft 8 1/2 in (1,435 mm) standard gauge
- Wheel diameter: 3 ft 9 in (1.143 m)
- Wheelbase: 36 ft 0 in (10.97 m)
- Length: 51 ft 8 1/2 in (15.761 m)
- Width: 8 ft 10 in (2.69 m)
- Height: 12 ft 10 in (3.91 m)
- Loco weight: 75 long tons (76.2 t; 84.0 short tons)
- Fuel capacity: 800 imp gal (3,600 L; 960 US gal)
- Prime mover: Bristol-Siddeley / Maybach MD870
- Engine type: V16 Diesel
- Displacement: 86 L (5,200 cu in)
- Cylinders: 16
- Transmission: Hydraulic, Stone-Maybach Mekydro type K184U
- MU working: Yellow Triangle
- Train heating: Steam
- Train brakes: Vacuum
Performance figures
- Maximum speed: 90 mph (145 km/h)
- Power output: Engine: 1,700 bhp (1,270 kW) at 1,500 rpm
- Tractive effort: Maximum: 46,600 lbf (207.3 kN); Continuous: 33,950 lbf (151.0 kN)@ 12.5 mph (20.1 km/h)
- Brakeforce: 57 long tons-force (568 kN)
Career
- Operators: British Rail
- Numbers: D7000–D7100
- Nicknames: Hymek
- Axle load class: Route availability 6
- Retired: 1971–1975
- Disposition: Four preserved, remainder scrapped

The British Rail Class 35 is a class of mixed-traffic B-B diesel locomotive with hydraulic transmission. Because of their Mekydro-design hydraulic transmission units, the locomotives became known as the Hymeks. They were numbered D7000-D7100.

The class was developed for the Western Region of British Railways, which had opted for lightweight locomotives with hydraulic transmission, when allocated funds under the British Railways Modernisation Plan of 1955. 101 of the class were built between 1961 and 1964, when it became apparent that there was a requirement for a medium-power diesel-hydraulic design for both secondary passenger work and freight duties.

They were allocated to Bristol Bath Road, Cardiff Canton, and Old Oak Common. None of the class was named. Withdrawal from service began in 1971, and was completed by 1975. Their early withdrawal was caused primarily by BR classifying the hydraulic transmission as non-standard.

== Development ==
The builder, Beyer Peacock (Hymek) Ltd, was a joint venture between Bristol Siddeley Engines (BSE) (licensed to build Maybach engines), Stone-Platt Industries (licensed to build Mekydro transmissions), and the locomotive manufacturer Beyer, Peacock and Company. At the time they were built, the Hymeks were the most powerful diesel-hydraulic locomotives operating with a single engine – the Maybach MD870. Unlike the higher-powered diesel-hydraulic Class 42 and Class 43 (Warship classes), and Western locomotives in the Western Region fleet (with dual Maybach MD655 engines), the Hymeks were not based on an existing West German design but one developed by the industrial design consultants, Wilkes and Ashmore.

== Operational service ==
Distribution of locomotives, July 1967
British Rail Class 35 is located in Southern England
Code	Name	Quantity
81A	Old Oak Common	23
82A	Bristol Bath Road	40
83A	Newton Abbot	1
84A	Laira	1
86A	Cardiff Canton	36
Total:		101

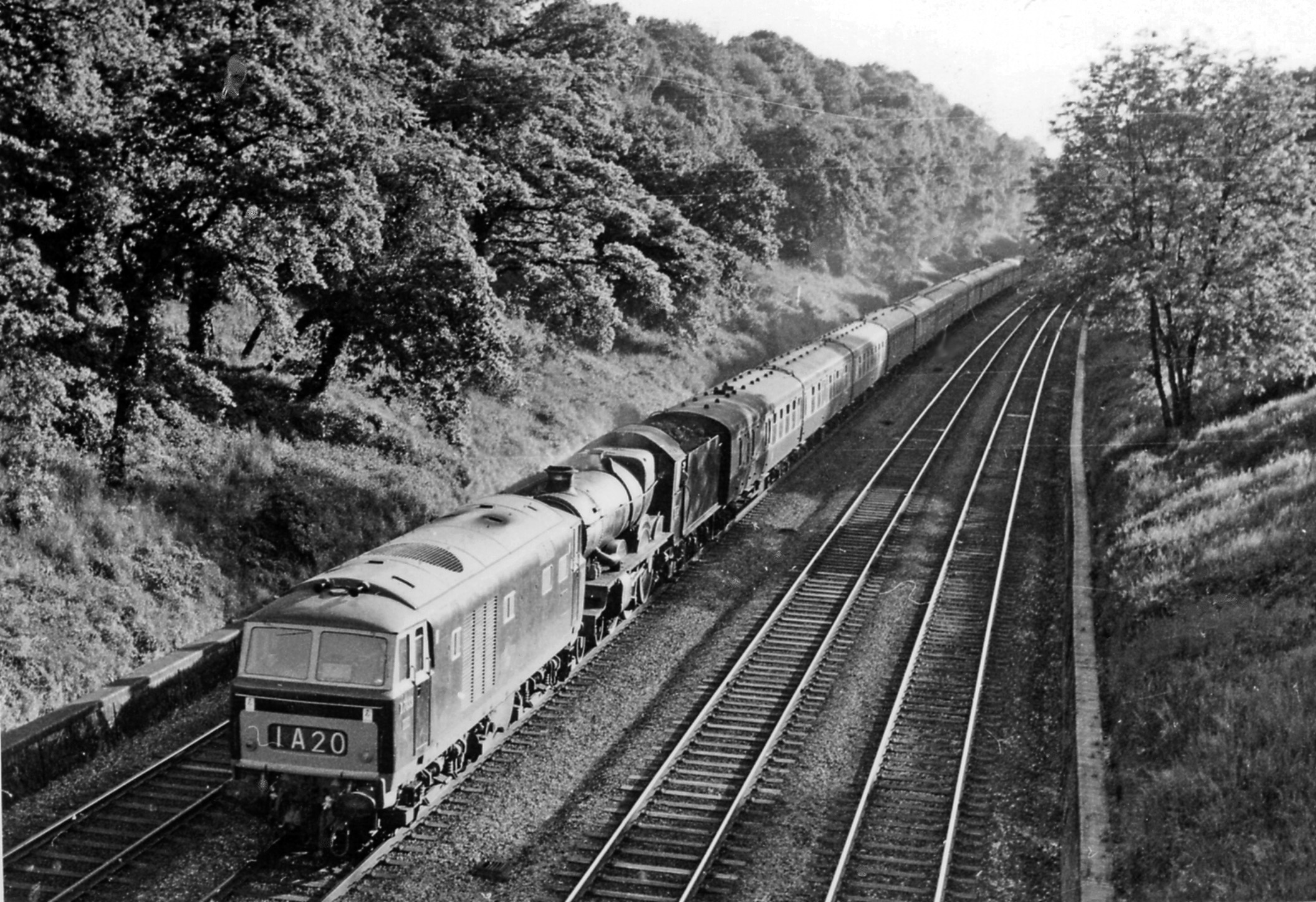
D7033 piloting 5013 Abergavenny Castle on a South Wales to London service in 1962

The original intention was for the Hymeks to replace steam locomotives in the Bristol area, west of Newton Abbot, and in South Wales, taking parcels and freight services within each area, and also passenger services to and from London. On introduction in 1961 the first locomotives were employed on secondary passenger services based around Bristol, such as Paddington to Hereford and semi-fast services to the west of England and Wales. Once they had proved themselves more than capable of handling these duties, they were also assigned to express Paddington-Cardiff-Swansea services, displacing King-class steam locomotives. These duties were heavier than they were designed for, and the Hymeks were displaced when Western and Brush type 4 locomotives became available to allow accelerated timings.

Hymeks also worked pickup freights throughout the Western Region as a mixed-traffic design and were used heavily on inter-regional passenger services. This latter often caused operational problems as they would often terminate in areas where there were no trained staff to handle the locomotive once the rostered crew had 'booked-off'. To avoid these instances, the locomotive would invariably be dispatched back to the nearest Western Region tracks without delay. The Hymeks were capable of operating in multiple, but only with each other. The electro-pneumatic control system (coded "Yellow Triangle") allowed only one trailing locomotive to be controlled (by one driver): some trains were operated by three locomotives (all at the front of the train), but in these cases only two locomotives were connected in multiple, the third having a separate driver.

Hymeks were used all over the Western Region on mixed traffic services from secondary passenger and parcels through express freight to ballast trains. They were common in all parts of the region from Paddington to Bristol/South Wales/Worcester/Hereford. They also worked to Birmingham and the West of England, but were rare west of Plymouth.

Hymeks were notably used as bankers on the Lickey Incline, propelling mainly freight trains from Bromsgrove to Blackwell. During trials, it was discovered that the Hymeks changed between first and second gear at about the speed required to bank a train up the incline, and so they tended to "hunt" between the two gears. Repeated gear changes under full power caused excessive wear and damage, plus excessive heat in the transmission fluid quickly resulted in the locomotive stopping. The simplest way to avoid excessive wear, and the stopping of a train on the incline, was to lock first gear out of action, via the master switch located in each locomotive's A-end cab. With all Lickey bankers allocated to Worcester shed, the main group of five locomotives (D7021 - D7025) and any replacements were all turned on the Worcester triangle, so that the A-cab was always aligned up the incline. Once at the bottom of the incline, each train which required banking would be signalled to the banking locomotives by Gloucester Panel Signal Box, so that the banking crew could then determine if it was necessary to lock out first gear on one or more of the locomotives. These banking operations commenced in 1969 and involved one, two or three locomotives with two locos set up to work in multiple plus an additional single locomotive (three in total) in operation on any given day. Particularly heavy trains such as the Llanwern to Immingham steel train required all three locomotives.

== Accidents and incidents ==
- On 13 July 1969, locomotive No. D7048 was involved in an accident at Spetchley, Worcestershire.
- On 15 December 1971, a Cardiff to Portsmouth Harbour train hauled by D7013 collided with Southern Region 4-CIG electrical multiple unit no. 7303 on the high level section of Portsmouth And Southsea station, Hampshire. Sixteen passengers and railway staff were injured. The accident report notes that "...the locomotive suffered a badly bent buffer and other cab-end damage as well as minor underframe distortion...". D7013 was withdrawn from service on 1 January 1972.

== Liveries ==
When first built, the Hymeks were given a more elaborate livery than many of the contemporary British Railways diesel classes. The main body of the locomotive was the standard dark Brunswick green, but with a lime green stripe along the bottom of the bodywork. The roof was medium grey, and the finishing touch was to paint the window surrounds in ivory white. In the early 1960s, yellow warning panels were added to the lower part of the front ends, in accordance with BR's then-new policy. With the advent of the Corporate Identity scheme in 1965 some locomotives received all-over BR Rail Blue with small yellow warning panels. This was quickly changed by the return of off-white window surrounds. The final variation was BR blue with full yellow ends, the yellow being extended around the cab side windows.

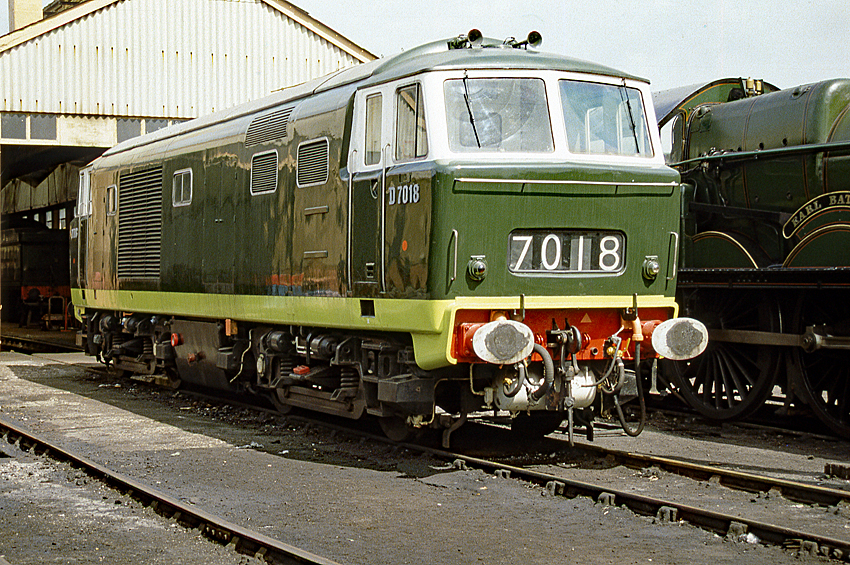
Green, no warning panel.

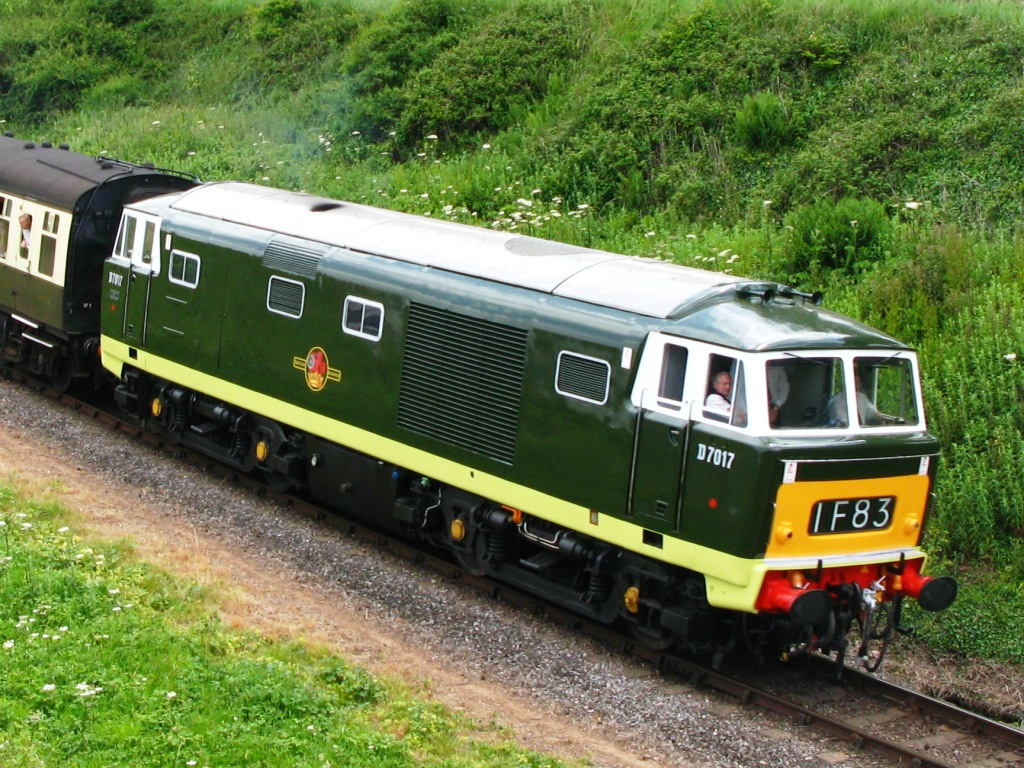
Green, small panel.

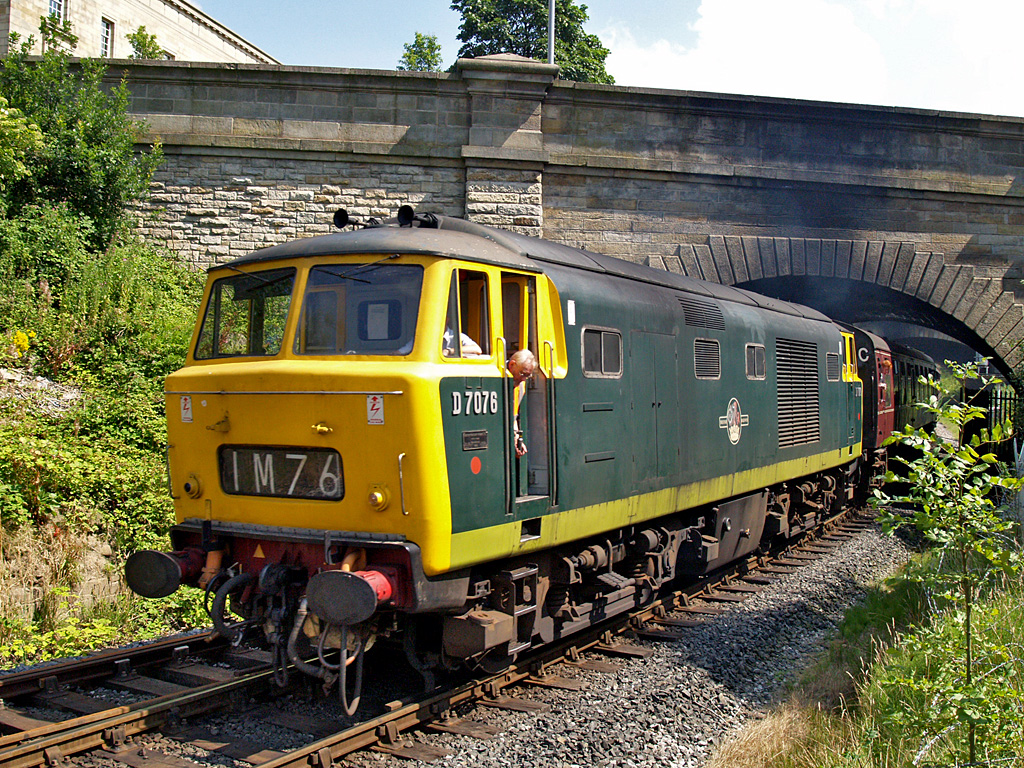
Green, full warning panel.

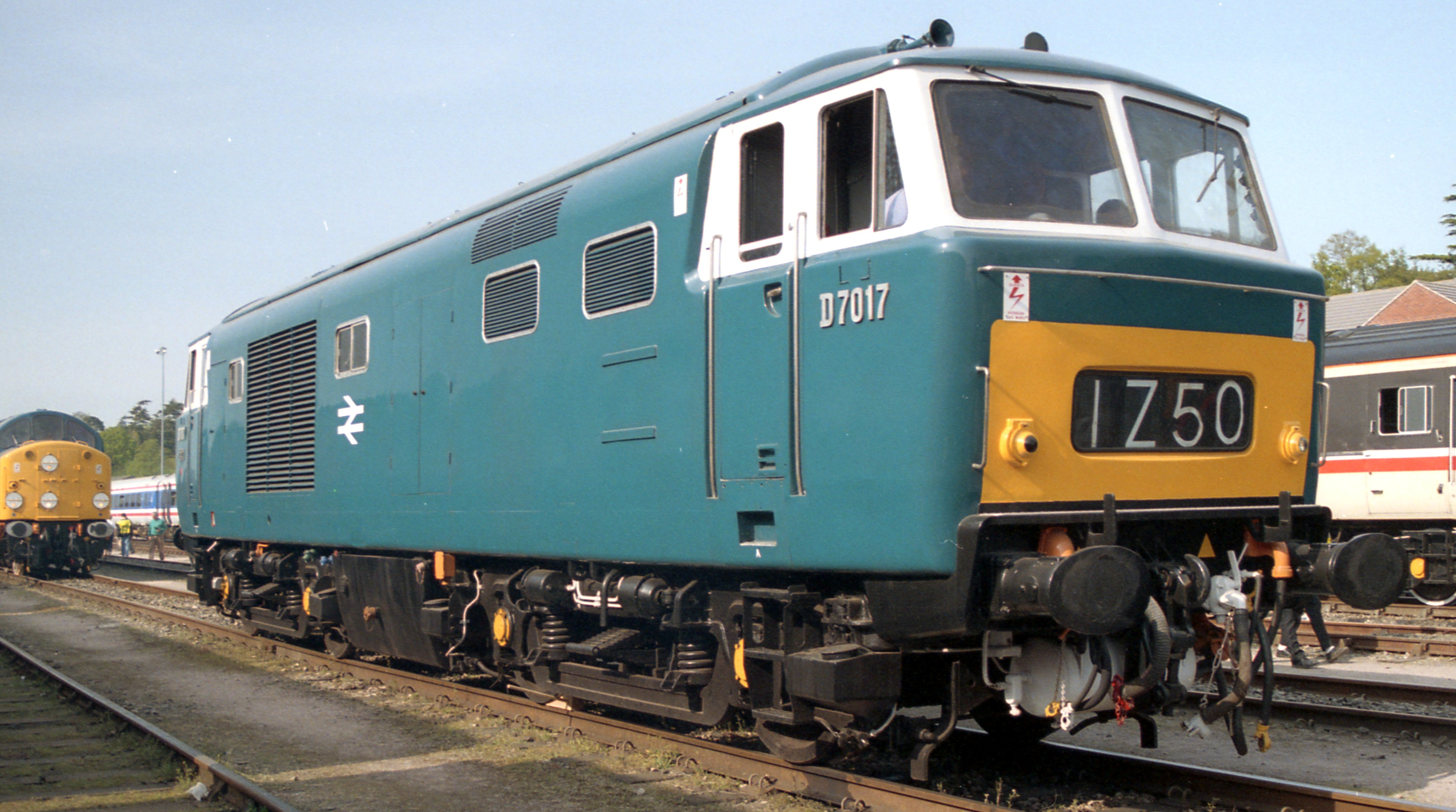
Blue, small warning panel.

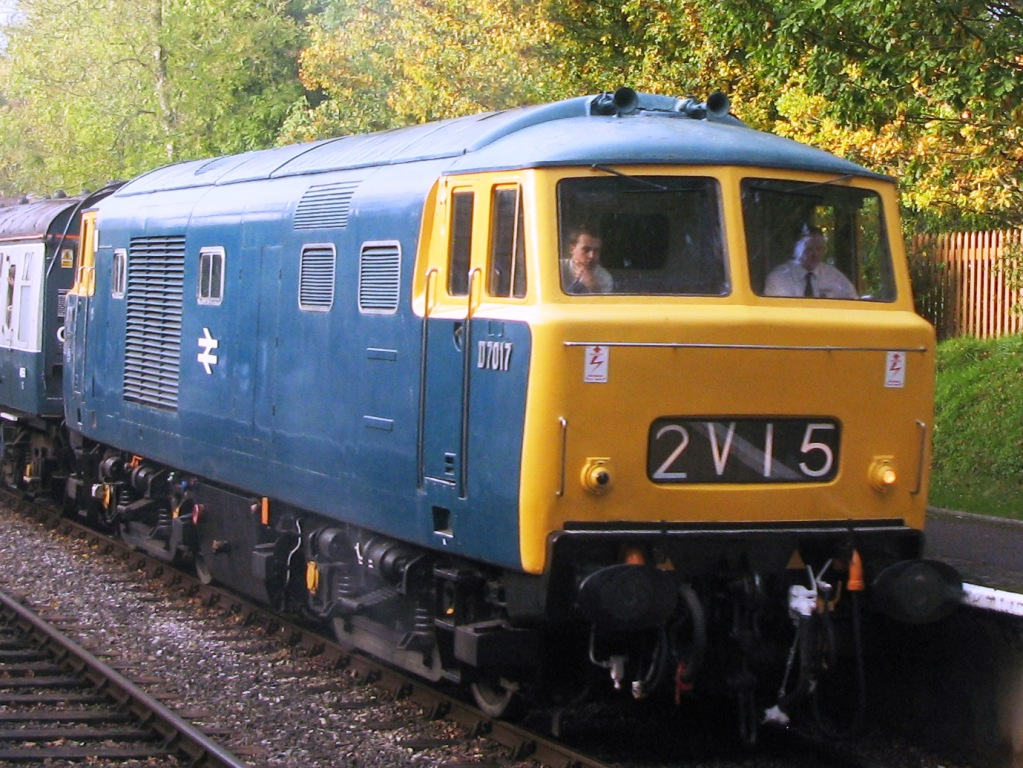
Blue, full warning panel.

== Withdrawal ==
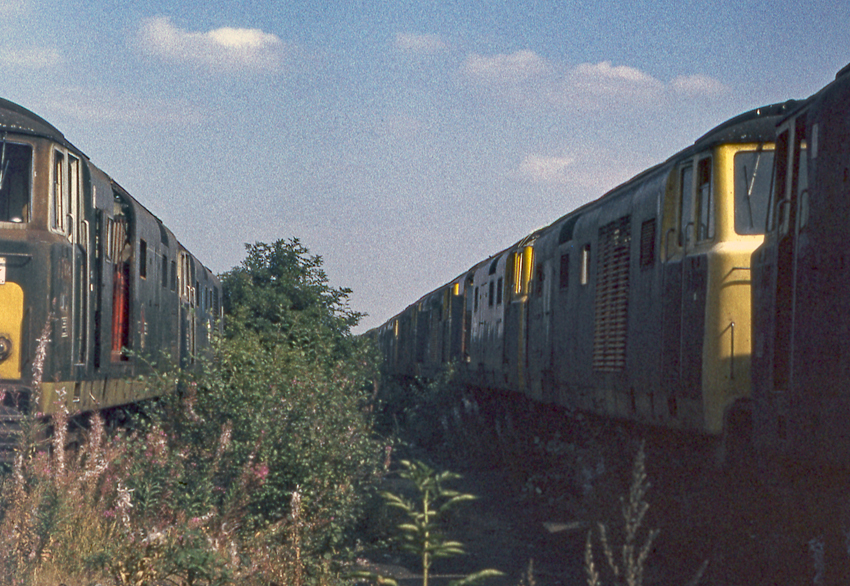
Hymeks on the scrap line at Swindon

The aim of the Modernisation Plan had been to stem BR's financial losses. These were thought to arise partially from the labour-intensive nature of steam locomotive use. The rapid introduction of diesel and electric traction eliminated steam from mainline use by 1968, but many unsuitable designs of diesel locomotive had been rushed into service in order to achieve this. The National Traction Plan of 1967/8 decreed that designs proving unreliable, expensive to maintain or non-standard should be eliminated as quickly as possible in order to reduce the number of diesel classes from 28 to 15 by the year 1974. The engineering factions of the British Railways Board, the body that oversaw BR's operations from 1962 onwards, felt that all of the Western Region's diesel-hydraulic fleet should be counted as non-standard and should be withdrawn as quickly as possible. This was driven in part by the introduction of Mark 2D air-conditioned carriages, which could only be heated electrically. This requirement for electric train supply (ETS) placed all diesel-hydraulic locomotives at a disadvantage compared with diesel-electrics. The entire class was withdrawn between 1971 and 1975. They were replaced by Class 37 diesel-electric locomotives made redundant in other regions as a result of a general decline in railborne freight traffic throughout the 1960s.

Formal withdrawal was not the end for three locomotives: 7076 and 7096 continued to be officially in non-revenue stock for some years and 7089 also continued, but renumbered as TDB968005 in the Departmental series.

== Preservation ==
Four locomotives have been preserved.

Pre TOPS	Owner	Location	Status	Notes or livery
D7017	Diesel & Electric Preservation Group (DEPG)	West Somerset Railway	Operational	BR Blue with DEPG Logo.
D7018	Diesel & Electric Preservation Group (DEPG)	West Somerset Railway	Operational	BR Green with half yellow warning panel.
D7029	Diesel Traction Group (DTG)	Severn Valley Railway	Undergoing Restoration	BR Blue yellow warning panel.
D7076	Bury Hydraulic Group (BHG)	East Lancashire Railway	Operational	BR Blue yellow warning panel.

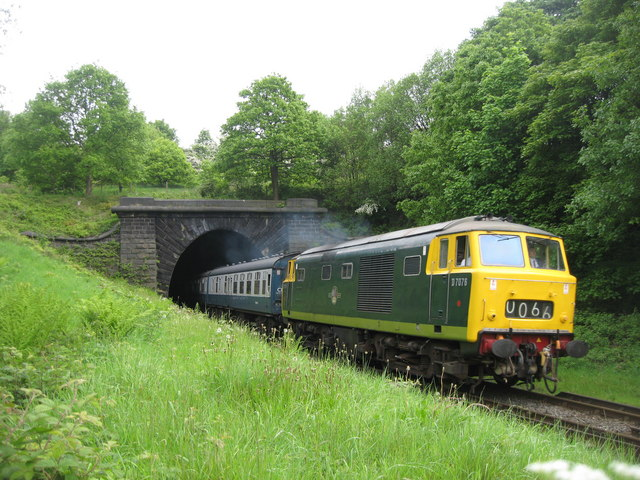
D7076 on the East Lancashire Railway

Notes:

- D7017 and D7018 have been fully restored to working order since withdrawal. D7018 was returned to service in June 2019 following an extensive overhaul. As of June 2022, D7018 was stabled at Williton railway station. On 9 May 2009, D7017 successfully hauled a 350-ton test train on the WSR, after a four-year overhaul. Both locomotives are painted in BR Green with yellow warning panels.
- D7029 - Severn Valley Railway
  D7029 is still undergoing a major restoration. In 2005 it moved from Old Oak Common shed, in west London, to the Severn Valley Railway for further work.
- D7076 - East Lancashire Railway
  D7076 survived, along with sister locomotive D7096, at the Railway Technical Centre near Derby, where they were used as dead loads for research purposes. Warship no. D832 Onslaught was additionally present at this site. Both Hymeks were in poor condition; however, it proved possible to rebuild one by using the other as a donor locomotive. D7076 was therefore restored using parts from D7096 and carries the number D7096 internally in one driving cab as a nod to the donor locomotive, which was reduced to a shell and subsequently scrapped.
  Having been restored to working order, and used on service trains, D7076 was taken out of traffic in late 2008 for repairs to a leaking turbo and coolant faults. The engine was subsequently found to need a complete rebuild, so in an unusual move, a Maybach MD-655 engine from D1041 (Western Prince, stopped for overhaul) was fitted into the locomotive to make it a runner. The resulting loco was nicknamed a "WesMek". However, late 2009 / early 2010 D7076 was taken out of traffic due to the Maybach MD-655 engine developing a liner seal problem. During summer 2011, two ex-Hymek MD-870 engines were discovered in a scrapyard in York, in excellent condition, having been used in a hospital emergency generator set. Both engines were purchased by D7076's owning group, and one has been fitted into D7076, which returned to service at the ELR's July 2011 diesel gala. The other engine is to be retained as a spare. On 11 November 2013 work started on bodywork repairs at Castlecroft Diesel Depot. In July 2014 D7076 returned to service on the East Lancs Railway in BR Blue Livery with full Yellow ends.

== In Fiction ==
In the Railway Series created by the Reverend W. Awdry, a Class 35 appears with the number D7101, later renamed "Bear".

== Model railways ==
In 1966, Hornby Railways launched its first version of the BR Class 35 (Hymek) in OO gauge. It has also been produced by Heljan and released under the EFE Rail label.

In 1970, Tri-ang added a Hymek to their 0 gauge battery-powered 'Big Big Train' toy series. This was made in two self-coloured plastic bodies, neither matching actual locomotive liveries. One was in the blue and white electric locomotive livery, lighter in colour than Rail Blue and labelled on the body sides as 'Blue Flier', then another in bright yellow. Mark 2 passenger coaches were also available in a set with it. The Big Big Train range only lasted a few years, from 1966 to 1972.

In 2007, Dapol introduced a Class 35 model for British N gauge. The model was produced as D7023 in two-tone BR green livery with full yellow cab ends, D7008 in two-tone BR green with yellow warning panels, D7066 in two-tone green only, and D7011 in BR blue with full yellow cab ends.

== Bibliography ==
- Reed, Brian (1974). Diesel-Hydraulic Locomotives of the Western Region. Newton Abbot: David and Charles. ISBN 0-7153-6769-2.
- Williams, Alan; Percival, David (1977). British Railways Locomotives and Multiple Units including Preserved Locomotives 1977. Shepperton: Ian Allan Ltd. ISBN 0-7110-0751-9.
- McManus, Michael. Ultimate Allocations, British Railways Locomotives 1948–1968. Wirral. Michael McManus.
- Clough, David N. (2011). Hydraulic vs Electric: The battle for the BR diesel fleet. Ian Allan. ISBN 978-0-7110-3550-8.
- Marsden, Colin J.; Fenn, Graham B. (1988). British Rail Main Line Diesel Locomotives. Sparkford: Haynes. pp. 142–145. ISBN 9780860933182. OCLC 17916362.
- Vehicle Diagram Book No. 100 for Main Line Diesel Locomotives (PDF). Derby: British Railways Board. October 1984. p. 91 (per pdf) – via Barrowmore MRG.
- "Outlines of Power No. 9: Class 35". Rail Enthusiast. EMAP National Publications. December 1983. pp. 32–33. ISSN 0262-561X. OCLC 49957965.
- Kerr, Fred (December 1983). "The 'Hymeks'". Rail Enthusiast. EMAP National Publications. pp. 51–55. ISSN 0262-561X. OCLC 49957965.
- Dunn, Pip (January 2008). "Hellfire 'Hymeks'!". Hornby Magazine. No. 7. Hersham: Ian Allan Publishing. pp. 64–67. ISSN 1753-2469. OCLC 226087101.
