= Oddingley railway station =

Disused railway station in Oddingley, Worcestershire

Coordinates: 52.2296°N 2.1235°W

Oddingley

General information
- Location: Oddingley, Worcestershire; England

Other information
- Status: Disused

History
- Original company: Birmingham and Gloucester Railway
- Pre-grouping: Midland Railway

Key dates
- September 1845: Opened
- 1 October 1855: Closed

Oddingley railway station served the village of Oddingley, Worcestershire, England, from 1845 to 1855 on the Birmingham and Gloucester Railway.

== History ==
The station was opened in September 1845 by the Birmingham and Gloucester Railway. It closed on 1 October 1855.

Preceding station	Disused railways	Following station
Bredicot	Birmingham and Gloucester Railway	Dunhampstead
