= British Rail corporate liveries =

Rail liveries introduced by British Rail

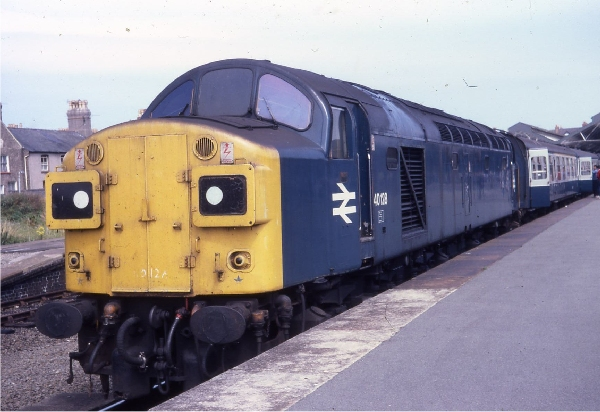
The classic Rail Blue colours; a Class 40 locomotive (no. 40128) with blue and grey coaching stock at Llandudno in 1982

British Rail's corporate liveries were identifiable colour designs on engines and coaches, which were changed at certain points in the history of British Rail. Although the organisation was associated with Rail Blue from the mid-1960s to the 1980s, a number of other schemes were also used, especially when it was split into operating units (or sectors) in the mid-1980s, and then from 1994 began to be privatised with distinct franchise brands, colours, and designs operating in certain regions.

== Pre-corporate liveries ==
At the formation of British Railways on 1 January 1948, early diesel, electric and gas turbine (Note: These gas turbine locomotives were numbered 18000 and 18100.) locomotives were already painted black with aluminium trim. By the late 1950s, this had been superseded by the same shade of green that was used on express passenger steam locomotives, although some locomotives were painted in a two-tone Brunswick and Sherwood green livery; Southern Region electric locomotives were painted a light shade of malachite green. Multiple units were also generally green, although this tended to be a lighter and bluer shade compared to the colour used on steam and diesel locomotives.

Corridor coaching stock was originally trialled in London & North Western Railway coach plum and off-white (nicknamed Plum and Spilt Milk) before Crimson (carmine red) and Cream livery (nicknamed Blood and Custard) was adopted across the network; non-corridor stock was painted plain Crimson.

In 1956, an all-over darker maroon, which more closely resembled the pre-nationalisation London, Midland & Scottish Railway livery, was reintroduced, except for the Southern Region, where locomotive-hauled stock was generally painted Coaching Stock Green (from July 1956 onwards) and a small number of express carriages on the Western Region which were in traditional GWR-style Chocolate and Cream.

With the reorganisation of British Railways in the mid-1960s, a complete break with the past was signalled by the introduction of a blue and grey livery which dominated all passenger rolling stock until the mid-1980s, when a new InterCity livery (dark grey and beige with a red and white waistband) was introduced along with a number of regional colour schemes.

== Early liveries ==
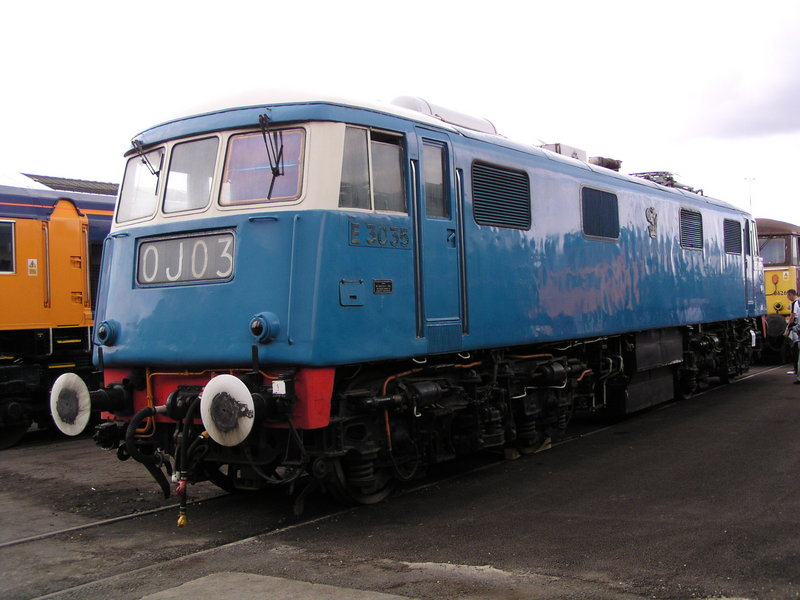
A Class 83 electric locomotive (no. E3035) in Electric Blue livery

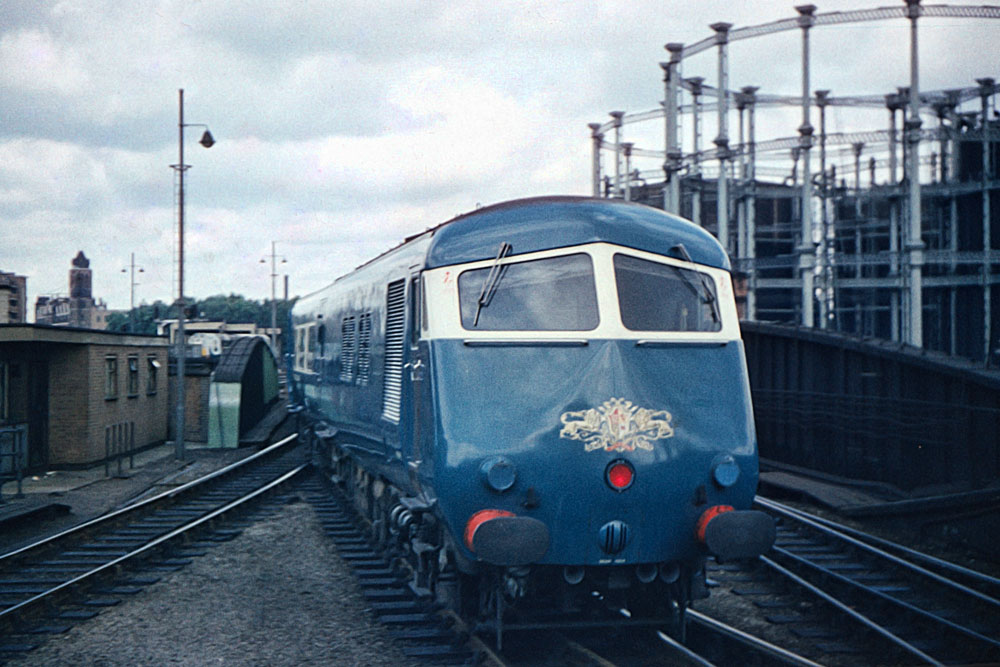
Blue Pullman in the original Nanking Blue livery at St Pancras railway station

The standard livery for most British Railways steam locomotives was black, often with a thin red, cream and grey trim; express passenger locomotives were not painted in the former middle chrome green colour of the Great Western Railway as is often stated, but were painted in British Standards: BS224 Deep Bronze Green also known as Land Rover Deep Bronze Green LRC001 with orange and black lining. This error in colour identification comes from an article and question published in a model railway magazine in the 1950s, where the responding editor made the error and it has frequently been repeated since then. This has been confirmed by records held at the National Railway Museum.

All Class 42 Warship diesels were delivered in green, but some Class 52s were delivered in maroon to match the then-standard coaching stock livery. This livery suited these diesel hydraulic classes and allowed the Western Region to once again show a degree of independence; it was not applied to any other diesel or electric classes (other than the Warships).

The 25 kV electric locomotives were painted from new in a striking shade of bright blue, known as Electric Blue. They retained this livery for some years, before being painted in Rail Blue when that became the standard.

In 1964, as part of a plan to develop a new corporate image for British Railways, a number of experiments were tried:

- Two Class 31 diesel locomotives were painted in trial liveries. No. D5578 was painted in an unlined Light Electric Blue, and No.D5579 was painted in a colour variously described as Bronze Gold and Golden Ochre.
- The first Class 52 Western, no. D1000 Western Enterprise, was painted in a pale brown livery known as Desert Sand when it was first delivered in 1961.
- Another Class 52, no. D1015 Western Champion, was delivered in another, darker yellow/brown colour described as Golden Ochre, though somewhat different from that applied to D5579. These non-standard liveried Western diesel hydraulics were also fitted with the cast aluminium lion and wheel emblem that was standard issue on the 25 kV electric locomotives.

=== Coaching stock from 1948 ===
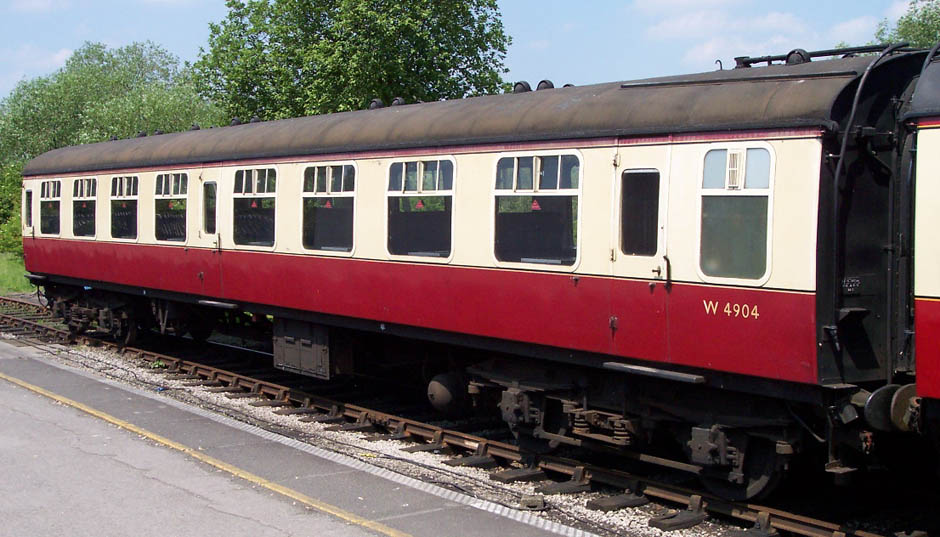
British Railways coaches in the crimson and cream livery used from 1949

Discussions on the livery for British Railways coaching stock in 1948 eventually settled on a network-wide two-tone livery of crimson (colour 540 in BS specification 381c) and cream for corridor coaches, with all-over crimson being used for local, non-corridor stock. The colours were chosen to be different from those of any of the Big Four pre-nationalisation railway companies, while retaining a traditional aspect. However, many people were not happy with the loss of the traditional historic regional colour schemes as used by the former private companies.

=== The second phase ===
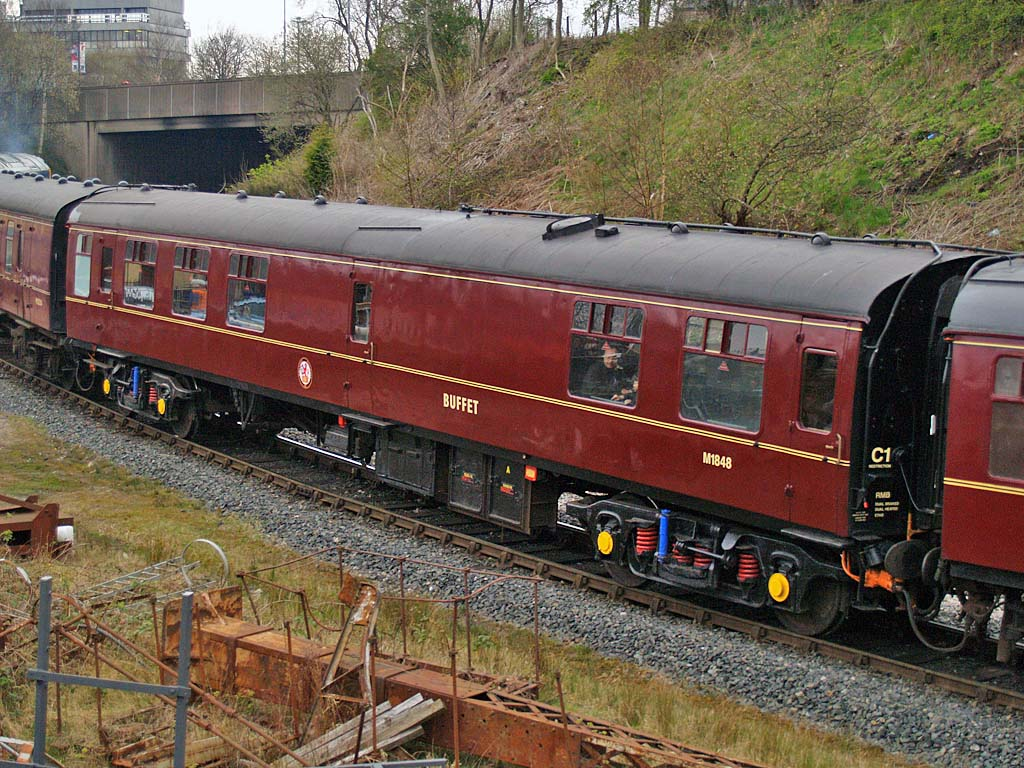
British Railways Mark 1 coaches in early 1960s maroon livery

From 1956, maroon (similar to crimson lake) was adopted as the standard colour for coaching stock, with corridor coaches lined and non-corridor plain initially; later, all stock was lined. There was a return of some regional schemes; the Western Region turned out some Mark 1 sets for named expresses in chocolate and cream, similar to that used by the GWR before nationalisation. Until the introduction of Mark 1 catering vehicles in the late 1950s, these trains had matching former GWR catering vehicles. The special saloons and a few other special coaches were also repainted in chocolate and cream but regular former GWR coaches carried maroon. From July 1956, the Southern Region began using a coaching stock green that was somewhat darker than the malachite green colour of the old Southern Railway and this extended to former Southern vehicles as well as Mark 1 stock.

For cost reasons, liveries were usually changed piecemeal, when coaches came in for scheduled maintenance. Coaches from different regions could also often find themselves coupled together and trains of two or three mixed liveries were not uncommon. Due to the consequent muddle of liveries, many trains began to get an untidy, if not tatty, appearance which added to the run-down image of the railway. The rebranding of British Railways to British Rail on 1 January 1965 was coupled with the introduction of an entirely new national livery.

=== XP64 ===
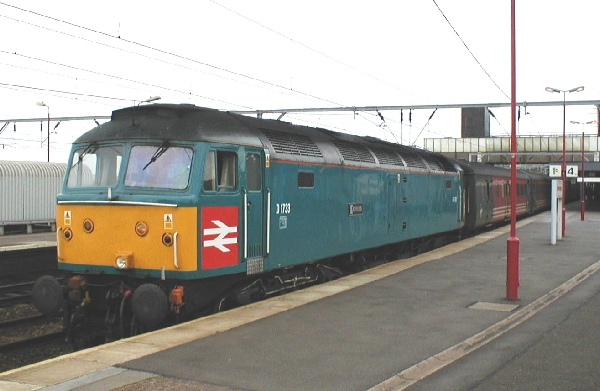
A Virgin CrossCountry Class 47 (no. 47853) in a recreation of the XP64 livery in 2001

A mock-up for the British Railways Mark 2 stock was displayed at the Design Centre, 28 Haymarket, London, (the showrooms of the Council of Industrial Design) in 1964. This included many of the features which were later incorporated in the Mark 2 and trialled in an experimental train designated XP64. This mock-up was shown in an orange and grey livery which, however, never appeared on rolling stock in service. The XP64 train was used to test technology and carriage arrangements for the planned Mark 2 coaches. The coaches for the XP64 train were painted in a slightly lighter version of what would eventually become Rail Blue, with a 44-inch-wide (1,100 mm) Pale Ivory stripe centred on the passenger windows, and brown underframe. One locomotive, Class 47 No.D1733, was painted to match the coaching stock. In 2001, as passenger work for diesel locomotives operated by Virgin CrossCountry came to an end, a number of their Class 47s were painted in heritage liveries that they had carried in the past, including the former D1733 (now 47853) which once again carried a near-correct version of the XP64 livery.

== Rail Blue ==
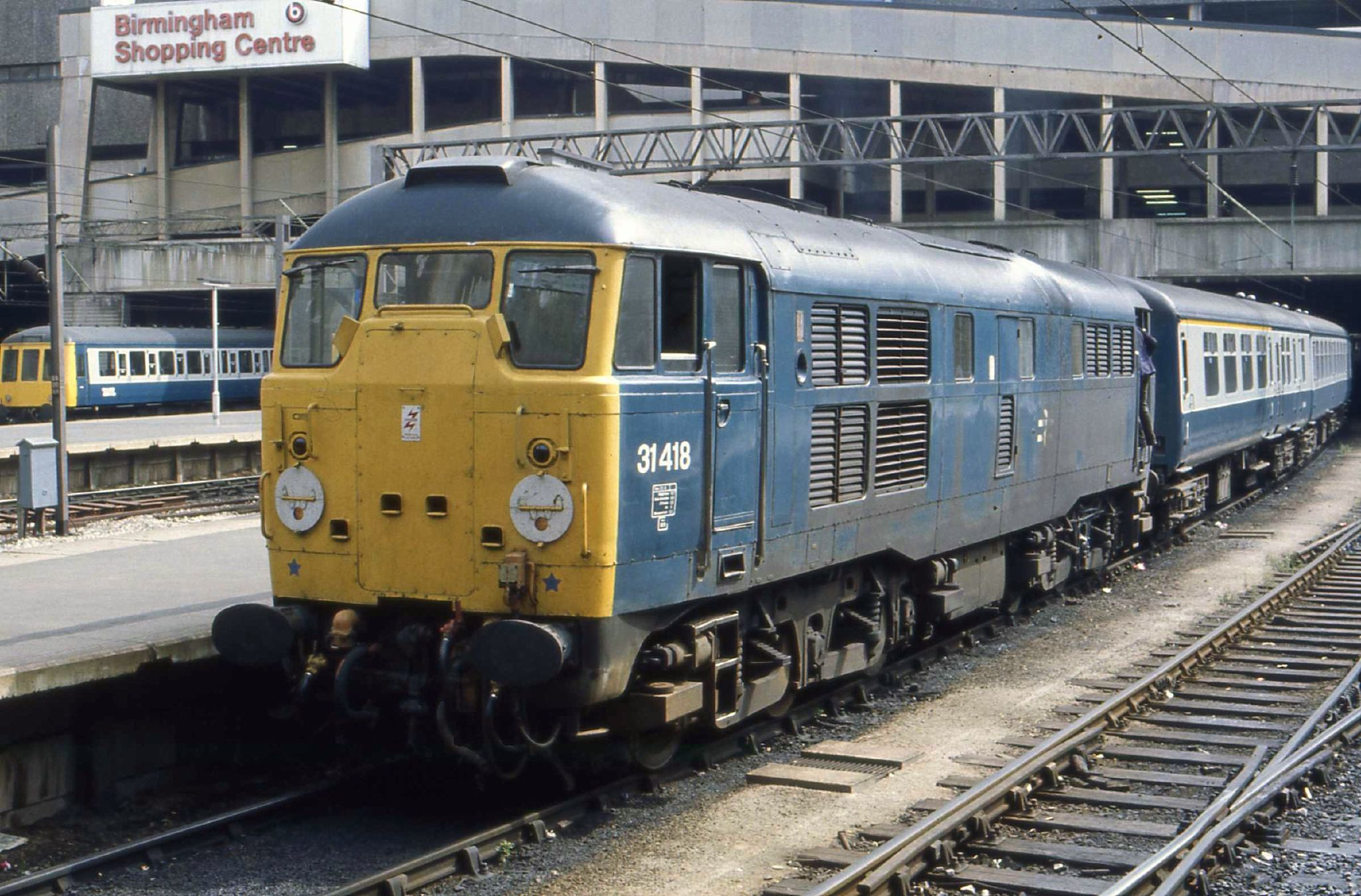
A Class 31 diesel locomotive in the standard Rail Blue colour scheme

Eventually, it was decided to standardise on a colour which became known as Rail Blue. Introduced in 1965 and also known as Monastral Blue, the colour was defined by British Rail standards BR28/6001 (Airless spray finish) and BR28/5321 (Brush finish). It was a dark, greyish blue tone which hid the effects of dirt well. In the early years, the colour faded quite badly, becoming lighter and paler with time although this problem had been overcome by the late 1970s. European paint code RAL5020 (Ocean Blue) is a good match to Rail Blue. There is also a British Standard paint colour BS381C 114 called Rail Blue, which was introduced in 1964. The new British Rail double arrow symbol on locomotives (or leading vehicle, as was the case on multiple unit stock) and the vehicle number and other ancillary markings written in the Rail Alphabet typeface were other integral parts of the livery. This style of livery was also used by CSX Transportation.

=== Locomotives ===
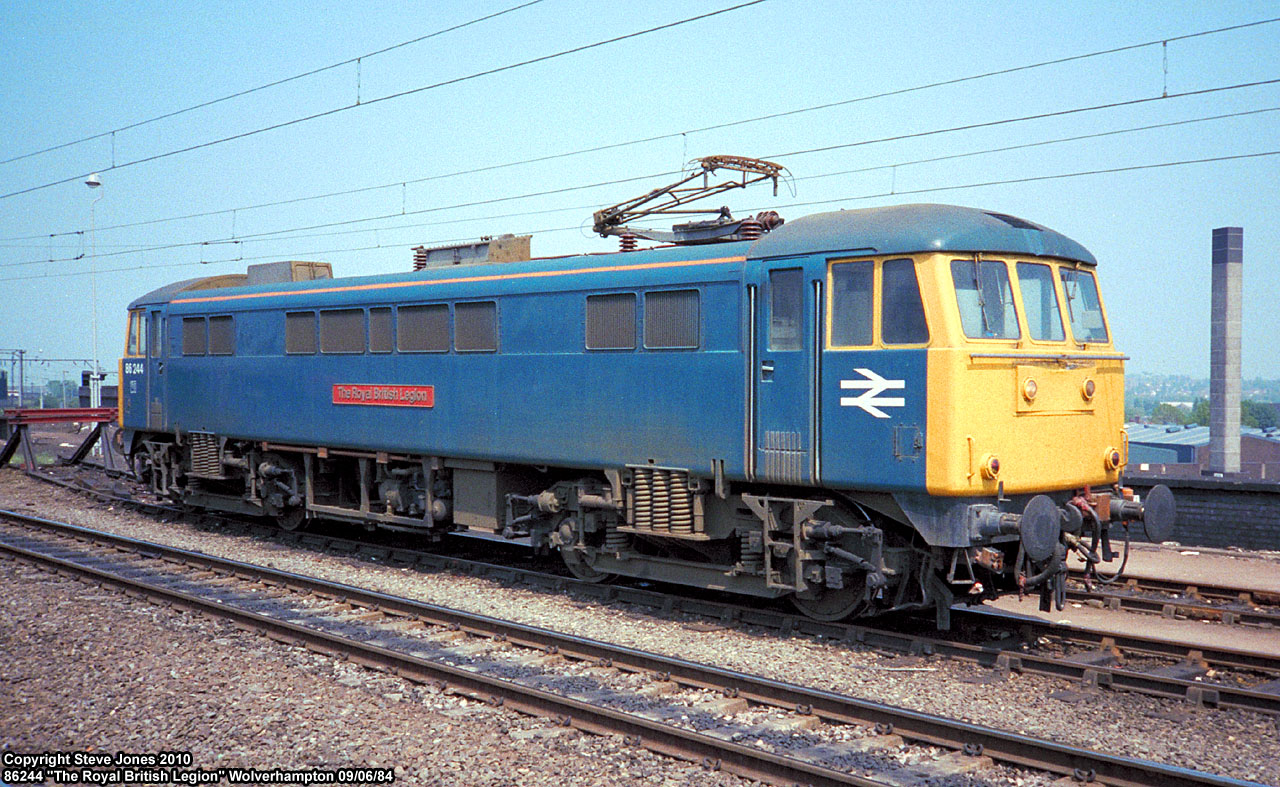
A Class 86 electric locomotive (no. 86244) at Wolverhampton

This colour was applied to all diesel and electric locomotives, with the exception of the ends, which were painted yellow to improve visibility and the underframes and buffer beams which were painted black; the paints being to BSS 2660-0.003 and BSS 2660-9.103 respectively. As Rail Blue was introduced, the last locomotive recorded as being outshopped in a previous livery was Class 43 D838 Rapid which left Swindon Works in August 1968 in maroon.

The Vale of Rheidol Railway remained steam operated past the general end of steam traction in 1968. Accordingly, the three remaining Vale of Rheidol Railway steam locomotives (Class 98) received the Rail Blue colour scheme and the double arrow logo on their side tanks. The smokebox, running plate and running gear remained black; the bufferbeam remained red.

=== Coaches and multiple units ===
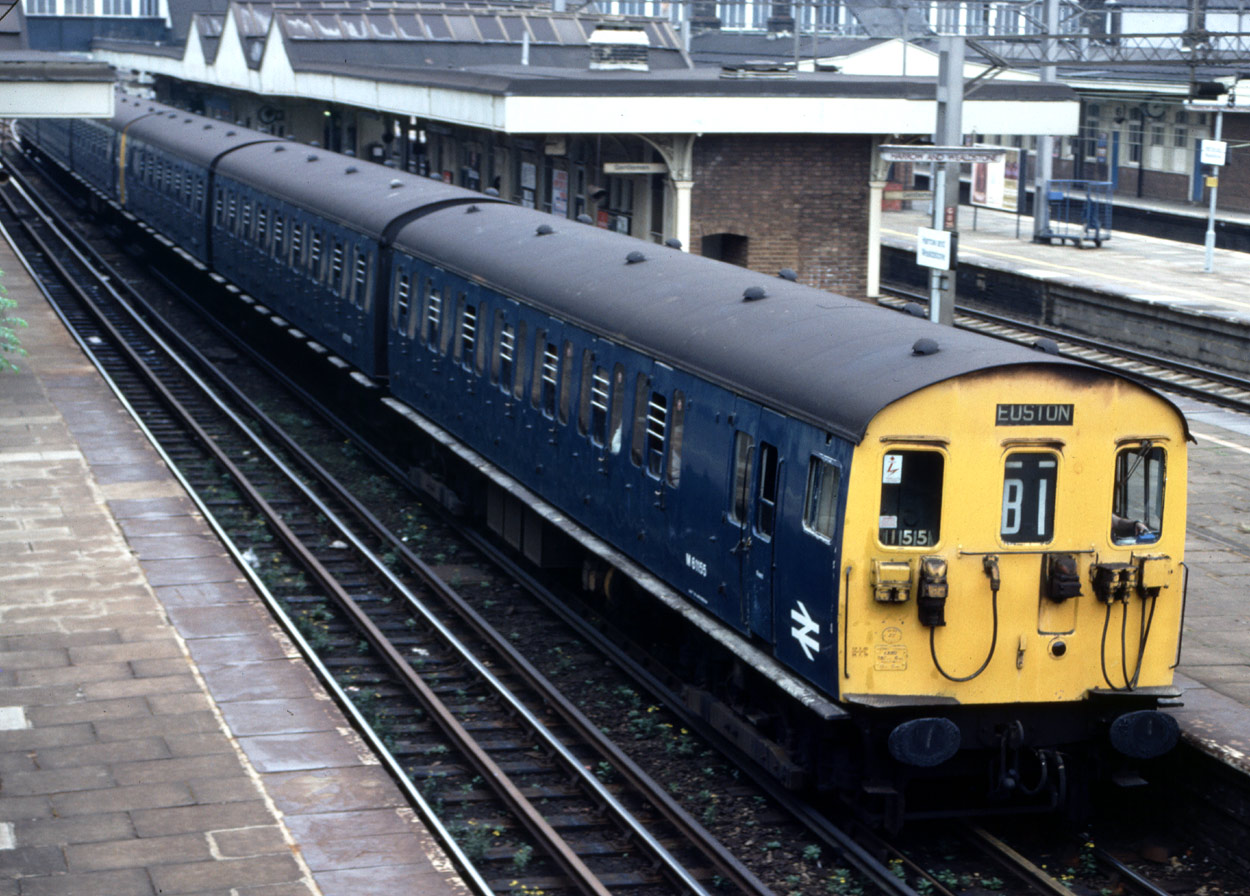
A Class 501 EMU in Rail Blue calling at Harrow and Wealdstone

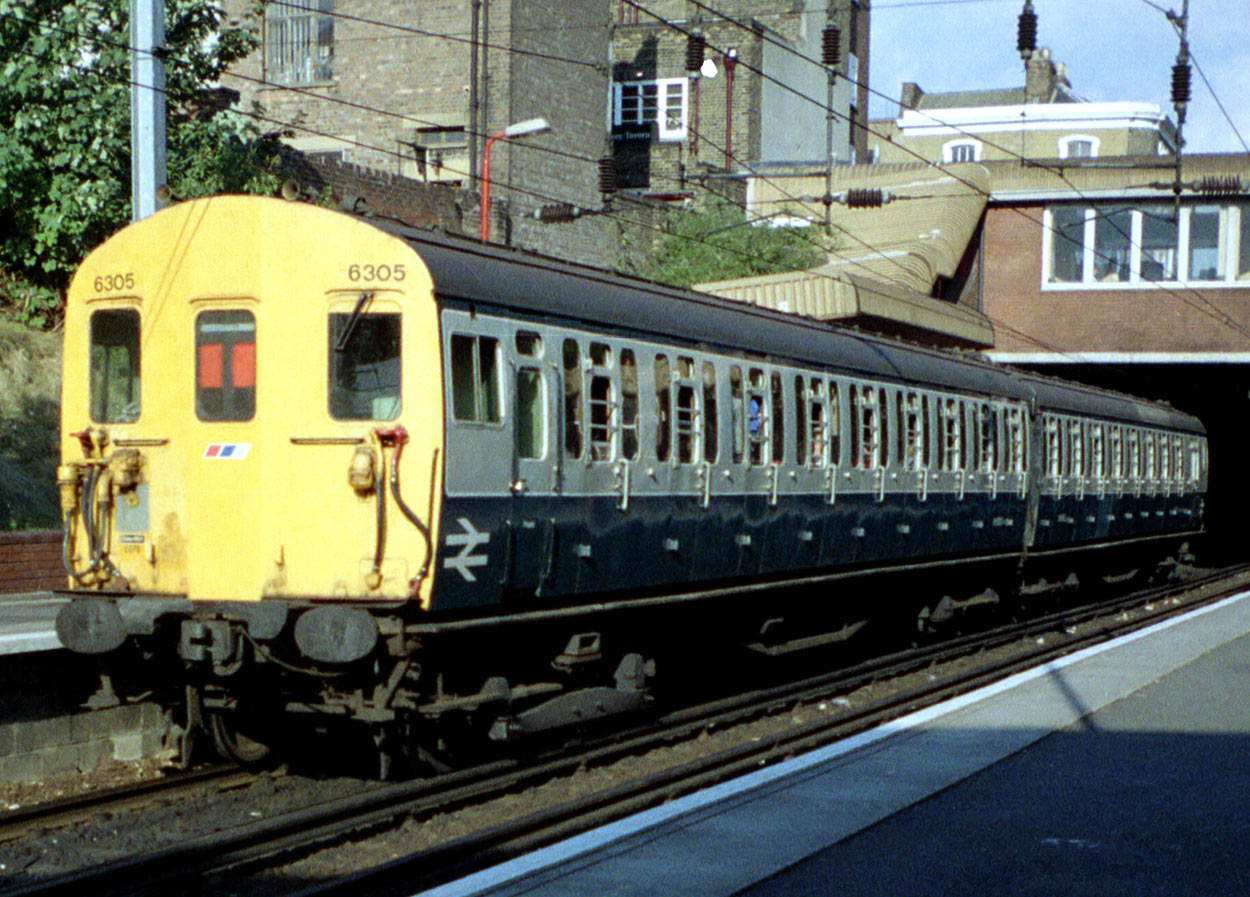
A Class 416 EMU in British Rail blue/grey livery calling at Dalston Kingsland

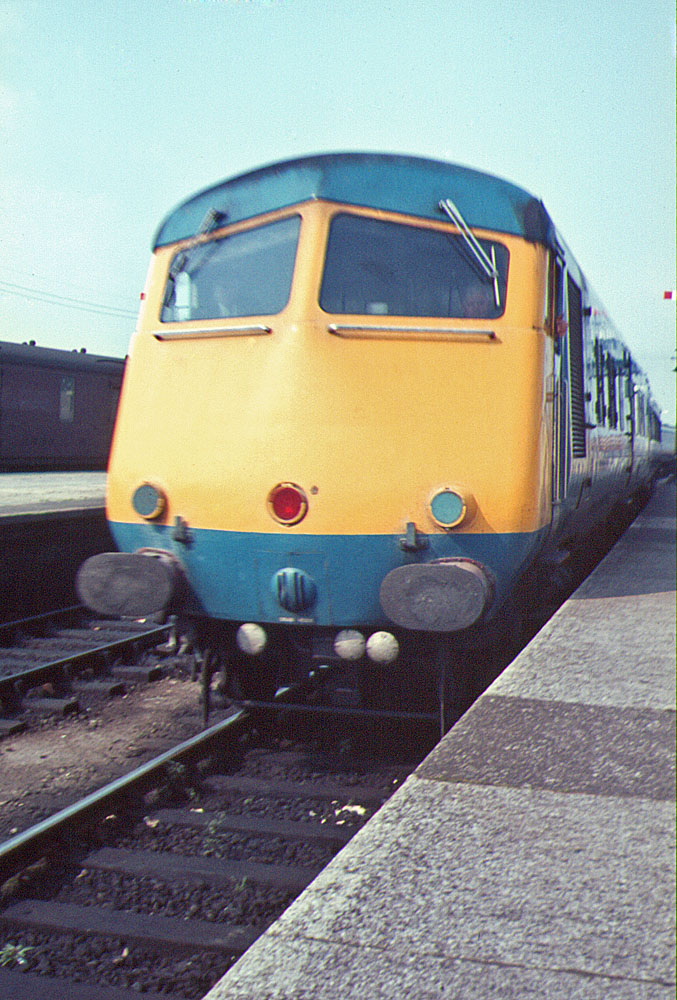
The Blue Pullman at Swansea in 1967

Corridor coaching stock and certain express multiple unit classes were painted in Rail Blue, with a 44-inch Pearl Grey (BS 2660-9-095) horizontal panel centred vertically on the main windows, outlined by a narrow white line. This grey panel finished just short of the end of the coach leaving a small amount of Rail Blue which then continued round onto the end of the coach. Roofs were dark grey and underframes originally brown, but later black.

Non-corridor coaching stock and other multiple units received all-over Rail Blue until about 1980, when most received the same blue/grey livery as corridor coaching stock.

The 4-REP and 3/4-TC electric multiple units were a notable oddity, initially receiving all-over Rail Blue despite being express corridor stock. They were repainted into blue/grey in the early 1970s.

From 1974, some diesel multiple unit sets, after being refurbished, were painted white with a wide blue band under the windows and full yellow ends.

From 1966 until withdrawal, Pullman Coaches were also painted in the reversal of the normal coach livery, with the blue and grey areas transposed. The Blue Pullman sets retained their livery of Nanking Blue (albeit with full yellow ends) until 1969, when they were repainted in the reversed grey and blue livery.

=== Local variations ===
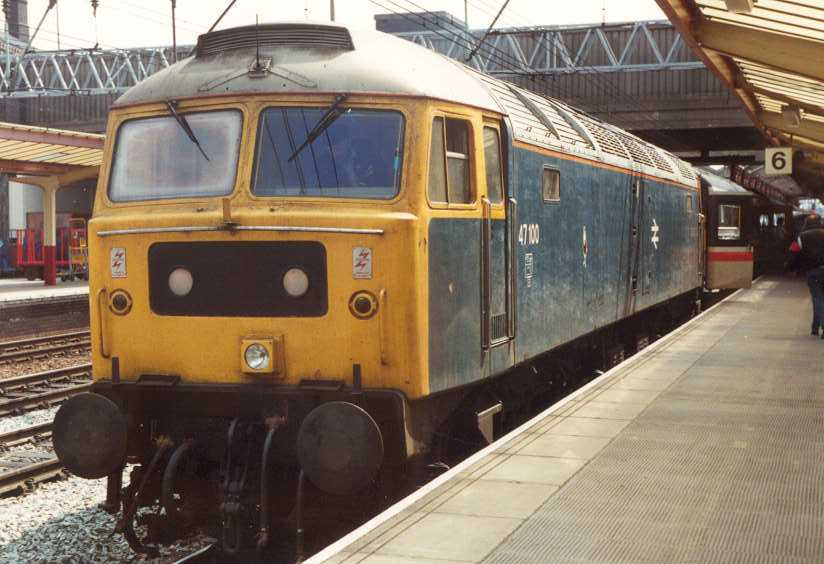
A Class 47 locomotive (no. 47100) with the trademark Stratford TMD grey roof

In 1977, two Class 47 locomotives, nos. 47163 and 47164, were painted by Stratford TMD with silver roofs and other decorations, including a full body height Union Flag on each side, in celebration of Queen Elizabeth II's silver jubilee. Several other Class 47 locomotives, some Class 31s and even some DMU cabs were also painted subsequently by Stratford with grey roofs; the variation became something of a trademark for the depot.

After this time, small variations in the Rail Blue livery became much more common. Several Class 31 locomotives received white waist stripes, these being particularly associated with the depots at Old Oak Common and Finsbury Park. Also on the Eastern Region, Class 55 Deltic locomotives, based at Finsbury Park, acquired white surrounds to their cab windows.

Eastfield TMD, near Glasgow, also embellished a few examples of the Class 37/0s allocated to the depot, with a lower bodyside white stripe in the mid-80s but BR reportedly ordered swift repaints back to the standard blue livery.

=== Sealink ===
Sealink ferry Caledonian Princess in 1984.

British Rail's corporate identity manual also specified a livery for ships under its Sealink brand. The lower part of the hull was painted in Rail Blue and the funnel was painted in Flame Red with a large white double arrow logo.

== Moving away from Rail Blue ==
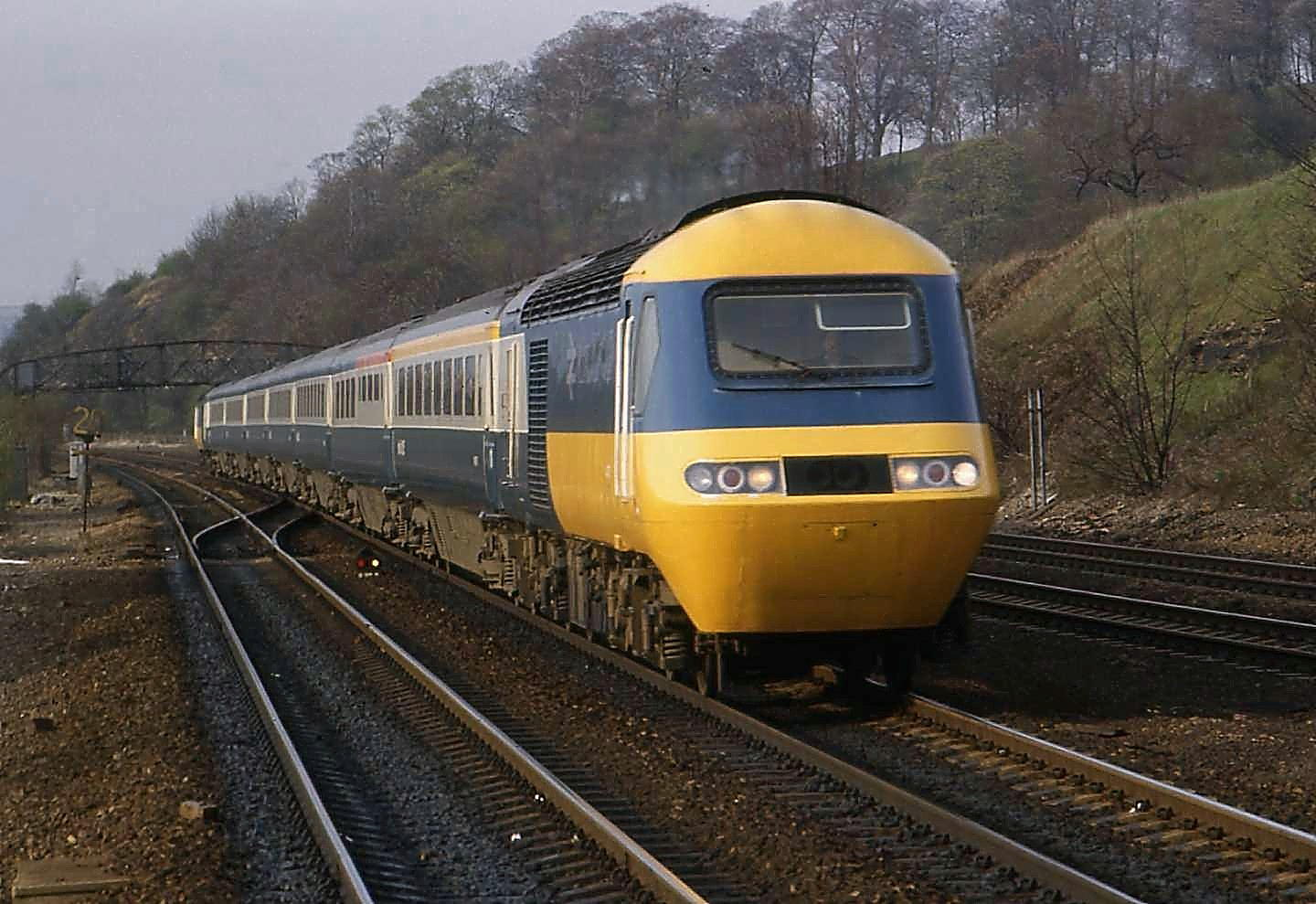
A BR HST set in original InterCity 125 Yellow and Blue livery

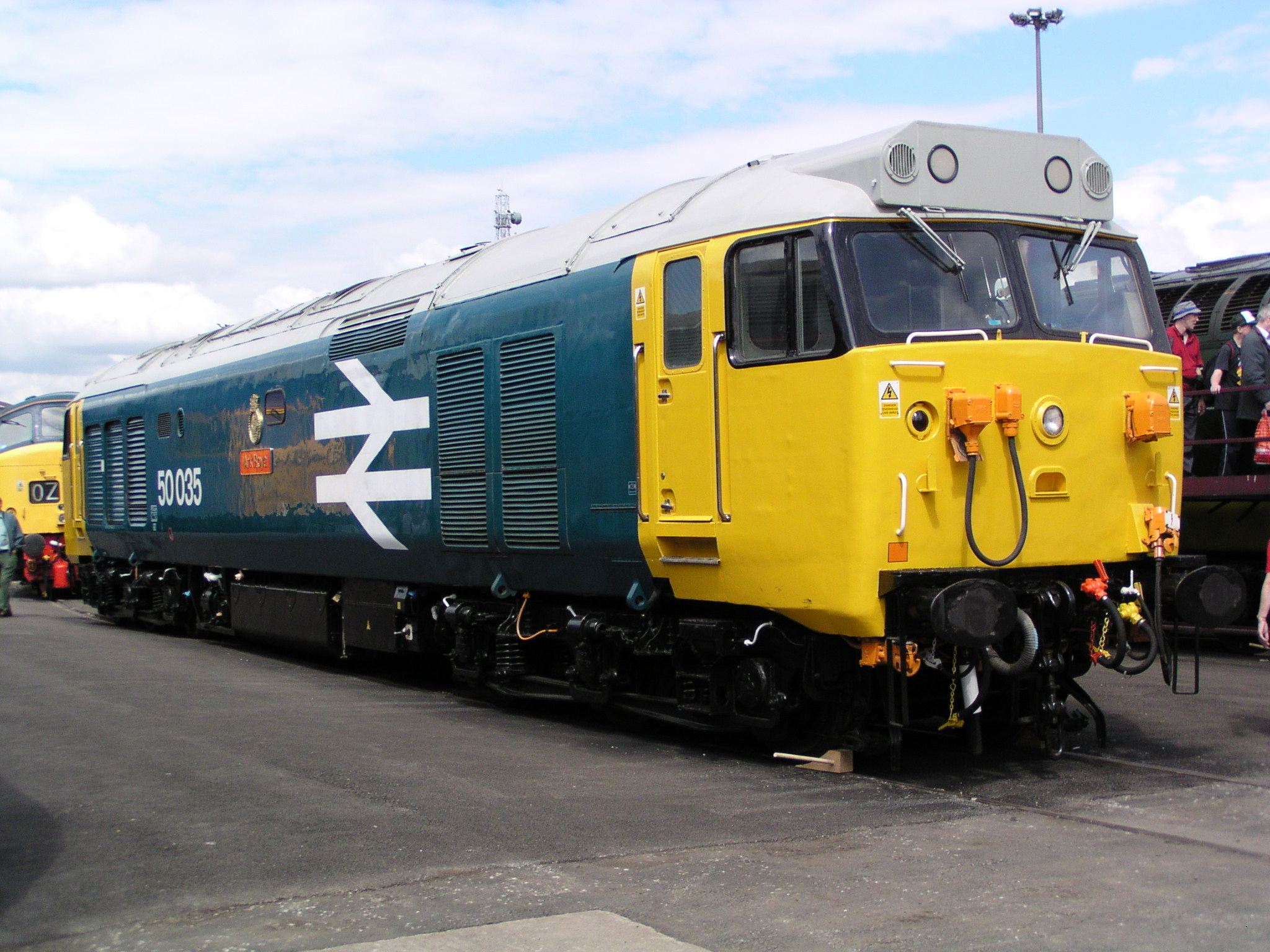
The Large Logo livery on Class 50 (no. 50035)

The first break in the uniformity of Rail Blue came in 1976, with the introduction of the first InterCity 125 (HST). The distinctive angular shape of the HST power cars did not lend itself to applying yellow on the leading face, so the yellow was wrapped around and extended along the side of each power car; the coaches retained the usual blue/grey coaching stock livery.

In 1978, the British Railways Board began planning a new livery for the future. In that August, Class 56 diesel locomotive no. 56036 was painted to test a modified livery of all-over Rail Blue with the entire loco front in bright yellow to improve visibility; this extended down the sides of the locomotive to the rear of the cab windows which were, in turn, outlined in black. This livery was known as Large Logo livery as each side of the locomotive was dominated by a full body height BR double arrow symbol and had the loco number prominently displayed at twice the previous size.

This livery was well received by enthusiasts but, as the Class 56s only hauled freight, it was decided to extend the experiment to a passenger locomotive. Thus a Class 47 locomotive, no. 47170 County of Norfolk, which was allocated to Stratford and a regular performer on trains between Liverpool Street and Norwich, was painted in Large Logo livery. Initially, new locomotives were still painted in the traditional Rail Blue livery but, starting with Class 56 no. 56084, the new Large Logo version was standard on new locos delivered to BR. After this date, the passenger versions of Class 37 and 47, as well as Class 50, were routinely outshopped in this livery.

== Sectorisation ==
=== InterCity ===
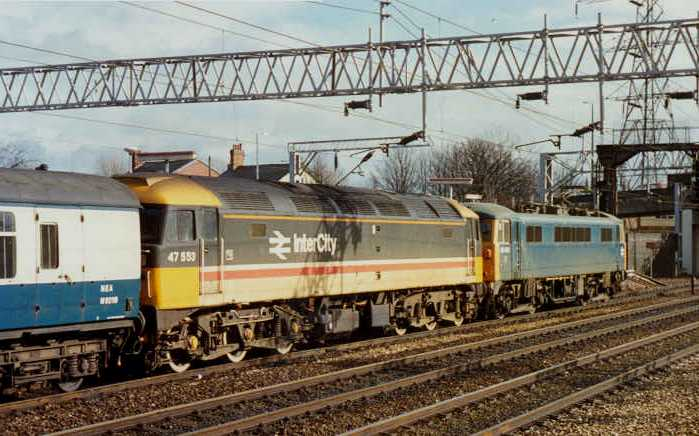
A Class 47 locomotive (no. 47553) in InterCity livery, contrasting with the Rail Blue of leading Class 86 locomotive (no. 86402)

Following the introduction of the Advanced Passenger Train in 1983, a similar livery to the APT's (dark grey on the upper body and light beige on the lower, with two stripes of red and white separating them) was applied experimentally to two HST sets and the coaches operating the Gatwick Express service between London Victoria and Gatwick Airport. This was referred to as the InterCity Executive livery, as the sets used were dedicated to operating morning/evening services operated for business travellers. Despite the InterCity brand having been introduced in 1966, the word Executive was dropped in 1985 and the livery was applied to all coaches and many locomotives used on InterCity services.

=== London and the South East ===
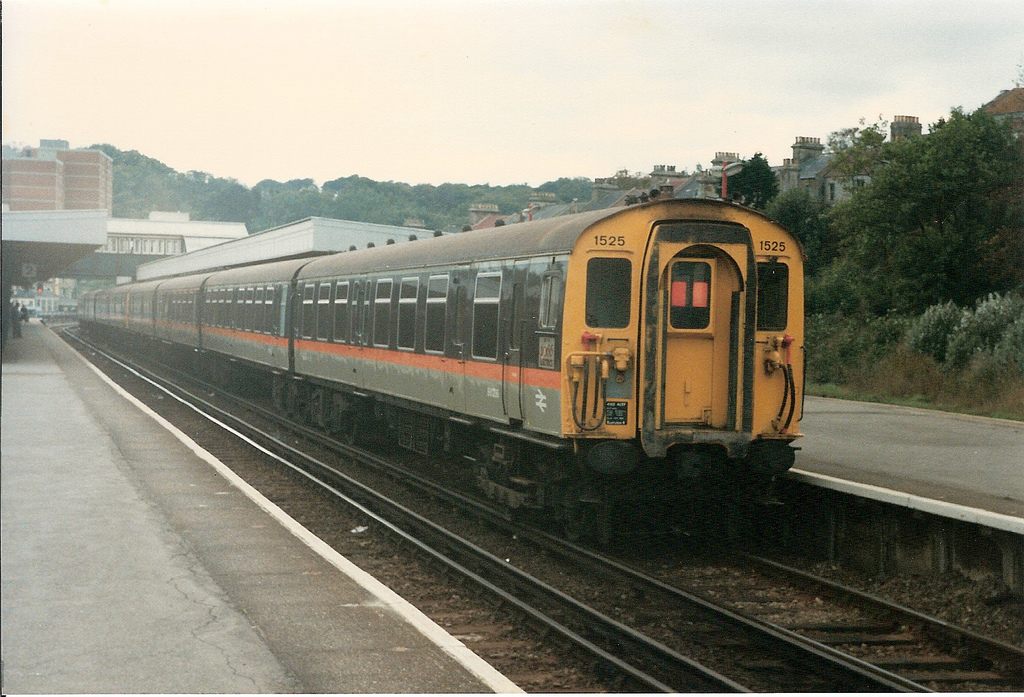
A Class 411 (4-CEP) electric multiple unit in the L&SE sector's Express livery (Jaffa Cake livery) on the 1066 electric service to Hastings in 1986

Launched as the London & South East sector's Express livery, this was a short-lived scheme which appeared on a limited number of units and routes before the advent of Network SouthEast's toothpaste red, white and blue striped livery. The livery comprised brown upper panels, with a colour described variously as biscuit or fawn along the lower panels and separated by a broad orange band. The livery derived its nickname from a perceived resemblance to the internal appearance of a Jaffa Cake. Variants where the band was blue (outer suburban) or green (inner suburban) instead of orange were planned, but never implemented.

The livery was applied only to some Class 309 Clacton units on the former Eastern Region and to a few of Classes 411 (4-Cep), 419 (MLV) and 421 (4-Cig) on the former Southern Region.

The Class 309 units worked between Liverpool Street and Clacton, occasionally also to Ipswich and Norwich; later, upon transfer, the livery briefly appeared around Manchester and Birmingham. The Southern Region types worked mostly on the Charing Cross/Cannon Street - Hastings, via Battle/Dover and Ramsgate routes, and on the Victoria/London Bridge - Brighton/Littlehampton/Hastings, via Eastbourne routes. The new livery was used with the introduction of the Hastings Line electrification in 1986, to promote new electric trains on that line. The anniversary of the Battle of Hastings which took place in 1066 was also used in publicity for the line. Due to the small number of units repainted, it was common to see trains with two or more units in different liveries.

=== Network SouthEast ===
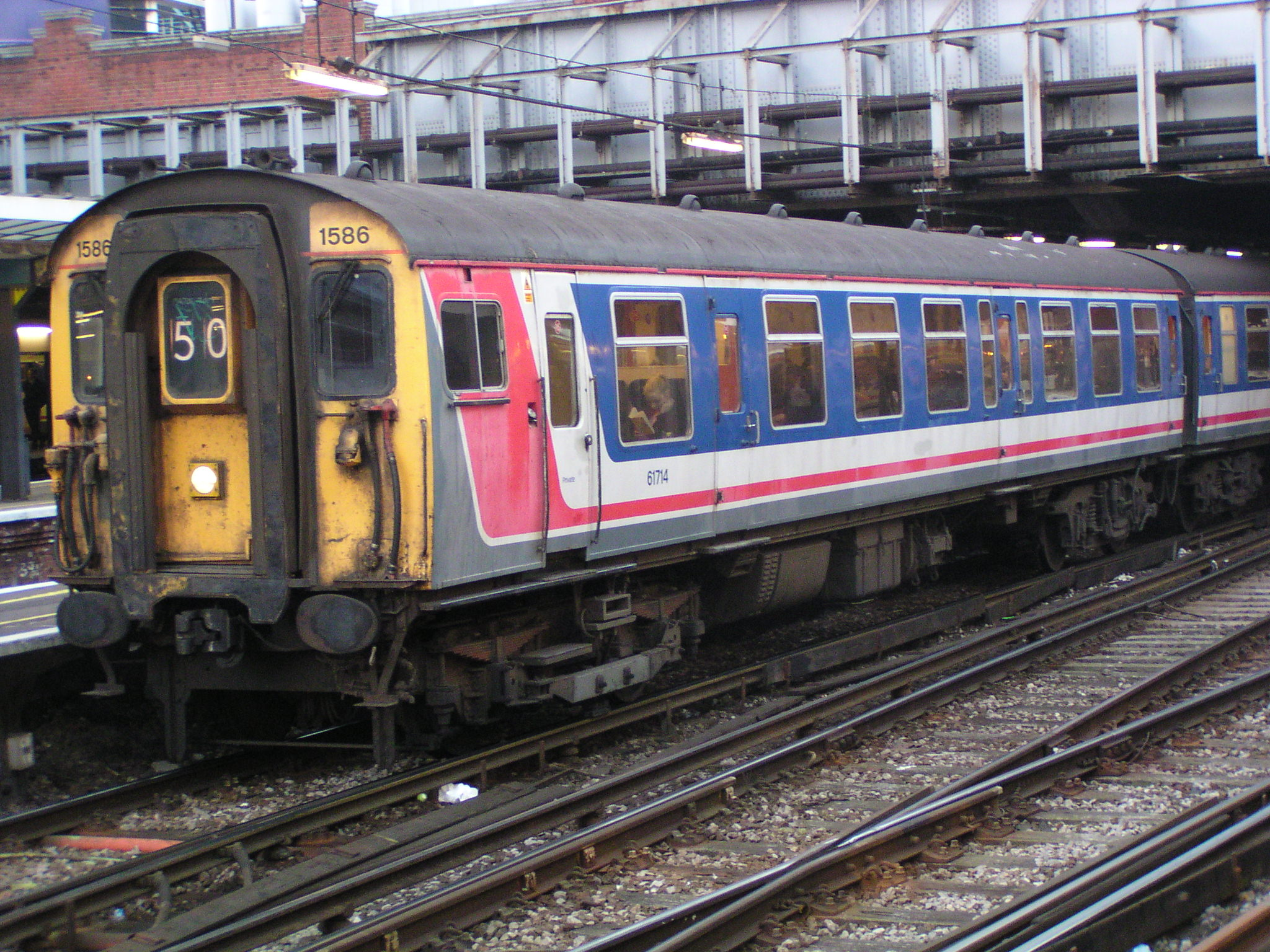
Faded Network SouthEast livery

On 10 June 1986, British Rail launched Network SouthEast, an organisation designed to cut across the traditional regional boundaries and deliver a co-ordinated train service for London and the surrounding region. For this new venture, a new livery - a paler shade of blue than Rail Blue, with three stripes of white, red and grey - was created with a Class 47, no. 47573 The London Standard, painted in the new livery specifically for the launch ceremony. As well as rolling stock and multiple units, a number of Classes 47 and 50 locomotives dedicated to Network SouthEast passenger services were painted in this livery. A later version made minor changes to the livery, the main one of which was to darken the main shade of blue used. This livery is also often nicknamed toothpaste livery by rail enthusiasts due to the multicoloured stripes resembling striped toothpaste.

=== ScotRail ===
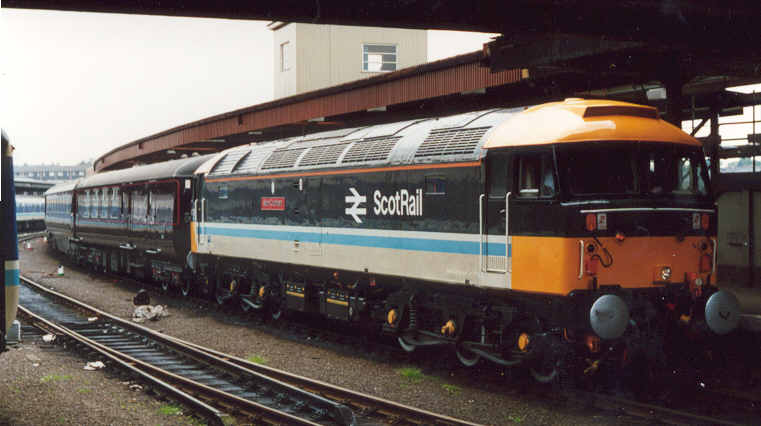
A Class 47 (no. 47702) in ScotRail livery at York in 1988

ScotRail was the brand name under which British Rail operated passenger services in Scotland and cross-border services to Northern England and London. A corporate livery was created for major express services in Scotland, which effectively consisted of the InterCity livery with the red stripe replaced by a light blue one.

=== Regional Railways ===
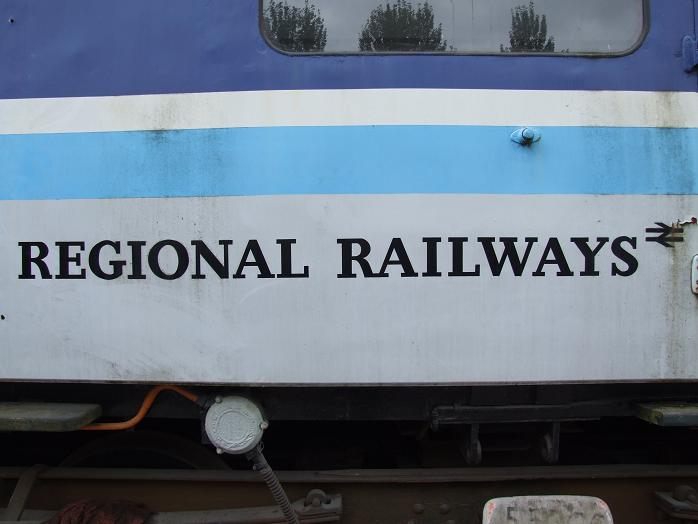
A close-up of Regional Railways' livery and logo

Upon sectorisation, most secondary passenger routes which did not fall under the InterCity or Network SouthEast banner were redesignated as Regional Railways (originally Provincial). A livery was created similar to ScotRail's, but with the upper dark grey bodyside replaced with a dark blue. A number of sets of coaching stock and a handful of locomotives received the livery, as well as most new multiple units and some existing ones.

Scottish rolling stock not covered by the ScotRail livery (generally those on secondary services) received the Regional Railways livery, but with ScotRailbranding.

=== Rail Express Systems ===
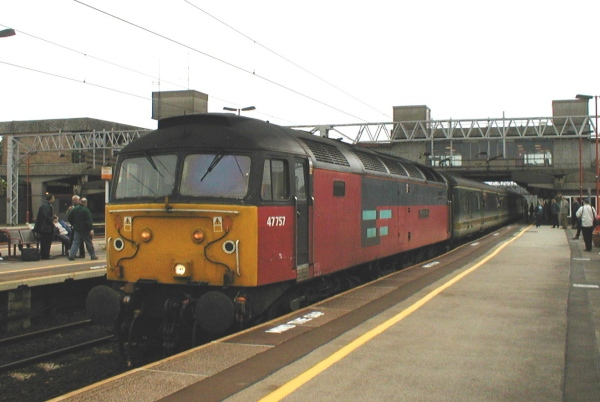
No.47757 carrying Rail Express System livery

Rail Express Systems was the sector of British Rail responsible for transport of mail and parcels traffic. Its rolling stock initially carried the standard Rail Blue (or blue and grey) livery; in 1991, it introduced a new livery of red and grey, with pale blue and grey flashes.

The livery was carried on the rolling stock, but also on a number of locomotives which were dedicated to mail and parcels traffic, mainly of Classes 47 and 90.

=== Railfreight and associated liveries ===
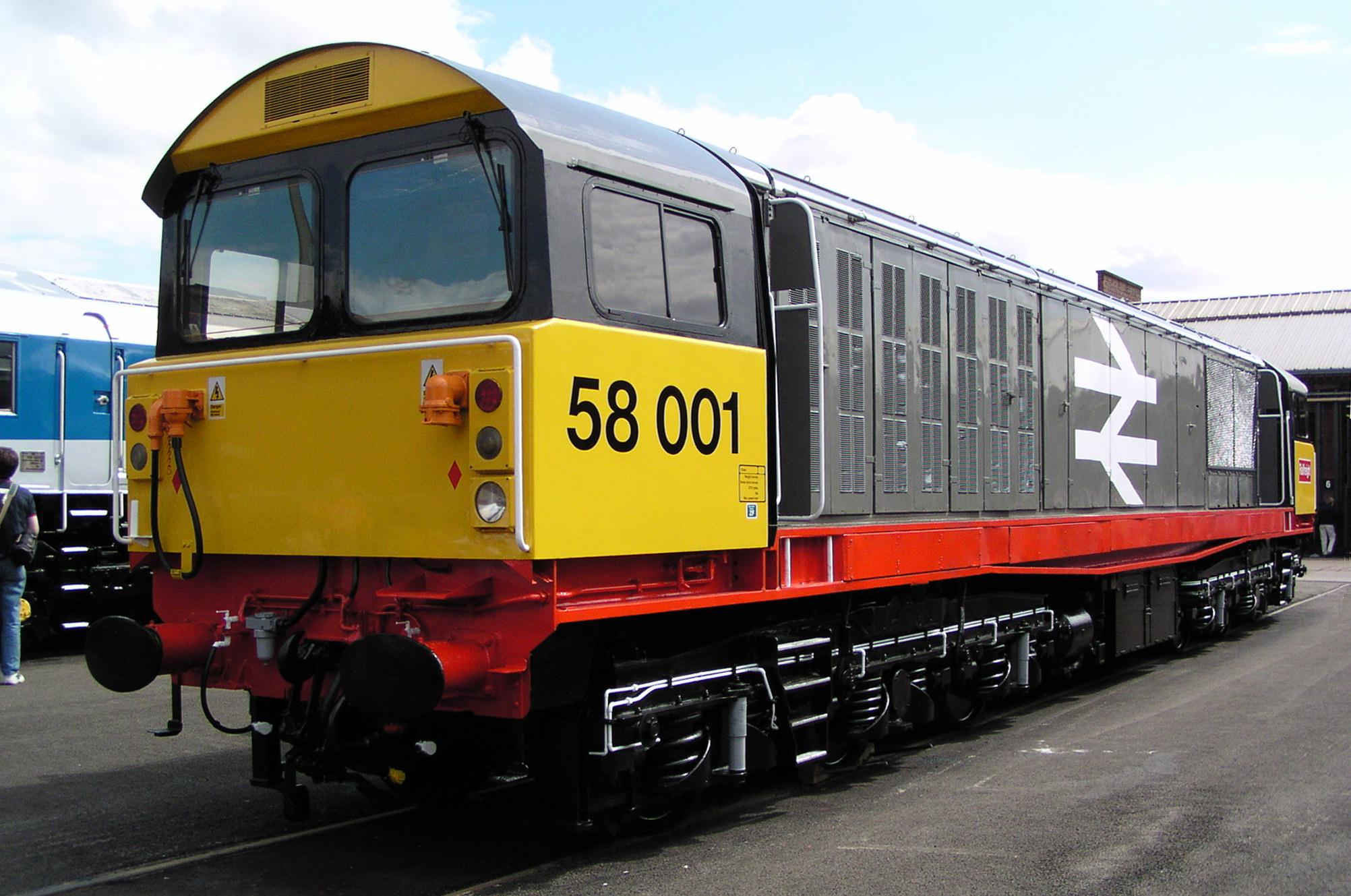
Class 58 (no. 58001) sporting the original Railfreight livery

Railfreight livery, a colour scheme specifically for freight locomotives, was unveiled when Class 58 no. 58001 drove through a plastic screen at Doncaster Works on 9 December 1982. While this livery had much in common with the Large Logo version of Rail Blue livery, including the yellow cabs and larger logo and numbers on the bodyside, the main colour was grey rather than blue. A later version added a red stripe along the lower edge of the locomotive bodyside.

When British Rail operations were divided into sectors in the mid-1980s, prior to privatisation, a new version of the Railfreight livery emerged; Trainload Freight appeared, giving the sectors individual identities. Consisting of three shades of grey and thus known as triple grey Railfreight, the livery included logos on the sides and cabs of locomotives indicating which sector they belonged to. For locomotives used on internal British Rail duties, a separate livery of a plain darker grey was created. This was later modified for locomotives allocated to the Civil Engineer's department to include a yellow stripe on the upper bodyside, the resulting livery being known as Dutch, due to its similarity to the corporate colours of the Nederlandse Spoorwegen.

== Gallery ==
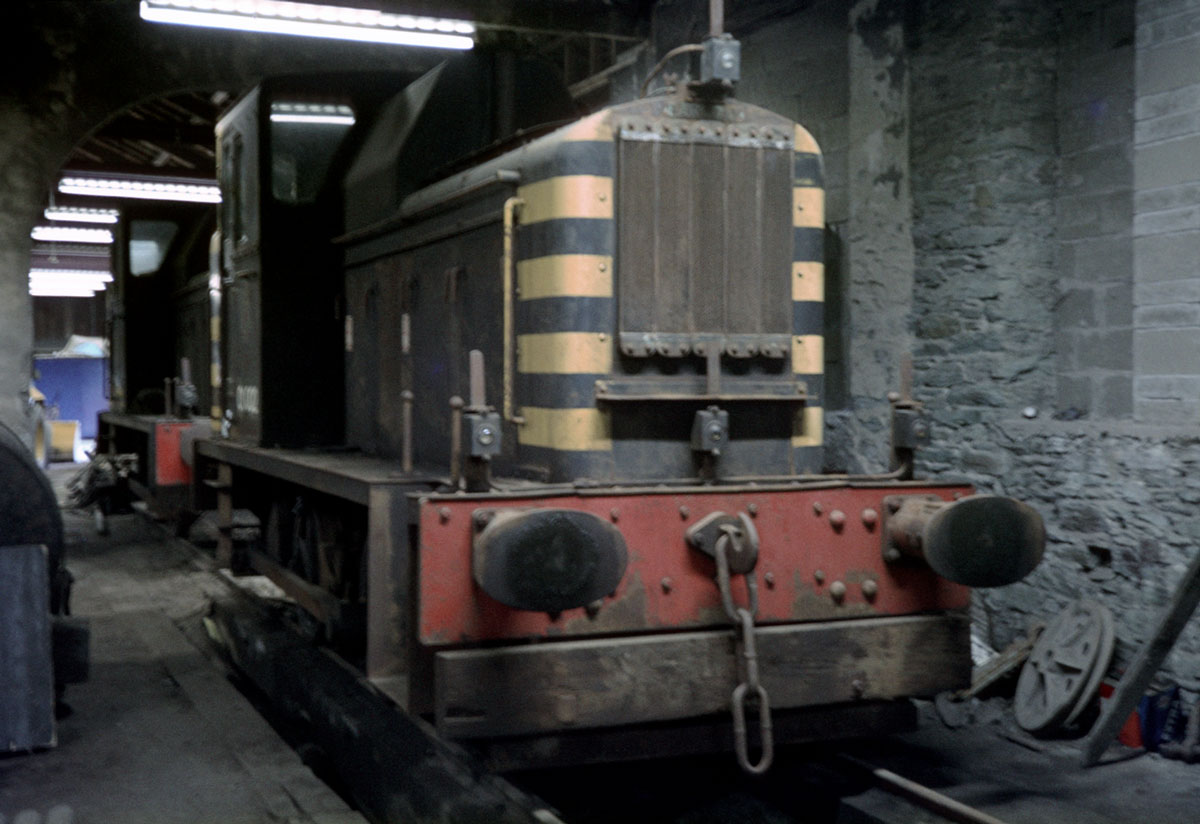
Class 01 (no. 01002) inside Holyhead Breakwater shed in early black livery. Withdrawn no. 01001 is just visible at the rear.

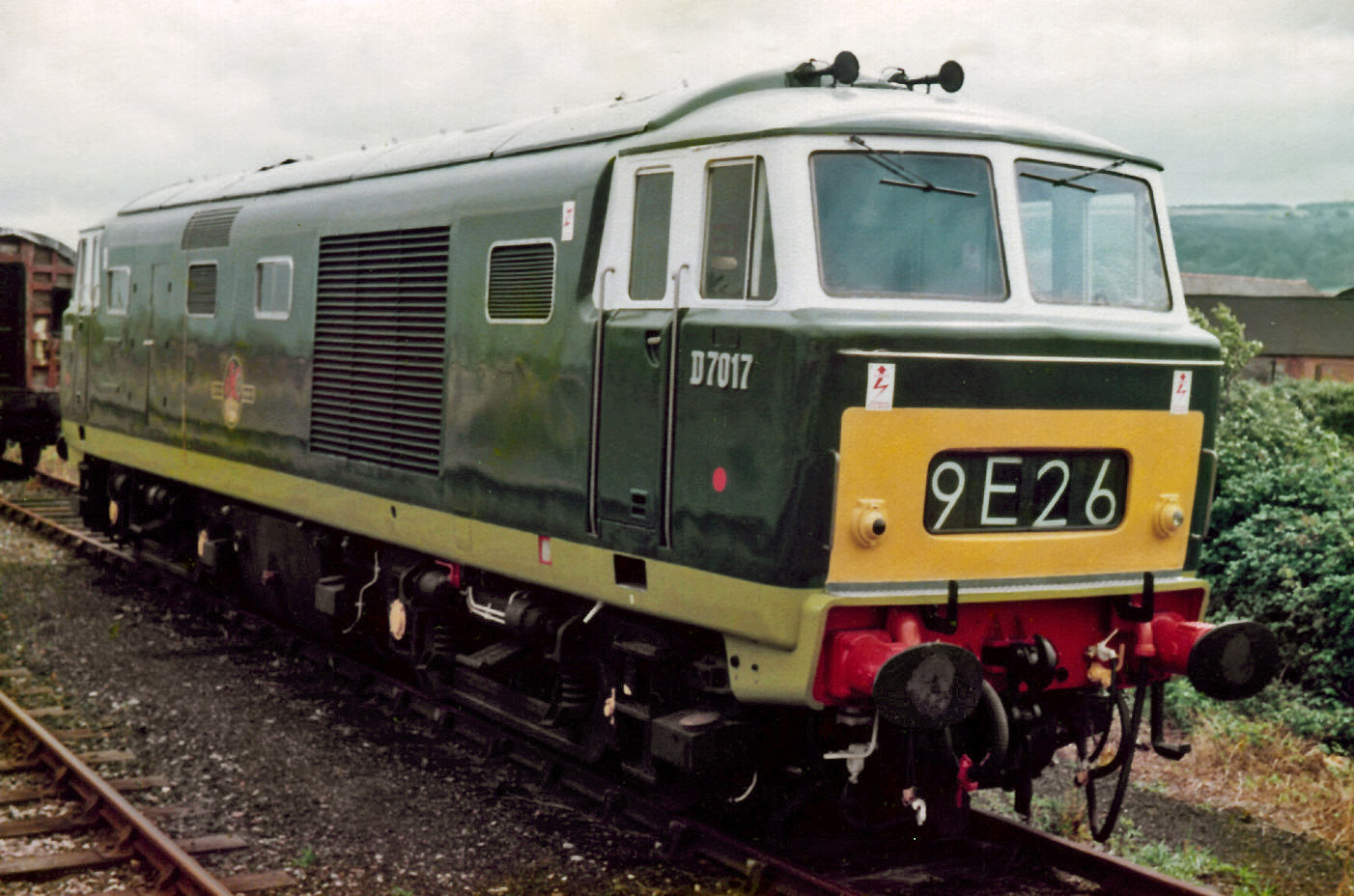
Class 35 Hymek (no. D7017) restored to 1960s green and lime livery

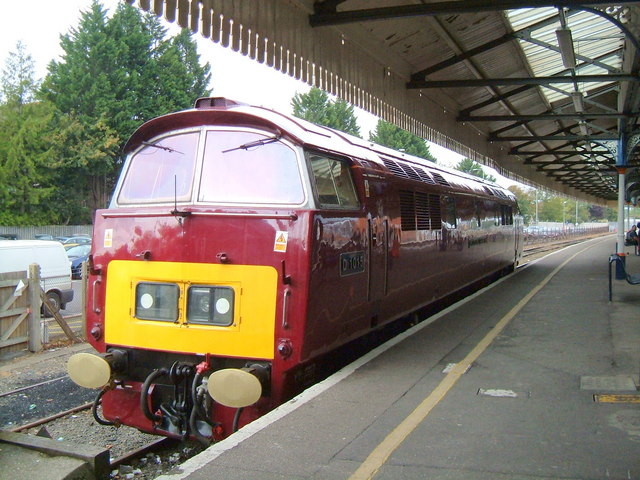
A Class 52 (no. D1015) restored to 1960s Western Region maroon livery

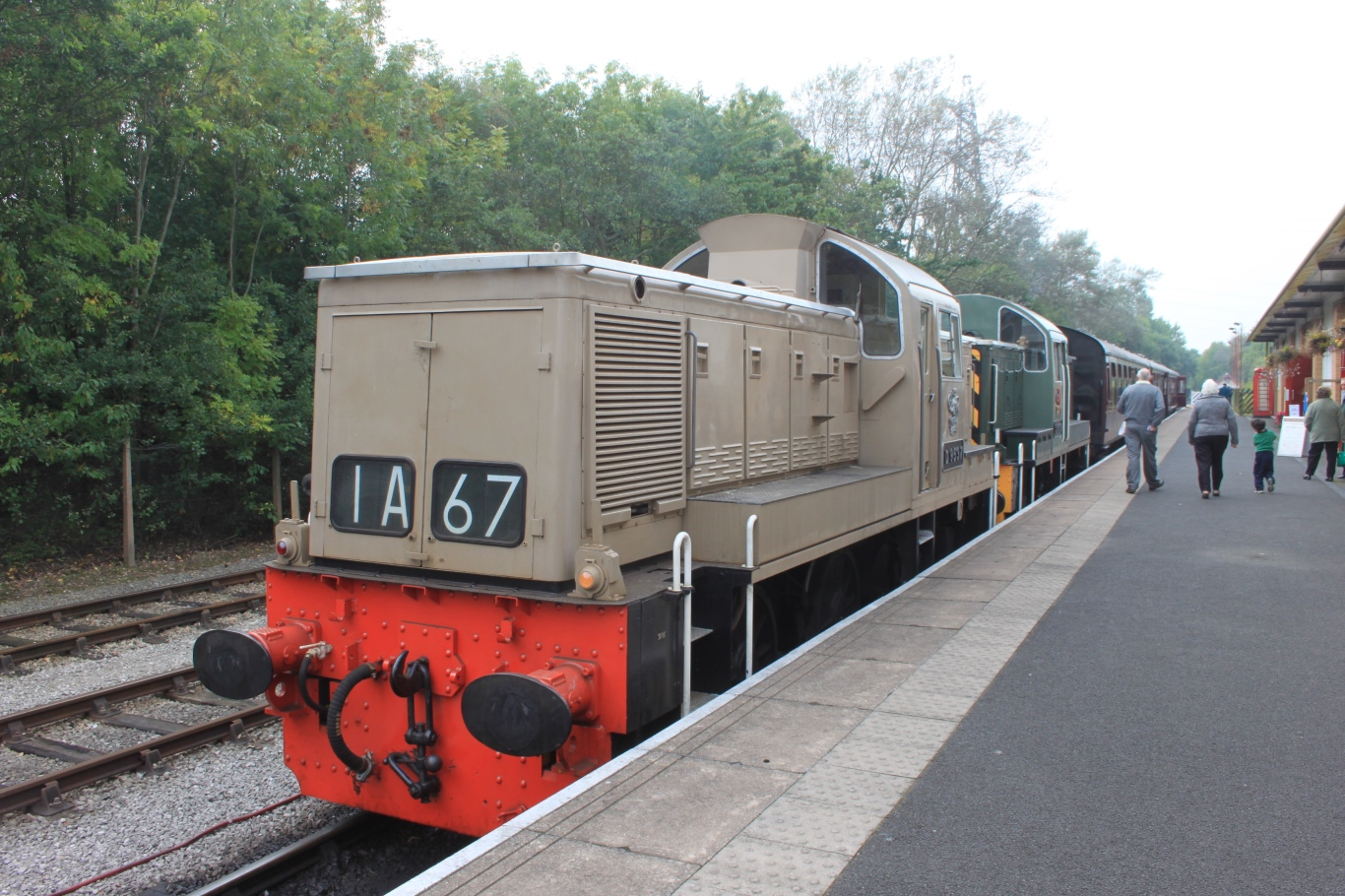
Class 14s (no. D9537) in desert sand livery and no. D9539 prepare a double-head train on the Ribble Steam Railway.

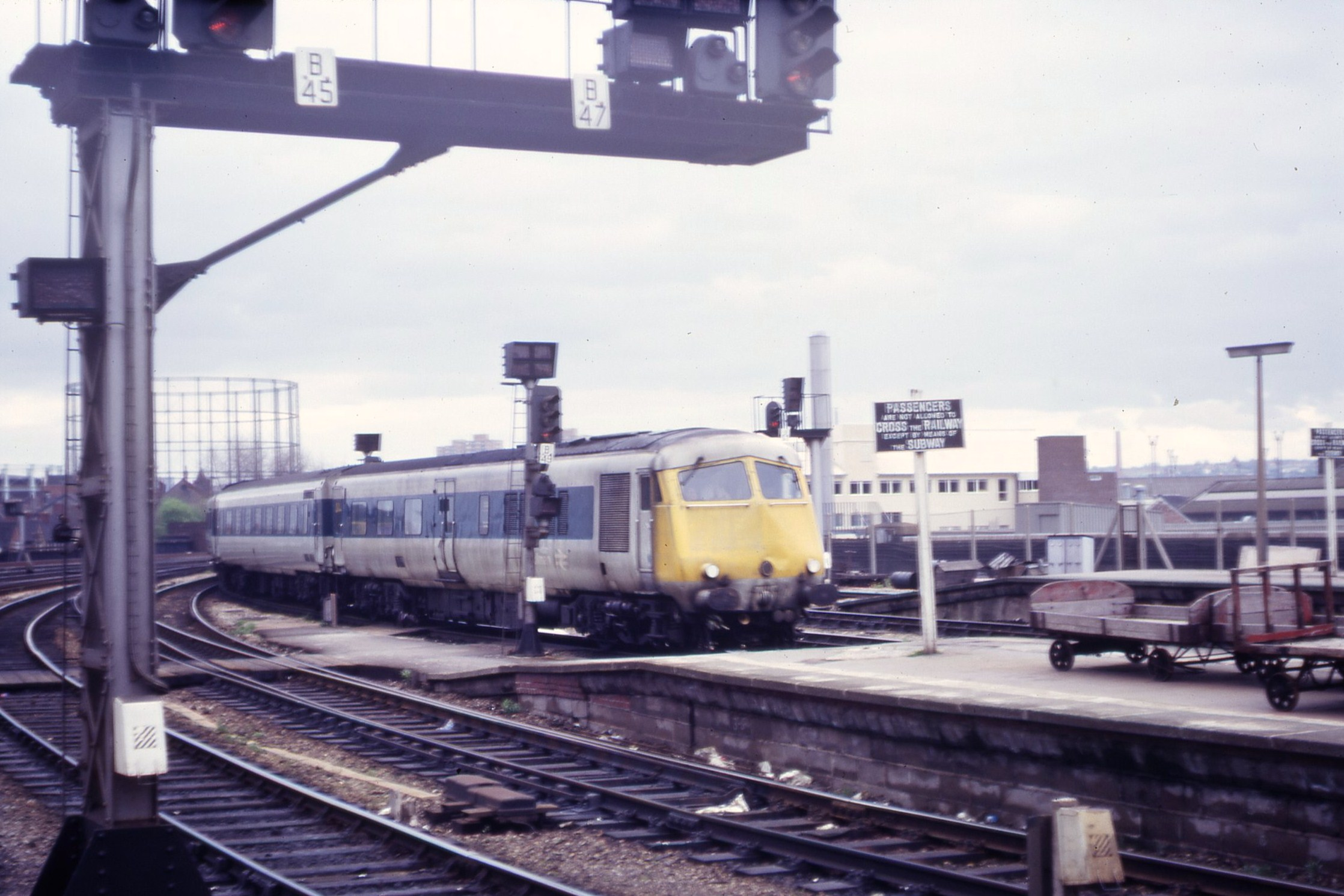
The Blue Pullman in grey and blue livery arriving at Bristol Temple Meads in 1973

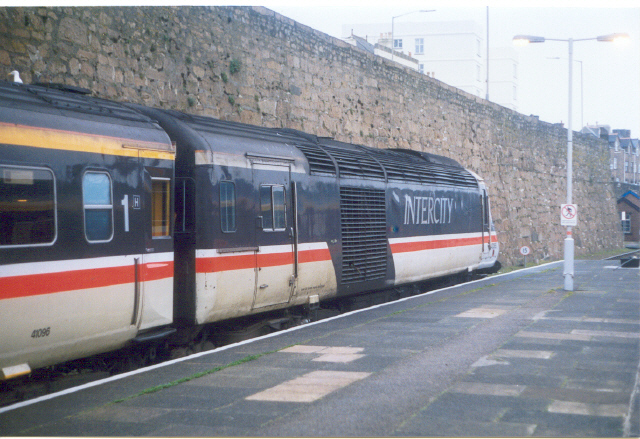
A high speed train power car and coach in InterCity Swallow livery

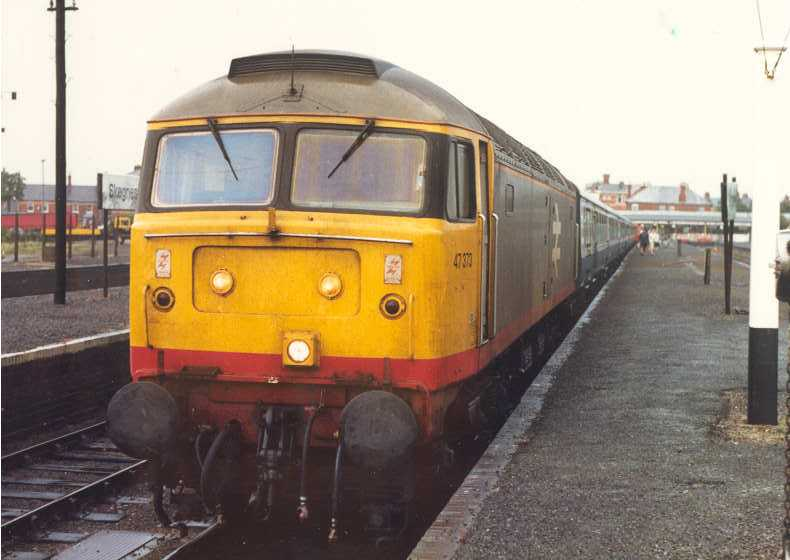
A Class 47 (no. 47373) in revised Railfreight red stripe livery

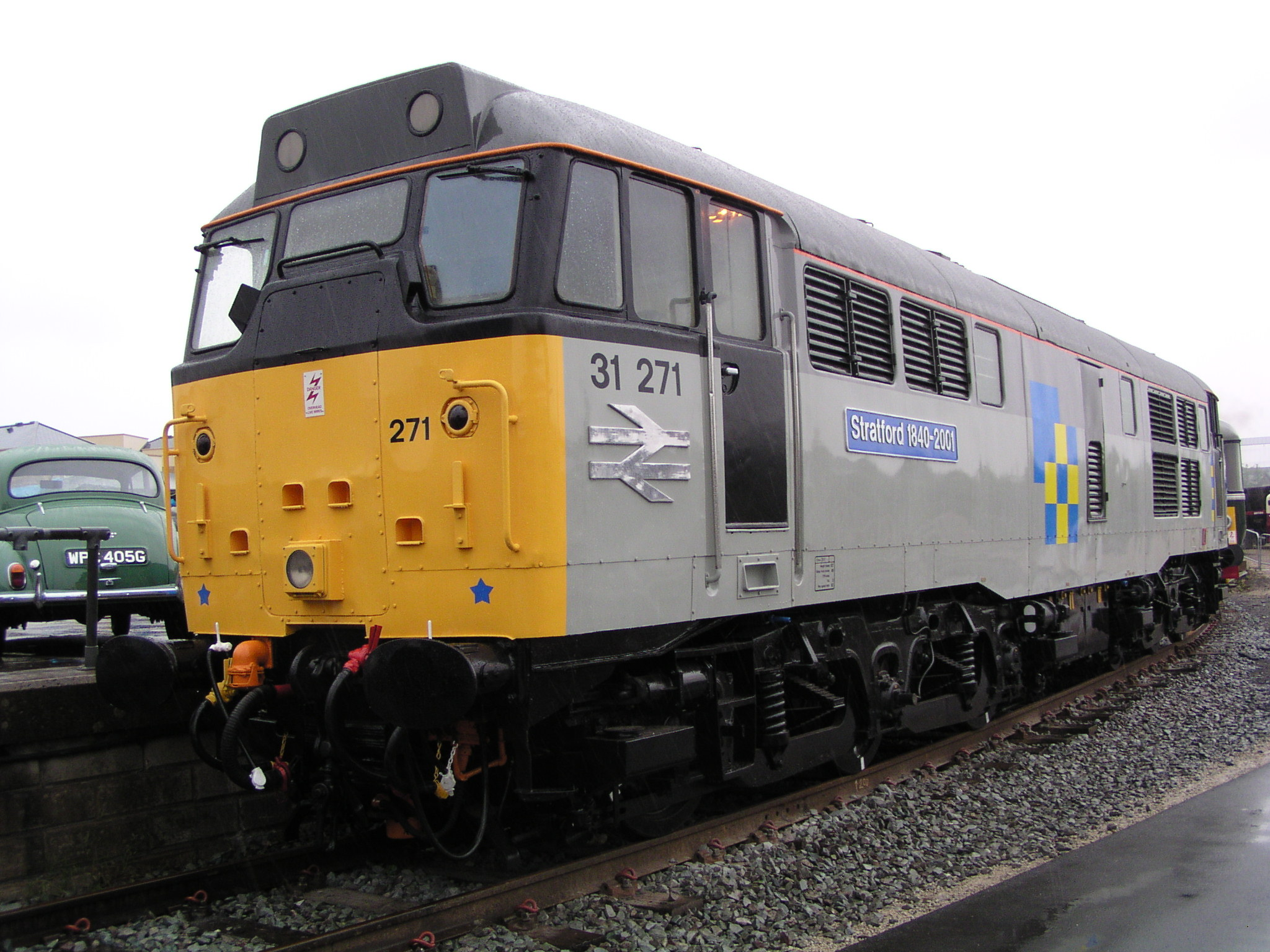
Class 31 (no. 31271) in Railfreight triple grey livery with Construction sector markings

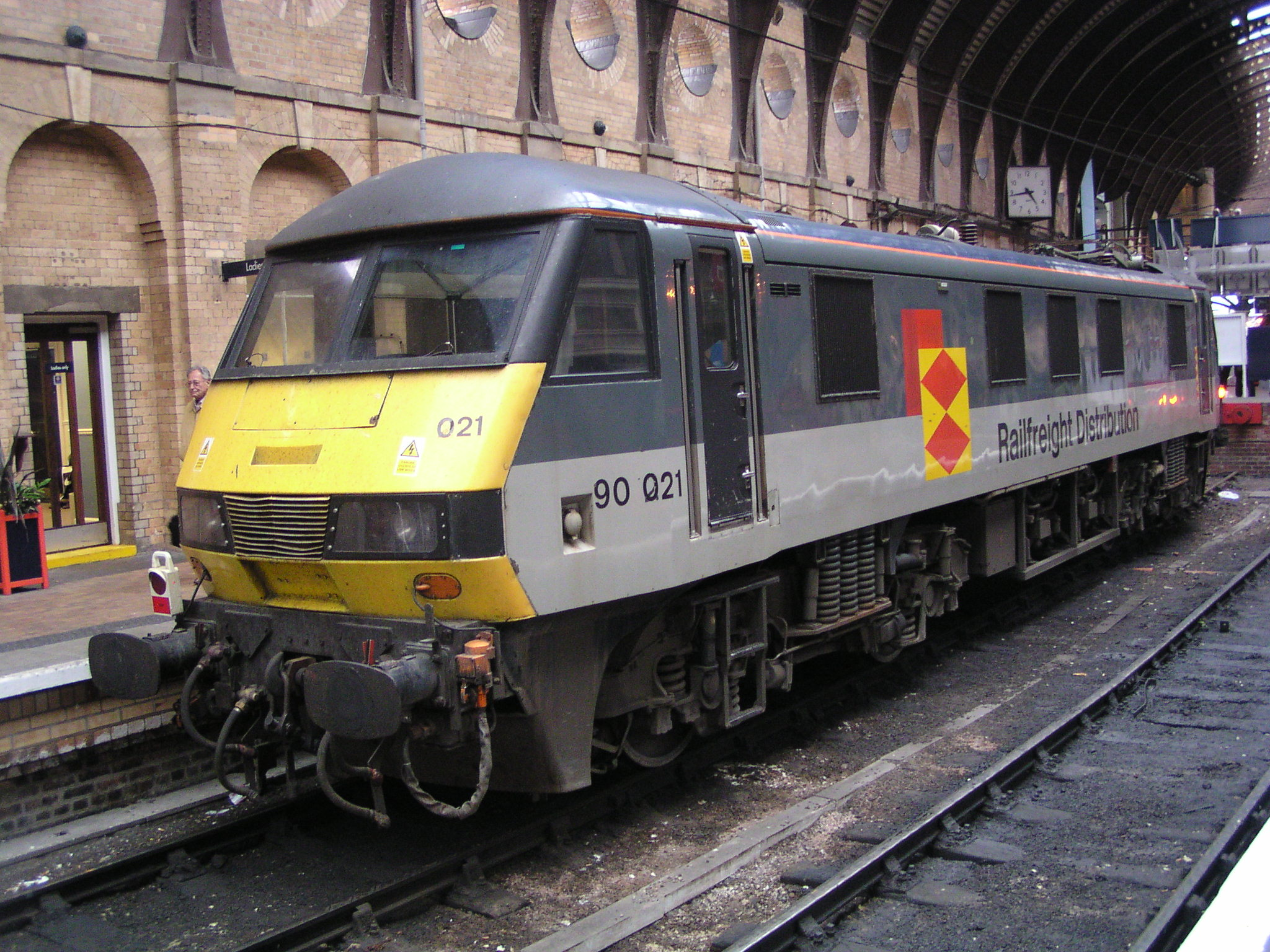
Class 90 (no. 90021) in revised Railfreight triple grey livery, with Railfreight Distribution sector markings

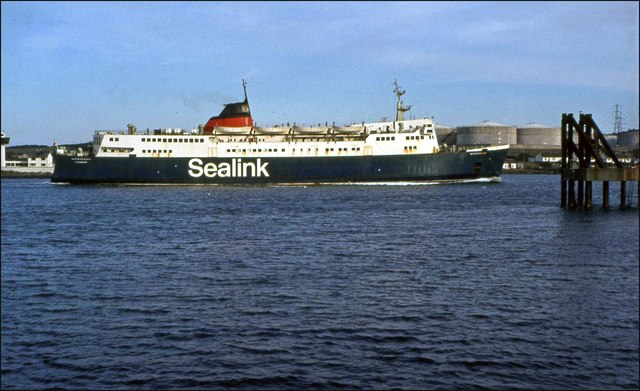
Antrim Princess Sealink ferry underway in Larne with Sealink lettering
