= Bredicot railway station =

Disused railway station in Bredicot, Worcestershire

Bredicot

General information
- Location: Bredicot, Worcestershire; England
- Coordinates: 52.1937°N 2.1396°W
- Grid reference: SO905550

Other information
- Status: Disused

History
- Original company: Birmingham and Gloucester Railway
- Pre-grouping: Midland Railway

Key dates
- November 1845: Opened
- 1 October 1855: Closed
Location

Bredicot railway station served the village of Bredicot, Worcestershire, England, from 1845 to 1855 on the Birmingham and Gloucester Railway.

== History ==
The station was opened in November 1845 by the Birmingham and Gloucester Railway. It closed on 1 October 1855.

Preceding station	Disused railways	Following station
Spetchley	Birmingham and Gloucester Railway	Oddingley
