= Dunhampstead =

Village in Worcestershire, England

Coordinates: 52°14′18″N 2°07′20″W

Dunhampstead is a small village in the English county of Worcestershire. It is located about 6 miles to the north-east of Worcester and around half a mile to the east of the M5.

The Worcester and Birmingham Canal passes through the village where by Bridge 30 there is a boatyard and it passes through Dunhampstead Tunnel.

The main railway line between Birmingham and the south-west of England passes just east of the village. A station existed by the level crossing but closed in the 1950s. The signal box and crossing house have also been removed.

The village public house, The Fir Tree Inn (locally known as The Firs) closed in Autumn 2019, with 2 houses built on its car park. The nearest pub is approximately 1.5 miles down the towpath at Tibberton, at Bridge 25.

There are now no facilities in the hamlet but it remains popular with walkers, cyclists and horse riders.
