= Spetchley railway station =

Former railway station in Worcestershire, England

Spetchley
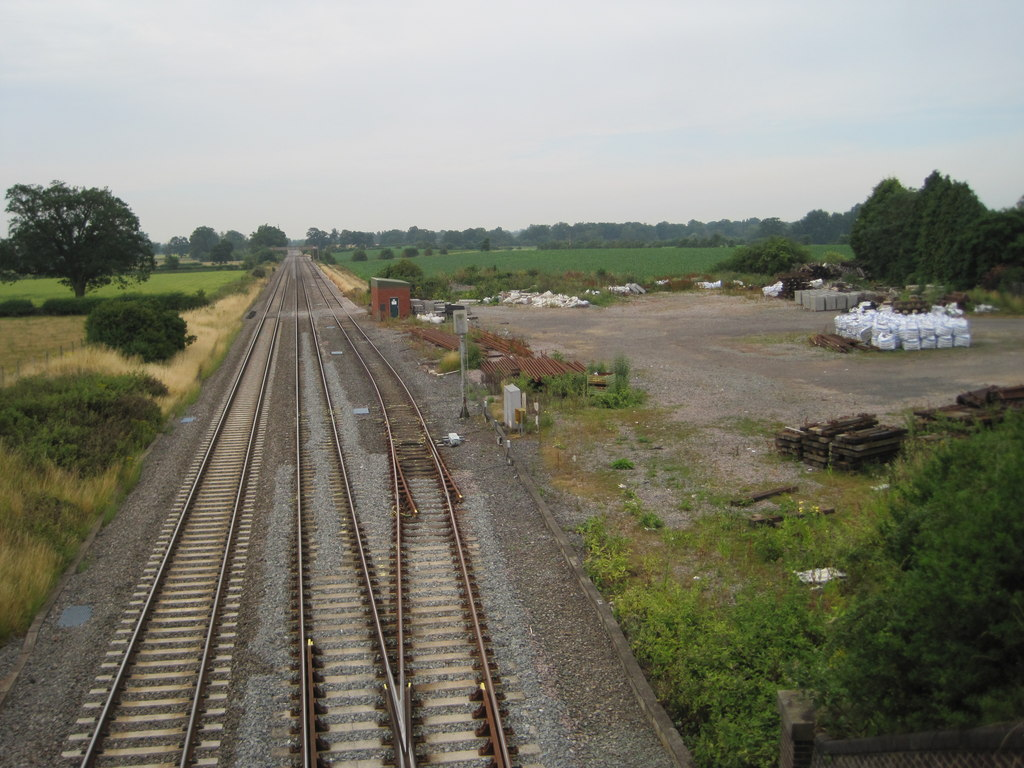
- Station site, looking south. The rightmost of the three tracks is the up goods loop.

General information
- Location: Spetchley, Wychavon, Worcestershire; England
- Coordinates: 52.1812°N 2.1432°W
- Grid reference: SO903536

Other information
- Status: Disused

History
- Original company: Birmingham and Gloucester Railway
- Pre-grouping: Midland Railway
- Post-grouping: London, Midland and Scottish Railway

Key dates
- 24 June 1840: Station opened
- 1 October 1855: Closed to passengers
- 2 January 1961: Closed to goods
Location

Spetchley railway station was an intermediate stop on the Birmingham and Gloucester Railway, opened in 1840. Besides the village of Spetchley, it served the city of Worcester until 1850. It closed to passengers in 1855 but remained open for goods until 1961.

== History ==
The station opened on 24 June 1840 with the original portion of the Birmingham and Gloucester Railway (B&GR), between Bromsgrove and Cheltenham. It was considered to be a "First class" station – all trains called. It was 24 miles 6.91 chains (38.763 km) from Birmingham (Camp Hill), and 66 miles 16 chains (106.5 km) from Derby. The line in this area was on an ascending gradient of 1 in 300 towards Birmingham, but through Spetchley station it was level for 22.68 chains (456 m).

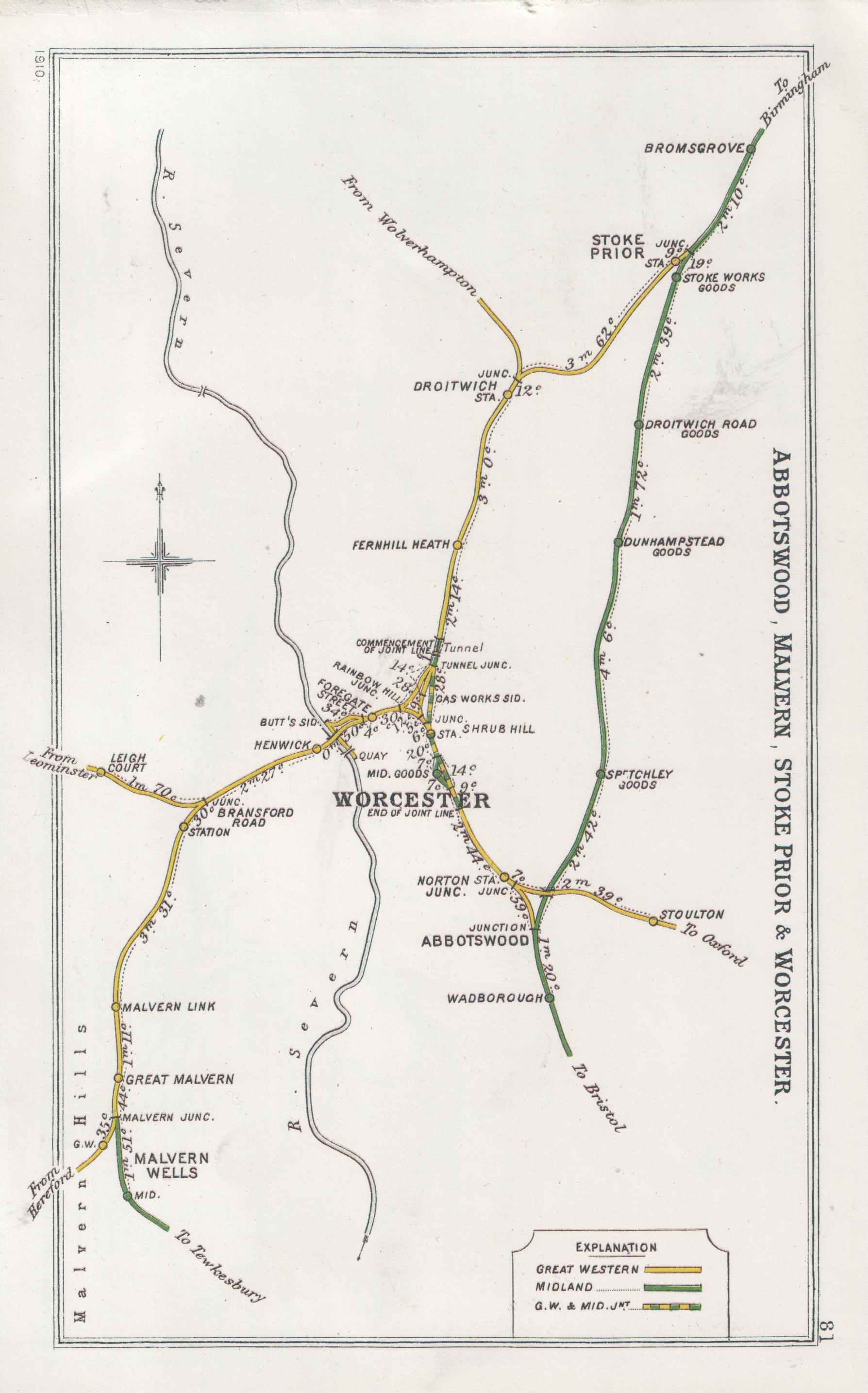
A 1910 Railway Clearing House Junction Diagram showing railways in the vicinity of Spetchley (centre right)

The station buildings originally cost £2,716 but extensions and modifications before opening added a further £572. They were built in the Gothic style. Facilities included offices, houses for some of the staff, stables for ten horses, waiting rooms and a refreshment room. The refreshment room was not operated by the railway, but leased out.

Spetchley was the station for Worcester, but was three miles (4.8 km) to the east of that city; road coaches between Worcester and Spetchley, which connected with every train, were provided at the expense of the B&GR. A coaching office was opened opposite the HopPole in Worcester. Coaches carried 13 passengers, and 40 minutes were allowed for the journey. The coaches proved costly to the B&GR (in 1844, 78,372 passengers were carried at a cost to the B&GR of £2,698), and they drew many complaints.

The B&GR amalgamated with the Bristol and Gloucester Railway early in 1845, forming the Bristol and Birmingham Railway (B&BR); the Midland Railway (MR) leased the B&BR later in 1845 and absorbed it in 1846.

The first section of the Oxford, Worcester and Wolverhampton Railway (OW&WR), between Abbotswood Junction (on the Midland Railway) and Worcester, opened on 5 October 1850. This route was worked by the MR, and the road coaches between Spetchley and Worcester were withdrawn at the same time. This line was extended north to Stoke Prior Junction (also on the MR) on 18 February 1852, and both of these sections of the OW&WR were then treated by the MR as a loop off their main line.

Spetchley station closed to passengers on 1 October 1855. In 1904 it had facilities for handling goods and livestock; it closed to all traffic on 2 January 1961.

As of 2010, an Up Goods Loop still exists at Spetchley, beginning 66 miles 46 chains (107.1 km) and ending 66 miles 12 chains (106.5 km) from Derby (London Road Junction).

Preceding station	Disused railways	Following station
Norton	Birmingham and Gloucester Railway	Bredicot
