= British Rail Warship Class =

British Rail Warship Class may refer to:

- British Rail Class D20/2
- British Rail Class 42
- British Rail Class 43 (Warship Class)
- British Rail Class 22 (Baby Warship)
