= Western Courier =

Western Courier may refer to:

- The Western Courier, the school newspaper at Western Illinois University
- a British Rail Class 52 locomotive, D1062, Western Courier
