= Ealing rail crash =

1973 rail accident in west London

Coordinates: 51.51418°N 0.30929°W

Details
- Date: 19 December 1973
- Location: Ealing, London
- Country: United Kingdom
- Line: Great Western Main Line
- Operator: British Rail
- Cause: unlocked battery box

Statistics
- Trains: 1
- Passengers: approx 650
- Deaths: 10
- Injured: 94
Location within Greater London

The Ealing rail crash was an accident on the British railway system that occurred on 19 December 1973. The 17:18 express train from London Paddington to Oxford—with approximately 650 passengers on board—was derailed while travelling at around 70 mph (110 km/h) between Ealing Broadway and West Ealing. Ten passengers were killed and 94 were injured, and it was Britain's deadliest train crash of the decade until the Moorgate tube crash which killed 45. The cause of the accident was an unsecured maintenance door that had fallen open whilst the train was travelling, after having struck several lineside objects, it struck a points machine at Longfield Avenue, derailing the entire train.

== Sequence of events ==
=== Locomotive design ===
The train involved in the accident was hauled by Class 52 diesel-hydraulic no. 1007 Western Talisman, which had been manufactured in 1962 and was based at Laira Depot, where it had run an estimated 950,000 miles since its entry into service. Like all engines, the Class 52 featured several lead-acid batteries primarily to pre-heat and start the two engines. The Class 52's batteries were located in four different containers on the engine between the bogies. To protect the batteries from damage whilst the train was running, the battery chambers were sealed with a 44.5 in (1,130 mm) door, which was originally designed in use on the similar Class 42. The door would lock in position whilst the train was running via carriage-locks that would be activated by a square-key, but the Class 52 had an additional feature in the form of a pear-shaped metal catch known as the "pear-drop". This would catch the battery box door in case the carriage-locks failed to engage, which had happened on the Class 42 before. When a Class 52 had its batteries examined, the standard procedure would be to replace the batteries in the chamber before locking the carriage-locks and then the pear-drop before the train would be allowed to leave.

=== Repairs at Old Oak Common ===
Two days previously, on 17 December 1973, Western Talisman had been the locomotive on the 05:45 Plymouth-Paddington service and had run normally as far as Reading where one of the locomotive's two engines broke down, resulting in another locomotive taking over the train to Paddington. At Paddington, Western Talisman was stored until the afternoon of 18 December, when the engine was worked light to Old Oak Common Depot for maintenance to be carried out to fix the problem. The engine arrived at Old Oak in the late evening, and was put under the control of maintenance staff. At around 22:00, engineer C.O. Pitter was directed to charge the batteries of the locomotive, to do which he opened a battery box door and plugged in the charging wire. Owing to some difficulty in getting the battery box door to open, Pitter was forced to raise the "pear-drop" lock before he could open the carriage-locks; he left the catch in this open position when he finished duty at 06:30 on 19 December, having found the engine to be still on charge.

At some time between 06:30 and just after 07:00, Shift Supervisor L. Wiggins came to discuss matters and found that somebody had closed the battery box door. At this time such an event was usual, and when Pitter put the locomotive on charge he had run the wires underneath the locomotive's skirting, so that they were unaffected by the doors, which due to the cramped conditions of Old Oak's maintenance area, were often shut to save room. At no point after Wiggins' visit did anybody either re-open or lock the battery box doors until 12:00, when Wiggins' assistant G. Abbas arranged to have the locomotive moved outside for engine testing. Abbas told the engineers in charge of the engine to "box it up", which meant that the locomotive was to have any and all overhanging doors shut and locked for movement, which included the battery box doors, that were now under the control of Engineer F. Ashley, who had not had reason to examine Western Talisman until Abbas told him to. Ashley correctly removed the wires and took the locomotive off charge, but believing the doors to be locked already, failed to examine the battery box doors and left them in the unlocked position with the "pear-drop" still raised. Abbas failed to examine his work. As such, the engine was moved out of the maintenance shed with the door open.

At 14:00, Western Talisman was released from repairs and was scheduled to haul an Empty Stock train to Paddington, before it would then run the 17:18 Paddington-Oxford service, and was driven from Old Oak Common to Paddington by Driver T.D. Owen and Secondman R.P. Woodnaugh, both stationed at Old Oak Common. Under the standard arrangements, Owen examined the engine before taking it to Paddington but failed to notice the unsecured door, primarily as his main responsibility when examining the locomotive was to check the train heaters, make sure the locomotive was set to run off its batteries, and to make sure no pipes or wires were still attached.

== Derailment ==
=== Journey to Longfield Avenue ===
At Paddington, No. 1007 Western Talisman formed the 17:18 Oxford service, 1A82 that consisted of eleven coaches, comprising two Corridor Second coaches, a Corridor First, two Corridor Composite coaches, a Brake Corridor Composite and five additional Corridor Seconds, with the crew consisting of Driver Owen, Secondman Woolnough and Guard J. Wells. Owing to the large number of passengers boarding, the train departed Paddington late at 17:29, running on clear signals all the way to Longfield Avenue, the train was travelling at 70 mph (110 km/h) at the time of the derailment.

At some point on the journey before the train passed Old Oak Common, the unsecured battery box door fell open and projected outside of the loading gauge of the train, allowing it to strike objects close to the line. Later investigations examining the route that 1A82 took found that the projecting door had caused damage to lineside equipment and structures at Old Oak Common and at Acton Main Line, although none of the crew or passengers reported feeling anything unusual between these areas. However, as the train passed through Ealing Broadway, the projecting door struck the platform ramp heavily and caused notable damage to the Down Main platform, dislodging several coping stones on the platform. The impact damaged the battery box door to the point that the hinges had broken, allowing the door to fall beyond its limit, now dangerously close to the ground. This impact was felt and heard by several witnesses, including Driver Owen and Secondman Woodnaugh, who both believed at the time that the engine had simply crossed over a bad rail joint and decided that they would report it at Reading.

=== Crash ===
With the signals being clear for 1A82 and there being no sign of anything wrong, the train was still running at full speed as it approached Longfield Avenue, at which a crossover was placed to allow trains to cross from the Down Main Line to the Down Relief line in the area controlled by the Signalbox at Old Oak Common, which controlled the points by sending an electrical signal to the switch motor. On the day of the accident, the crossover had not been used and was set for 1A82 to remain on the Down Main Line, but owing to the damage sustained by the door at Ealing Broadway, the door was in such a position that when the locomotive passed the motor, it hit the motor with some force, which forcibly changed the points and derailed the train, with the rear bogie of the engine taking the crossover whilst the front bogie remained on the main line.

Western Talisman was thrown onto its right side, skidding down the track in roughly a straight line for 210 yd (190 m), blocking both the Up and Down Main line. The first coach was totally derailed but remained upright and followed the locomotive with minor damage to rear of the right side of the coach, as the second coach had swung 90° to the right of the coach and fallen onto this side, blocking all the lines, with this action causing the next three coaches to jackknife, with severe damage being sustained by the fourth coach, including a bogie from the third coach crashing into the coach, which is believed to have caused the majority of the serious injuries and fatalities. The fronts of the third, fifth and sixth coach in addition to the rear of the fourth coach had all crashed into the cutting on the side of the line and sustained moderate damage. The remaining coaches were all derailed, but remained in line and suffered only minor damage, with the rear of the train coming to a stand just past the damaged points motor, whilst lying between it was the battery box door that had been torn off by the impact with the motor.

In the minutes after the derailment, both Secondman Woodnaugh and Driver Owen freed themselves from their derailed cab and carried out track protection by calling Old Oak Common on a Signal Telephone, at which point the Signalman, who had suspected a derailment when his instruments showed that all the lines in the area were blocked even though 1A82 was the only train in the area, called emergency services at 17:39. The police arrived at the scene at 17:44 with the ambulance and fire brigade arriving shortly afterwards, with recovery work continuing late into the night. In the meantime, with a major railway mainline having been totally blocked, British Rail arranged for trains to be either be terminated at Reading, or would be diverted between West Ealing and Old Oak Common via the Greenford branch line and the Acton–Northolt Line, which was used until 18:45 on 20 December 1973, when the Relief lines were opened, which were used for traffic until the Main lines were repaired and re-opened on 28 December, though the removal of speed restrictions took until 2 January 1974.

== Victims ==
Ten passengers were killed and 94 were injured. Of the injuries and fatalities, it was believed that the majority of the serious injuries and deaths occurred in the fourth coach when a derailed bogie crashed into the body of the coach near the front of the coach during the derailment.

== Accident report ==
A report into the accident and its causes was written by Colonel Ian McNaughton and published in September 1974 which discussed the causes of the accident and how to prevent a re-occurrence of it. His report considered that the primary fault of the accident was due to poor working procedures at Old Oak Common's maintenance area, with the fact that somebody (it was never determined who or when) closed the battery box door without securing it, or notifying the Electrical Engineer. Engineer Pitter was criticized for locking the pear-drop in the raised position, even after he had opened the door but the main blame for the accident was laid with Engineer Ashley, who failed to examine the door's two locks prior to the engine's departure under the inexcusable belief that since the locomotive doors appeared secure, it meant that the locomotive would not require any examination. Similarly, Mr. Abbas who asked for the locomotive to be "boxed up" was also criticized to a lesser degree for the fact that he did not examine the locomotive and wholly took Ashley's word on the matter. Driver Owen was not required to examine the battery box doors, and as such he was not criticized for failing to see the unsecured door. It was also noted that the primary error that caused the accident, Pitter's decision to secure the pear-drop, was caused by the fact that engineers at Plymouth had, without permission, made it so the pear-drop could be screwed into the raised position, which McNaughton believed was, although well-intentioned, unnecessary and could lead to instances such as this.

Owing to the investigation into the accident, the safety catch on the Class 52s was re-designed and replaced on all locomotives of the class by August 1974.
