= British Rail Class 52 =

Class of 74 C-C diesel-hydraulic locomotives

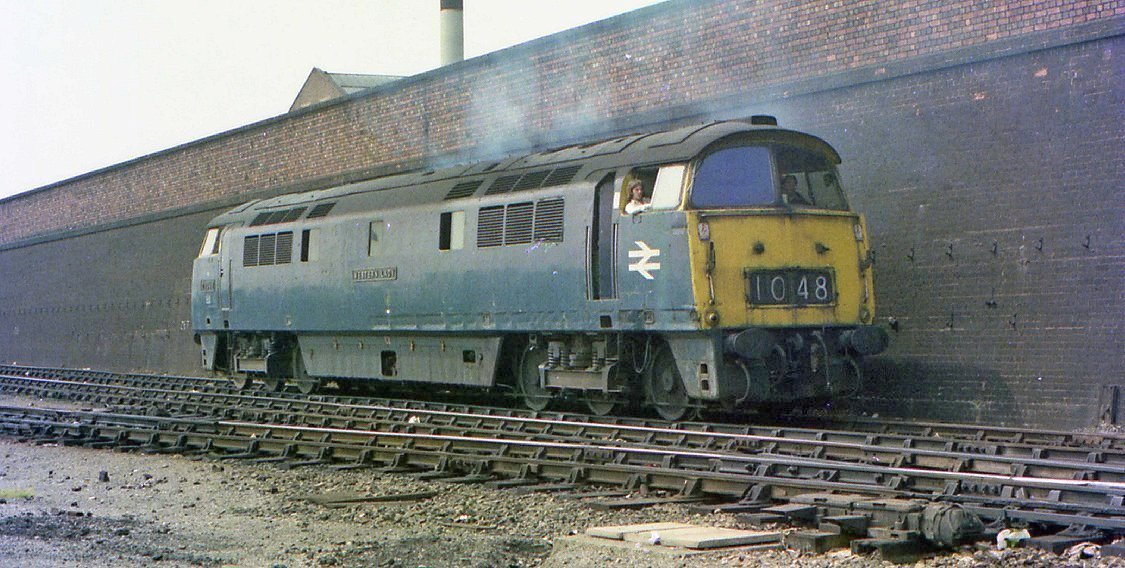
- D1048 "Western Lady" at Old Oak Common TMD in 1976.
Type and origin
- Power type: Diesel-hydraulic
- Builder: Swindon Works (30); Crewe Works (44)
- Build date: 1961–1964
- Total produced: 74
Specifications
- Configuration
  - UIC: C′C′
  - Commonwealth: C-C
- Gauge: 4 ft 8 1/2 in (1,435 mm) standard gauge
- Wheel diameter: 3 ft 7 in (1.092 m)
- Minimum curve: 4.5 chains (300 ft; 91 m)
- Wheelbase: 54 ft 8 in (16.66 m)
- Length: 68 ft 0 in (20.73 m)
- Width: 8 ft 8 in (2.64 m)
- Height: 12 ft 11 3/4 in (3.96 m)
- Loco weight: 108 long tons (110 t; 121 short tons)
- Fuel capacity: 850 imp gal (3,900 L; 1,020 US gal)
- Prime mover: 2 × Maybach MD655 (64.5 L or 3,940 cu in)
- Transmission: Hydraulic
- MU working: Not fitted
- Train heating: Steam
- Train brakes: Vacuum; later Dual (Air and Vacuum)
Performance figures
- Maximum speed: 90 mph (140 km/h)
- Power output: Engines: 1,350 bhp (1,007 kW) at 1,500 rpm × 2 At rail: 2,000 hp (1,491 kW)
- Tractive effort: Maximum: 66,700 lbf (297 kN); Continuous: 45,200 lbf (201 kN)@ 14.5 mph (23.3 km/h)
- Brakeforce: 50 long tons-force (498 kN)
Career
- Operators: Western Region of British Railways
- Numbers: D1000–D1073
- Nicknames: Westerns, Wizzos, Thousands.
- Axle load class: Route availability 7
- Withdrawn: 1973–1977
- Disposition: 7 preserved, remainder scrapped

The British Rail Class 52 is a class of 74 Type 4 diesel-hydraulic locomotives built for the Western Region of British Railways between 1961 and 1964. All were given two-word names, the first word being "Western" and thus the type became known as Westerns. They were also known as Wizzos and Thousands. The final Class 52 locomotives were withdrawn from service in 1977.

== Historical context ==
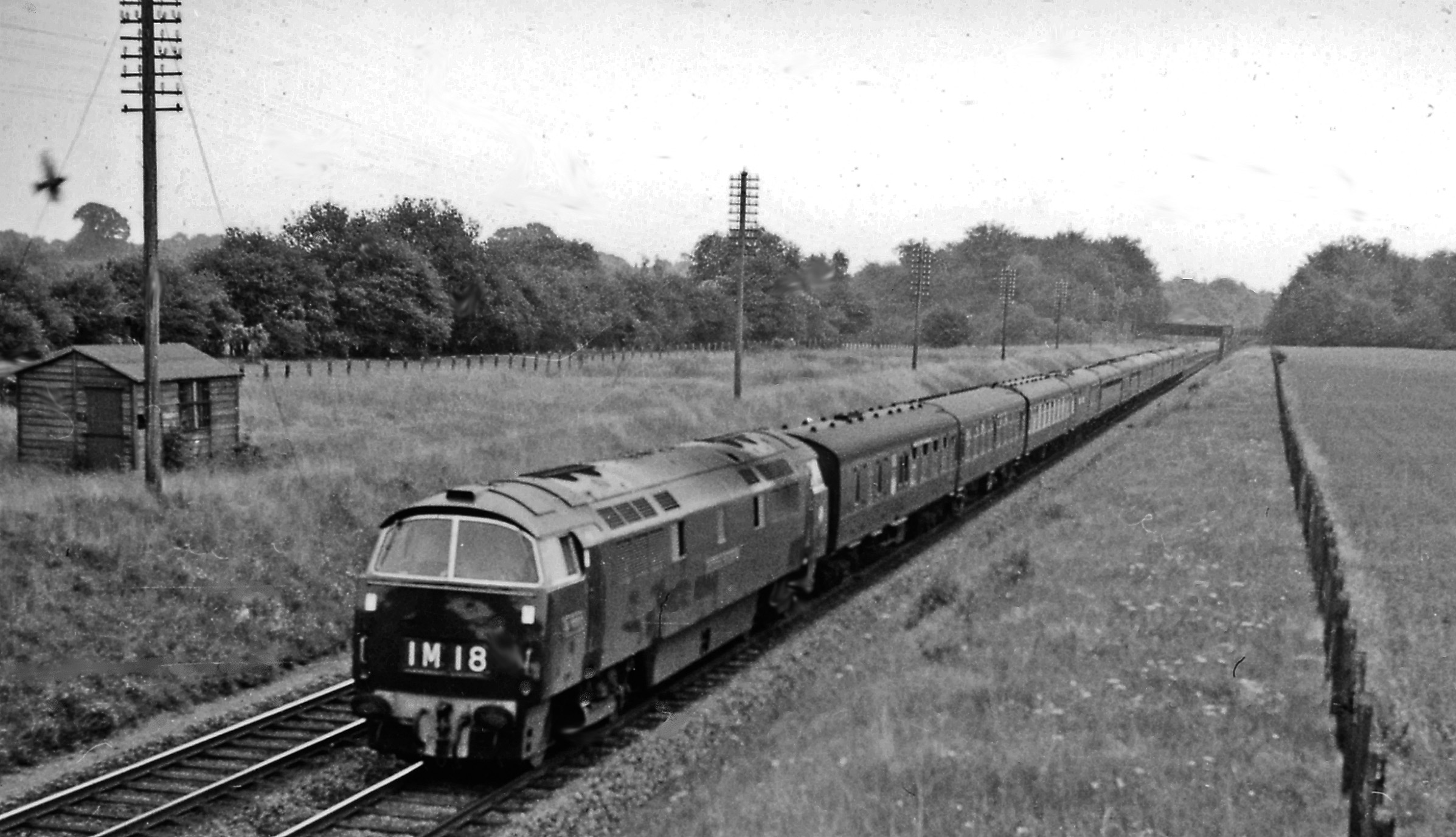
An early photo of D1005 Western Venturer in 1962.

When switching to diesel traction as part of the Modernisation Plan of the 1950s, British Railways (BR) designed, and commissioned designs for, a large number of locomotive types. At this time BR's regions had a high degree of autonomy, which extended as far as classes of locomotives ordered and even the design criteria for those locomotives. Whilst almost all other diesel locomotives were diesel-electric, the Western Region employed a policy of using diesel-hydraulic traction, originally commissioning three classes of main line locomotives: a type 2 and two type 4s (later designations Class 22, Class 41 and Class 42). With pressure to increase the speed of the transition from steam to diesel, volume orders for the Class 22 and Class 42 (along with a similar design Class 43) followed in 1957, a mere two years after the original orders and well before any idea of performance or reliability could be gained.

At the same time it was realised that all the existing orders (diesel-electric and diesel-hydraulic) were for types 1, 2 and 4; thus orders were placed for 101 Type 3 diesel-hydraulics (later Class 35). However the increasing demands for more powerful locomotives prompted a further order, in 1961, for 74 diesel-hydraulics of 2,700 hp (2,000 kW); so when the first locomotive was outshopped from Swindon Works in December 1961, less than a year after the order was placed, the Westerns were born.

The theoretical advantage of diesel-hydraulic was simple: it resulted in a lighter locomotive than equivalent diesel-electric transmission. This provided a better power/weight ratio and decreased track wear. Unfortunately, it had several key disadvantages.

The technology was proven in continental Europe, particularly Germany, but was new to the UK. At the time, it was considered politically unacceptable for the UK government to order railway rolling stock from foreign companies, especially German companies so soon after the Second World War. This resulted in most of the engines and transmissions being manufactured in the United Kingdom under licence from the German manufacturers.

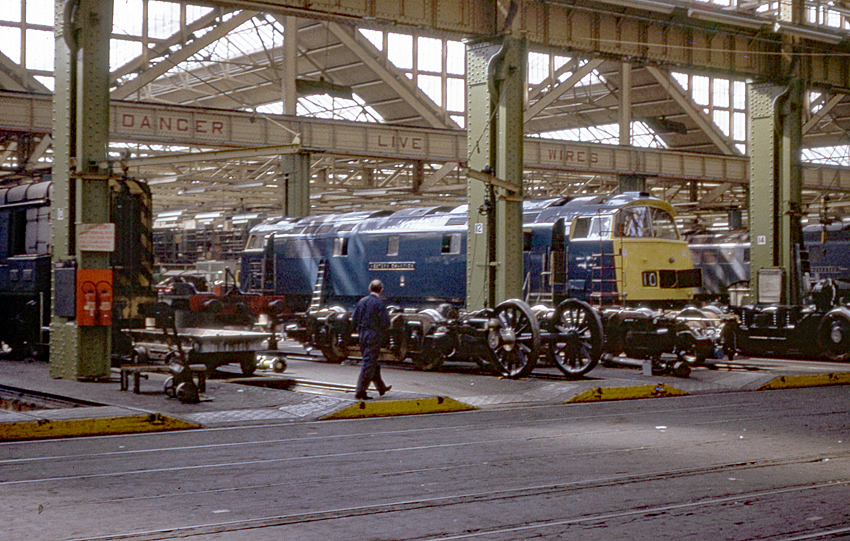
D1015 Western Champion in Swindon Works

Experience showed that the Bristol-Siddeley-Maybach engines were superior to those made by North British Locomotive Company-MAN and although the use of twin engines in the same locomotive was new, the design did not produce any insurmountable problems. In the end the diesel-hydraulic experiment foundered on low fleet numbers, poor maintenance conditions and design issues; not on its German heritage or development of a novel configuration. BR's Swindon Works maintained all the diesel-hydraulic locomotives, and their early demise resulted in a much reduced workload and hastened its eventual closure in 1986.

== The Western ==
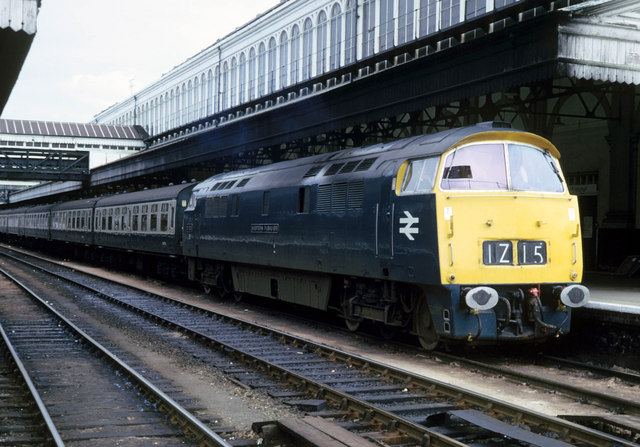
D1023 Western Fusilier at Exeter St Davids with a train for the South West

With the Hymeks and Warships already in service but proving underpowered for top-link services, BR Western Region needed a high-powered locomotive for these trains – the Western therefore needed two diesel engines to achieve the required power output. In keeping with their policy, a new locomotive with a hydraulic transmission was envisaged. Experience had shown that the Maybach engines in the Hymeks were superior to the earlier Maybach and MAN engines used in the Warships, particularly in power output. Also Maybach were able to offer their MD655 engines (an intercooled version of the MD650 used in Class 42) rated at 1,350 bhp (1,010 kW) allied to a Voith L630rV transmission; a Mekydro transmission designed to handle such power could not be fitted into the British loading gauge.

Prototypes sited the engines behind the driving cabs but drivers found this too noisy; moving the engines centrally meant making the locomotive heavier, removing some of the design's advantage. In operational use, the dual-engine arrangement turned out to have some advantages: in particular, the Westerns were able to continue operating with a single engine running in situations where more conventional single-engine designs would require rescue by another locomotive.

The most serious continual problem with the class was a mismatch between the Maybach MD655 engines and the Voith L630rV three speed hydraulic transmissions, a design fault. The top gear ratio in the transmission was too high for the torque characteristics of the engine: the result was that a single locomotive could struggle to reach its claimed 90 mph (140 km/h) top speed in the absence of down grades, more so when work-weary and due for overhaul. This factor, the South Devon Banks (a major part of their running grounds) and the deleterious effect on worn-out engines, all contributed against the Westerns continuing in top-line service. With fifty Class 50 locomotives becoming available following completion of the West Coast Main Line electrification, and new High Speed Trains, the speed and comfort increases the Western Region sought could be achieved and the Westerns dispensed with. Towards the end of their careers, the Westerns were all allocated to Laira (Plymouth).

== Competition and comfort ==
Distribution of locomotives, July 1967
British Rail Class 52 is located in Southern England
Code	Name	Quantity
82A	Bristol Bath Road	15
84A	Laira	59
Total:		74

Whilst the design was largely successful, the working life of the class was relatively short. Its non-standard design added to its maintenance costs at a time when national British Rail policy was moving away from diesel-hydraulics. When the Westerns were introduced in 1962, the Western Region had 226 diesel-hydraulics and 10 diesel-electrics (excluding shunters); by 1966, the numbers were 345 and 269 respectively. As a result, the early 1970s saw the decision taken to retire all the diesel-hydraulic types. Class 46s and Class 47s took over passengers and heavy freight, Class 31s and Class 37s took over light passengers and freight, and Class 25s covered the lighter duties. Following completion of the electrification of the West Coast Main Line throughout from London Euston to Glasgow Central, the Class 50s were reallocated to the Western Region; the introduction of High Speed Trains three years later was the final nail in the coffin for the Class 52 Westerns.

In 1968–69, the Westerns received train air brake equipment in addition to their vacuum exhausters, thus significantly extending their working lives, unlike the similar but lower-powered, Warship class. Four of the class (D1017–D1020) did not receive dual brakes, with these locomotives being among the first withdrawals. The vacuum brake equipment was retained and to fit the additional equipment, it was necessary to remove one of the fuel tanks. However, as with the Warships, it proved impossible to equip them with electric train heating (ETH, or head-end power in US terminology). The Western Region faced particularly stiff competition for its prime inter-city services in the mid to late 1970s from the M4 motorway and it was generally felt within BR that significant speed and comfort improvements on the prime London Paddington-Bristol route were necessary. The lack of ETH meant the Westerns could not power the newly introduced air-conditioned BR Mark 2d/e/f coaches – a shortcoming that classes 47 and 50, equipped with ETH (the latter from new), did not share.

== Performance ==
The Westerns' highest recorded speed that O. S. Nock was aware of was 102 mph (164 km/h) when D1068 hauled nine coaches (305 tons gross) down 1 in 1,320 (i.e. virtually level) at Southall. The train averaged exactly 100 mph (161 km/h) for 12.8 miles (20.6 km) between Slough and Ealing Broadway whilst hauling a service from Reading to Paddington.

However, in terms of drawbar horsepower the Westerns were in some ways less capable than similarly-powerful diesel electrics. Nock states "whilst the Westerns took their rightful place as fast and powerful locomotives it became evident that they were showing the same deficiency in actual power put forth at the drawbar as the [diesel-hydraulic] Warships had done. The highest output that came to my notice was a sustained 85 mph (137 km/h) hauling 560 tons descending 1 in 1,320, which equates to 1,500 edhp (equivalent drawbar horsepower)". A similar result was obtained when Clough & Beckett compared the performance of type 4 diesel locomotives (Classes 45/46/47/50/52) hauling trains up the ascent to Whiteball summit. They deliberately chose data to show each class in their best light and included a Western run which produced 1,775 edhp but they still concluded that "without doubt the Westerns get the wooden spoon; certainly not what one would expect from units of 2,700 bhp". The best performer was the Class 50, a 2,700 hp (2,000 kW) diesel-electric locomotive: on one run this achieved 2,115 edhp.

Despite this apparent limitation, the BR Western Region load-limit book gave the same 550 ton loading figure for both the Class 52 and Class 47 diesels over the South Devon banks between Newton Abbot and Plymouth. The reason for this is that, while the diesel-electric classes could produce high maximum tractive effort for limited periods, diesel hydraulics could produce significantly higher continuous tractive effort.

== Fleet list ==
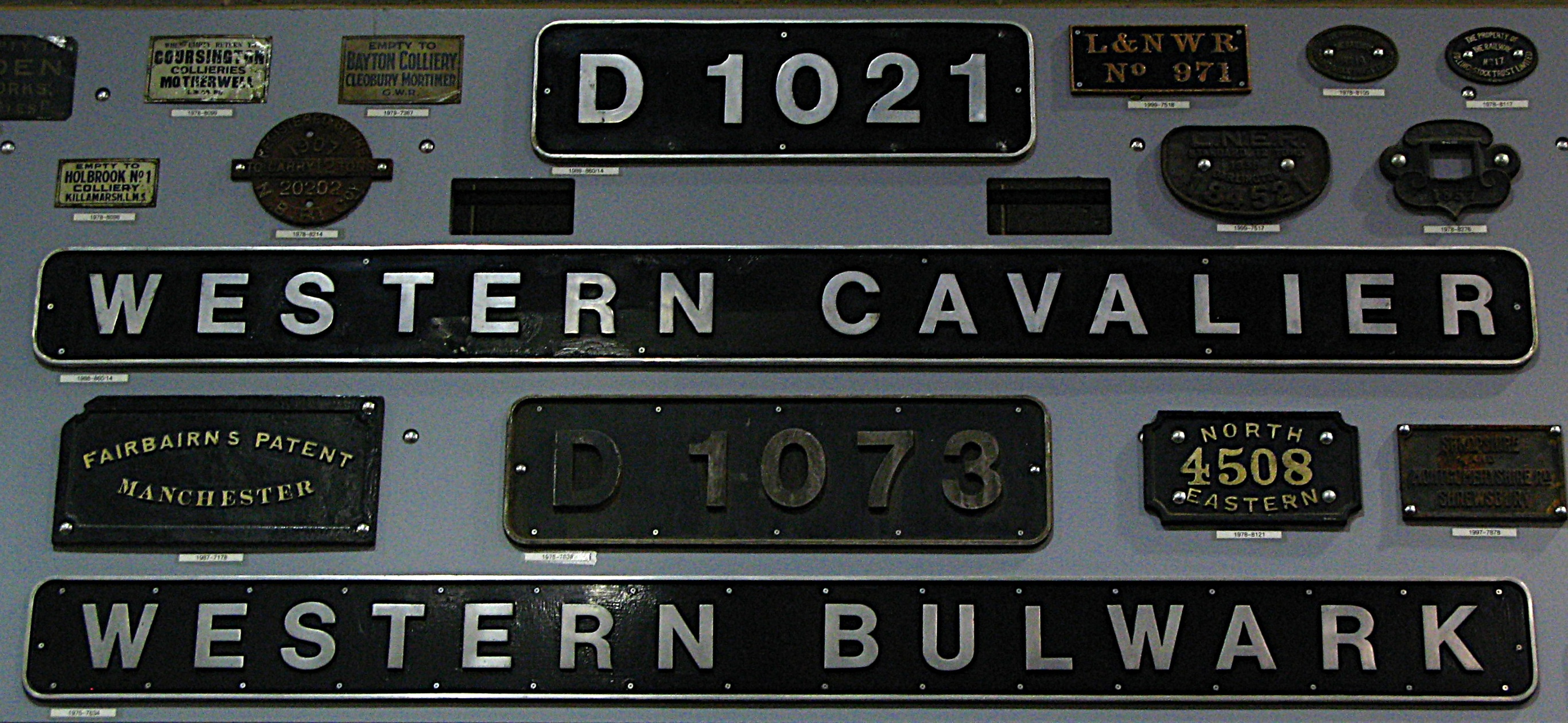
Name and numberplates for D1021 Western Cavalier and D1073 Western Bulwark at the National Railway Museum

74 locomotives were built, entering service between December 1961 and April 1964. They were all withdrawn between May 1973 and February 1977. 67 were scrapped at Swindon Works, and 7 have been preserved including D1015 which is certified for running on the national rail network, and D1023 which was taken into the National Collection.

While the first Western was under construction, proposals for liveries and names were prepared by the BR design panel. It was suggested that the locomotives were to be named after West of England place names and D1000 was photographed with a mocked up Cheddar Gorge nameplate while it was being built. When it entered service it carried the name Western Enterprise and the other locomotives were all given names prefixed with 'Western' as listed below.

The 'Westerns' were designated Class 52 under the TOPS classification scheme. With the final withdrawal of steam traction in August 1968, the 'D' prefix became redundant and some locomotives did run with the 'D' painted over. In 1973 locomotives of other classes started to be renumbered with their class number followed by a three-digit locomotive number, but it was decided not to renumber the Class 52s as they were scheduled for early withdrawal.

Westerns were equipped with a four-position headcode display. British Rail stopped using these in the 1970s and the headcode was often set to display the locomotive's number. D1023 worked a special train from London King's Cross to York in November 1976 and the headcode was replaced by marker lights at the request of the Eastern Region.

Locomotive numbers, names and service dates
Number	Name	Built at	In service	Withdrawn	Liveries	Status	Image
D1000	Western Enterprise	Swindon	20 December 1961	11 February 1974	Desert sand; Maroon; Rail blue	Scrapped	Western Enterprise in desert sand livery
D1001	Western Pathfinder	Swindon	12 February 1962	4 October 1976	Maroon; Rail blue	Scrapped	Western Pathfinder in rail blue livery
D1002	Western Explorer	Swindon	19 March 1962	29 January 1974	Green; Maroon; Rail blue	Scrapped	
D1003	Western Pioneer	Swindon	14 April 1962	5 January 1975	Green; Maroon; Rail blue	Scrapped	Western Pioneer in green livery
D1004	Western Crusader	Swindon	12 May 1962	1 August 1973	Green; Rail blue	Scrapped	
D1005	Western Venturer	Swindon	18 June 1962	14 November 1976	Maroon; Rail blue	Scrapped	Western Venturer in rail blue livery
D1006	Western Stalwart	Swindon	6 July 1962	6 April 1975	Maroon; Rail blue	Scrapped	
D1007	Western Talisman	Swindon	1 August 1962	29 January 1974 (Note: D1007 was extensively damaged in the Ealing rail disaster of 19 December 1973 and subsequently scrapped.)	Maroon; Rail blue	Scrapped	Front of Western Talisman in rail blue livery
D1008	Western Harrier	Swindon	4 September 1962	21 October 1974	Maroon; Rail blue	Scrapped	
D1009	Western Invader	Swindon	24 September 1962	10 November 1976	Maroon; Rail blue	Scrapped	Western Invader in rail blue livery
D1010	Western Campaigner	Swindon	15 October 1962	27 February 1977	Maroon; Rail blue	Preserved	Western Campaigner in rail blue livery
D1011	Western Thunderer	Swindon	27 October 1962	6 October 1975	Maroon; Rail blue	Scrapped	
D1012	Western Firebrand	Swindon	17 November 1962	4 November 1975	Maroon; Rail blue	Scrapped	Western Firebrand in rail blue livery
D1013	Western Ranger	Swindon	13 December 1962	27 February 1977	Maroon; Rail blue	Preserved	Western Ranger in rail blue livery with red nameplates
D1014	Western Leviathan	Swindon	24 December 1962	6 August 1974	Maroon; Rail blue	Scrapped	
D1015	Western Champion	Swindon	21 January 1963	13 December 1976	Golden ochre; Maroon; Rail blue	Preserved	Western Firebrand in maroon livery
D1016	Western Gladiator	Swindon	16 February 1963	28 December 1975	Maroon; Rail blue	Scrapped	Western Gladiator in rail blue livery
D1017	Western Warrior	Swindon	15 March 1963	1 August 1973	Maroon; Chromatic blue; Rail Blue	Scrapped	
D1018	Western Buccaneer	Swindon	2 April 1963	11 June 1973	Maroon; Rail blue	Scrapped	
D1019	Western Challenger	Swindon	2 May 1963	6 May 1973	Maroon; Rail blue	Scrapped	
D1020	Western Hero	Swindon	21 May 1963	4 June 1973	Maroon; Rail blue	Scrapped	
D1021	Western Cavalier	Swindon	17 June 1963	10 August 1976	Maroon; Rail blue	Scrapped	Western Cavalier in rail blue livery
D1022	Western Sentinel	Swindon	16 July 1963	26 January 1977	Maroon; Rail blue	Scrapped	Western Cavalier in rail blue livery
D1023	Western Fusilier	Swindon	23 September 1963	27 February 1977	Maroon; Rail blue	Preserved	Western Fusilier in rail blue livery with marker lights and headboard
D1024	Western Huntsman	Swindon	1 October 1963	18 November 1973	Maroon; Rail blue	Scrapped	
D1025	Western Guardsman	Swindon	1 November 1963	6 October 1975	Maroon; Rail blue	Scrapped	
D1026	Western Centurion	Swindon	24 December 1963	6 October 1975	Maroon; Rail blue	Scrapped	Western Centurion in rail blue livery
D1027	Western Lancer	Swindon	28 January 1964	2 November 1975	Maroon; Rail blue	Scrapped	Western Lancer in rail blue livery
D1028	Western Hussar	Swindon	25 February 1964	5 October 1976	Maroon; Rail blue	Scrapped	Western Hussar in rail blue livery
D1029	Western Legionnaire (Note: D1029 was initially fitted with nameplates incorrectly spelled Western Legionaire (with one N). This was corrected in April 1969, allegedly by cutting the nameplates and inserting an extra section for the second N.)	Swindon	20 April 1964	18 November 1974	Maroon; Rail blue	Scrapped	
D1030	Western Musketeer	Crewe	5 December 1963	19 April 1976	Maroon; Chromatic blue; Rail blue	Scrapped	
D1031	Western Rifleman	Crewe	20 December 1963	1 February 1975	Maroon; Rail blue	Scrapped	
D1032	Western Marksman	Crewe	31 December 1963	6 May 1973	Maroon; Rail blue	Scrapped	
D1033	Western Trooper	Crewe	17 January 1964	16 September 1976	Maroon; Rail blue	Scrapped	Western Trooper in rail blue livery
D1034	Western Dragoon	Crewe	15 April 1964	8 October 1975	Maroon; Rail blue	Scrapped	Western Dragoon in rail blue livery
D1035	Western Yeoman	Crewe	27 July 1962	5 January 1975	Green; Maroon; Rail blue	Scrapped (Note: D1010 was preserved from 1977 to 1986 with the name and numberplates of D1035 Western Yeoman.)	Western Yeoman's nameplate
D1036	Western Emperor	Crewe	29 August 1962	29 October 1976	Green; Chromatic blue; Rail blue	Scrapped	Western Emperor in rail blue livery
D1037	Western Empress	Crewe	31 August 1962	24 May 1976	Green; Chromatic blue; Rail blue	Scrapped	Western Empress in rail blue livery
D1038	Western Sovereign	Crewe	7 September 1962	8 October 1973	Green; Maroon; Rail blue	Scrapped	Western Sovereign in rail blue livery
D1039	Western King	Crewe	7 September 1962	21 July 1973	Maroon; Rail blue	Scrapped	
D1040	Western Queen	Crewe	20 September 1962	27 February 1976	Maroon; Rail blue	Scrapped	
D1041	Western Prince	Crewe	10 October 1962	22 February 1977	Maroon; Rail blue	Preserved	Western Prince in maroon livery
D1042	Western Princess	Crewe	19 October 1962	21 July 1973	Maroon; Rail blue	Scrapped	
D1043	Western Duke	Crewe	26 October 1962	5 April 1976	Maroon; Rail blue	Scrapped	Western Duke in rail blue livery
D1044	Western Duchess	Crewe	12 November 1962	1 February 1975	Maroon; Rail blue	Scrapped	
D1045	Western Viscount	Crewe	16 November 1962	16 December 1974	Maroon; Rail blue	Scrapped	Western Viscount in rail blue livery
D1046	Western Marquis	Crewe	24 December 1962	11 December 1975	Maroon; Rail blue	Scrapped	
D1047	Western Lord	Crewe	4 February 1963	29 February 1976	Maroon; Chromatic blue; Rail blue	Scrapped	
D1048	Western Lady	Crewe	15 December 1962	27 February 1977	Maroon; Chromatic blue; Rail blue	Preserved	Western Lady in green livery
D1049	Western Monarch	Crewe	14 December 1962	26 April 1976	Maroon; Rail blue	Scrapped	Western Monarch in rail blue livery
D1050	Western Ruler	Crewe	1 January 1963	6 April 1975	Maroon; Rail blue	Scrapped	
D1051	Western Ambassador	Crewe	2 January 1963	2 September 1976	Maroon; Rail blue	Scrapped	Western Ambassador in rail blue livery
D1052	Western Viceroy	Crewe	4 February 1963	6 October 1975	Maroon; Rail blue	Scrapped	Western Viceroy in rail blue livery
D1053	Western Patriarch	Crewe	11 February 1963	13 November 1976	Maroon; Rail blue	Scrapped	Western Patriarch in rail blue livery
D1054	Western Governor	Crewe	2 March 1963	25 November 1976	Maroon; Rail blue	Scrapped	Western Lady in maroon livery, double-heading a passenger train with a Warship
D1055	Western Advocate	Crewe	2 March 1963	5 January 1976	Maroon; Rail blue	Scrapped	
D1056	Western Sultan	Crewe	8 March 1963	15 December 1976	Maroon; Rail blue	Scrapped	Western Sultan in rail blue livery
D1057	Western Chieftain	Crewe	6 April 1963	30 April 1976	Maroon; Rail blue	Scrapped	
D1058	Western Nobleman	Crewe	25 March 1963	21 January 1977	Maroon; Rail blue	Scrapped	Western Nobleman in rail blue livery
D1059	Western Empire	Crewe	6 April 1963	6 October 1975	Maroon; Rail blue	Scrapped	
D1060	Western Dominion	Crewe	11 April 1963	18 November 1973	Maroon; Rail blue	Scrapped	Western Dominion in rail blue livery
D1061	Western Envoy	Crewe	19 April 1963	21 October 1974	Maroon; Rail blue	Scrapped	
D1062	Western Courier	Crewe	6 May 1963	23 August 1974	Maroon; Rail blue	Preserved	Western Courier in maroon livery
D1063	Western Monitor	Crewe	17 May 1963	5 April 1976	Maroon; Rail blue	Scrapped	Western Monitor in faded rail blue livery after withdrawal
D1064	Western Regent	Crewe	24 May 1963	11 December 1975	Maroon; Rail blue	Scrapped	Western Regent in rail blue livery
D1065	Western Consort	Crewe	18 June 1963	30 October 1976	Maroon; Rail blue	Scrapped	Western Consort in rail blue livery without nameplates after withdrawal
D1066	Western Prefect	Crewe	14 June 1963	12 November 1974	Maroon; Rail blue	Scrapped	
D1067	Western Druid	Crewe	18 July 1963	2 January 1976	Maroon; Rail blue	Scrapped	Western Courier in maroon livery
D1068	Western Reliance	Crewe	12 July 1963	13 October 1976	Maroon; Rail blue	Scrapped	Western Reliance in rail blue livery
D1069	Western Vanguard	Crewe	21 October 1963	6 October 1975	Maroon; Rail Blue	Scrapped	Front of Western Vanguard in rail blue livery
D1070	Western Gauntlet	Crewe	28 October 1963	30 December 1976	Maroon; Rail blue	Scrapped	Western Gauntlet in rail blue livery
D1071	Western Renown	Crewe	7 November 1963	7 December 1976	Maroon; Rail blue	Scrapped	Western Renown in rail blue livery
D1072	Western Glory	Crewe	7 November 1963	2 November 1976	Maroon; Rail blue	Scrapped	Western Glory in rail blue livery
D1073	Western Bulwark	Crewe	3 December 1963	29 August 1974	Maroon; Rail blue	Scrapped	Front of Western Bulwark in maroon livery

== Liveries ==
=== Early liveries ===
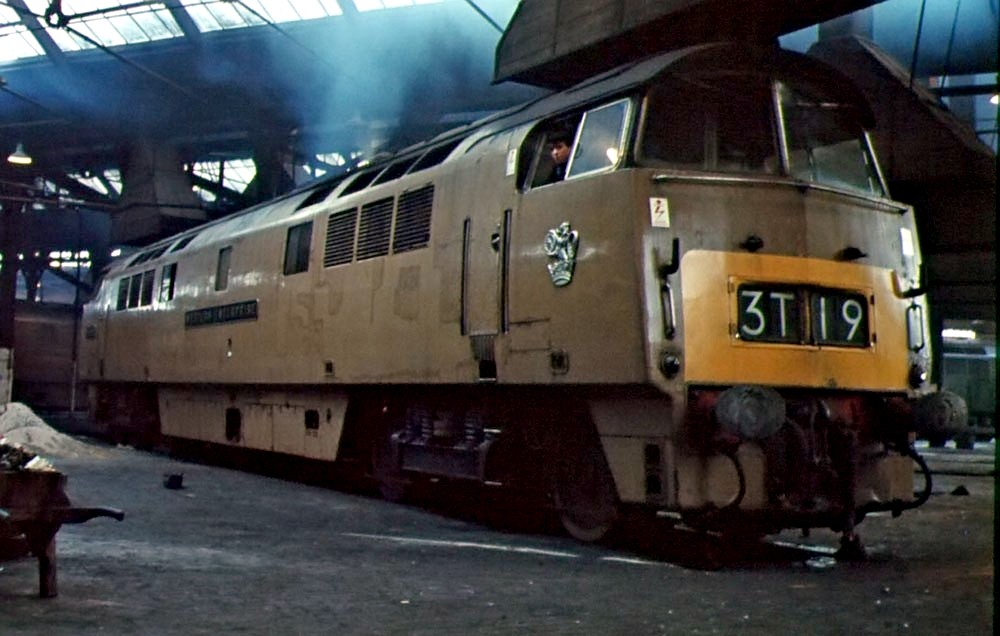
D1000 in Desert Sand livery, 1961

When the initial batch of Westerns was being built in 1961–2, British Rail was considering a new unified corporate colour scheme but had not yet made a final decision on what it would be. As a result, some of the early locomotives were painted in experimental liveries: D1000 was rolled out of Swindon Works in November 1961 painted in a light brown livery which became known as Desert Sand. Initially the numbers, borne on the left hand cab when viewed from the side, were painted in white but soon individual numbers and letters, looking like they were cast but apparently made of wood, were fitted. This was in turn replaced by the final design of cast nameplate and numberplate; metal with a black background. This livery was later altered by the addition of a small yellow warning panel at each end and a black roof.

The second locomotive, D1001 was delivered in an all-over maroon livery with yellow buffer beams and further locomotives D1002-D1004 in all-over green with small yellow warning panels. Remaining deliveries carried the all-over maroon livery, initially without yellow warning panels, but the latter were applied from new after D1010 of the Swindon-built, and D1043 of the Crewe-built locomotives. Exceptions were the first four locomotives built at Crewe, D1035–D1038, which were delivered in green livery with red backgrounds to the nameplates, and D1015, which was outshopped from Swindon in an experimental "golden ochre" livery with small yellow warning panels at each end. On one end of this locomotive, the yellow panel was embellished by the addition of a yellow band which extended sideways from each of the top corners round onto the cabside for a short distance, resembling a T shape. The locomotive is not believed to have run in this condition, but was released to traffic in the golden ochre livery with standard small yellow panels.

=== Corporate scheme ===
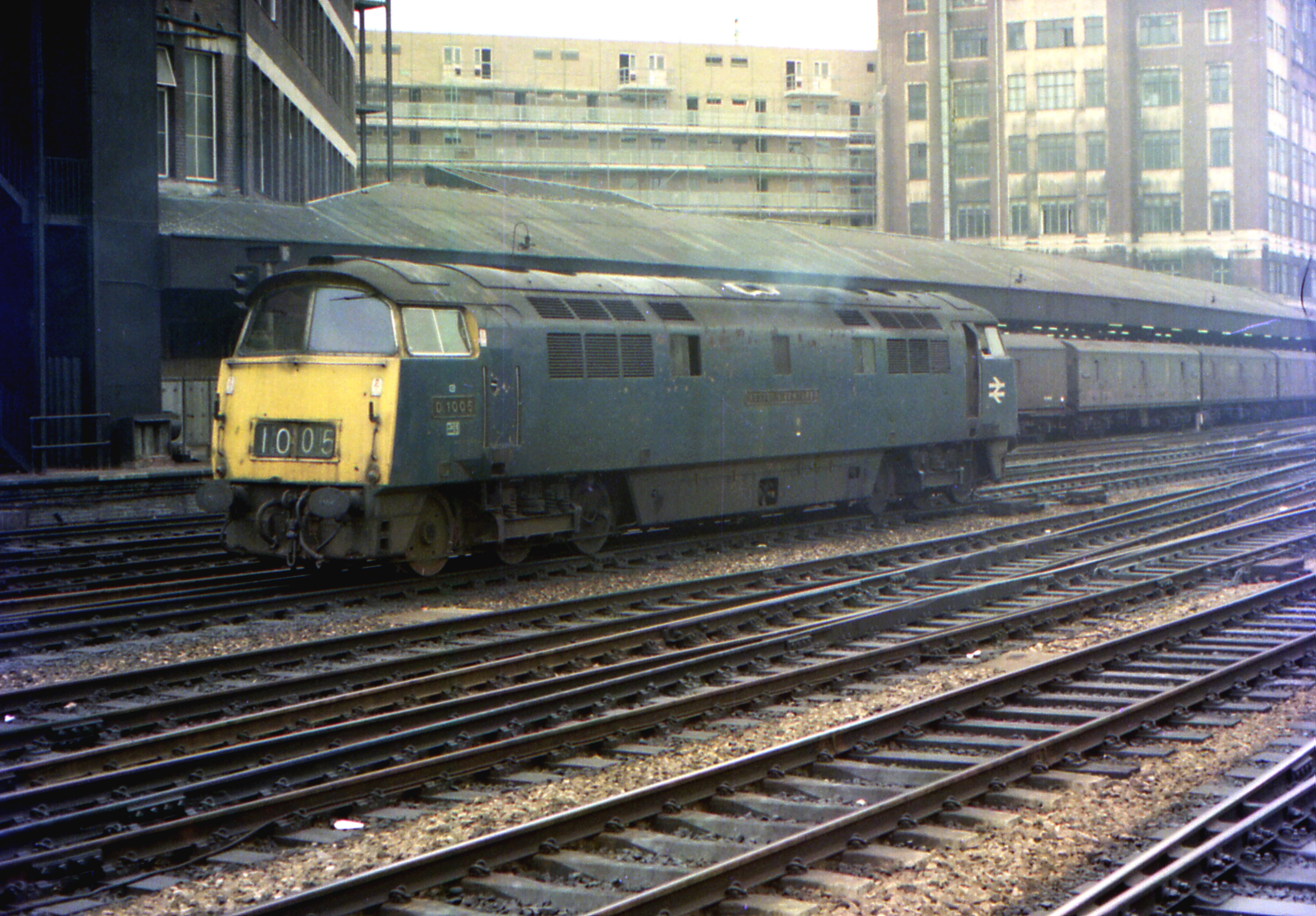
D1005 Western Venturer in BR blue.

After the adoption of Rail Blue with full yellow ends in 1966 (D1048 was the first of the class painted in this livery in 1966), for some unexplained reason a small batch of locomotives (D1017, D1030, D1036, D1037, D1043, D1047 and D1057) received this variant married to small yellow warning panels; D1030 carried red buffer beams for a short while. All other repaints were with full yellow ends which extended from the body line above the buffer beam up to the base of the window frames, along the sill of the cab-side windows onto the vertical end reveal. The valance above the cab windows on the front was also painted yellow, leaving the window frames in their base aluminium. The drive to repaint the locomotives in Rail Blue was outstripped by the safety directive dictating full yellow ends for all powered vehicles and some locomotives ran for a time with their original maroon bodies and full yellow ends.

The last locomotive to be repainted into Rail Blue was D1046, outshopped from Swindon in May 1971. Some early photographs of the blue livery give it a more metallic shade which is even more evident on the locomotives with small yellow panels. This however is possibly a photographic anomaly with colour film or due to printing techniques.

It is commonly accepted amongst Western enthusiasts in recent years that none of the class or any other British Rail locomotive of the period were ever painted with a metallic paint. However, several publications refer to initial painting in blue as being "chromatic blue" and published images do show a metallic sheen and lighter shade of blue than the standard Rail Blue.

== Incidents ==
- 15 August 1963. Knowle and Dorridge rail crash. D1040 Western Queen collided with a freight train, crushing the cab and killing the three traincrew. The locomotive was repaired and returned to service.
- 11 January 1967. St Annes Bristol rail crash. No. 1071 Western Renown in charge of the diverted 12:00 London Paddington to Swansea collided with the rear of the 11:45 Paddington to Bristol hauled by No. 1067 Western Druid. The collision resulted in very severe damage being caused to the leading cab of locomotive No. 1071, but the three men in the cab escaped injury by moving into the centre of the locomotive. Nineteen passengers required first aid or medical treatment but there were no fatalities or serious injuries. The locomotive was repaired and returned to service.
- 19 December 1973. Ealing rail crash. No. 1007 Western Talisman derailed while hauling an express passenger train, after an unlocked battery box door fell open, broke off and changed points under the locomotive. Ten people were killed. The locomotive did not return to service.
- 29 January 1975 (Oxford). No. 1023 Western Fusilier derailed with a London Paddington to Birmingham train whilst approaching the platform. This was due to a failed axle which had split due to the growth of a previously undetected crack. There were no reported injuries and the locomotive was later preserved.
- 3 January 1976 (Worcester Tunnel). No. 1055 Western Advocate crashed into a stationary parcels train killing the driver and guard of the Western. The locomotive did not return to service.

== Withdrawal ==
Withdrawal of the class began in May 1973 when D1019 Western Challenger and D1032 Western Marksman were taken out of service. The final five engines in service were withdrawn in February 1977.

Table of withdrawals
Year	Quantity in service at start of year	Quantity withdrawn in year	Locomotives withdrawn
1973	74	11	D1004, D1017, D1018, D1019, D1020, D1024, D1032, D1038, D1039, D1042, D1060
1974	63	11	D1000, D1002, D1007, D1008, D1014, D1029, D1045, D1061, D1062, D1066, D1073
1975	52	18	D1003, D1006, D1011, D1012, D1016, D1025, D1026, D1027, D1031, D1034, D1035, D1044, D1046, D1050, D1052, D1059, D1064, D1069
1976	34	27	D1001, D1005, D1009, D1015, D1021, D1028, D1030, D1033, D1036, D1037, D1040, D1043, D1047, D1049, D1051, D1053, D1054, D1057, D1063, D1065, D1067, D1068, D1070, D1071, D1072
1977	7	7	D1010, D1013, D1022, D1023, D1041, D1048, D1058

== Preservation ==
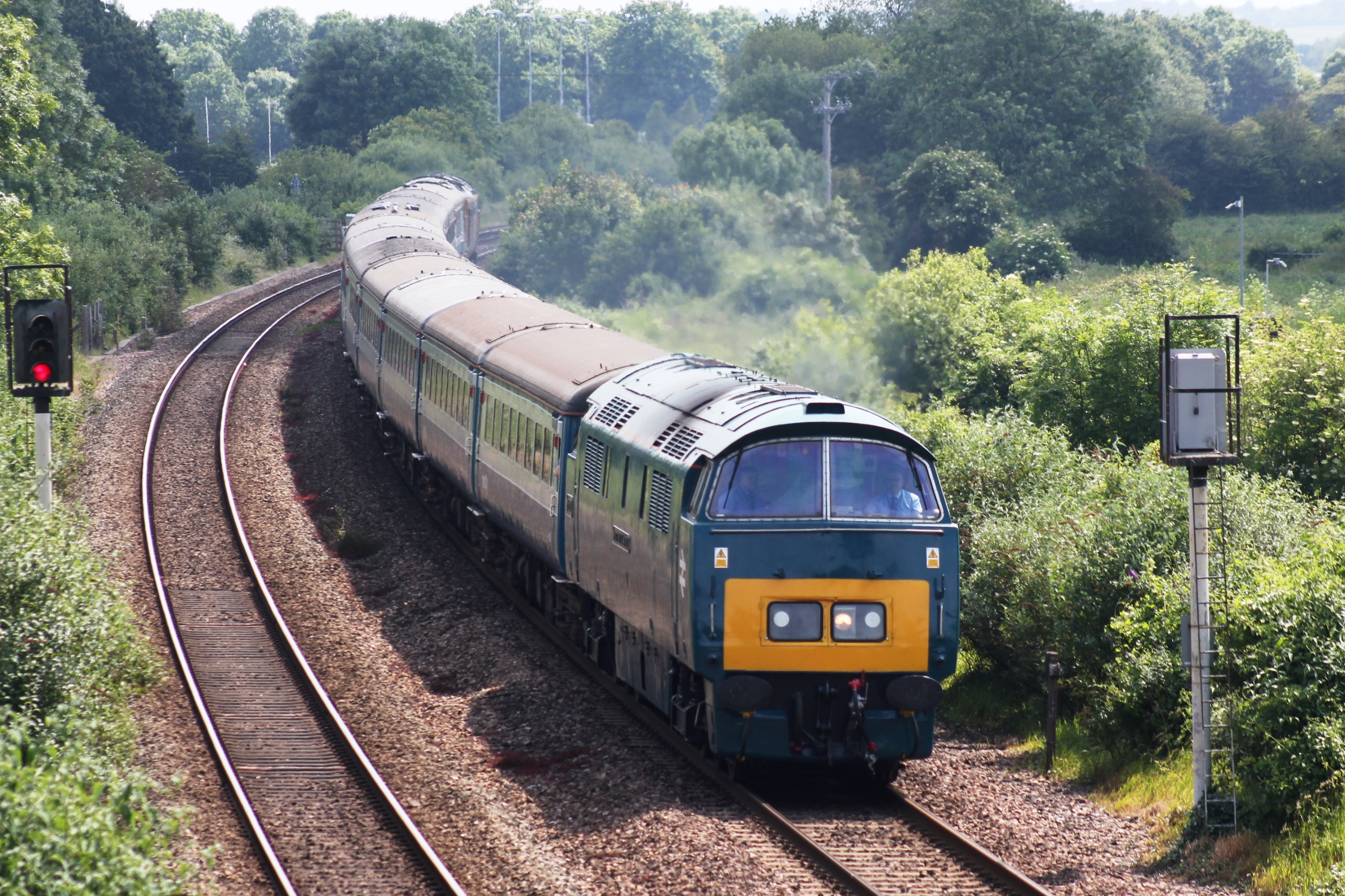
D1015 Western Champion working a railtour on the mainline near Taunton

Seven locomotives have survived into preservation at heritage railways, four Swindon-built and three Crewe-built. Two have run on the mainline in preservation with D1015 being passed to operate on the mainline since 2002. D1062 made a brief appearance in 1980 during the Rocket 150 parade at Rainhill.

Number	Name	Based at	Livery	Status
D1010	Western Campaigner	West Somerset Railway	Maroon	Undergoing maintenance
D1013	Western Ranger	Severn Valley Railway	Rail blue	Undergoing maintenance
D1015	Western Champion	Severn Valley Railway	Rail blue	Operational
D1023	Western Fusilier	Didcot Railway Centre	Rail blue	Static display
D1041	Western Prince	East Lancashire Railway	Rail blue	Undergoing maintenance
D1048	Western Lady	Severn Valley Railway	Rail blue	Undergoing restoration
D1062	Western Courier	Severn Valley Railway	Rail blue	Operational

=== D1010 Western Campaigner ===
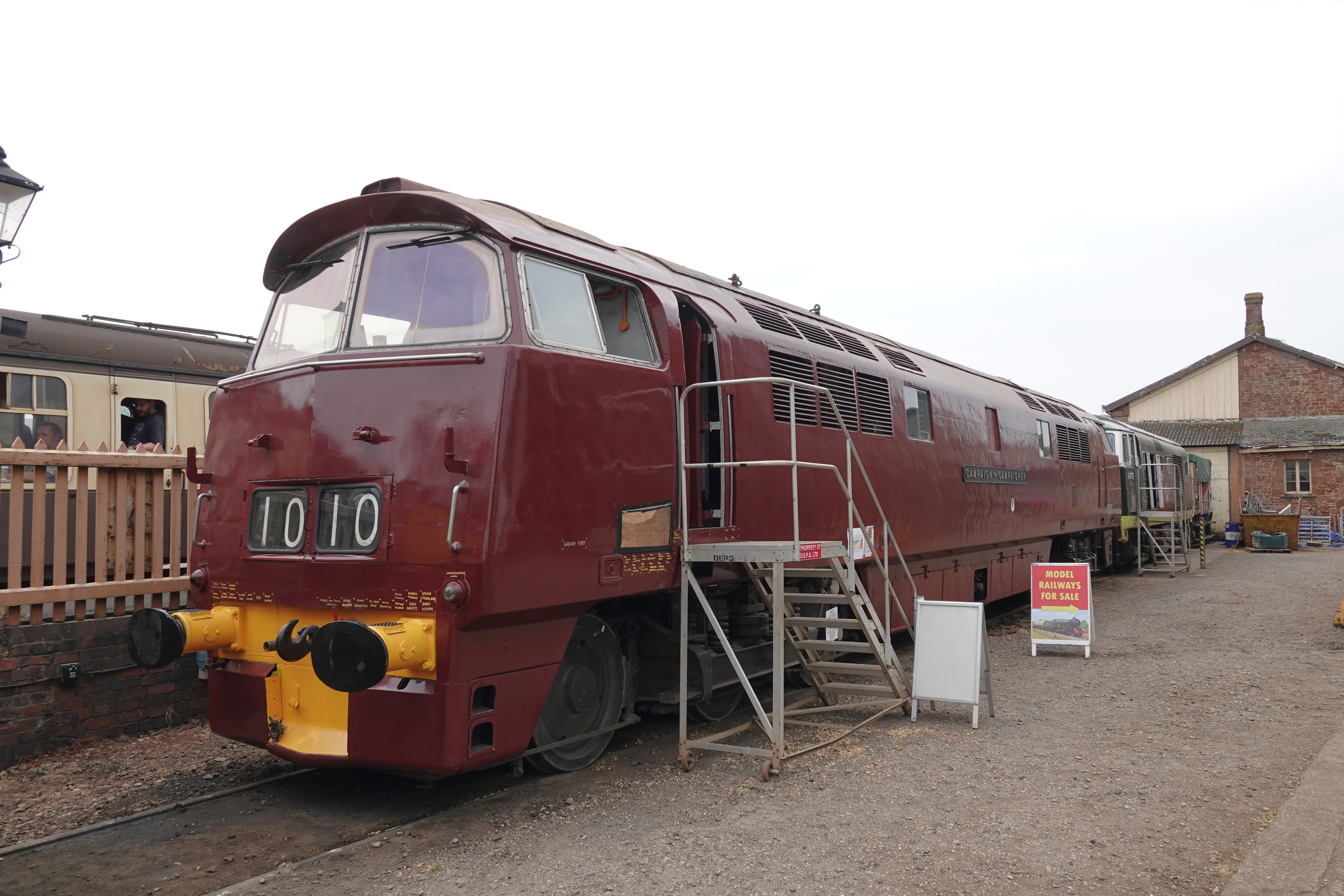
D1010 Western Campaigner in 2023

D1010 was built at Swindon and put into service from Old Oak Common Depot in October 1962. It was transferred to Laira in January 1964 and remained there for the rest of its mainline service except for a ten-month period from March 1968 when it was based at Landore.

After being one of the standby locomotives for the Western Tribute Railtour in February 1977 and then it was withdrawn. Initially preserved by Foster Yeoman with the identity of D1035 Western Yeoman, it was moved to Didcot in 1986 and then the West Somerset Railway in 1991. It is painted in maroon livery but has been out of service since June 2018.

=== D1013 Western Ranger ===
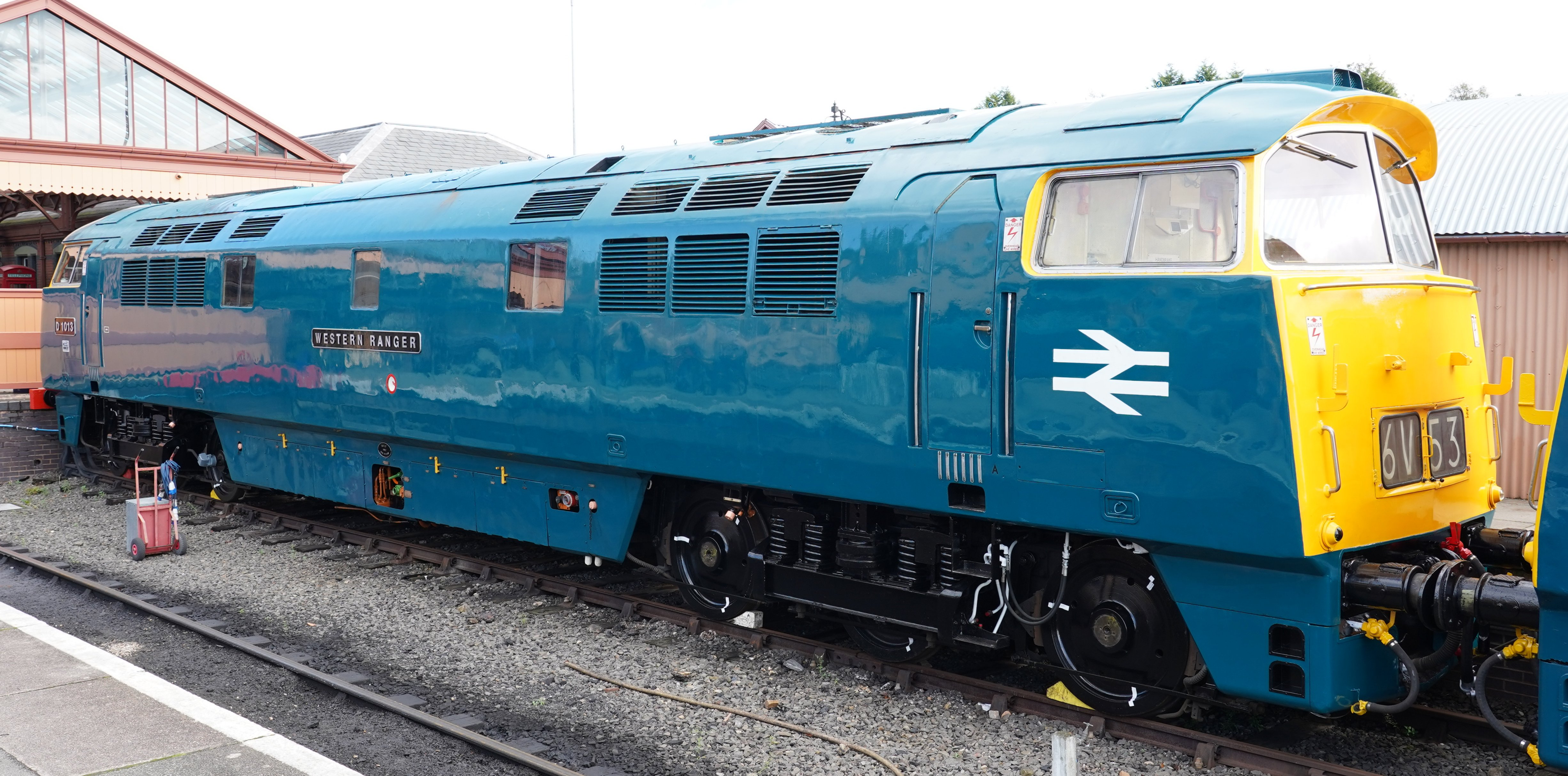
D1013 Western Ranger in 2023

D1013 was built at Swindon and placed in service at Cardiff Canton in December 1962. It moved to Laira in April 1966 then returned to Wales in April 1968 before coming back to Laira in October 1971.

It hauled the Western Tribute Railtour on 26 February 1977 (with D1023), the last Western-hauled train on British Rail after which it was withdrawn After being stored on the Torbay and Dartmouth Railway it was moved to the Severn Valley Railway in September 1978. It was repainted rail blue with full yellow ends at Kidderminster in August 2023 but is currently out of service.

=== D1015 Western Champion ===
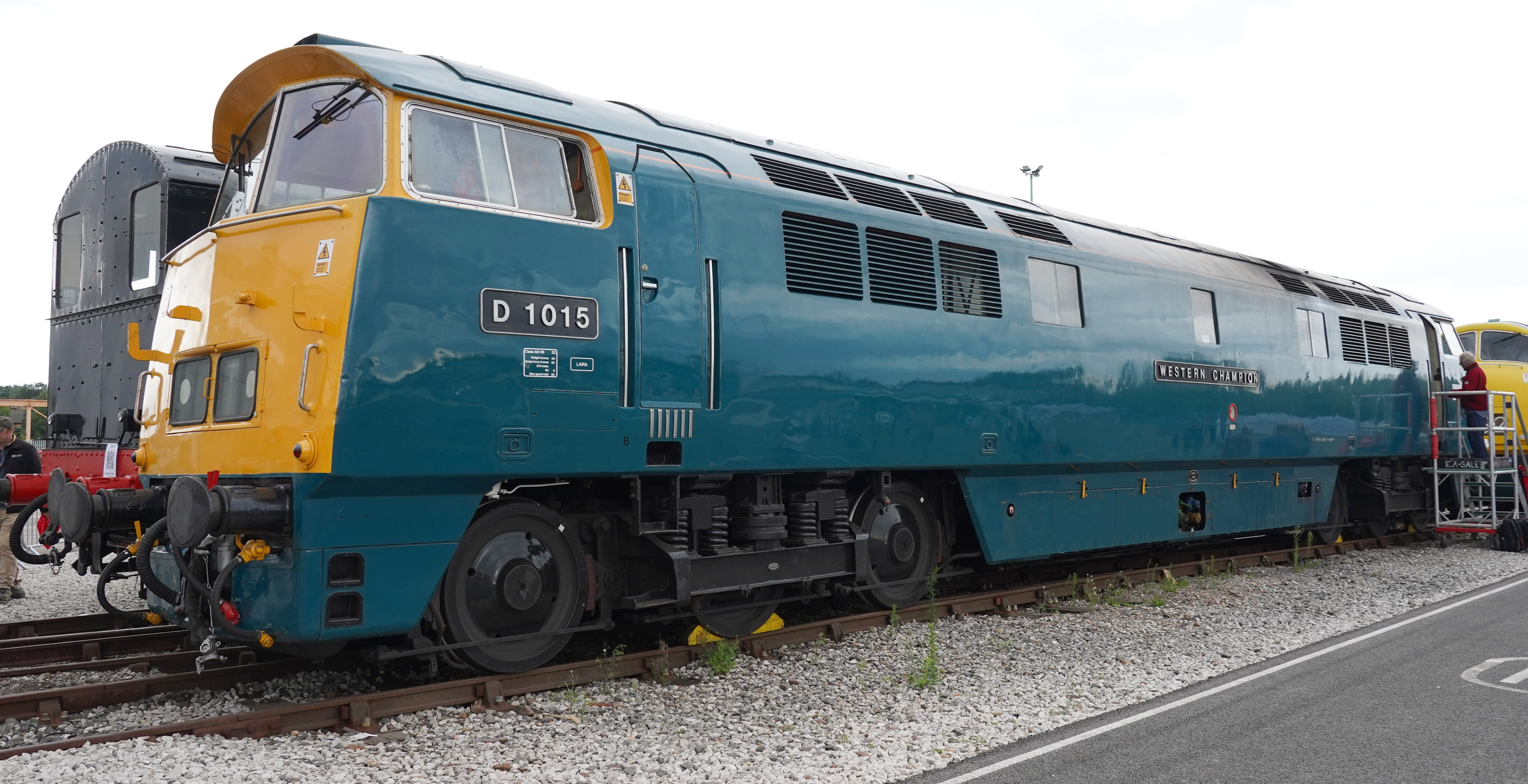
D1015 Western Champion in 2025

D1015 was built at Swindon and painted in an experimental golden ochre livery. It entered service from Cardiff Canton in January 1963 but spent several periods at Old Oak Common before being transferred to Laira in February 1964. It was allocated to Landore in November 1968 but returned to Laira in October 1971 from where it was withdrawn in December 1976.

D1015 hauled the return working of Winston Churchill's funeral train in 1965.

D1022 Western Sentinel was a candidate for preservation and was planned to be purchased by the Diesel Traction Group but it was scrapped so D1015 Western Champion was purchased instead.

D1015 was purchased by the Diesel Traction Group in January 1980 after which it took several years to restore. It arrived on the Severn Valley Railway in February 2001. It is mainline certified, its first railtour being from London Paddington to Bristol Temple Meads and Gloucester on 23 February 2002. In 2025 it ran in rail blue livery.

=== D1023 Western Fusilier ===
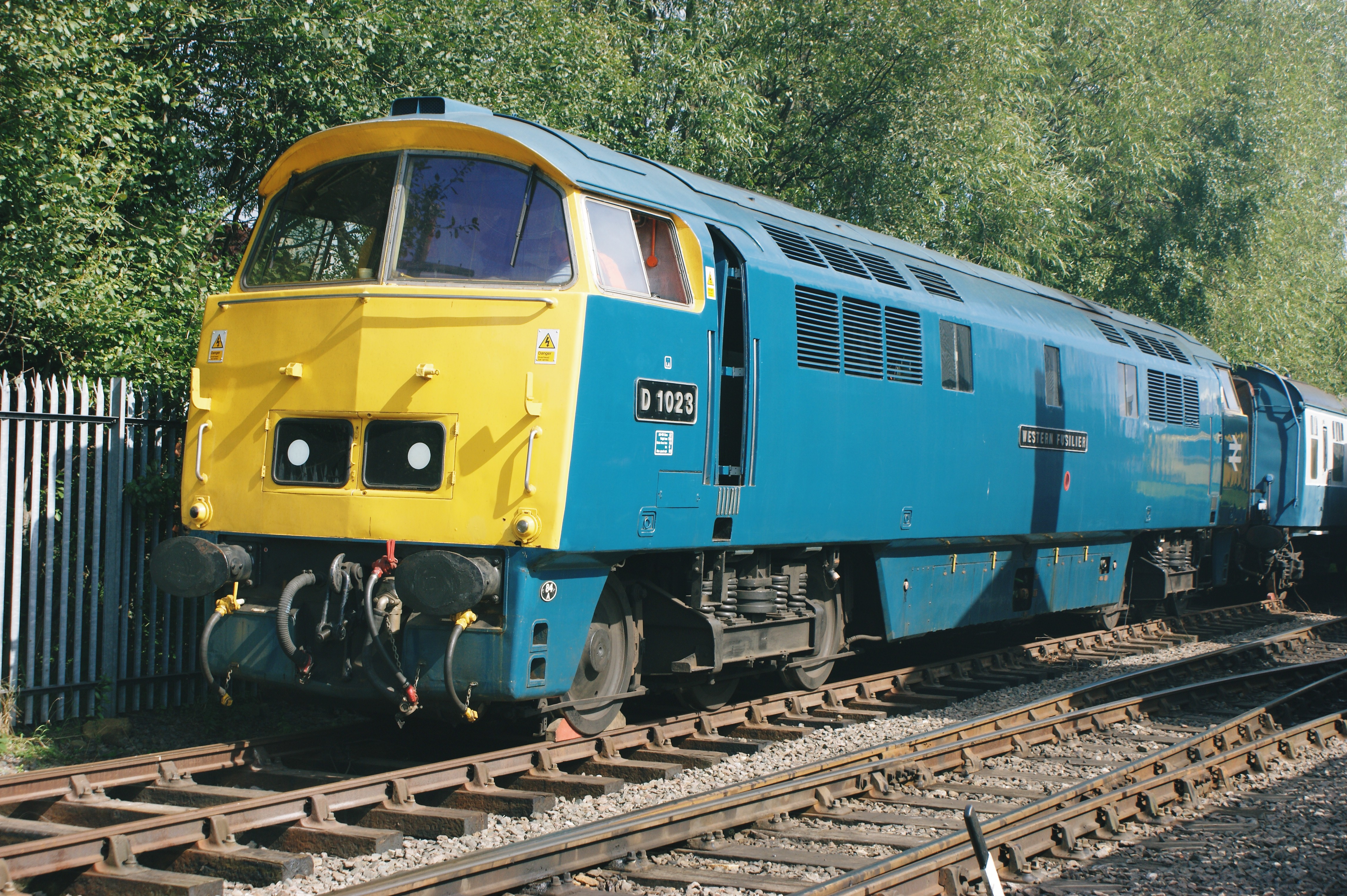
D1023 Western Fusilier in 2008

D1023 was built at Swindon Works and started service from Cardiff Canton in September 1963 where it remained except for one year at Landore (from February 1965 until March 1966) until transferred to Laira in May 1973. It hauled the Western Tribute Railtour on 26 February 1977 (with D1013), the last Western-hauled train on British Rail, and taken to the National Railway Museum in December 1977 and retained its final rail blue livery.

It is on a five-year loan to Didcot Railway Centre which started in January 2023 but it will not be operated during this time.

=== D1041 Western Prince ===
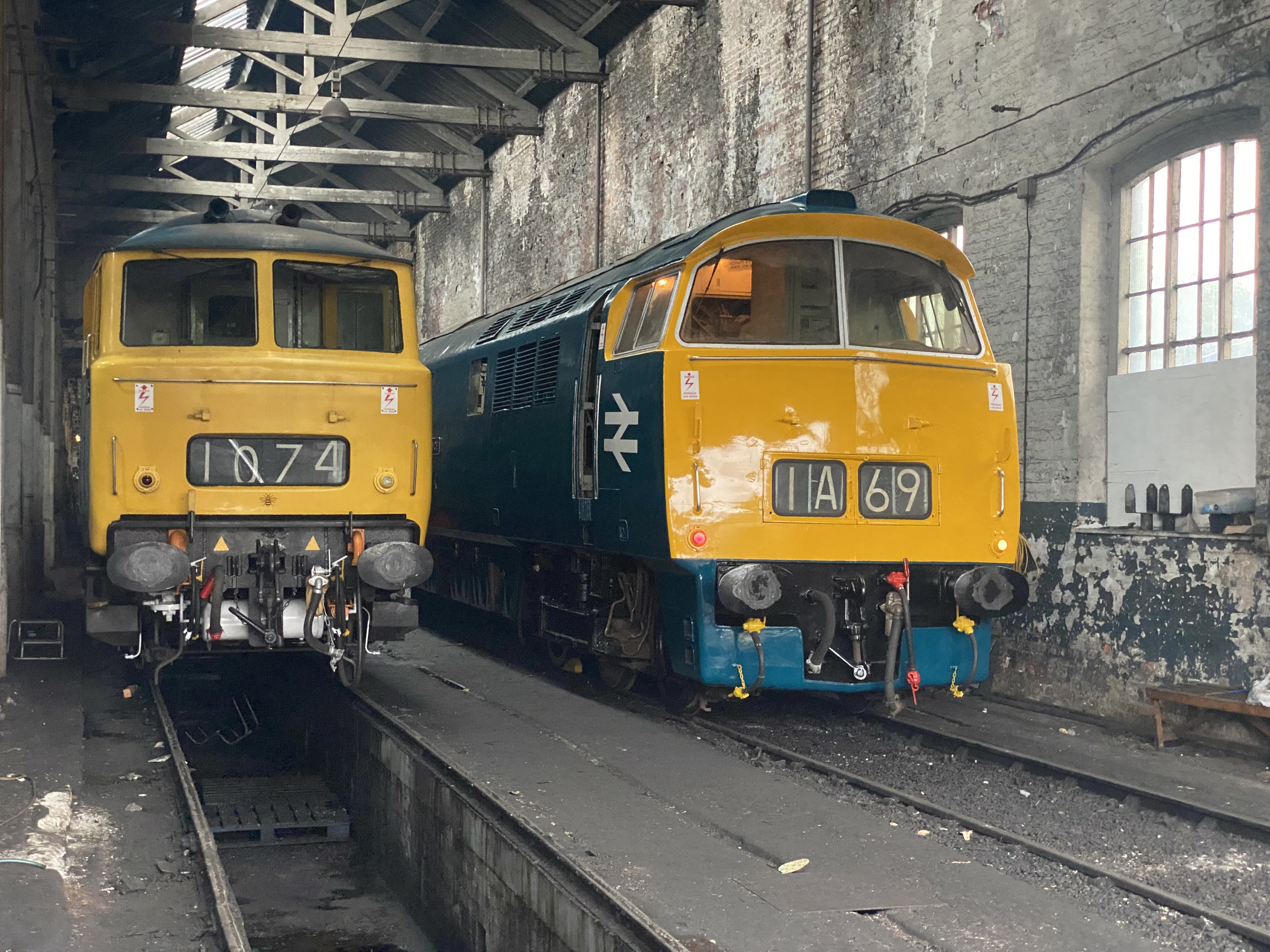
D1041 Western Prince with Class 35 'Hymek' D7076 in 2023

D1041 was built at Crewe and entered service in October 1962 at Old Oak Common, was moved to Bristol Bath Road in 1964 and then Laira in 1968. It also spent short periods at Cardiff Canton (in 1963) and Landore (in 1968). D1041 was one of the last locomotives that was in service until February 1977. After periods at Newton Abbot and Swindon Works and Horwich Works, it was moved to the East Lancashire Railway in February 1981.

It is now painted in rail blue livery but is having bodywork repairs and a full rewire.

=== D1048 Western Lady ===
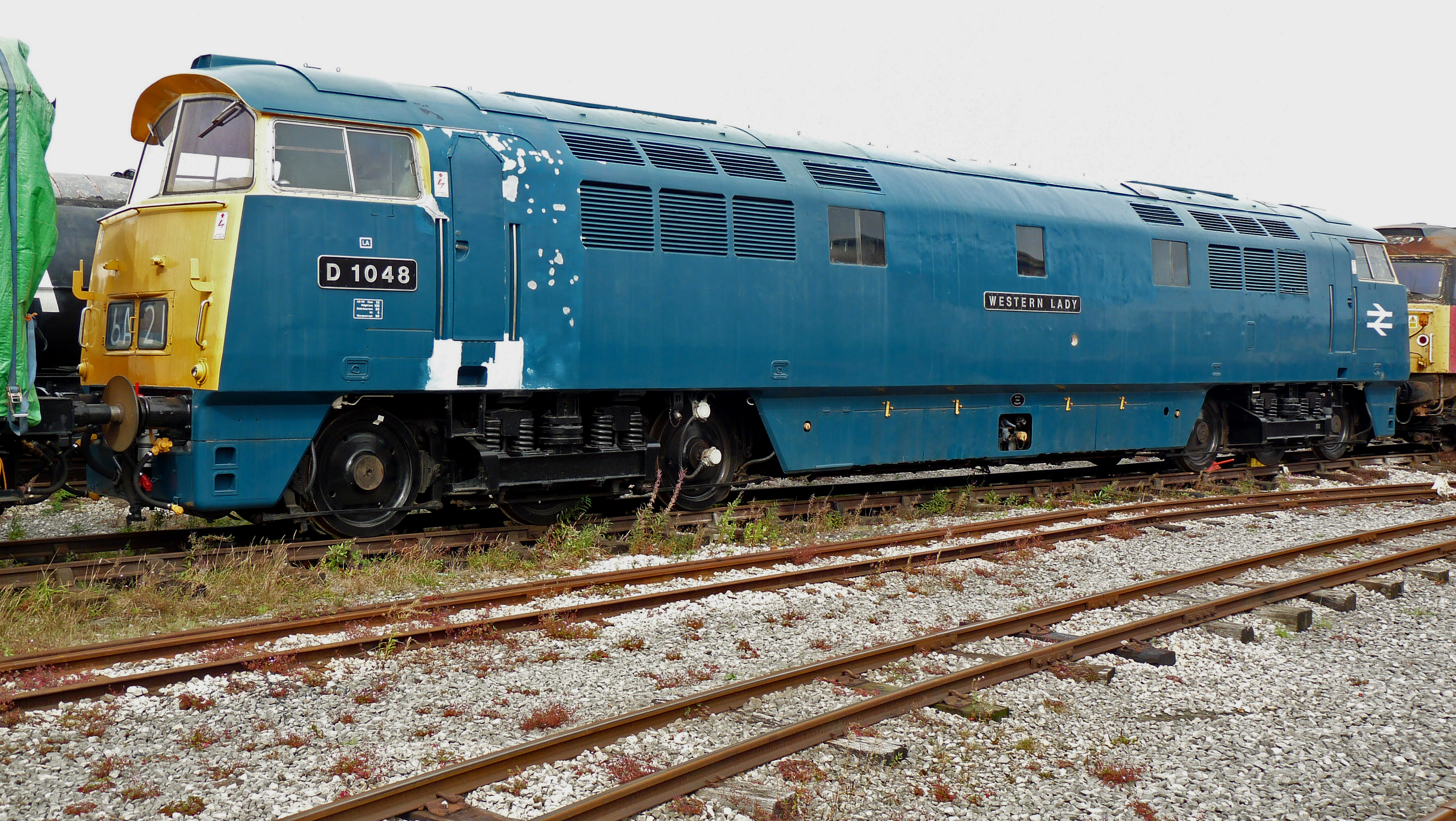
D1048 Western Lady in 2011

D1048 was built at Crewe Works and entered service in December 1962 at Cardiff Canton. After periods at Bristol Bath Road and Newton Abbot it was transferred to Laira in 1965. After withdrawal in February 1977 it was stored at Newton Abbot it was moved to the North Yorkshire Moors Railway in October 1978 but was moved to Southport by July 1983 and later to Butterley.

It was gifted to the Western Locomotive Association in October 2023 and moved to the Severn Valley Railway where it is undergoing restoration.

=== D1062 Western Courier ===
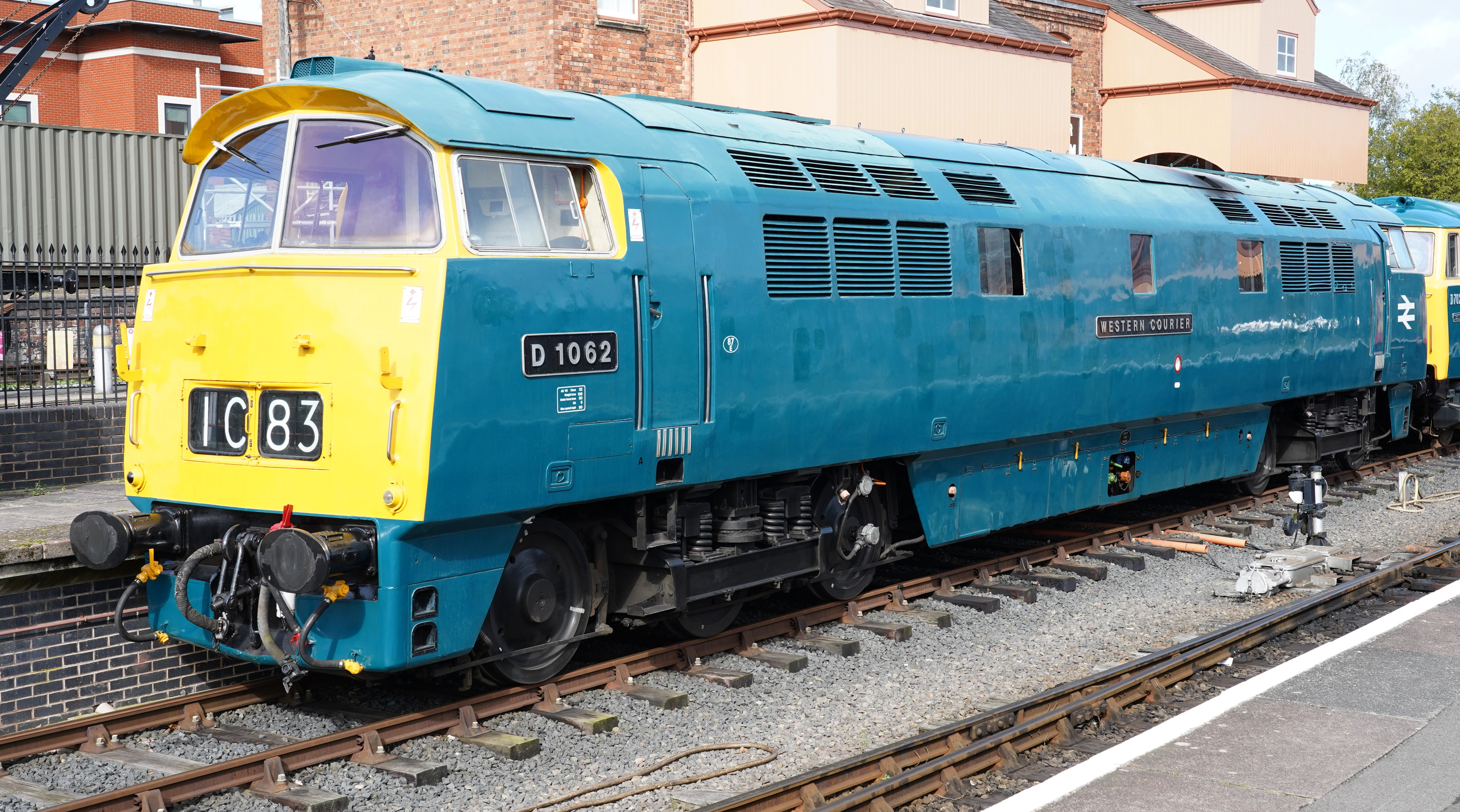
D1062 Western Courier in 2023

D1062 was built at Crewe Works and entered service in May 1963 at Old Oak Common. After short periods at Cardiff Canton and Landore it was transferred to Laira in April 1966.

After withdrawal in 1974 it was put on display at Swindon Works and then sold to the Western Locomotive Association in November 1976. It was taken to the Torbay and Dartmouth Railway in 1977 before moving to the Severn Valley Railway in 1978. It is operational and painted in rail blue livery

== Models ==
The first model of a Class 52 was produced by Trix to its unusual compromise scale of 3.8mm to 1ft with OO gauge/HO gauge (16.5mm) track. This model, however, was quite crude.

In 1979 Hornby Railways launched its first version of the BR Class 52 (type 4) Western in OO gauge. Lima also produced a model to OO gauge. Since then, OO gauge models have been produced by both Heljan and most recently Dapol.

Dapol have also produced a model in British N gauge. The Dapol models were produced from a 3D scan of D1015 Western Champion at Tyseley Locomotive Works in February 2011. An earlier British N gauge model was produced by Graham Farish.

An O gauge model has been produced by Heljan.

== See also ==
- Krauss-Maffei ML 2200 C'C', Renfe Class 340, contemporary twin engined, twin transmission C'C' diesel hydraulic locomotives
- Voith Maxima, modern (2000s) single engined, single transmission high power diesel hydraulic locomotive
