= Laira Traction and Rolling Stock Maintenance Depot =

Train maintenance facility in South West England

Laira T&RSMD
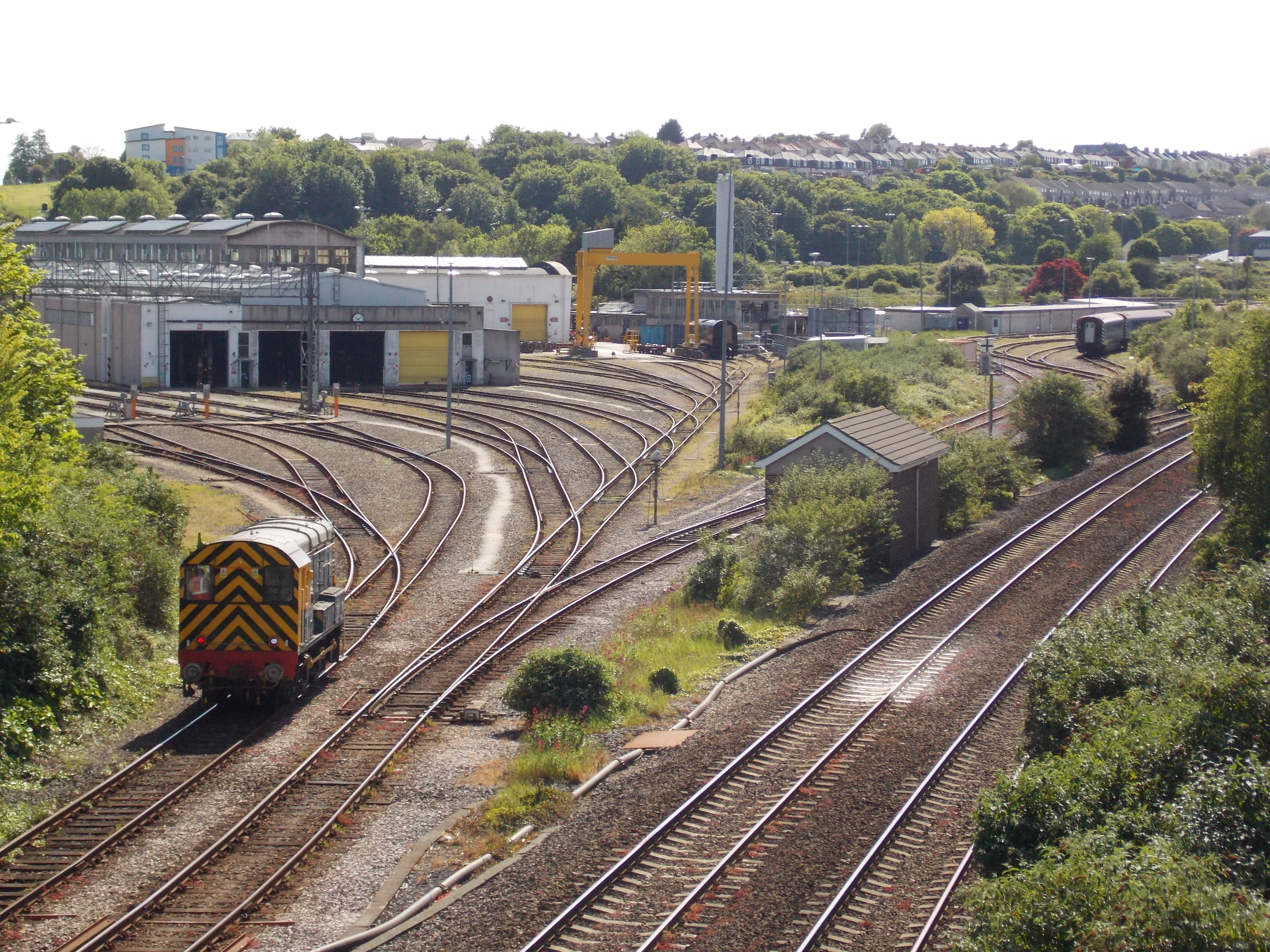
- Looking south from Laira Flyover
- Interactive map of Laira T&RSMD

Location
- Location: Plymouth, United Kingdom
- Coordinates: 50.3819°N 4.1055°W
- OS grid: SX503557

Characteristics
- Owner: Great Western Railway
- Depot code: 83D (1948-1963); 84A (1963-1973); LA (1973-present)
- Type: Diesel, HST

History
- Opened: 1901; 1931 Enlarged to replace Millbay shed 1962 Rebuilt for diesels 1981 Rebuilt for HSTs
- Original: Great Western Railway
- Pre-grouping: Great Western Railway
- Post-grouping: Great Western Railway; British Railways

Laira Traction and Rolling Stock Maintenance Depot is a railway traction maintenance depot situated in Plymouth, Devon, England. The depot is operated by Great Western Railway (GWR) and is where their fleet of Class 802 InterCity Express Trains and remaining Castle Class trains are overhauled. Other trains visit for daily servicing including some operated by CrossCountry.

After sixty years as a steam depot, servicing locomotives used on the Exeter to Plymouth line that runs past the shed as well as local lines, diesels started to arrive in 1958. A diesel depot opened in 1962 and was expanded in 1981 to accommodate the High Speed Trains.

The depot code 'LA' is used to identify rolling stock based there.

== History ==
=== Steam shed ===
Laira was the location of the temporary terminus of the South Devon Railway from 5 May 1848 when a small engine shed would have been provided. With the completion of the line to Plymouth Millbay railway station on 2 April 1849 a new shed was provided there and the facilities at Laira dismantled, although it remained a junction for the branch line to Sutton Harbour which was mixed gauge for the use of the Plymouth and Dartmoor Railway.

The Great Western Railway, which had amalgamated with the South Devon Railway on 1 February 1876, a new engine shed opened at Laira in 1901 on a site inside a triangle of lines formed by the main line, Sutton Harbour branch, and a curve that was mainly used by London and South Western Railway trains to reach their terminus at Plymouth Friary. A sewerage treatment facility and poor ground conditions constrained the site of the shed to the north west corner of the triangle (near Lipson Junction) . It was adjacent to the Embankment Road with the estuary of the River Plym just the other side of the road. The shed was a 185 ft (56 m) brick roundhouse with a 65 ft (20 m) turntable in the middle. 28 lines radiated from the turntable, one for access and the remainder for stabling locomotives. Locomotives approached from the east (Laira Junction) passing a coaling stage.

A small railway station known as Laira Halt was opened on the adjacent main line on 1 June 1904 but closed again on 7 July 1930.

Initially Laira was only used for goods locomotives but after the passenger locomotive shed at Millbay closed in 1924 it became very crowded. In 1931 a new 210 ft (64 m) long and 67 ft (20 m) wide shed with four tracks was brought into use just south of the original roundhouse, funded by a government loan under the Development (Loan Guarantees and Grants) Act 1929 (20 & 21 Geo. 5. c. 7). This became known as the 'Long Shed' or 'New Shed'. At the same time additional sidings were laid near the coaling stage (which was doubled in length) and a second track connected to give a separate exit route from the roundhouse. The new shed was built over part of the area previously used by the sewerage treatment facility. A new line connected Laira Junction with Mount Gould Junction (the southern point of the triangle of lines surrounding the shed. This line became known as the 'Speedway' and allowed locomotives to turn on the triangle rather than on the turntable inside the roundhouse.

During World War II a covered extension was added on the south side of the coaling stage to give an additional place to refuel locomotives. In 1947 some steam locomotives were converted to burn oil rather than coal. Oil tanks were installed alongside the siding to the south of the Long Shed.

=== Diesel shed ===
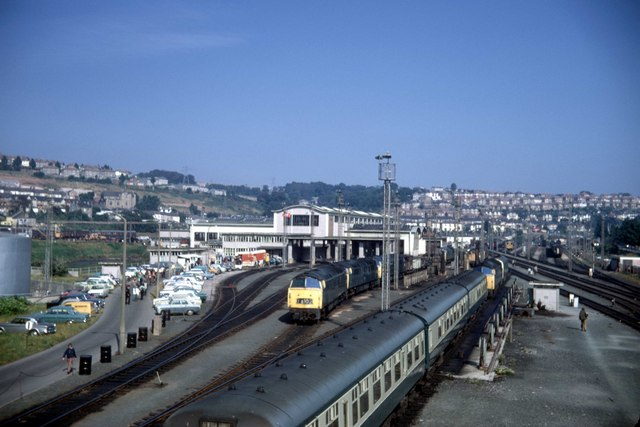
A view from the south in 1972. The carriages are standing where fuel oil was piped from wagons into the storage tanks. Two 'Westerns' stand outside the long servicing shed. The main maintenance shed is the taller building behind.

Warship Class diesel-hydraulic locomotives started to appear in 1958 and were at first accommodated in the Long Shed alongside steam locomotives until the diesel maintenance depot had been finished. The Laira marshalling yard alongside Embankment Road was closed in 1958 to make room for carriage sidings and a new diesel shed, which was fully opened on 13 March 1962, although parts had been in use since 1960.

Laira was designed for the servicing and heavy maintenance of the diesel-hydraulic locomotives favoured by the Western Region of British Railways, the first of the region's purpose designed large diesel depots. It also handled the local diesel electric shunter and DMU fleets, although servicing of the latter was done initially at Belmont sidings at Millbay.

The diesel shed was in reinforced concrete and comprised three adjoining buildings. The servicing and maintenance building that covers roads 1–4 is on the western side of the shed; number 1 road is equipped with a wheel lathe and lifting jacks for bogie changes. The central building was the Heavy Maintenance Shed; engines can be removed and repainting undertaken on the two roads, numbers 5 and 6. The final three roads were another servicing shed on the eastern side of the site. Beside this was a small covered area with fuelling points outside in the yard, supplied by a 45,000 gallon fuel tank. A small group of buildings behind the shed house stores and a workshop for shed equipment. Carriage washing takes place south of the shed at Mount Gould.

After the withdrawal of steam from the area in 1964, the roundhouse was closed on 13 June 1965 and the area used for additional siding space. This area was later modernised and fenced off in readiness for servicing the Nightstar Channel Tunnel sleeper coaches, but the proposed service from Plymouth to Paris Gare du Nord never materialised.

On 30 September 1981 a new shed, 240 m (790 ft) long was opened on the site of the smaller servicing shed on the east side of the site. This can accommodate the eight coaches and two Class 43 power cars of a High Speed Train set. An additional covered track was later added in preparation for the proposed Nightstar services.

After the replacement of High Speed Trains on London services, one road in the shed was leased to Hitachi to maintain the Class 800 and Class 802 'InterCity Express Trains' (IETs) that replaced them. A number of Class 43s continued to be based at Laira to operate four-coach services to Penzance and Cardiff Central. In Edinburgh, the depot at Craigentinny was no longer able to maintain CrossCountry's Class 43s as the space was needed by Hitachi for IETs so the 12 power cars and 5 sets of coaches were transferred to Laira. CrossCountry will withdraw its Class 43s by October 2023 when their lease ends. Great Western Railway has started to reduce the number of its Class 43-powered services in December 2022 with the aim of withdrawing most of them by December 2023. The space freed will allow them to move the maintenance of all their Class 802s to Laira.

== Historic allocation ==
Up to the 1960s Laira had an allocation that consisted of a wide variety of Great Western Railway motive power, including 4073 'Castle' Class and 6000 'King' Class express passenger locomotives. The following lists give summaries for various years.

Type	1929	1934	1950	1959
2-8-0	1 × 2800 Class; 5 x 3000 'R.O.D.' Class	4 × 2800 Class; 1 x 3000 'R.O.D.' Class; 1 x 4700 Class	1 × 2800 Class; 2 x 2884 Class; 1 x 4700 Class; 1 x WD 2-8-0 Class	2 × 2800 Class; 2 x 2884 Class; 1 x 4700 Class
4-6-0	10 × 4000 'Star' Class	10 × 4073 'Castle' Class; 8 x 4900 'Hall' Class; 8 x 6000 'King' Class	3 × 1000 'County' Class; 1 x 4000 'Star' Class; 18 x 4073 'Castle' Class; 9 x 4900 'Hall' Class; 10 x 6000 'King' Class; 2 x 6800 'Grange' Class; 2 x 6959 'Hall' Class; 4 x 7800 'Manor' Class	3 × 1000 'County' Class; 11 x 4073 'Castle' Class; 5 x 4900 'Hall' Class; 9 x 6000 'King' Class; 5 x 6800 'Grange' Class; 2 x 6959 'Hall' Class; 3 x 7800 'Manor' Class
2-6-0	3 × 2600 'Aberdare' Class; 5 x 4300 Class	3 × 2600 'Aberdare' Class; 4 x 4300 Class	3 × 4300 Class	4 × 4300 Class
2-6-2T	1 × 3100 Class; 3 x 4500 Class	3 × 3150 Class; 2 x 4400 Class; 3 x 4500 Class; 2 x 4575 Class	3 × 3150 Class; 2 x 4400 Class; 5 x 4500 Class; 5 x 4575 Class; 1 x 5100 Class	1 × 4500 Class; 7 x 4575 Class; 3 x 5100 Class
0-6-0	none	none	1 × 2251 Class	none
0-6-0T	5 × 850 Class; 6 x 1076 Class; 2 x 1813 Class	6 × 850 Class; 2 x 1076 Class; 1 x 1361 Class; 2 x 1854 Class; 1 x 2021 Class; 2 x 6400 Class; 1 x 5700 Class	4 × 1361 Class; 1 x 2021 Class; 21 x 5700 Class; 7 x 6400 Class; 1 x 9400 Class	3 × 1361 Class; 1 x 1600 Class; 8 x 5700 Class; 6 x 6400 Class; 3 x 9400 Class
4-4-0	none	5 × 3300 'Bulldog' Class	none	none
0-4-2T	none	none	none	2 x 1400 Class
Diesel	none	none	none	See below

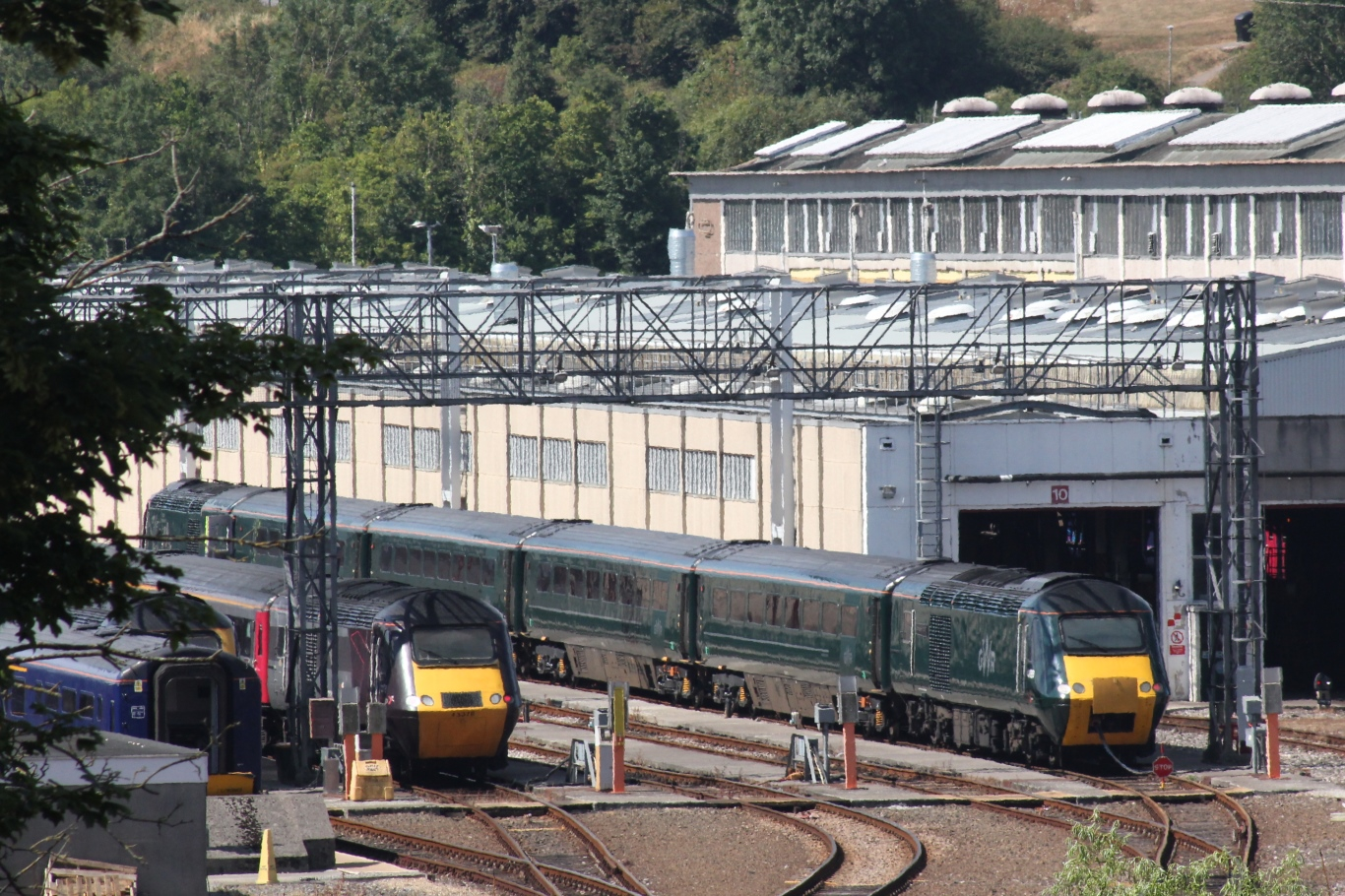
CrossCountry and Great Western Railway Class 43s in the carriage sidings beside the depot.

The depot was designed to maintain and service the Western Region of British Rail's diesel-hydraulic locomotives. It became strongly associated with the 'Western' Class. The first 14 of these were delivered new to Laira in 1961 and 1962. They were transferred to other depots after a few months but Laira received a fresh allocation in 1964 and by October 1971 the whole fleet of 74 locomotives were based here. Withdrawals started in 1973 and the last were withdrawn in 1977.

By this time British Rail Class 50 diesel-electric locomotives had taken over many of their duties. These were later given warship names in the same manner as the first diesel hydraulics. A fleet of DMUs was also stationed here for operating the branch lines in Devon and Cornwall.

Since the Privatisation of British Rail the allocation has largely consisted of Class 43 power cars for High Speed Trains along with some Class 08 shunting locomotives. The DMUs in Devon and Cornwall were based at Cardiff Canton TMD for several years, but in December 2007 Laira had an allocation of two-car Class 150 and single-car Class 153 DMUs. After a while these were transferred to a reopened Exeter Traction Maintenance Depot.

Type	1959	1974	1988	2010
Main line	3 × Class 22; 5 x Class 41; 4 x Class 42	12 × Class 25; 11 x Class 46; 10 x Class 50; 54 x Class 52	6 × Class 37; 26 x Class 43; 30 x Class 50	30 × Class 43
Shunting	2 × Class 03; 6 x Class 08	2 × Class 03; 7 x Class 08	13 × Class 08	3 × Class 08
DMU		5 × Class 101 3-car 3 x Class 116 3-car 2 x Class 118 3-car 6 x Class 119 3-car 1 x Class 119 2-car 1 x Class 120 2-car 2 x Class 122 1-car 1 x Class 122 DTS	9 × Class 101 2-car 4 x Class 108 2-car 2 x Class 118 3-car 3 x Class 118 2-car 1 x Class 121 1-car 3 x Class 122 1-car 2 x Class 121 DTS	none

== Servicing ==
In addition to repairs and overhauls of the trains allocated to the Laira, the depot undertakes daily servicing on other classes of train. In 2022 these were

- Allocated to Laira:
  - Class 43 'Castles' (3 sets, 6 power cars)
  - Class 43 'High Speed Trains' (2 sets, 4 power cars for CrossCountry)
- Allocated to other depots
  - Class 800 and Class 802 'InterCity Express Trains' (17 sets)
  - Class 150 DMUs (2 sets)
  - Class 220 and Class 221 CrossCountry 'Voyagers' (6 sets for CrossCountry)

During 2023 both Class 43 fleets were run down but Class 802s were allocated to Laira.

== Shed codes ==
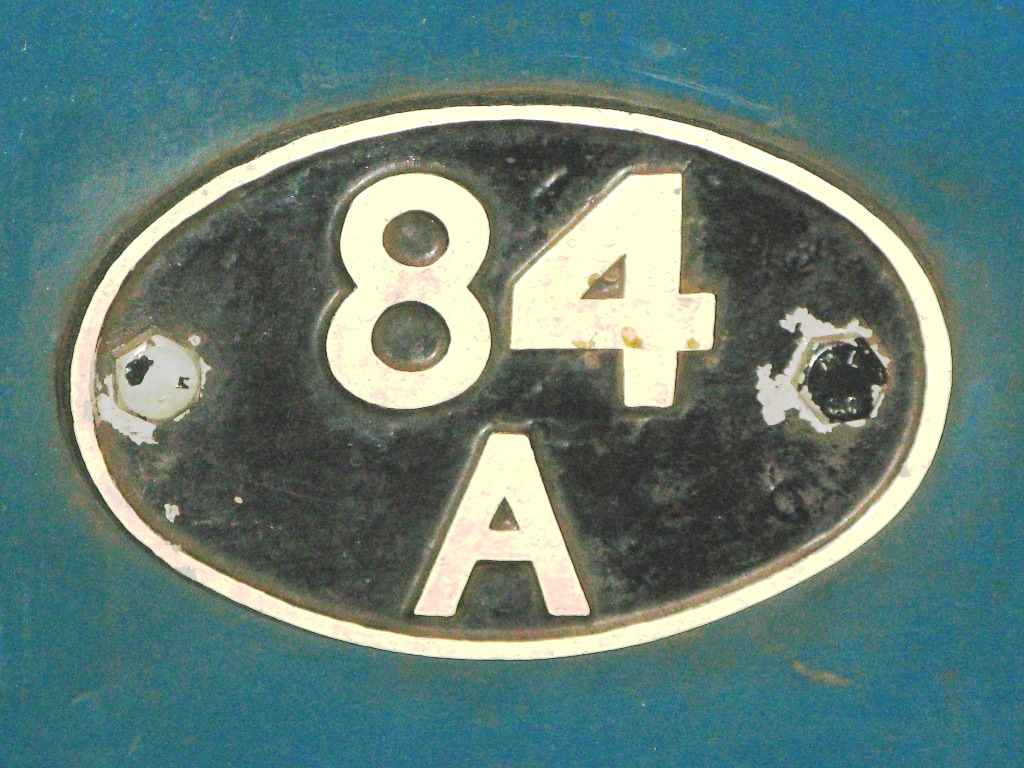
A shed plate carried by a Laira engine

The following shed codes have been used to identify locomotives allocated to Laira:

LA	Great Western Railway
83D	British Railways	from 1949
84A	British Railways	from 1963
LA	British Rail	from 1973

== Named locomotives ==
Locomotives named after Laira depot have been:

Image	Name	Locomotive	Company	Class	Name carried	Notes
	Laira	3338	GWR	Bulldog	1900-1930	4-4-0 steam locomotive. Renumbered 3326 in 1912.
	Pride of Laira	43179	BR	Class 43	1991-2017	Named during a depot open day.
	Laira Diesel Depot	08644	GWR (First)	Class 08	2015-	
	Pride of Laira	08641	GWR (First)	Class 08	2017-	
	Laira Diesel Depot	43184	CrossCountry	Class 43	2023	
