= British Rail Class 22 =

Class of diesel-hydraulic locomotives

North British Type 2 diesel-hydraulic British Rail Class 22
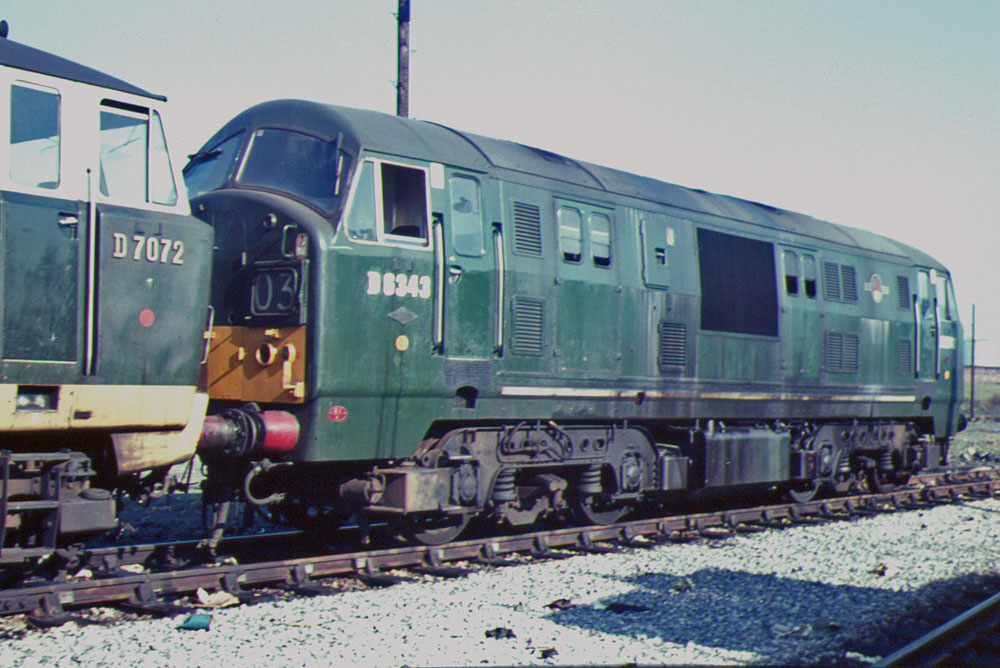
- A Class 22 at Old Oak Common, 1965
Type and origin
- Power type: Diesel-hydraulic
- Builder: North British Locomotive Co.
- Build date: 1959–1962
- Total produced: 58
Specifications
- Configuration
  - UIC: B'B'
  - Commonwealth: B-B
- Gauge: 4 ft 8 1/2 in (1,435 mm) standard gauge
- Wheel diameter: 3 ft 6 in (1.067 m)
- Minimum curve: 4.5 chains (300 ft; 91 m)
- Wheelbase
  - Engine: 34 ft 6 in (10.52 m)
  - Bogie: 8 ft 6 in (2.59 m)
- Pivot centres: 23 ft (7.0 m)
- Length: 46 ft 8 1/2 in (14.237 m)
- Width: 8 ft 8 in (2.64 m)
- Height: 12 ft 10 in (3.91 m)
- Loco weight: D6300–D6305: 68 long tons (69 t); D6306–D6357: 65 long tons (66 t)
- Fuel capacity: 450 imp gal (2,000 L; 540 US gal)
- Prime mover: D6300-D6305, NBL / MAN L12V18/21A 1,000 bhp (750 kW) at 1445 rpm D6306-D6357, NBL / MAN L12V18/21BS 1,100 bhp (820 kW) at 1530 rpm
- Transmission: Hydraulic: Voith / NBL LT.306r
- MU working: D6300–D6305: ■ Orange square D6306–D6357: ◆ White diamond
- Train heating: 1,000 pounds (454 kg) per hour steam generator 500 imp gal (2,300 L; 600 US gal) capacity
- Loco brake: Vacuum controlled air brake, hand brake
Performance figures
- Maximum speed: 75 mph (121 km/h)
- Power output: Engine: 1,000 hp (746 kW)
- Tractive effort: 38,000 lbf (170,000 N) @ 25% adhesion
Career
- Operators: British Rail
- Numbers: D6300–D6357
- Nicknames: Baby Warship
- Axle load class: GWR: ●Blue; BR: Route availability 4
- Retired: 1967–1972
- Disposition: All scrapped
- Sources: except where noted

The British Rail Class 22 or "Baby Warship" was a class of diesel-hydraulic locomotives designed for the Western Region of British Railways and built by the North British Locomotive Company. They were very similar in appearance to the Class 21 diesel-electrics, although shorter in length by almost five feet. The nickname Baby Warship related to the similarity in appearance (and internal equipment) to the British Rail Class D20/2 or Class 41 Warship Class. The Class 22s were numbered D6300-D6357.

== History ==
=== Introduction ===
Distribution of locomotives, July 1967
British Rail Class 22 is located in Southern England
Code	Name	Quantity
81A	Old Oak Common	20
82A	Bristol Bath Road	16
83A	Newton Abbot	9
84A	Laira	13
Total:		58

D6300 was introduced to traffic in 1959 and deliveries continued until 1962. The Class 22s were allocated to Bristol Bath Road, Laira Plymouth, Newton Abbot and Old Oak Common. The majority of the class always operated in the West of England, on a range of local passenger and freight work, with smaller numbers of the later units operating on local work in the Bristol area and around London Paddington (notably moving empty carriages between the main station and Old Oak Common yard).

=== Availability ===
Initially the locomotives had some problems with engine and transmission faults, but could be returned to North British Locomotive Works (NBL) for repair under the contractual agreement. By 1961, reliability had improved, but with the more powerful locomotives of Classes 35, 42, and 43 now being available, the locomotives were displaced onto more secondary duties, including work on the former Southern Region lines west of Exeter. By the mid 1960s, the locos had settled down to give reliable service, with availability over 85%. (Note: Average availability was 85%, with one locomotive permanently out of service, with no action being taken to fix it.)

=== Decline ===
NBL went bankrupt in 1962 and, by the late 1960s, withdrawn locomotives were being used to provide spares. Attrition was inevitable and the withdrawals, which had commenced in 1967, finished with the withdrawal of 6333, 6336, 6338 and 6339 on 1 January 1972. Ex-London Midland Region Class 25 diesel-electrics were drafted in as replacements.

== Livery ==
The NBL type 2s were introduced in all-over green livery with a light grey skirt band, mid-grey roof, red buffer beams and black underframe. Numbers appeared below all four cab windows, below the number was the builders plate with the GWR Route Dot beneath that, and the BR 'lion and wheel' emblem was placed high on the bodyside as centrally as possible. Later a small yellow warning was added. From 1967 some locos were repainted in the new corporate rail blue livery. The first four repaints, D6300, D6303, D6314 and D6327 had small yellow warning panels which they retained until withdrawal, later blue repaints had full yellow ends. Only about half the class were repainted into blue. The BR logo was placed immediately below each cab window, with the loco number below this; on some locos this was reversed, some loco's kept the GWR Dot, which would be placed below the Logo and Number.

== Models ==
Dapol released a 00 gauge model of the class 22 in late 2011.
