= British Rail Class 41 (Warship Class) =

Class of diesel-hydraulic locomotives

D600 Class British Rail Class 41
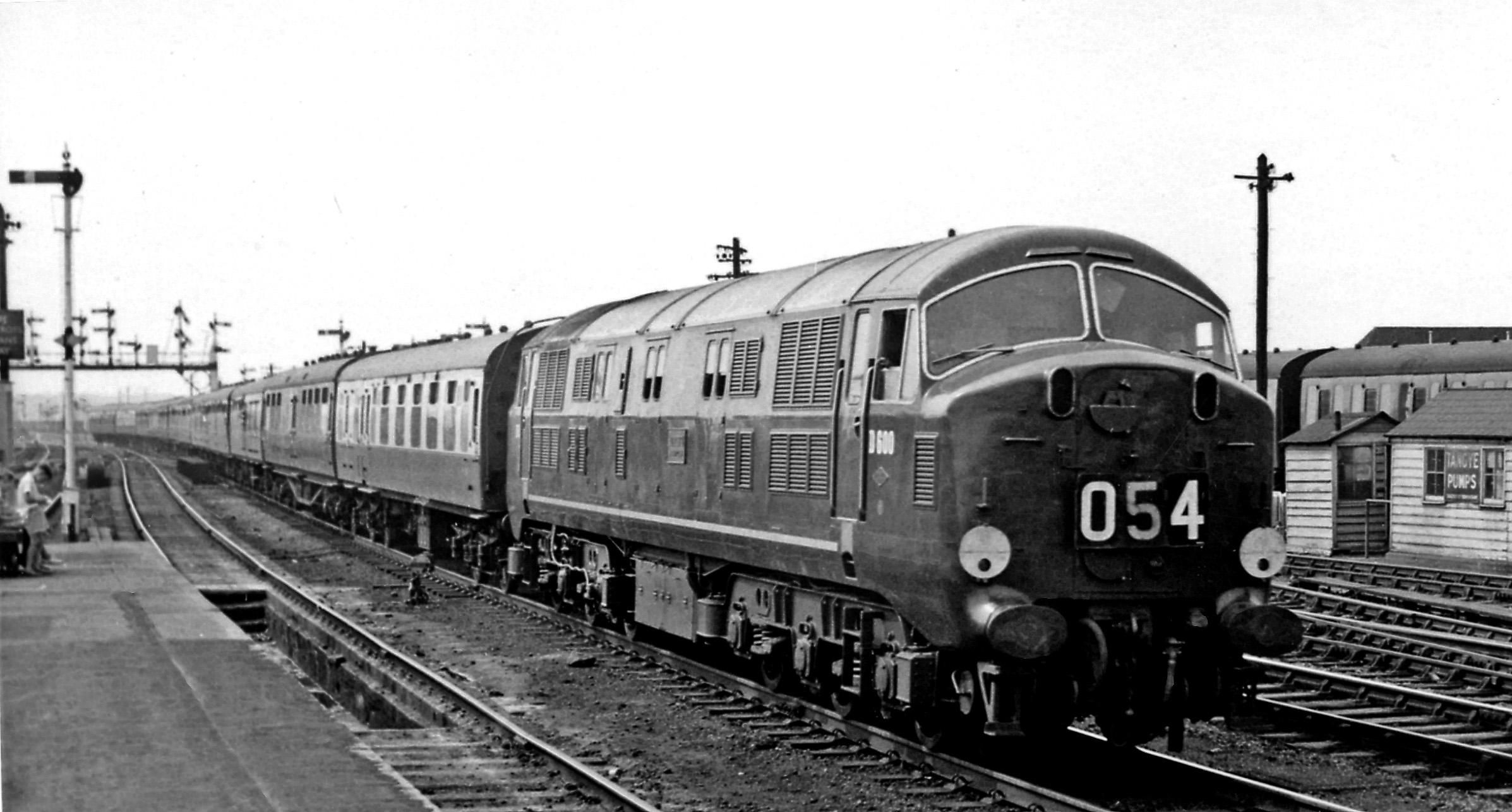
- D600 'Active' at Reading in 1959
Type and origin
- Power type: Diesel-hydraulic
- Builder: North British Locomotive Co.
- Serial number: 27660–27664
- Build date: 1958–1959
- Total produced: 5
Specifications
- Configuration
  - UIC: (A1A)(A1A)
  - Commonwealth: A1A-A1A
- Gauge: 4 ft 8 1/2 in (1,435 mm) standard gauge
- Wheel diameter: Driving: 3 ft 7 in (1.092 m); Carrying: 3 ft 3 1/2 in (1.003 m)
- Wheelbase: 50 ft 0 in (15.24 m)
- Length: 65 ft 0 in (19.81 m)
- Width: 8 ft 8 in (2.64 m)
- Height: 12 ft 10 in (3.91 m)
- Loco weight: 117 long tons (119 t; 131 short tons)
- Fuel type: Diesel
- Fuel capacity: 800 imp gal (3,600 L; 960 US gal)
- Prime mover: 2 × NBL-MAN L12V 18/21S
- RPM
  - Maximum RPM: 1,445
- Engine type: V12 Diesel
- Transmission: Hydraulic, Voith L306r
- MU working: ■ Orange Square
- Train heating: Steam
- Train brakes: Vacuum
- Safety systems: AWS
Performance figures
- Maximum speed: 90 mph (145 km/h)
- Power output: Engines: 1,000 bhp (746 kW) × 2
- Tractive effort: Maximum: 50,000 lbf (222 kN); Continuous: 39,600 lbf (176 kN)
- Brakeforce: 88 long tons-force (877 kN)
Career
- Operators: British Railways
- Numbers: D600–D604
- Nicknames: "Warships”
- Retired: December 1967
- Disposition: All scrapped

The British Rail Class 41, originally known as the D600 Class, were diesel-hydraulic locomotives built by the North British Locomotive Company in Glasgow during 1957 and 1958. Although they were withdrawn before TOPS was introduced, British Rail classified them as Class 41. All were named after Royal Navy vessels, hence the nameplates each bore a subtitle "Warship Class".

== History ==
The fleet was ordered by the British Transport Commission (BTC) as direct comparison with the British Rail Class 40, and were not actually wanted by the Western Region, who preferred their production fleet of D800 Warships. The D600s were the result of power politics within the BTC and the WR: the former was unwilling to sanction radical, stressed-skin lightweight construction locomotives at the time, while the latter was equally insistent that at least some of the new Type 4 power range locomotives on order be equipped with hydraulic transmission. They were much heavier than production Warships (almost 120 long tons (122 t; 134 short tons) compared to 80 long tons (81.3 t; 89.6 short tons)) and can be regarded as standard 1950s British design diesel locomotives that just happened to contain two lightweight, high-revving diesel engines coupled to hydraulic transmissions rather than one large, slow-revving diesel engine and electrical generator set. For this reason they were practically obsolete in design terms before they had left the drawing board.

== Mechanical details ==
Each locomotive was equipped with two MAN L12V18/21A diesel engines, each set to produce 1,000 hp (750 kW) at 1,445 rpm. This conservative rating was partly because NBL was very inexperienced at constructing diesel locomotives and partly because the Voith L306r three speed transmissions available at the time were not able to accept more. MAN had refined the engine design to produce 1,100 hp (820 kW) at around the time the D600 order was placed with NBL. The A1A-A1A wheel arrangement likewise came about because the BTC-mandated heavyweight construction required 6 axles to keep to a 20-ton axle loading, but NBL could not work out how to create a pivotless bogie and driving arrangement for C-C wheel arrangement. There were no C-C diesel-hydraulic locomotives to use as a template in mid-1955. The arrangement produced a continuous tractive effort of 39,600 lbf (176 kN) at 12.6 mph (20.3 km/h). Unusually for a British diesel locomotive, the D600s had spoked wheels. They could work in multiple with each other or up to two D6300 locomotives using the orange square coupling code.

== Service and liveries ==
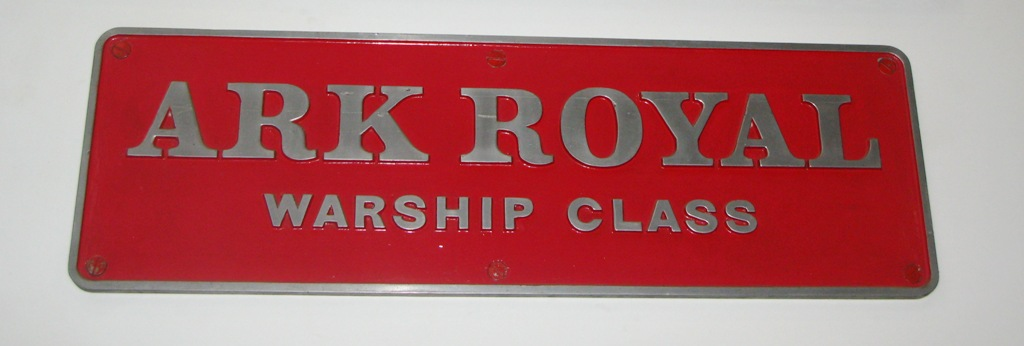
The nameplate of D601 Ark Royal on display at the National Railway Museum. These were generally coloured red, but this was changed to black if the locomotive was repainted blue.

D600 was officially completed on 25 November 1957 but was not handed over to BR until that December. Some trial runs with passenger coaches were done in south-west Scotland before D600 was allocated to Swindon in January 1958. A press run was arranged for 17 February 1958 when D600 hauled a 340-ton train between London Paddington and Bristol Temple Meads with stops at Reading, Didcot and Swindon.

D601 appeared in March 1958 and was also initially allocated to Swindon. By June 1958, both were based at Plymouth Laira and D602-D604 were then allocated there from new. The allocation of all five locomotives in July 1967 was Laira.

Entering service between January 1958 and January 1959, the class initially worked on the London-Plymouth-Penzance route of the Western Region. On 16 June 1958 D601 hauled the Cornish Riviera Express non-stop from Paddington to Plymouth—the first diesel locomotive to do so. The maximum permitted loads for a D600 on such a run were 375 tons (381 tonnes) westbound (climbing the 1-in-37 of Dainton Bank, west of Newton Abbot, and up Hemerdon Bank's 1-in-42 in the opposite direction). The D600s continued on the fast Bristol/West of England trains until a dozen D800 Warships had been accepted into service. Later they were largely restricted to the line west of Plymouth, finally being withdrawn en bloc in December 1967. They were noted for being capable of over 90 mph (140 km/h) if worked well and did run at 100 mph (160 km/h) during their very early careers. D603 was damaged in an accident and was returned to NBL for repair in 1960: the cast light alloy cabs were replaced with sheet steel as the original NBL subcontractor for these items was not prepared to fabricate a small, one-off order. Swindon had a spare cab which was not used and survived long after the locos had been withdrawn before finally being sold for scrap.

From new the D600s wore standard BR green with a 4-inch (102 mm) light grey horizontal band between the cabs a few inches above the solebar. By the time of withdrawal D600 was in all-over rail blue with full yellow ends, D602 was blue with small yellow warning panels on each nose and D601/3/4 were still green, albeit with yellow warning panels.

== Withdrawal and scrapping ==
All five locomotives were withdrawn on 30 December 1967. By this time they were non-standard, even for hydraulic designs, although according to Laira staff reliability was not a problem as many have thought. BR had been ordered to reduce the number of mainline locomotive classes from 28 to 15 by 1974, primarily by eliminating types which were known to be unreliable, had high maintenance costs or were so few in number as to be non-standard. As the table below shows, there was a substantial gap between delivery of D601 and D602 because NBL had to equip itself to construct the engines and transmissions for these three locomotives. By then the first Swindon-built D800s (later Class 42) had entered service, these being the lightweight and more powerful diesel-hydraulic locomotives they had requested.

D600 and D601 were sold to Woodham Brothers scrapyard in Barry, South Wales. D600 was broken up within a couple of years but D601 remained intact until 1980. Preservation for D601 was denied on the ground that it was too far gone to be restored to operational condition and was not considered to be worth preserving for display only. The last Class 41 unit was broken up at Barry Scrapyard, while D602-D604 were sold to Cashmore's of Newport who broke them up far sooner due to the former concentrating on easily processable wagons before locomotives. As the fleet only lasted eight years in revenue-earning service, D601 actually spent more time in the scrapyard than it did hauling trains on the main line.

No Class 41s were preserved, nor were any mainline North British diesel or electric products save for Class 84 25 kV AC electric locomotive No. 84001.

== Class details ==
Number	Name	Date to traffic	Date withdrawn	Scrapped	Notes
D600	Active	24 January 1958	30 December 1967	March 1970 at Woodhams, Barry	Date of order 16 November 1955; Maker's order no. L76.
D601	Ark Royal	28 March 1958	30 December 1967	July 1980 at Woodhams, Barry	
D602	Bulldog	3 November 1958	30 December 1967	November 1968 at Cashmore's, Newport	
D603	Conquest	21 November 1958	30 December 1967	November 1968 at Cashmore's, Newport	
D604	Cossack	20 January 1959	30 December 1967	September 1968 at Cashmore's, Newport	

== Modelling ==
A 00 gauge kit has been available from Silver Fox models and this was also available as a ready to run model (made to order but now discontinued). In 2019 Kernow Model Rail Centre released its limited edition OO RTR models of the class - D600 BR blue full yellow end & headcode boxes, D601 BR Green with headcode discs & original louvres, D602 BR blue yellow warning panel & headcode boxes, D602 BR Green with small warning panel & headcode boxes, D603 BR Green with yellow warning panels & headcode discs and D604 BR Green with headcode discs. An additional run is planned for November 2020 availability comprising previously un-released number/livery variations including a weathered green example.
