= Outline of British Rail =

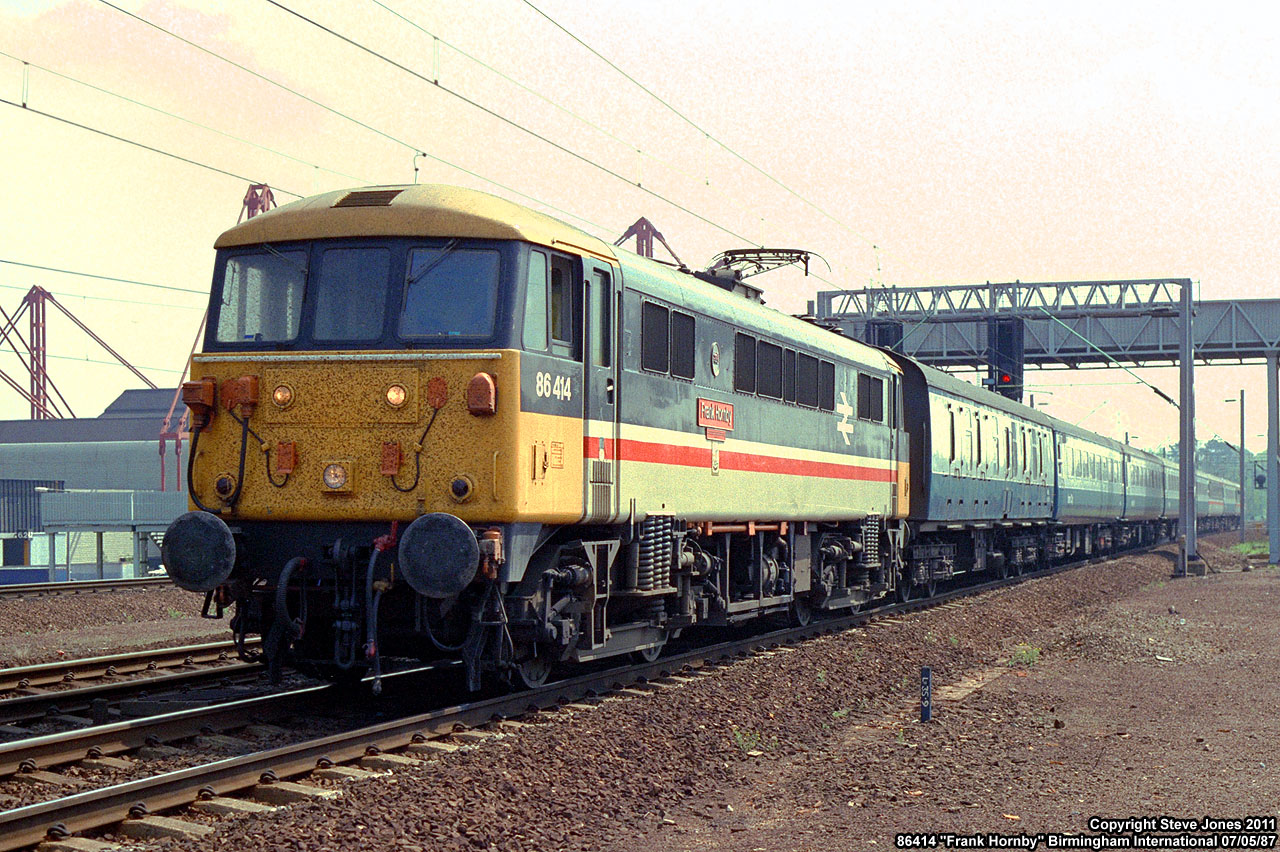
A British Rail Class 86 at Coventry in 1987

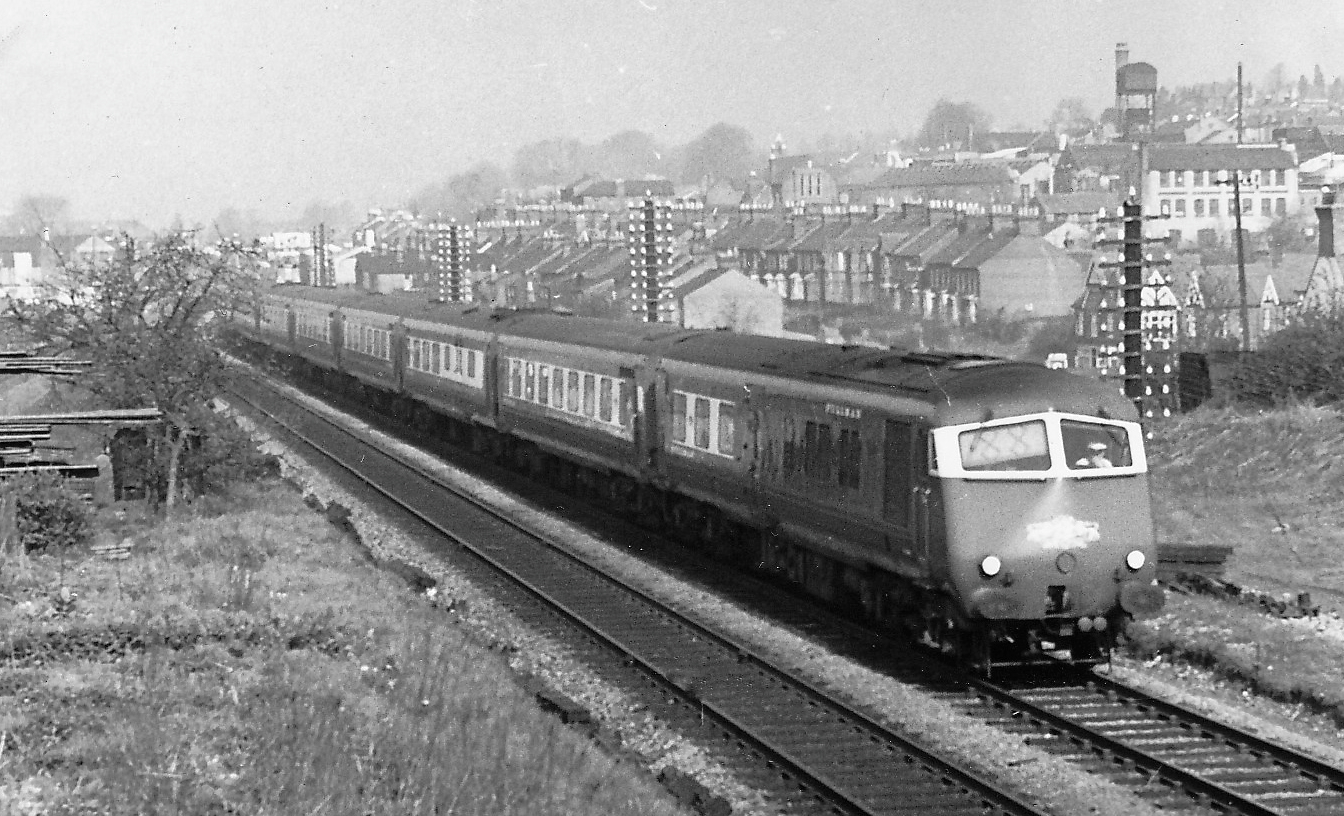
In the early days of British Railways, high-speed travel was limited to luxury Pullman trains.

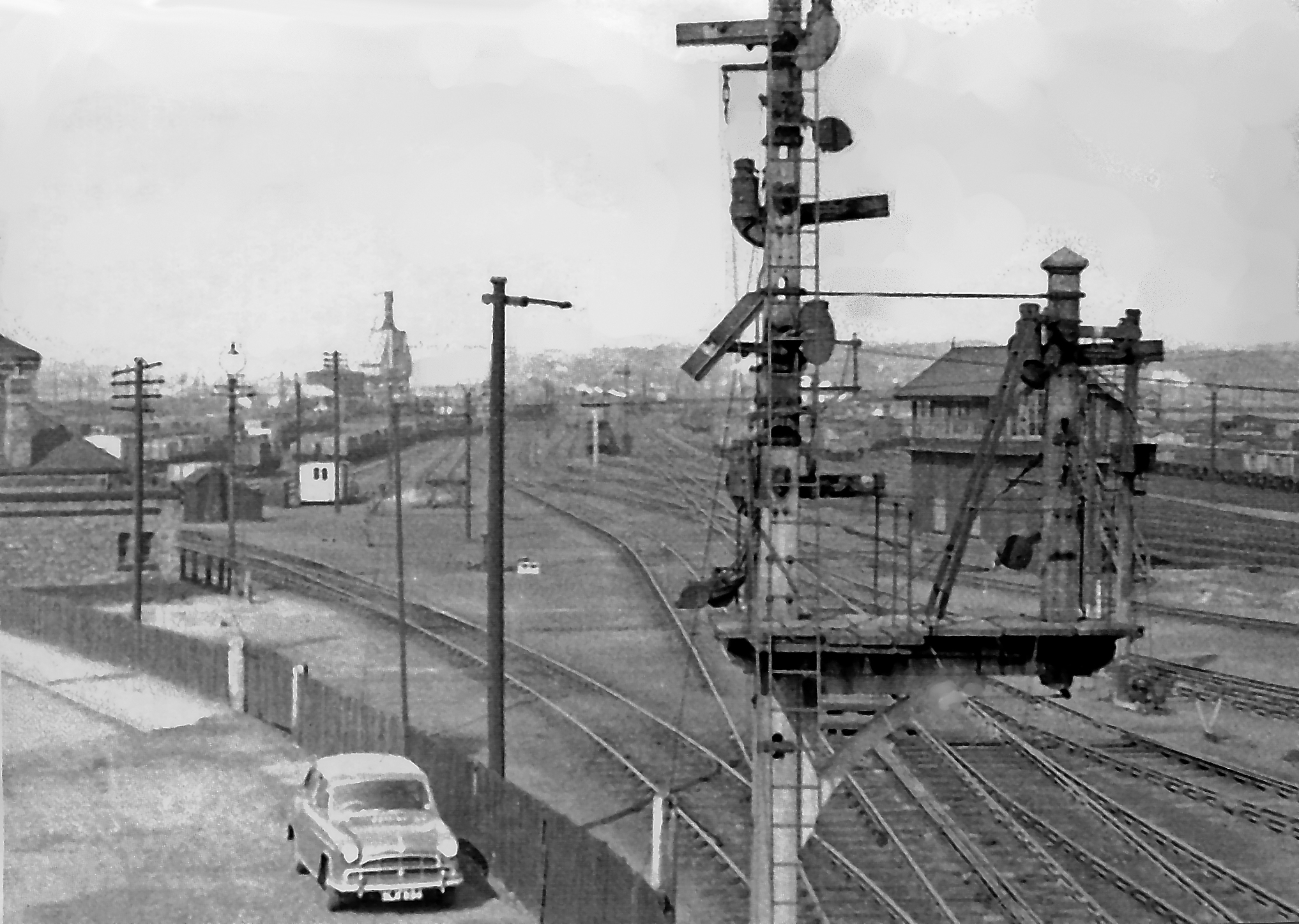
The marshalling yards were the epitomic failure of the 1955 Modernisation Plan.

The Double Arrow and Rail Alphabet formed part of the newly named British Rail's corporate identity.

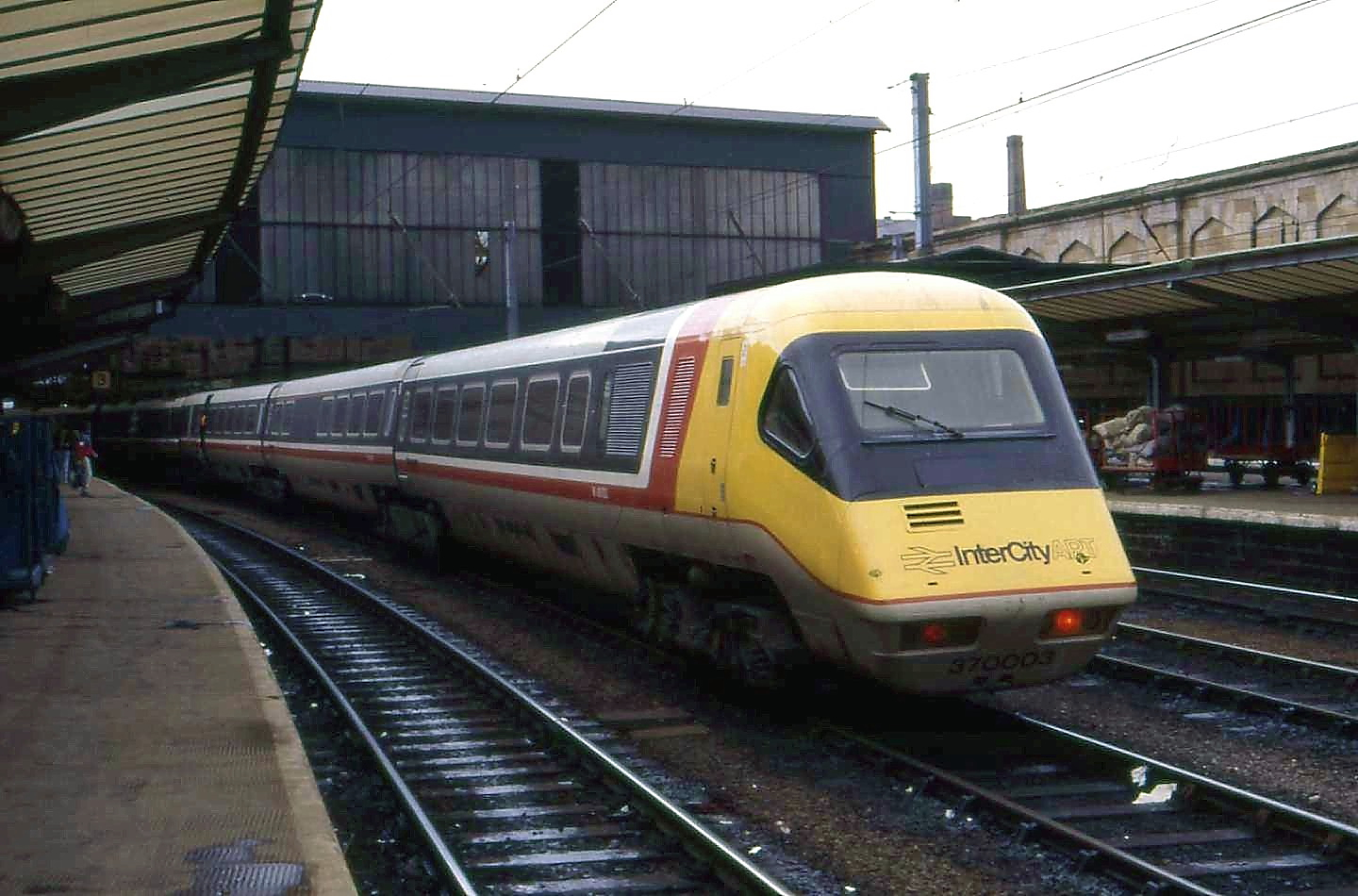
The Advanced Passenger Train was ultimately a failure, but it led to the successful InterCity 225.

British Rail (British Railways before 1965) was a state-owned company responsible for rail transport in Great Britain that was founded in 1948 until it became defunct in 1997.

== General ==
- Main article: British Rail
- Overview of history:
  - British Rail § History
  - History of rail transport in Great Britain 1948–1994

== History ==
=== Preceding ===
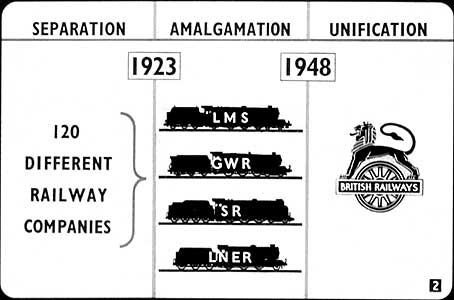
A diagram showing the amalgamation of companies via the Big Four into British Railways

- History of rail transport in Great Britain 1923–1947
- The Big Four – the four British railway companies who preceded British Rail:
  - Great Western Railway
  - London and North Eastern Railway
  - London, Midland and Scottish Railway
  - Southern Railway

=== 1940s ===
- Attlee ministry
- List of constituents of British Railways
- British Rail § Before 1948: The Big Four and nationalisation
- British Rail § 1948–1954: Early years
- History of rail transport in Great Britain 1948–1994 § The 1940s: Nationalisation

=== 1950s and 1960s ===
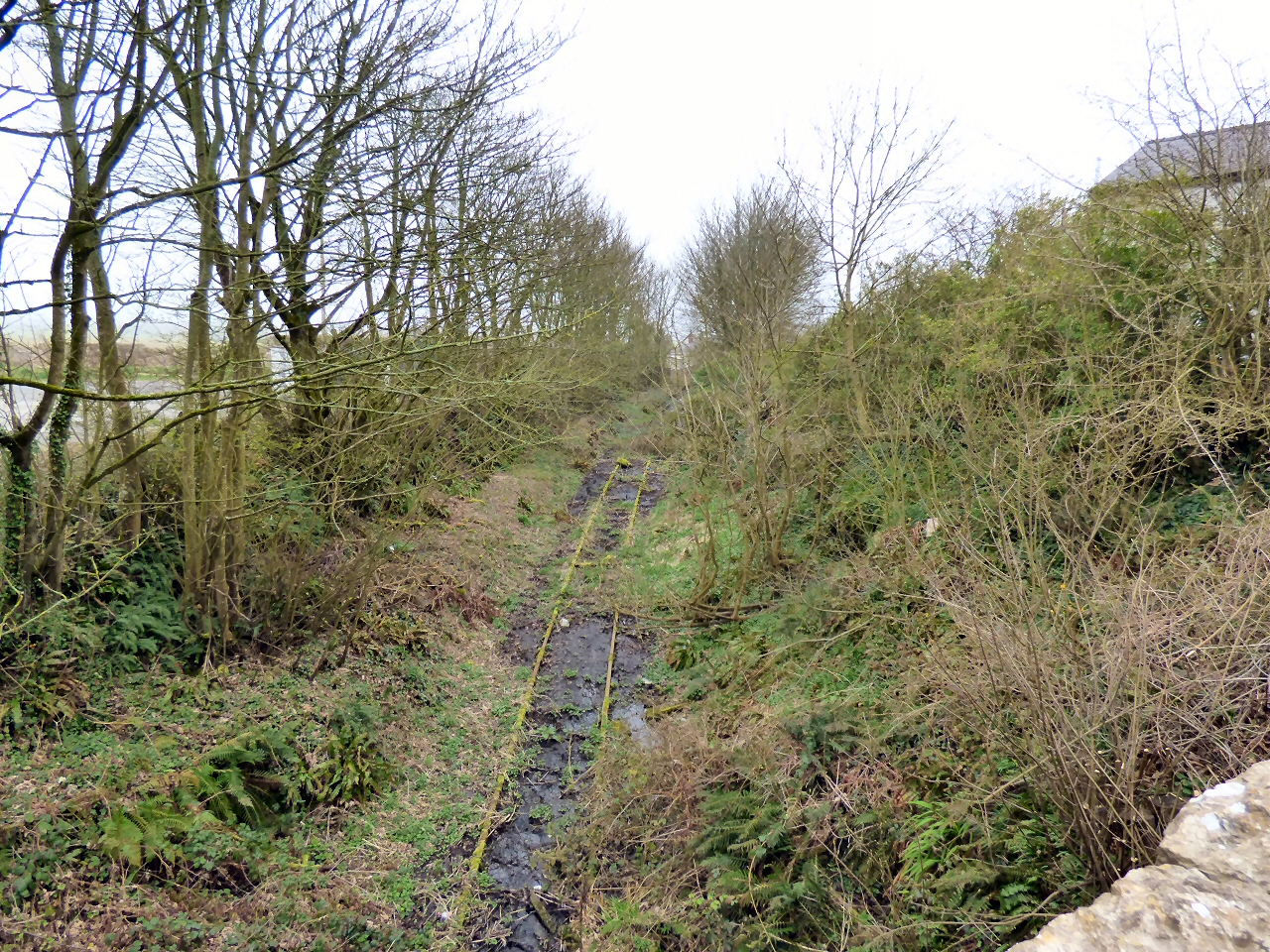
The Anglesey Central Railway was a victim of the Beeching Axe.

- The Modernisation Plan (1955)
- Stedeford Committee – supposedly independent committee used by Ernest Marples to justify his anti-rail measures
- The Beeching Reports (1961 and 1965)
- Beeching cuts
  - List of closed railway stations in Great Britain
  - List of closed railway lines in the United Kingdom
- British Rail § 1955–1960: The Modernisation Plan
- British Rail § 1961–1965: The Beeching era
- History of rail transport in Great Britain 1948–1994 § The 1950s: Modernisation
- History of rail transport in Great Britain 1948–1994 § The 1960s: Rationalisation

=== 1970s and 1980s ===
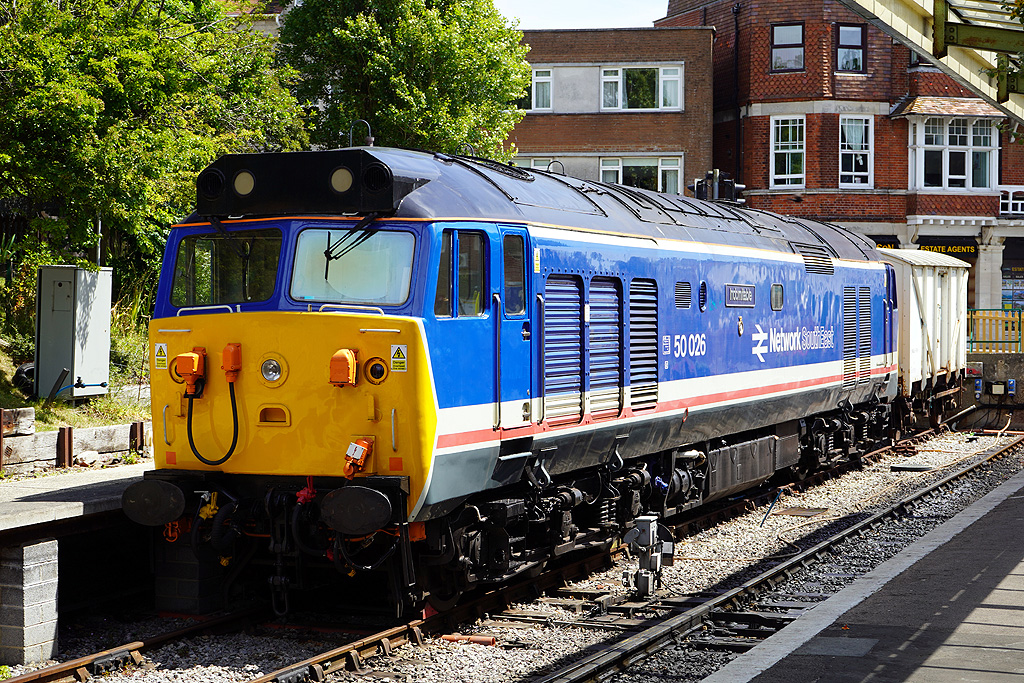
A British Rail Class 50 in a Network SouthEast livery

- Serpell Report (1982 and 1983) – anti-rail report, more extreme than Beeching's, which was by Margaret Thatcher shelved after huge backlash
- Sectorisation
  - InterCity (originally Inter-City)
  - Network SouthEast (originally London and South Eastern)
  - Regional Railways (originally Provincial)
- British Rail § 1966–1982: Effects of the Beeching Cuts
- British Rail § 1982–1991: Sectorisation
- History of rail transport in Great Britain 1948–1994 § The 1970s: HST and APT
- History of rail transport in Great Britain 1948–1994 § The 1980s: Sectorisation

=== 1990s ===
Privatisation has overseen a large increase in passenger usage of the railway network.

- History of rail transport in Great Britain 1995 to date
- Privatisation of British Rail
  - Impact of the privatisation of British Rail
  - Great British Railways – the planned state body to replace the system of privatisation
  - DfT Operator – rail holding company who has partially replaced franchises as a precursor to the creation of Great British Railways
- British Rail § 1992–1997: Privatisation
- History of rail transport in Great Britain 1948–1994 § The 1990s: Privatisation

== Structure ==
=== Regional structure ===
- Southern Region – former Southern Railway lines.
- Western Region – former Great Western Railway lines.
- London Midland Region – former London, Midland and Scottish Railway lines in England and Wales.
- Eastern Region – former London and North Eastern Railway lines south of York.
- Anglia Region – split from Eastern Region in 1988.
- North Eastern Region – former London and North Eastern Railway lines in England north of York.
- Scottish Region – all lines, regardless of the original company, in Scotland.

=== Sectorisation ===
- InterCity – express services
  - InterCity Sleeper – night train services
  - Gatwick Express – express service to/from Gatwick Airport
- Network SouthEast – London commuter services
  - Stansted Express – express service to/from Stansted Airport
- Regional Railways – regional services
  - Alphaline – enhanced regional express passenger services, added in 1994
  - ScotRail – regional and sub-intercity services in Scotland
  - TransPennine Express – sub-intercity services in the North
- Railfreight responsible for all freight operations, later subdivided into train operations
- Trainload Freight – trainload freight
- Railfreight Distribution – non-trainload freight
  - Speedlink a wagonload freight service utilising air-braked wagons
- Freightliner – intermodal traffic
- Rail Express Systems – parcels traffic

=== Classification and numbering schemes ===
- British carriage and wagon numbering and classification
- British Rail locomotive and multiple unit numbering and classification
- List of British Rail classes
- TOPS

=== Subsidiaries ===
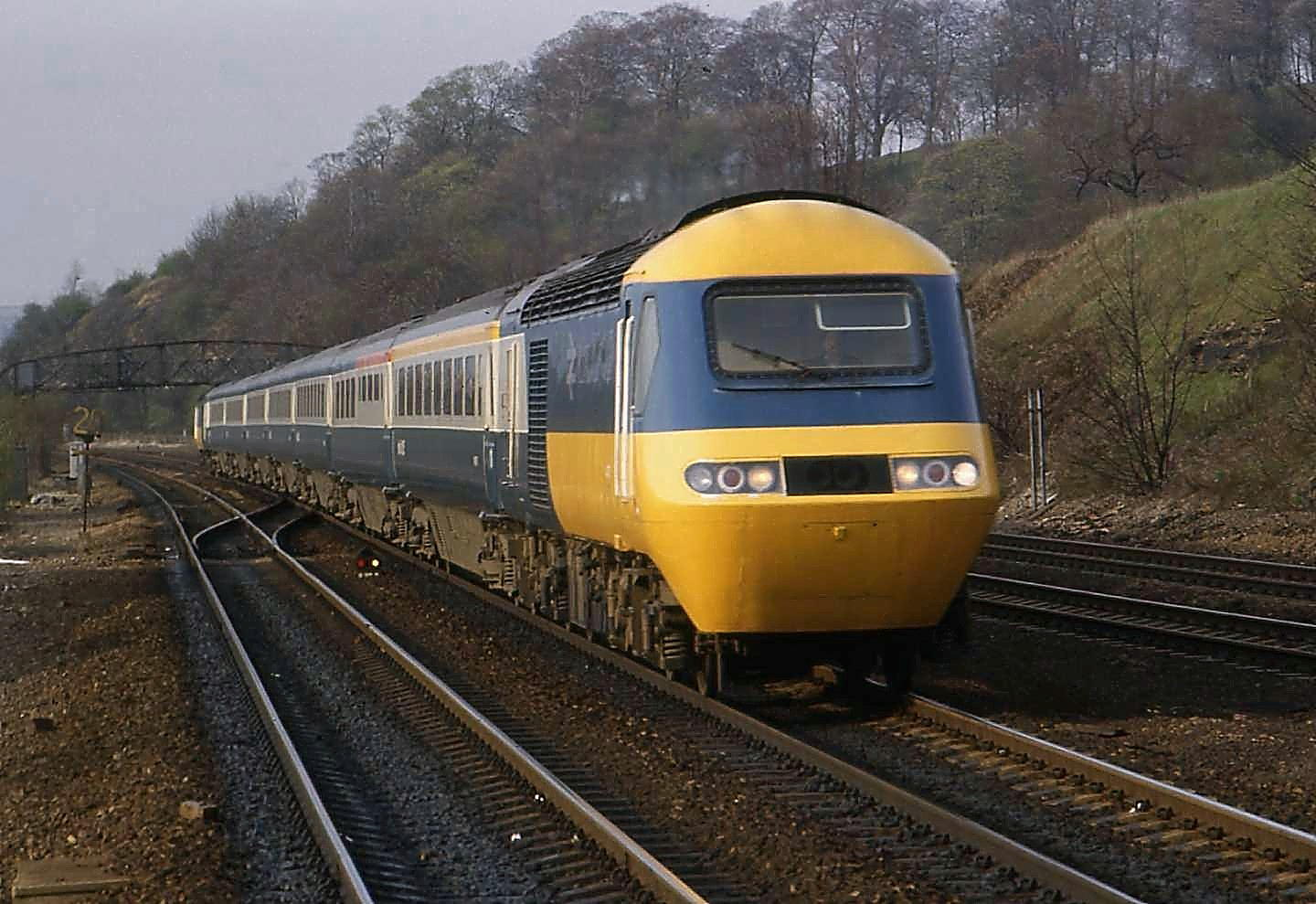
The InterCity 125 trainsets were built by British Rail Engineering Limited.

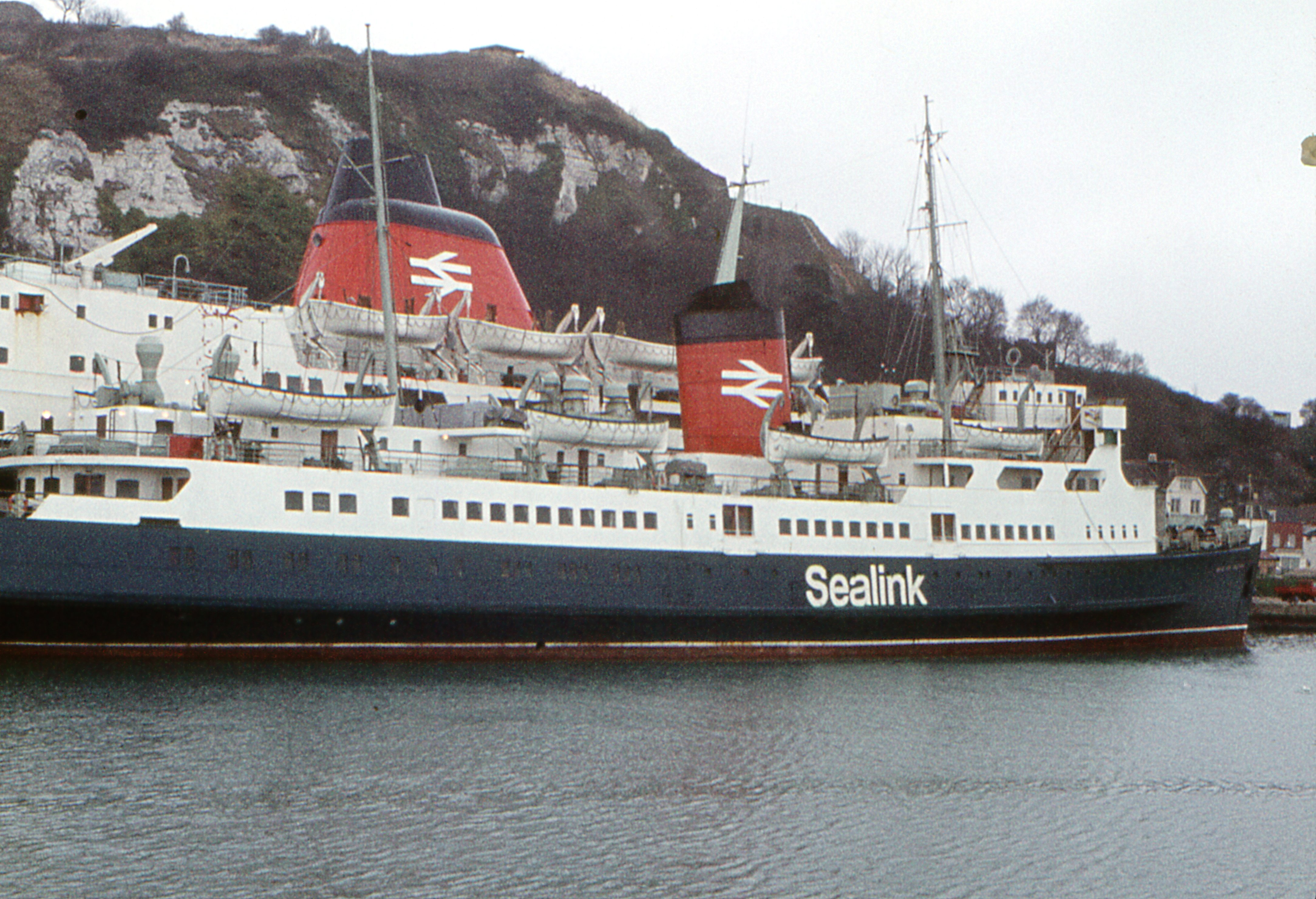
The ferry company Sealink formed part of British Rail.

- British Rail Engineering Limited (BREL) – replaced British Rail's own Workshops Division, and responsible for design and manufacture of train sets (1969–1989)
- British Railways ships
  - Sealink – ferry company that operated as a subsidiary of British Rail
- British Transport Commission Police, later the British Transport Police
- Travellers-Fare – on-train catering brand from the 1970s
- British Transport Hotels – operated hotels at train stations

== Branding and media ==
- British Rail § Branding and media
- British Rail brand names
- British Rail corporate liveries
- British Transport Films
- Advertisements:
  - Night Mail (advert) – 1988 television advert
  - The Age of the Train – 1970s advertising campaign
- Unified corporate identity
  - British Rail Double Arrow
  - Rail Alphabet – sans-serif typeface designed to increase readability
  - British Rail corporate liveries § Rail Blue
  - Design Research Unit – responsible for the Double Arrow and change of trade name

== Rolling stock ==
- Locomotives by time period:
  - List of LMS locomotives as of 31 December 1947
  - List of LNER locomotives as of 31 December 1947
  - List of British Railways steam locomotives as of 31 December 1967
- List of British Rail classes
  - List of British Rail departmental multiple unit classes
  - List of British Rail diesel multiple unit classes
  - List of British Rail electric multiple unit classes
  - List of British Rail modern traction locomotive classes
  - List of preserved British Rail diesel locomotives
  - List of British Rail unbuilt locomotive classes
- Rolling stock storage and maintenance
  - List of British Railways shed codes
  - List of British Rail TOPS depot codes

== Acts of parliament ==
This is a list of all acts of parliament between 1921 and 1994 that relate to the creation, running, or privatisation of British Rail, its subsidiaries, or its executives.

=== Preceding ===
- Railways Act 1921 – reduced all railway companies to the 'Big Four'.
- London Passenger Transport Act 1933 – created the London Passenger Transport Board as a separate transport authority for London

=== During ===
- Transport Act 1947 – nationalised rail services into British Rail
- Transport Act 1953 – dissolved the Railway Executive
- Transport Act 1962 – dissolved the British Transport Commission in preference of five new bodies
- British Railways Act 1966 – gave British Rail greater power to acquire land
- Transport Act 1968 – created the public service obligation grant and passenger transport executives
- Railways Act 1974 – executed amendments to railway legislation made necessary by the United Kingdom's accession to the European Union
- Transport Act 1962 (Amendment) Act 1981 – allowed British Rail to discontinue experimental services more easily
- Transport Act 1981 – an act primarily known for introducing compulsory seatbelts, but which also contained minor railway-related amendments such as in relation to railway fire safety.
- Transport (Finance) Act 1982 – legislated the United Kingdom's membership in the European Company for the Financing of Railroad Rolling Stock (EUROFIMA)
- Level Crossings Act 1983 – updated the necessary features and responsibilities in relation to level crossings
- Channel Tunnel Act 1987 – permitted the construction of the Channel Tunnel
- Transport and Works Act 1992 – ended the need for a private bill in order to construct a new section of line

=== Succeeding ===
- British Coal and British Rail (Transfer Proposals) Act 1993 – gave the government the power to sell parts of British Rail into the private sector
- Railways Act 1993 – set out the full privatisation of British Rail
- British Railways Act 1994 – increased the powers of British Rail to acquire land

== Personnel ==
=== Transport ministers ===
As a secretary of state:

- Alfred Barnes (1945–1951)
- John Maclay (1951–1952)
- Alan Lennox-Boyd (1952–1953)
- John Boyd-Carpenter (1954–1955)
- Harold Watkinson (1955–1959)
- Ernest Marples (1959–1964)
- Tom Fraser (1964–1965)
- Barbara Castle (1965–1968)
- Richard Marsh (1968–1969)
- Fred Mulley (1969–1970)
- John Peyton (1970)

As a junior minister:

- John Peyton (1970–1974)
- Fred Mulley (1974–1975)
- John Gilbert (1975–1976)

As a secretary of state:

- Bill Rodgers (1976–1979)
- Norman Fowler (1979–1981)
- David Howell (1981–1983)
- Tom King (1983)
- Nicholas Ridley (1983–1986)
- John Moore (1986–1987)
- Paul Channon (1987–1989)
- Cecil Parkinson (1989–1990)
- Malcolm Rifkind (1990–1992)
- John MacGregor (1992–1994)
- Brian Mawhinney (1994–1995)
- Sir George Young, 6th Baronet (1995–1997)

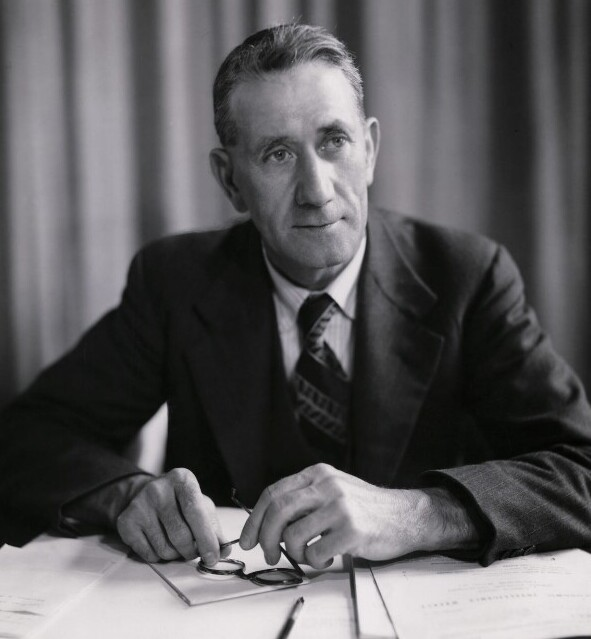
Alfred Barnes was the first transport minister to oversee British Railways.

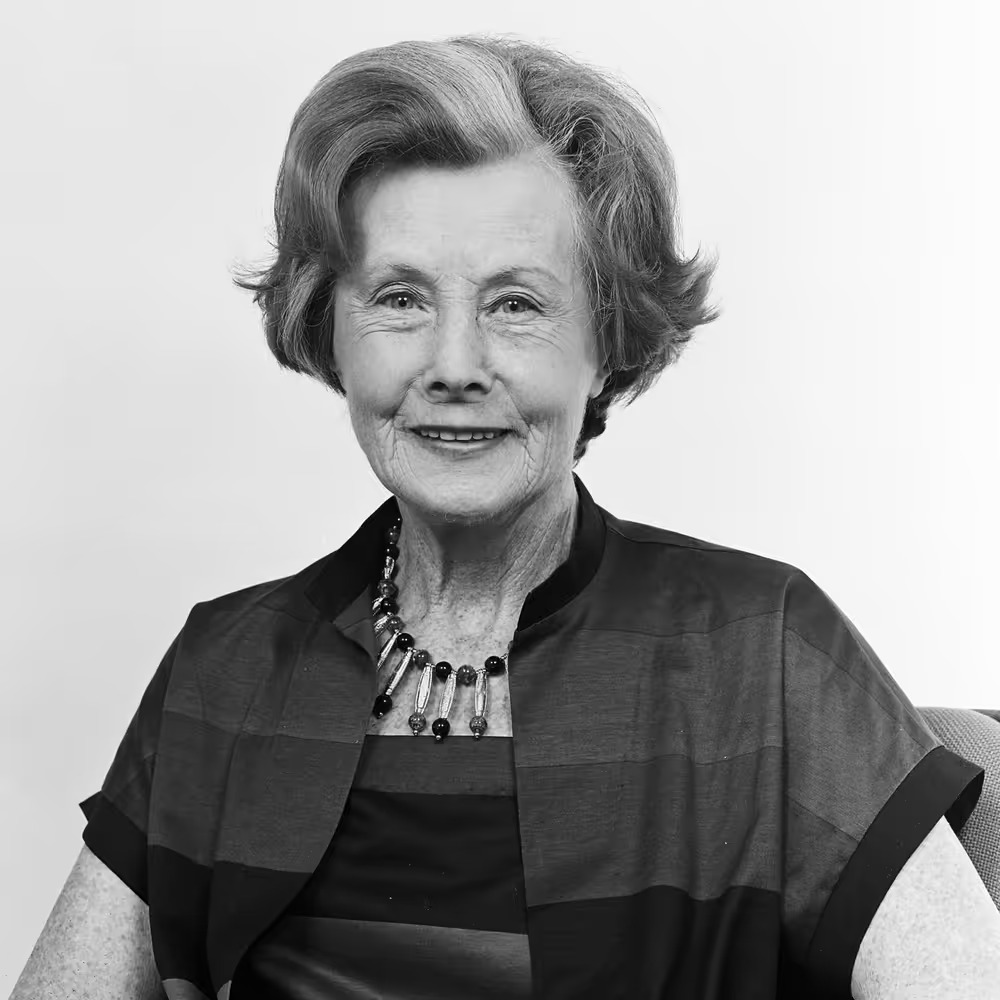
Barbara Castle was much more invested in the railways than her two immediate predecessors, but saw the Beeching Cuts as irreversible.

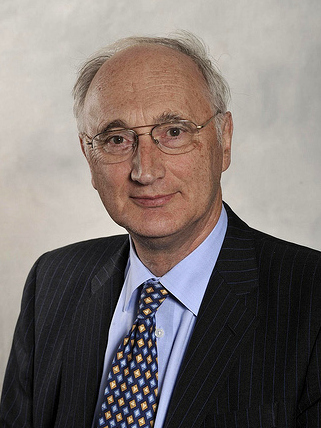
Sir George Young was the transport minister at the end of British Rail's privatisation

==== Timeline ====
- Labour
- Conservative
Alfred Barnes
John Maclay
Alan Lennox-Boyd
John Boyd-Carpenter
Harold Watkinson
Ernest Marples
Tom Fraser
Barbara Castle
Richard Marsh
Fred Mulley
John Peyton
Fred Mulley
John Gilbert
Bill Rodgers
Norman Fowler
David Howell
Tom King
Nicholas Ridley
John Moore
Paul Channon
Cecil Parkinson
Malcolm Rifkind
John MacGregor
Brian Mawhinney
Sir George Young, 6th Baronet
│
1940
│
1950
│
1960
│
1970
│
1980
│
1990
│
2000
│
2010
Transport ministers, 1945–1997

=== Board chairmen ===
Chairmen of the Railway Executive:

- Sir Eustace Missenden (1948–1951)
- Sir John Elliot (1951–1953)

Chairmen of the British Transport Commission:

- Sir Cyril Hurcomb (1948–1953)
- Sir Brian Robertson (1953–1961)
- Dr Richard Beeching (1961–1963)

Chairmen of the British Railways Board:

- Dr Richard Beeching (1963–1965)
- Sir Stanley Raymond (1965–1967)
- Sir Henry Johnson (1967–1971)
- Sir Richard Marsh (1971–1976)
- Sir Peter Parker (1976–1983)
- Sir Robert Reid (1983–1990)
- Sir Bob Reid (1990–1995)
- John Welsby (1995–1999)

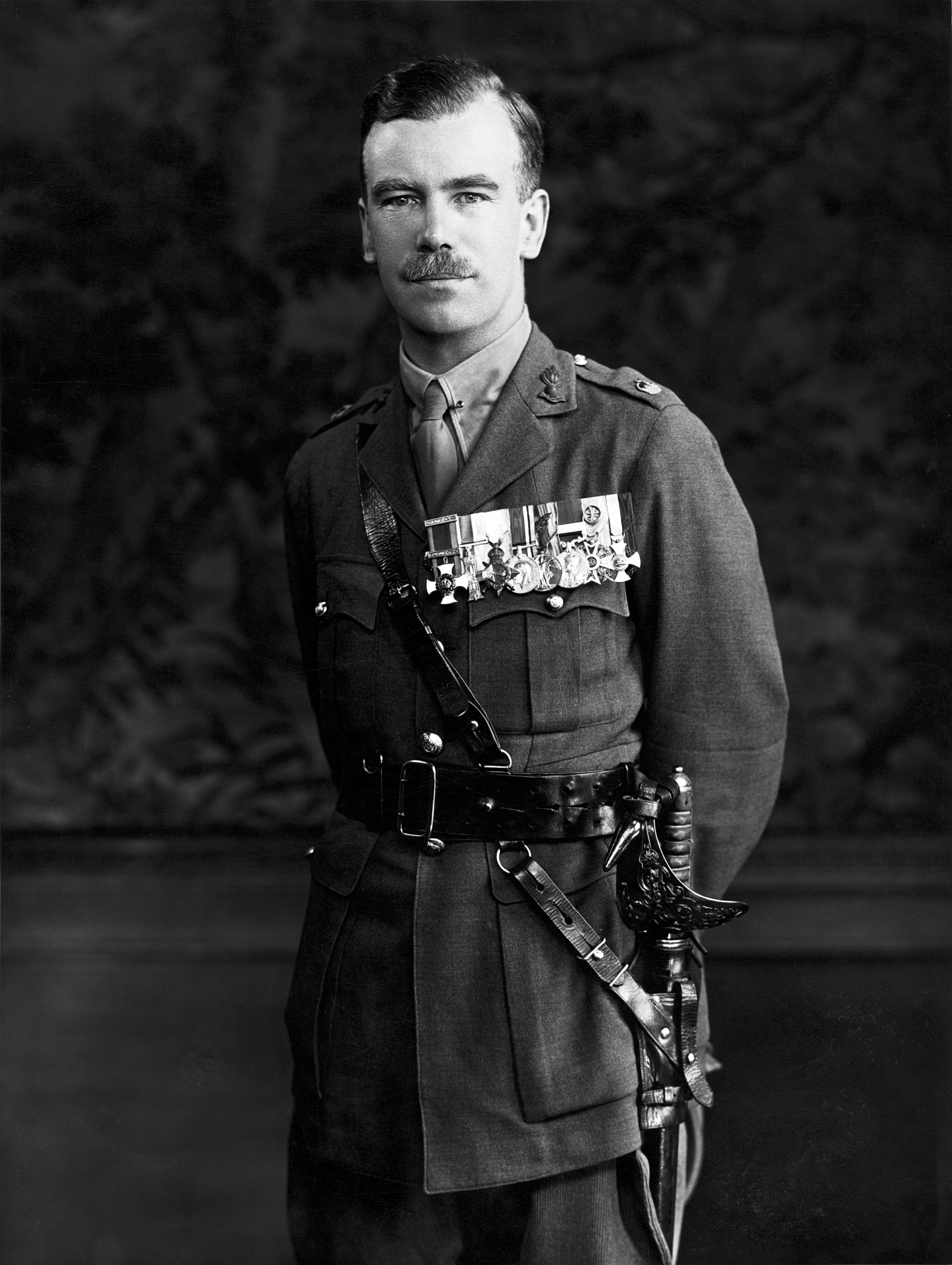
Sir Brian Robertson, Chairman of the British Transport Commission 1953–1961

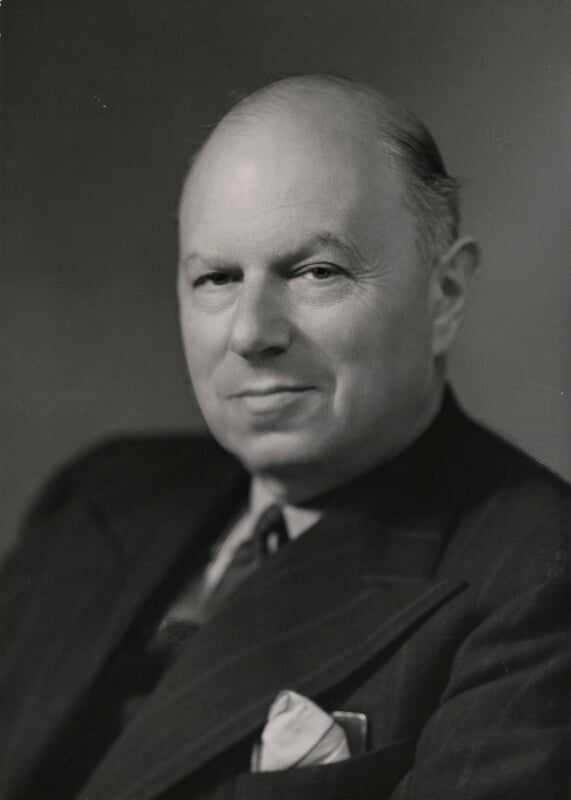
Sir John Elliot, Chairman of the Railway Executive 1951–1953

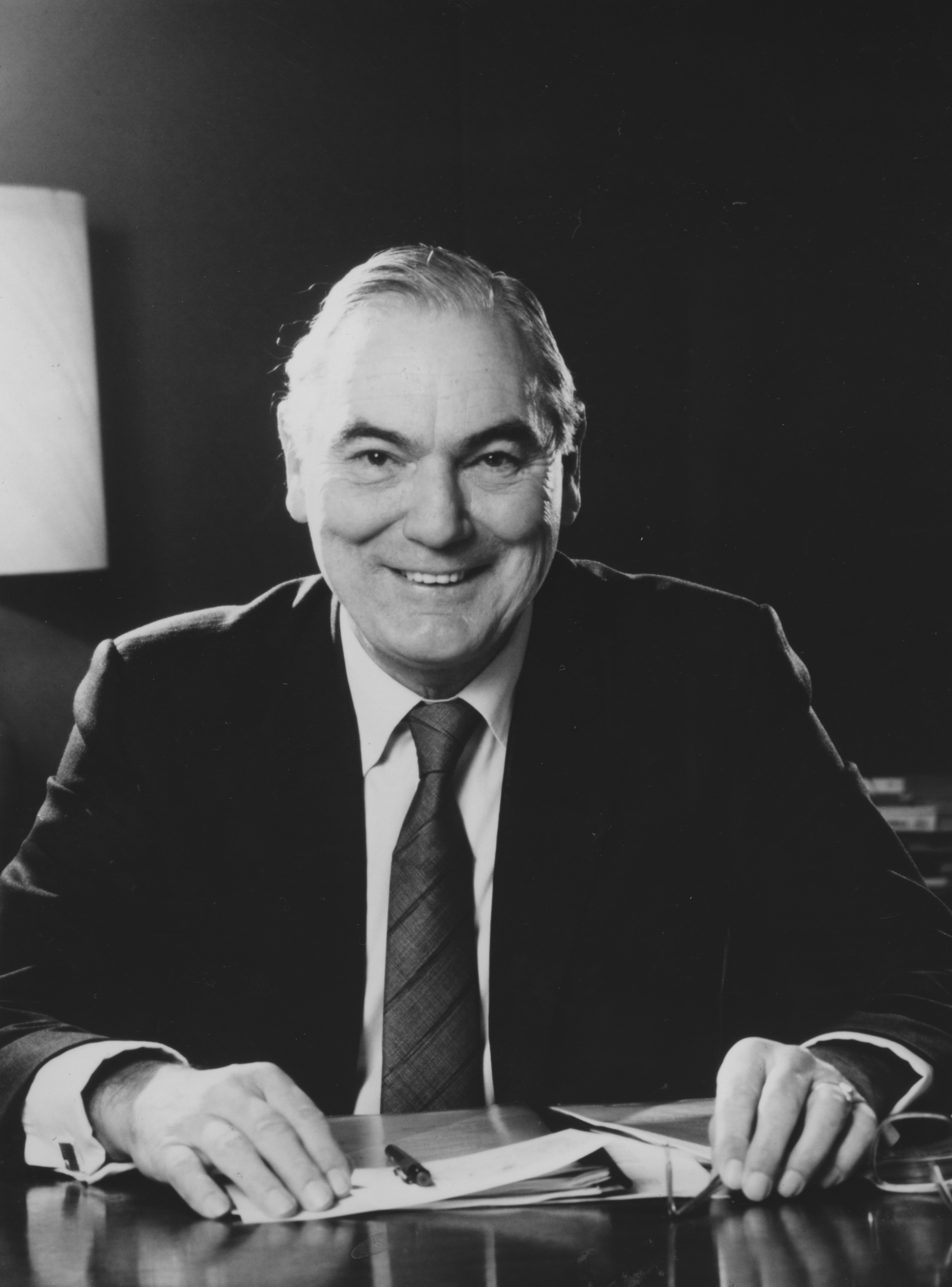
Sir Peter Parker, Chairman of the British Railways Board 1976–1983

==== Timeline ====
- British Transport Commission
- Railway Executive
- British Railways Board
Sir Eustace Missenden
Sir John Elliot
Sir Cyril Hurcomb
Sir Brian Robertson
Dr Richard Beeching
Sir Stanley Raymond
Sir Henry Johnson
Sir Richard Marsh
Sir Peter Parker
Sir Robert Reid
Sir Bob Reid
John Welsby
│
1940
│
1950
│
1960
│
1970
│
1980
│
1990
│
2000
│
2010
Executive body chairmen, 1948–1999

== Accidents and incidents ==
- List of accidents on British Rail
- List of rail accidents in the United Kingdom § 1948–1994: British Railways/Rail

=== Individual accidents and incidents ===
- Barnes (1955)
- Castlecary (1968)
- Colwich (1986)
- Coppenhall Junction (1962)
- Dagenham East (1958)
- Doncaster (1951)
- Ealing (1973)
- Eastbourne (1958)
- Eccles (1984)
- Eltham Well Hall (1972)
- Glanrhyd Bridge (1987)
- Harrow and Wealdstone (1952)
- Hither Green (1967)
- Hixon (1968)
- Invergowrie (1979)
- Irk Valley Junction (1953)
- Knowle and Dorridge (1963)
- Lewisham (1957)
- Lockington (1986)
- Milton (1955)
- Nuneaton (1975)
- Penmanshiel Tunnel (1979)
- Polmont (1984)
- Morpeth (1969, 1984)
- Severn Tunnel (1991)
- Stechford (1967)
- Summit Tunnel (1984)
- Sutton Coldfield (1955)
- Thirsk (1967)
- Weedon (1951)
- Welwyn Garden City (1957)
- Winsford (1948)

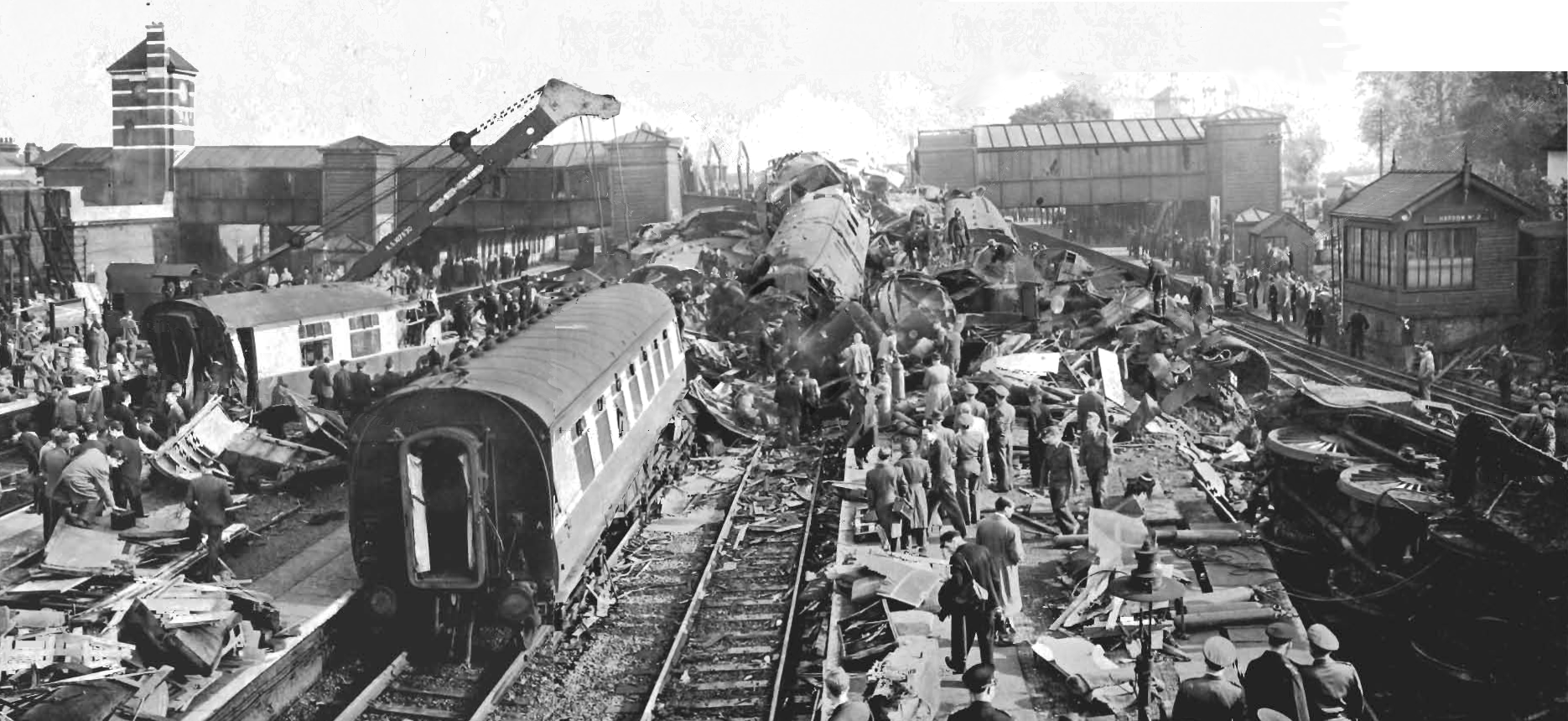
Harrow and Wealdstone, 1952

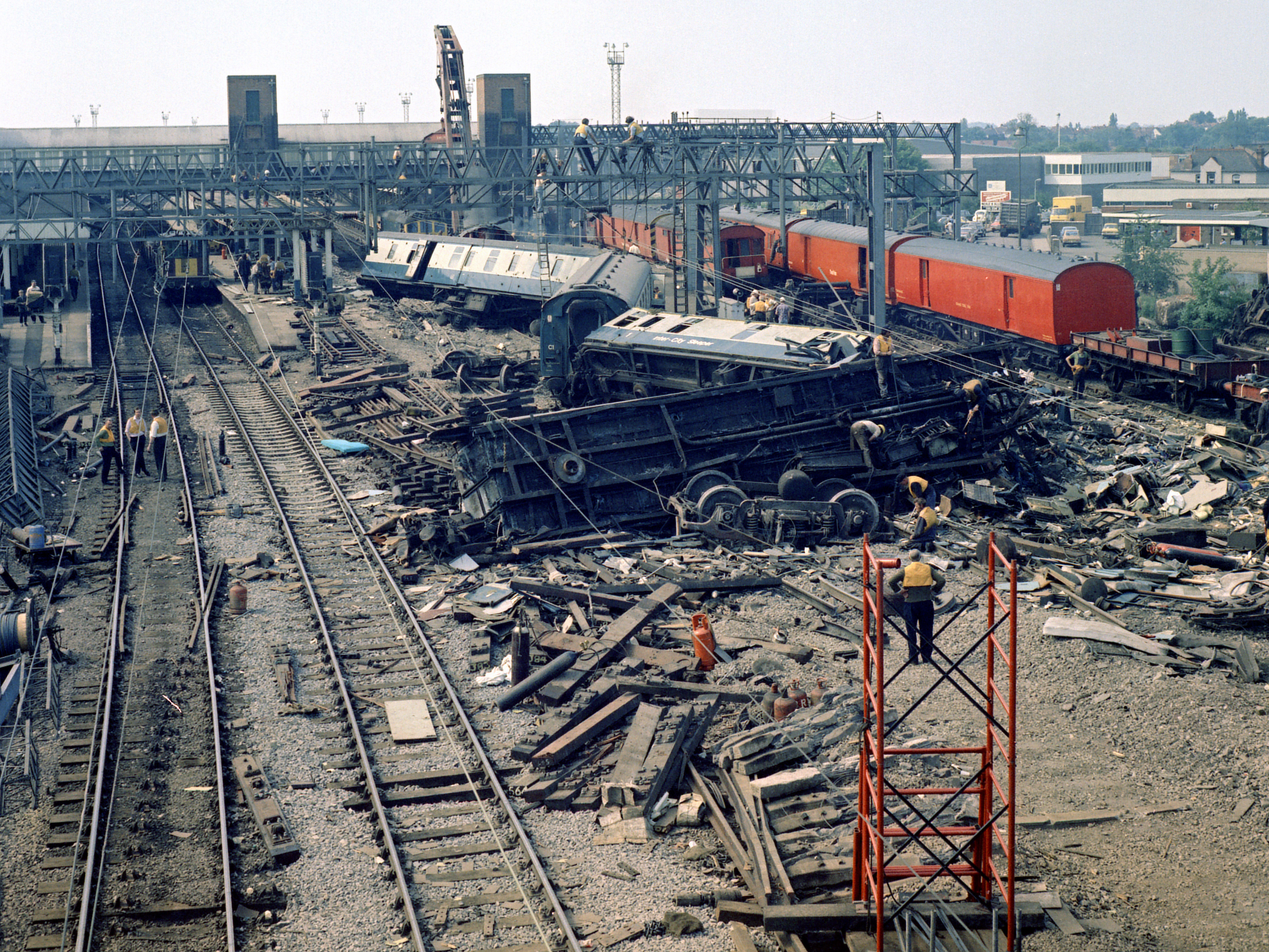
Nuneaton, 1975

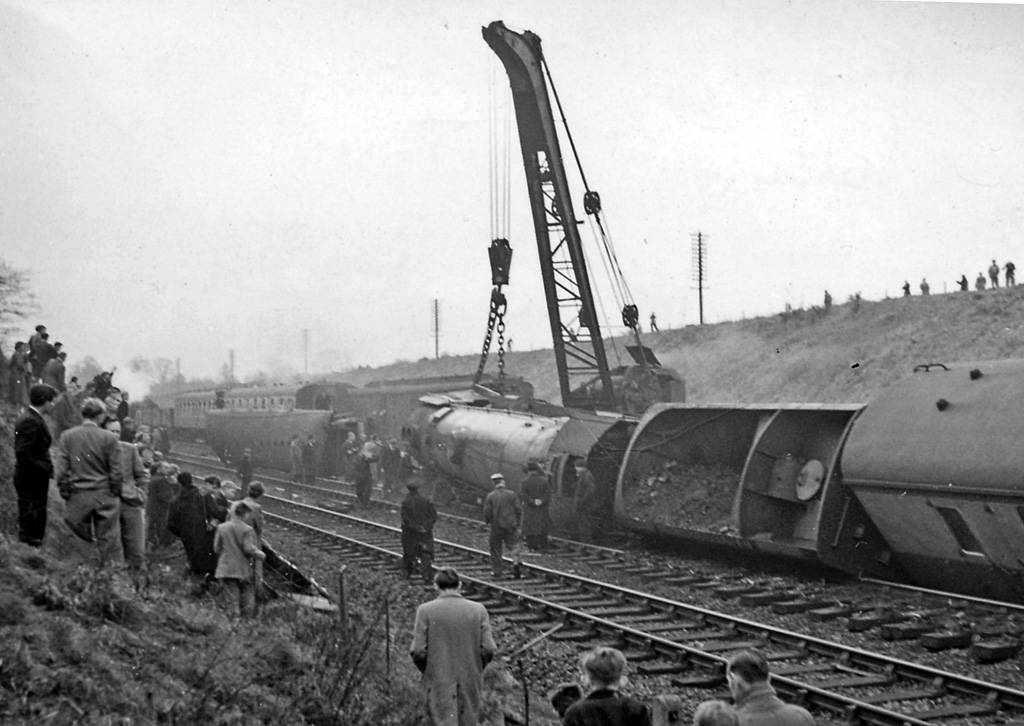
Welwyn Garden City, 1957

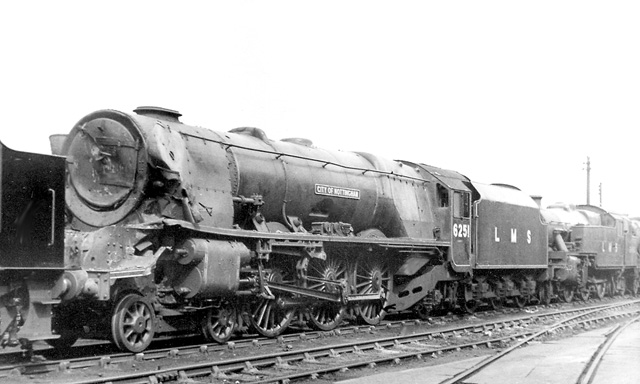
Winsford, 1948

== Successor companies ==
=== Passenger transport ===
The original passenger franchisees that succeeded British Rail were:

- Anglia Railways
- Arriva Trains Merseyside
- Arriva Trains Northern
- Central Trains
- Chiltern Railways
- Connex South Central
- Connex South Eastern
- c2c
- First Great Eastern
- First Great Western
- First North Western
- Gatwick Express
- GNER
- Island Line
- Midland Mainline
- ScotRail
- Silverlink
- South West Trains
- Thames Trains
- Thameslink
- Valley Lines
- Virgin CrossCountry
- Virgin Trains West Coast
- WAGN
- Wales & West

=== Freight and parcels ===
- Trainload Freight was originally intended to be sold as three separate regional entities, but all were bought by North and South Railways (NSR), which then became English Welsh and Scottish Railway (EWS)
- Railfreight Distribution was split into Freightliner, which remained an independent company, and "Channel Tunnel", which was then sold to EWS in March 1997.
- Rail Express Systems (parcels) was sold to NSR in December 1995

On 28 June 2007, Deutsche Bahn announced it had agreed to purchase EWS, and so it became DB Cargo UK.

=== Other ===
- Railtrack – infrastructure and stations
- Waterloo & City line – became part of the London Underground in April 1994.
- BRB (Residuary) Limited – all other responsibilities of the BRB not released elsewhere

== Image and legacy ==
- The wrong type of snow – a phrase used by British Rail to explain its service quality during one particular period of snow, which has become a general term for poor or lazy excuses.
- British Rail sandwich – often cited as the epitome of the perceived poor quality and hospitality of British Rail

== Other ==
- British Rail flying saucer
- British Transport Police
- Channel Tunnel
- National Association of Railway Clubs

== Primary sources ==
=== Legislation ===
References to legislation are represented with a double dagger (‡).

=== Reports ===
References to official reports, including accident reports, are represented with a reference mark (※).

== Secondary sources ==
=== Bibliography ===
- Wolmar, Christian (2022). British Rail: the Making and Breaking of Our Trains. Penguin. ISBN 978-1405946-27-8.
- Height, Frank; Cresswell, Roy (1979). Design for Passenger Transport. Pergamon. p. 118. ISBN 978-1-4831-5309-4.
- Jackson, Tanya (2013). British Railways: The Nation's Railway. Stroud: The History Press. ISBN 978-0-7524-9742-6.
- Gourvish, Terry; Blake, N (1986). British Railways, 1948–73: a business history. Cambridge University Press. pp. 286–290.
