= 1962 South Dorset by-election =

UK parliamentary by-election

The 1962 South Dorset by-election occurred following the death of George Montagu, 9th Earl of Sandwich on 15 June 1962. His son Viscount Hinchingbrooke, the incumbent MP for the constituency of South Dorset, was subsequently elevated to the peerage, becoming the 10th Earl of Sandwich. Following the Peerage Act 1963, the 10th Earl disclaimed his peerages in 1964, becoming Victor Montagu, but never sat in the House of Commons again.

== Candidates ==
The campaign coincided with a period when the United Kingdom was negotiating to join the European Communities ("Common Market"). The application was later vetoed by Charles de Gaulle in 1963. Viscount Hinchingbrooke was staunchly against joining the Common Market, while the Conservative candidate, Angus Maude, had to back the official party pro-Common Market policy. The issue resulted in a local Conservative, Sir Piers Debenham, standing as an anti-Common Market candidate with the support of Viscount Hinchingbrooke.

Burn, Fudge and O'Connor were all serving in the Armed Forces, and stood to avail of the automatic military discharge for Parliamentary candidates publicised by Malcolm Thompson at the Middlesbrough West by-election the previous July.

A total of seven candidates stood for election; this matched the then by-election record, which had been set at the 1920 Stockport by-election, and was not beaten until the 1976 Walsall North by-election.

== Result ==
The by-election took place on 22 November 1962, and resulted in a gain for the Labour Party from the Conservatives. Guy Barnett was elected with a majority of 704, overturning a 6,693 Conservative majority at the 1959 general election, and with 33.5% of the poll, one of the lowest winning vote-shares at a by-election vote. The 5,000 votes for Piers Debenham proved decisive, although the increase in the Liberal Party vote was also important. Debenham lost his deposit, gaining 12.3% of the votes against the 12.5% required.

Angus Maude was subsequently elected to Parliament in the Stratford by-election in 1963, after the resignation of John Profumo following the Profumo affair. At the 1964 general election Guy Barnett was defeated by the Conservative candidate Evelyn King by 935 votes. He returned to parliament in 1971, for Greenwich, following a by-election there. Piers Debenham died in 1964, just before the 1964 general election.

South Dorset by-election, 22 November 1962
Party	Candidate	Votes	%	±%
Labour	Guy Barnett	13,783	33.51	−1.16
Conservative	Angus Maude	13,079	31.79	−17.99
Liberal	Lawrence Norbury-Williams	8,910	21.66	+6.11
Anti Common Market	Piers Debenham	5,057	12.29	New
Independent	Paul Burn	181	0.44	New
Independent	Michael Fudge	82	0.20	New
Independent	Jeremiah O'Connor	45	0.11	New
Majority		704	1.71	N/A
Turnout		41,137		
Labour gain from Conservative		Swing		
