= Rosie Barnes =

English politician (born 1946)

Rosie Barnes OBE

Member of Parliament for Greenwich
- In office 26 February 1987 – 16 March 1992
- Preceded by: Guy Barnett
- Succeeded by: Nick Raynsford

Personal details
- Born: Rosemary Susan Allen; 16 May 1946 (age 79) Nottingham, England
- Party: Independent (after 1990)
- Other political affiliations: SDP (1981–1988) 'Continuing' SDP (1988–1990)

Rosemary Susan Barnes, OBE (née Allen; born 16 May 1946) is an English charity organiser and former politician. She became nationally known when she won a by-election in 1987 for the Social Democratic Party.

== Early life ==
Rosemary Allen was born in Nottingham to Alan Allen and Kathleen Allen and was educated at Bilborough Grammar School (Bilborough College since 1975), gaining seven O-levels, and three A-levels. She is a cousin of Labour MP Graham Allen.

At the University of Birmingham she graduated in Social Sciences and History in 1967. The same year she married Graham Barnes, an old school friend from Bilborough Grammar School, who later became an accountant and investment company director. They have two sons and one daughter. After briefly becoming a teacher, she worked as a freelance market research consultant. In the late 1960s she lived in Balham and Streatham.

== Political activity ==
Having been a Labour voter, although never a member, when the Social Democratic Party (SDP) was formed in 1981 Barnes and her husband joined it as founder members because they were opposed to the Labour Party's leftward move. She served on the Council for Social Democracy from 1982 as the delegate from Greenwich, and was an SDP candidate in Woolwich in the Inner London Education Authority elections in May 1986.

== Parliamentary candidature ==
Barnes was selected as SDP candidate for Greenwich in December 1986 after the previous candidate stood down, saying he did not want to be a "paper candidate" because the local SDP had decided to concentrate its efforts on keeping John Cartwright's seat in Woolwich. On Christmas Eve 1986, the Labour MP for the constituency (Guy Barnett) died, precipitating a by-election. The local Labour Party selected a left-wing candidate, and the Greenwich by-election held in February 1987 saw a deluge of canvassers, including many members of the Liberal Party, come from near and far to help her win the seat. Her husband, who in 1986 had become an SDP local councillor in Greenwich, acted as her agent at the subsequent 1987 general election four months later when she was returned.

== National figure ==
Becoming a political star at the general election by virtue of her 'non-partisan' appeal, the SDP decided to use Barnes prominently in its campaign. She was shown in soft focus in a Party political broadcast teaching her son the way to stroke a rabbit, an appearance which was heavily ridiculed. She retained her seat with a lower majority. Following the election, with the SDP split over whether to merge with the Liberal Party, Barnes strongly supported David Owen in his resistance to merger.

== Role in SDP ==
Rosie Barnes became a member of Dr Owen's 'continuing' SDP, but when the party was disbanded in 1990 she continued to sit in Parliament as an 'Independent Social Democrat'. In the 1992 general election, despite being actively aided by the local Liberal Democrat party who did not put up a candidate against her and canvassed for her, she lost her seat to Nick Raynsford of the Labour Party.

== After Parliament ==
After leaving politics Barnes became a charity director, first for the Royal College of Obstetricians and Gynaecologists at Birthright (which she renamed WellBeing), and subsequently as Chief Executive of the Cystic Fibrosis Trust which she joined in October 1996 and from which she retired in August 2010. In 2011 she accepted an invitation to become Patron of Child Health International, a charity dedicated to helping families affected by cystic fibrosis in former Soviet bloc countries.

== Honours ==
Barnes was appointed OBE for services to health care in 2011.

Parliament of the United Kingdom
| Preceded by Guy Barnett | Member of Parliament for Greenwich; 1987 – 1992 | Succeeded by Nick Raynsford |
