= 1987 Greenwich by-election =

UK Parliamentary by-election

- 26 February 1987

	First party	Second party	Third party
Candidate	Rosie Barnes	Deirdre Wood	John Antcliffe
Party	SDP	Labour	Conservative
Popular vote	18,287	11,676	3,852
Percentage	53.0%	33.8%	11.2%
Swing	▲27.9%	▼4.4%	▼23.6%
MP before election
Guy Barnett
Labour
Subsequent MP
Rosie Barnes
SDP

The 1987 Greenwich by-election was a by-election to the British House of Commons held on 26 February 1987, shortly before the 1987 general election. The election was caused by the death of Guy Barnett, Labour Party Member of Parliament for Greenwich on 24 December 1986.

== Background ==
Labour had held Greenwich since the 1945 general election, although their majority had declined in recent years, and in 1983, Barnett had achieved a majority of only 1,211 votes over the Conservative candidate. The then newly formed Social Democratic Party (SDP) had also stood, winning 25% of the vote. As a result, all three parties considered that they had a chance of taking the seat, but an early opinion poll suggested Labour would win, with the SDP/Alliance in a very poor third place.

== Candidates ==
The Labour Party selected Deirdre Wood as their candidate, regarded as a left-winger. This laid open the possibility of splitting the vote, as the Labour leadership were moving towards expelling far-left MPs and activists identified with the Militant tendency. Although Wood was not a Militant supporter, as a former GLC and sitting ILEA councillor she was close to the London left and she was heavily attacked in the press for her views.

Despite being the party in power, and on the back of their strong performance in 1983, the Conservatives appeared to have the least chance of taking the seat, but were hopeful of a strong performance in the run-up to the general election and selected John Antcliffe as their candidate.

The SDP had formed an alliance with the Liberal Party and could rely on their activists in the constituency canvassing for them. Despite winning 25.4% of the vote in the 1983 election, the Alliance had taken only 23 seats nationwide, and the SDP had not won a by-election since Portsmouth South in 1984. Due to this lacklustre performance, the party had decided to focus on holding neighbouring Woolwich in the forthcoming general election, rather than attempting to win Greenwich. Their original candidate for the seat in the general election withdrew in December 1986, objecting to being a "paper candidate", and the party instead selected Rosie Barnes, who they ran in the by-election. She had links in the constituency; her husband was a local councillor, who also acted as her election agent. The Liberal Party regarded the constituency as a possible gain for the SDP, and in support of this, flooded the constituency with activists.

The Green Party, British National Party, National Front and Revolutionary Communist Party also stood candidates. Comedian Malcolm Hardee also stood, for the Rainbow Alliance "Beer, Fags and Skittles Party".

== Campaign ==
An opinion poll in the last week of campaigning suggested that Labour would win, but that the SDP was now a close second and that the Conservatives would be third. This was exactly the result that the SDP/Alliance campaign needed, as it meant that many Conservative voters could be tempted to vote for the SDP in order to defeat Labour.

The by-election was held on 26 February 1987. During the afternoon and evening of polling day, SDP/Alliance workers called on known Conservative supporters to remind them that only their candidate could beat Labour. They did so in large numbers and the SDP gained the seat, their first gain from the Labour Party at an election (rather than by defection).

== Result ==
The SDP candidate (in alliance with the Liberal Party) won by a huge margin, an upset in a seat held by the Labour Party for over 50 years.

1987 Greenwich by-election
Party	Candidate	Votes	%	±%
SDP	Rosie Barnes	18,287	53.0	+27.9
Labour	Deirdre Wood	11,676	33.8	−4.4
Conservative	John Antcliffe	3,852	11.2	−23.6
Green	Graham Bell	264	0.8	New
Rainbow Dream Ticket	Malcolm Hardee	124	0.3	New
BNP	Ian Dell	116	0.3	−0.4
National Front	Joseph Pearce	103	0.3	New
Revolutionary Communist	Kate Marshall	91	0.3	New
Majority		6,611	19.2	N/A
Turnout		34,513	68.2	+0.5
SDP gain from Labour		Swing	+9.6	

== Previous election ==
General election 1983: Greenwich
Party	Candidate	Votes	%	±%
Labour	Guy Barnett	13,361	38.2	−13.9
Conservative	Arthur Rolfe	12,150	34.8	+1.5
SDP	Timothy Ford	8,783	25.1	+14.5
BNP	Ian Dell	259	0.7	New
Fellowship	Ronald Mallone	242	0.7	−0.6
Communist	F. Hooks	149	0.4	New
Majority		1,211	3.4	−15.4
Turnout		34,944	67.7	−2.9
Labour hold		Swing		

== Aftermath ==
Barnes held the seat at the general election that June, but lost it to Labour in 1992. It revived the SDP before the 1987 election, but in retrospect, the campaign could be seen as the 'high water mark' of the Alliance - it would be downhill from here. The SDP failed to make further gains in the 1987 general election, and the majority of the party joined with the Liberals to form the Liberal Democrats. As a result, the election was also the last time the SDP gained a seat.

Right-wing members of the parliamentary Labour Party blamed the selection of Wood, a left-winger, as seriously hampering Labour's chances of retaining the seat. They made the suggestion that the party leadership should by-pass involvement of local activists and directly appoint candidates in future by-elections. Labour leader Neil Kinnock balked at the idea and said that imposing candidates in electorates would be an "offence against democracy" and that those raising the idea were "political illiterates."
