= Guy Barnett (British politician) =

British politician (1928–1986)

Member of Parliament for Greenwich
- In office 8 July 1971 – 24 December 1986
- Preceded by: Richard Marsh
- Succeeded by: Rosie Barnes

Member of Parliament for South Dorset
- In office 15 June 1962 – 25 September 1964
- Preceded by: Victor Montagu
- Succeeded by: Evelyn King

Personal details
- Born: Nicolas Guy Barnett; 23 August 1928 London, England
- Died: 24 December 1986 (aged 58) London, England
- Party: Labour
- Spouse: Daphne Hortin (m. 1967)
- Children: 2
- Education: St Edmund Hall, Oxford (BA)

Nicolas Guy Barnett (23 August 1928 – 24 December 1986) was a British Labour Party politician. He was the Member of Parliament (MP) for South Dorset from a by-election victory in 1962 until he was unseated in 1964, and later for Greenwich from a 1971 by-election until his death.

== Background ==
Barnett was born in Dulwich in 1928. He was educated at Highgate School and St Edmund Hall, Oxford, where he read politics, philosophy and economics. While at Oxford, he became a Quaker, which The Times said was instrumental in developing his left-wing politics. Barnett taught at Queen Elizabeth Grammar School, Wakefield, from 1953 to 1959 and at Friends' School, Kamusinga, in Kenya, from 1960 to 1961. He then worked for various development charities, including Voluntary Service Overseas. He served in the Royal Air Force during his national service.

== Parliamentary career ==
After unsuccessfully contesting Scarborough and Whitby in 1959, Barnett was elected as the MP for South Dorset at a by-election in November 1962 after the sitting Conservative MP Victor Montagu succeeded to the peerage as the Earl of Sandwich. Barnett only held the seat briefly as he was defeated at the 1964 general election.

He was returned to Parliament as the MP for Greenwich at a by-election in July 1971, upon the resignation of the sitting Labour MP Richard Marsh to become chairman of British Rail, and held the seat until his death on Christmas Eve 1986. The subsequent by-election in February 1987 was won by the SDP candidate Rosie Barnes.

== Parliamentary offices ==
Guy Barnett was Parliamentary Under-Secretary of State, Department of the Environment, under Peter Shore, from 1976 to 1979 (when Labour lost that year's general election) and Joint Secretary of the Parliamentary Group on Overseas Development from 1984 to 1986.

He was a Member of the Parliamentary Select committee on Race Relations and Immigration from 1972 to 1974 and of the Public Accounts Committee in 1975.

He was a Member of the European Parliament from 1975 to 1976, as an appointed delegate of the UK Parliament.

== Other roles ==
He was a Member of the General Advisory Council of BBC from 1973 to 1976, served on the board of Christian Aid from 1984 to 1986, a Governor of the Institute of Development Studies from 1984 to 1986 and a Trustee of the National Maritime Museum, Greenwich from 1974 to 1976. He was also a Justice of the Peace.

In 1965, Cambridge University press published his book, By the Lake, about Kenyan culture.

== Personal life and death ==
In 1967, he married Daphne Anne Hortin. They had two children, a son and a daughter. Barnett died in Greenwich from a heart attack on Christmas Eve 1986, aged 58.

Parliament of the United Kingdom
Preceded by Victor Montagu	Member of Parliament for South Dorset; 1962–1964	Succeeded by Evelyn King
Preceded by Richard Marsh	Member of Parliament for Greenwich; 1971–1986	Succeeded by Rosie Barnes
