= List of constituents of British Railways =

The following is a list of constituents of British Railways. British Railways (BR) was formed by nationalisation on 1 January 1948 in accordance with the Transport Act 1947. It had four major constituents, but there were a number of joint lines between these, and additionally some light railways were taken into the fold. Even then, some light railways were not nationalised.

== Major constituents ==
The major constituents (the "Big Four") were:

- Great Western Railway (GWR)
- London Midland and Scottish Railway (LMS)
- London and North Eastern Railway (LNER)
- Southern Railway (SR)

== Joint railways ==
Joint railways between the four major constituents (and others) were:

- Axholme Joint Railway Committee (1/2 LMS, 1/2 LNER)
- Cheshire Lines Committee (2/3 LNER, 1/3 LMS)
- Dumbarton and Balloch Joint Railway (1/2 LMS, 1/2 LNER)
- Dundee and Arbroath Joint Railway (1/2 LMS, 1/2 LNER)
- Forth Bridge Railway Company (2/3 LNER, 1/3 LMS)
- Grangemouth Branch Railway (LMS, LNER)
- Great Central and Midland Joint Committee (1/2 LMS, 1/2 LNER)
- Great Central and North Staffordshire Joint Committee (1/2 LMS, 1/2 LNER)
- Great Central and North Western Railways Joint Committee (1/2 LMS, 1/2 LNER)
- Great Central, Hull and Barnsley and Midland Committee (2/3 LNER, 1/3 LMS)
- Great Northern and London and North Western Joint Committee (1/2 LMS, 1/2 LNER)
- Great Western and Great Central Railways Joint Committee (1/2 GWR, 1/2 LNER)
- Great Western and Great Central (Banbury Junction Railway) Joint Committee (1/2 GWR, 1/2 LNER)
- Halifax and Ovenden Joint Committee (LMS, LNER)
- Halifax High Level Joint Committee (LMS, LNER)
- London, Midland and Scottish and Great Western Railways Joint Committee (1/2 GWR, 1/2 LMS)
- Manchester South Junction and Altrincham Railway Company (1/2 LMS, 1/2 LNER)
- Midland and North Eastern Railway Companies Committee (1/2 LMS, 1/2 LNER)
- Mid-Nottinghamshire Joint Railway Committee (1/2 LMS, 1/2 LNER)
- Midland and Great Northern Joint Railway (1/2 LMS, 1/2 LNER)
- Norfolk and Suffolk Joint Railways Committee (1/2 LMS, 1/2 LNER)
- Oldham, Ashton-under-Lyne and Guide Bridge Junction Railway Company
- Otley and Ilkley Joint Line Committee (1/2 LMS, 1/2 LNER)
- Severn and Wye Joint Railway (1/2 LMS, 1/2 GWR)
- Somerset and Dorset Joint Railway (1/2 SR, 1/2 LMS)
- South Yorkshire Joint Line Committee (1/2 LMS, 1/2 LNER)

Joint railways between the four major constituents and others were:

- East London Railway Joint Committee (1/6 LNER, 1/2 SR, 1/3 London Transport)
- Metropolitan and Great Central Joint Committee (1/2 LNER, 1/2 London Transport)
- Watford Joint Railway Committee (1/2 LNER, 1/2 London Transport)

== Minor railways and light railways ==
- East Kent Light Railways Company
- Kent and East Sussex Light Railway Company
- Mersey Railway Company
- North Devon and Cornwall Junction Light Railway Company
- Shropshire and Montgomeryshire Light Railway Company
- King's Lynn Docks and Railway Company

== Irish railways ==
Irish railways owned by the LMS (the Northern Counties Committee and Dundalk, Newry and Greenore Railway lines) were also acquired but the NCC was quickly sold on to the Ulster Transport Authority, the transport unit of the Government of Northern Ireland as a result of the Ireland Act 1949. The Dundalk, Newry and Greenore Railway closed in 1951.
