= National Association of Railway Clubs =

The National Association of Railway Clubs is an autonomous association whose members are sports and social clubs in England, Scotland and Wales. It offers administration and support to its members. The Association was originally the British Railways Staff Association, becoming independent of British Railways and serving a broader community in 1990.

The Association is made of five regional organisations based on former British Rail regions:

- Federation of Railway Clubs Eastern
- London Midland Railway Clubs Association
- Railway Staff Association for Scotland
- National Association of Railway Clubs (Southern Region)
- Great Western Railway Staff Association
