= InterCity Sleeper (British Rail) =

Sleeper trains operated by British Rail

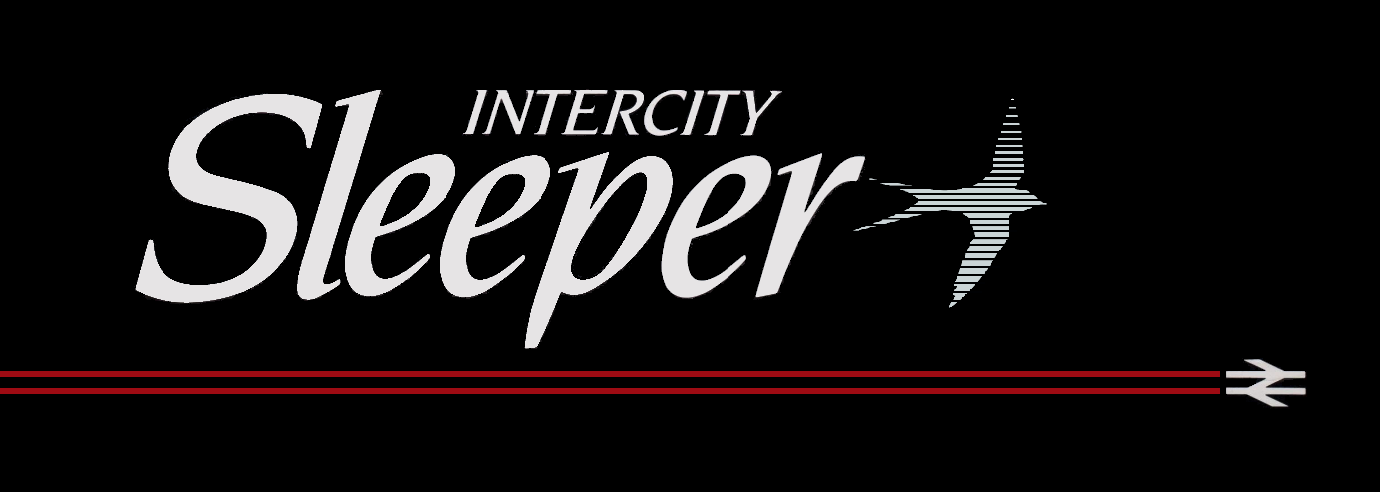

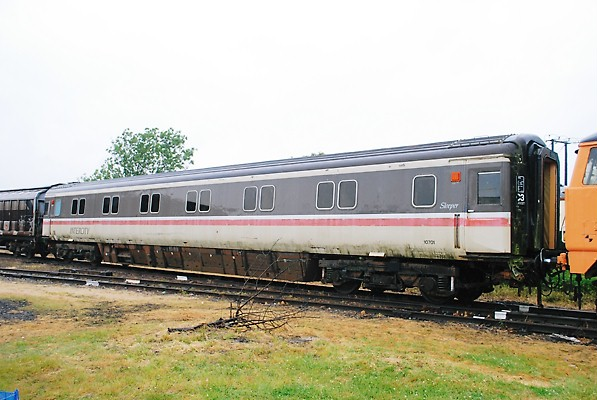
- BR Mark 3 InterCity sleeper coach

Overview
- Main Region: All
- Other Region: All
- Stations called at: 190
- Parent company: British Rail
- Dates of operation: 1966–1994
- Successors: First Great Western, Virgin CrossCountry, ScotRail

InterCity Sleeper was the collective name for overnight sleeper train services run by British Rail between London and Scotland, Cornwall, Wales, and Northern England in Great Britain. Services were not provided in Northern Ireland.

== History ==
When the railways came into public ownership in 1948, British railways inherited a number of night train services from The Big Four. Sleeping car services were operated on the West, East coast routes and GWR mainlines to multiple destinations, that were, but not limited to London Paddington to Birkenhead Woodside, Manchester Piccadilly to Plymouth, Liverpool Lime Street to London Euston and Night Ferry sleeper from London Victoria to Brussels and Paris.

The first sleeping car train on the Great Western Railway was introduced at the end of 1877 from London Paddington to Plymouth. This had 7 ft (2,134 mm) broad gauge carriages with two dormitories, one with seven gentlemen's berths and the other with four ladies' berths. These were later replaced in 1881 by new carriages with six individual compartments. An additional service was soon added from London to Penzance which eventually became known as the Night Riviera. Under BR sleeping cars were limited to just the Penzance service After nationalisation there were two major investments in the sleeper fleet. The first occurred between 1957 and 1964 when 380 Mark 1 sleeping car carriages were built to replace the fleets inherited from the GWR, LMS and LNER. The Southern Railway didn't operate sleeper trains but did provide access to Compagnie International des Wagon Lits (CIWL) for their Night Ferry service from London to Paris via the Dover to Dunkerque train ferry. BR introduced the Inter-City brand for long haul passenger services in 1966. This in turn put all sleepers under the Inter-city banner.

In the early 1960s the list of sleeper trains operated by BR was still extensive, despite some minor changes and early withdrawal of services including the end of the Friday night sleeper service from London to Oban at 19:15, from London Euston, services to Birkenhead, Manchester to Plymouth from London. However, sleeper services declined in number during the latter half of the 20th century, with the closure of truck routes, and some larger terminus stations, these had disappeared by 1975. In 1971, British Rail had already withdrawn the name Aberdonian from the early evening departure from King's Cross, then timed at 7:55 pm. The name Night Aberdonian was then used on the 10.15 King's Cross to Aberdeen sleeper service.

In 1977 operation of the Night Ferry sleeper train was taken over from CIWL by British Rail (Southern Region) under an agreement between BR, SNCF and SNCB. SNCF continued to be commercially responsible for the train as it had been since 1971 and bought the Wagon-Lits cars from CIWL. In January 1974 SNCF took over publicity of the Night Ferry sleeper service from CIWL. This ceased on the 31 October 1980 with the final departure of the Night Ferry sleeper from London, Paris and Brussels.

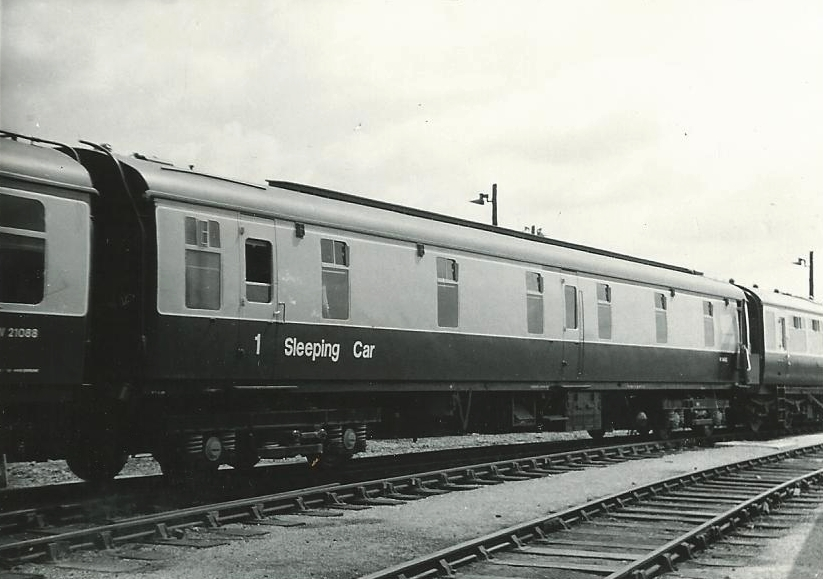
BR Mk.I SLC No.W2452 (with B5 bogies) in BR Inter City blue & grey livery, built as Diagram 5, Lot 30736, by BR Wolverton in 1964 - one of the very last Mk.I sleepers built; at Old Oak Common shed Open Day, 07/67.

On 11 July 1983 the Penzance sleeper was relaunched as the Night Riviera, designed to complement the long-established daytime Cornish Riviera. The seating carriages that formed part of the train were mainly Mark 2 carriages. The train by now was again leaving London at midnight, shown in the timetables as 23:59.

Services where further cutback, when in November 1987, it was announced that the last of the sleeper services running on the East Coast routes was to be withdrawn by May 1988. At one point, InterCity was planning to remove all seating accommodation on its remaining sleeper services from May 1992. However, it instead concluded a deal with the British transport conglomerate Stagecoach that saw the Mark 2 seating carriages retailed beyond this point. This was only a temporary reprieve however, as the Stagecoach carriages were withdrawn after 12 months. On Privatisation saw the services broken up in February 1996 and the rolling stock was repainted into the new liveries.

== Routes ==
By 1975 the BR sleeper train services included the following:

- London Kings Cross to Leeds
- London Kings Cross to Newcastle
- London Kings Cross to Edinburgh, Fort William and Aberdeen.
- London Euston to Liverpool Lime Street
- London Euston to Manchester Piccadilly
- London Euston to Holyhead
- London Euston to Preston and Barrow
- London Euston to Carlisle and Stranraer Harbour
- London Euston to Glasgow and Inverness
- London Paddington to Milford Haven
- London Paddington to Exeter, Plymouth and Penzance
- London Victoria to Paris and Brussels (The Night Ferry)
- Bristol Temple Meads to Glasgow Central and Edinburgh
- Nottingham to Glasgow

By 1986 this had been cut to the following:

- London Kings Cross to Aberdeen (2 Trains)
- London Kings Cross to Edinburgh
- London Kings Cross to Newcastle
- London Euston to Inverness (2 Trains) and Fort William
- London Euston to Stranraer
- London Euston to Glasgow Central and Perth
- London Euston to Carlisle and Glasgow Central
- London Euston to Manchester and Liverpool
- Preston to London Euston (Southbound Only)
- London Paddington to Penzance
- Bristol to Glasgow Central and Edinburgh
- Glasgow Queen Street and Edinburgh to Inverness
- Glasgow Queen Street to Aberdeen (Northbound Only)

By 1991 this had been further reduced to the following:

- London Euston to Fort William
- London Euston to Inverness
- London Euston to Aberdeen
- London Euston to Edinburgh
- London Euston to Glasgow Central
- London Euston to Carlisle
- London Paddington to Penzance
- Poole to Glasgow and Edinburgh
- Plymouth to Glasgow and Edinburgh

== Rolling stock ==
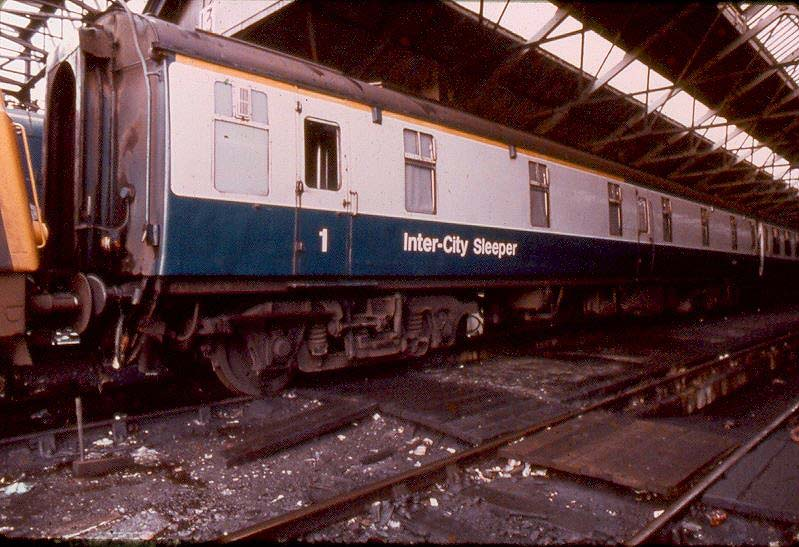
BR Mk.I painted in British rail blue

British Railways and outside contractors built the British Railways Mark 1 sleeping car between 1957 and 1964. Three hundred and eighty cars of three different types were built, with a fourth type created later by conversion. None remain in front-line service and very few are preserved (this was due to asbestos insulation in most carriages). Three types were designed, based on the BR Mark 1 63-foot (19.20 m) underframe and profile. All featured 11 compartments with side corridor, an attendants' pantry at one end, and two toilets at the other. There was one fixed berth in first class compartments and two fixed berths in second class. Thus the Sleeper First (SLF) slept 11 and the Sleeper Second (SLSTP) 22. The Sleeper Composite (SLC) had five first class and 6 second class compartments.

Early examples were fitted with BR1 bogies which were later replaced with B5 bogies. Later examples were fitted with Commonwealth bogies from new. The cars weighed 39 to 42 tonnes, with the First-class cars weighing one tonne less than the others, and cars with the fabricated B5 bogies also weighing one tonne less than those with the heavy cast steel Commonwealth bogies.

By 1978, the Mark 1 sleeping car, seen in late 1950s, as an improvement compared to vehicles built during the grouping era were seen as less than luxurious and revenue generated by sleeper trains decline. As a result, the second major build of new sleeping cars under British Rail came about in the early 1980s when 208 New Mark 3 air-conditioned sleeping cars vehicles were built at Derby. These included the Nightcap Bar carriage, which also appeared on Pullman services. These new cars introduced many safety features that had been lacking in the Mark 1 sleeping car.

=== Modifications ===
In order to overcome the lack of flexibility in the fleet of sleeping cars, Wolverton works modified some of the SLSTP cars with a stowable top berth. The resulting Sleeper Either class with Pantry (SLEP) cars could then be used to better accommodate the fluctuations in passenger demand. The SLEPs were renumbered in the 2800-series.

=== Replacement ===
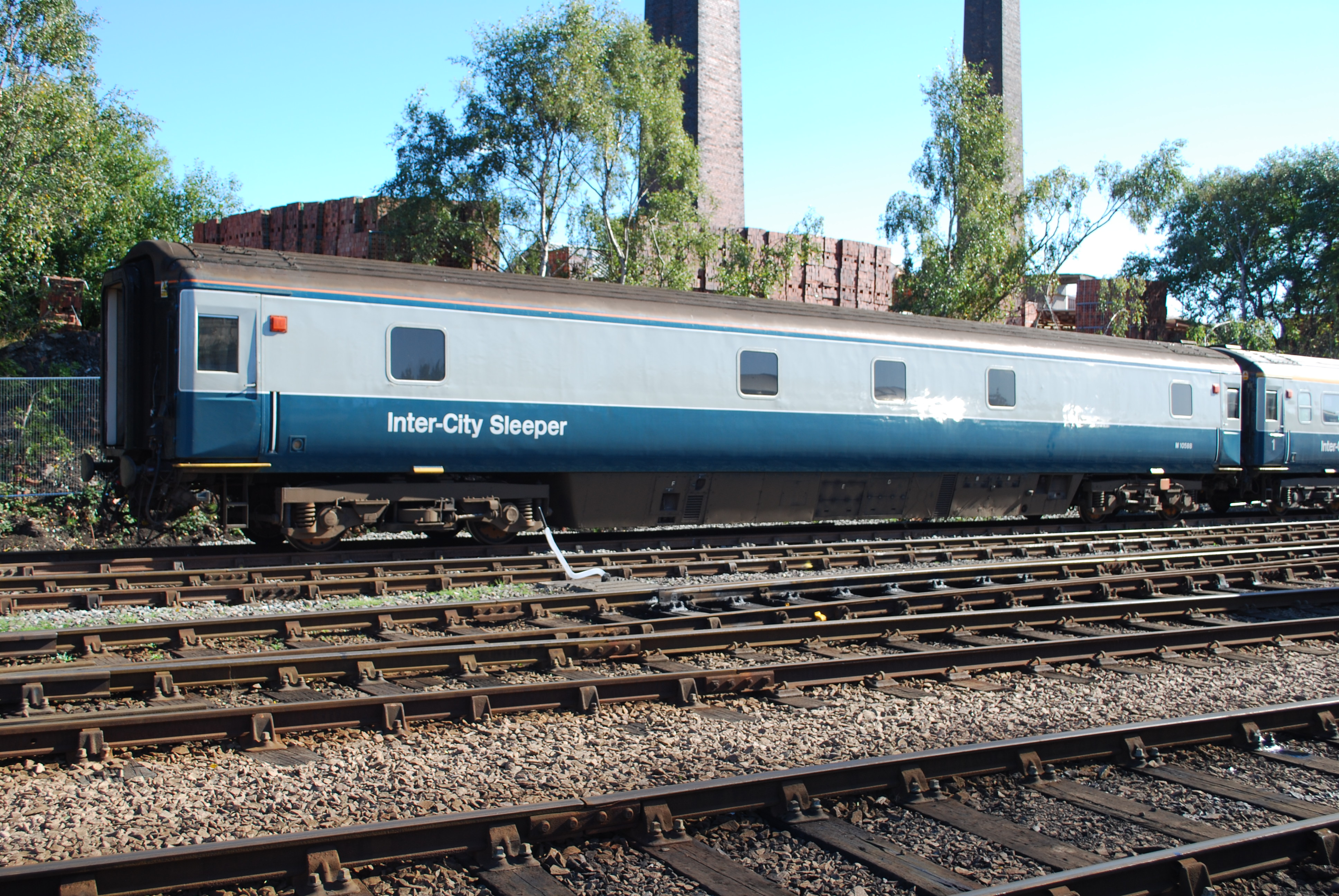
BR Mk.IIIa SLEP No.10588 of Cargo-D in BR Inter City blue & grey livery. Built by BREL (Derby) 1986. At Barrow Hill, 09/10

The Mark 1 sleeping cars fleet continued to serve British Rail for many years. With no Mark 2 sleeping car design, the Mark 1s continued until the British Rail Mark 3 sleeping cars entered service in the early 1980s.

== Incidents ==
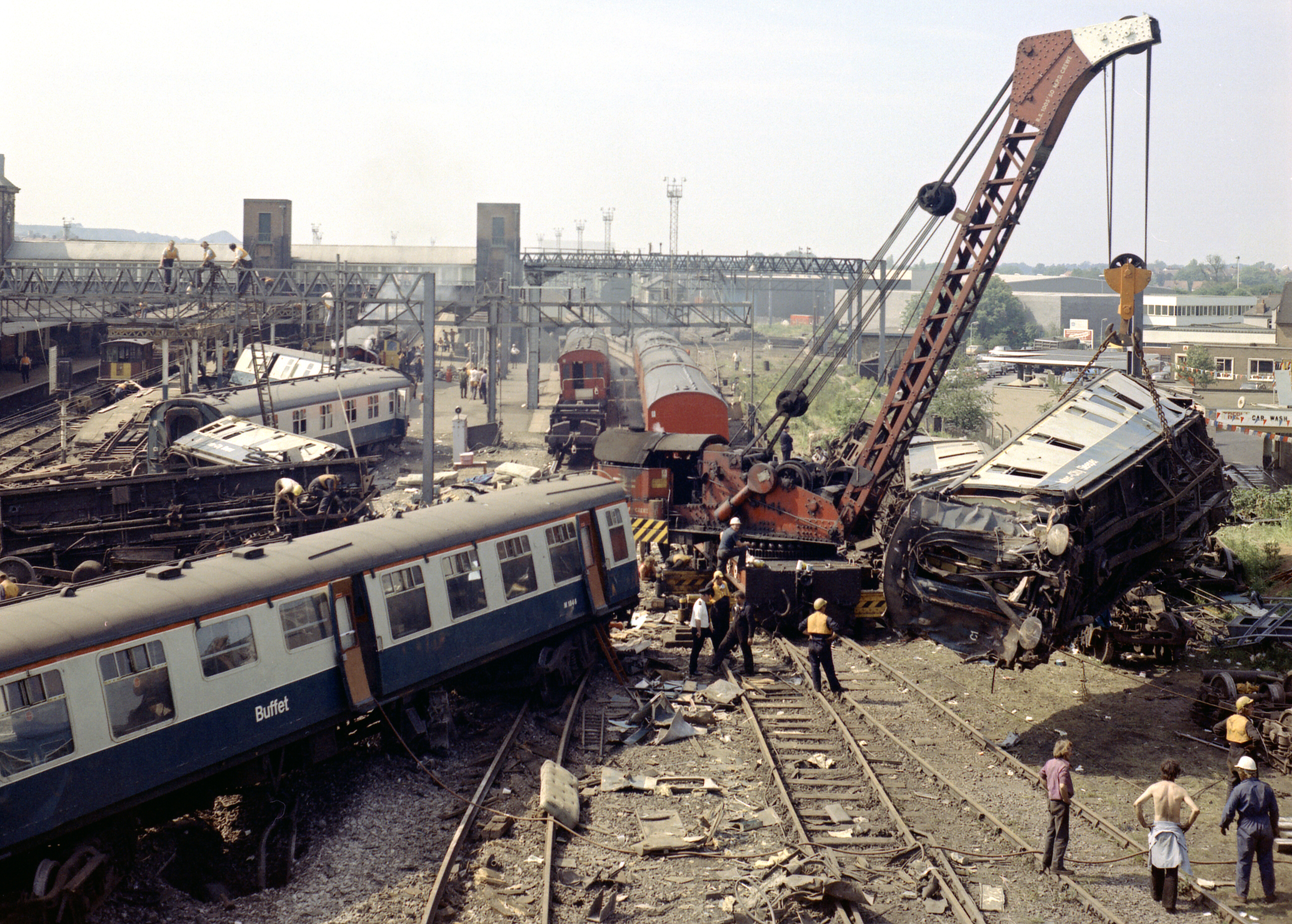
Clear up work following the Nuneaton Crash 1975

On 6 June 1975 the 23:30 sleeper from London Euston to Glasgow derailed after entering a temporary speed restriction at 4 times the speed limit. Six people (four passengers and two staff) died and 38 were injured. In the subsequent inquiry, the crash was deemed to have been caused by driver error, partially due to the failure of gas lit lamps that illuminated the lineside signage warning of the speed restriction.

On 5 July 1978, the up train left Penzance at 21:30 bound for London Paddington station but never reached London. Approaching Taunton early the following morning the emergency brake was activated and it came to a standstill, just short of the station with one of the carriages on fire. This had been caused by dirty linen that had been placed near a heater, which had been a standard and safe practice before the recent change from steam to electric heating. Twelve people died and thirteen were injured.

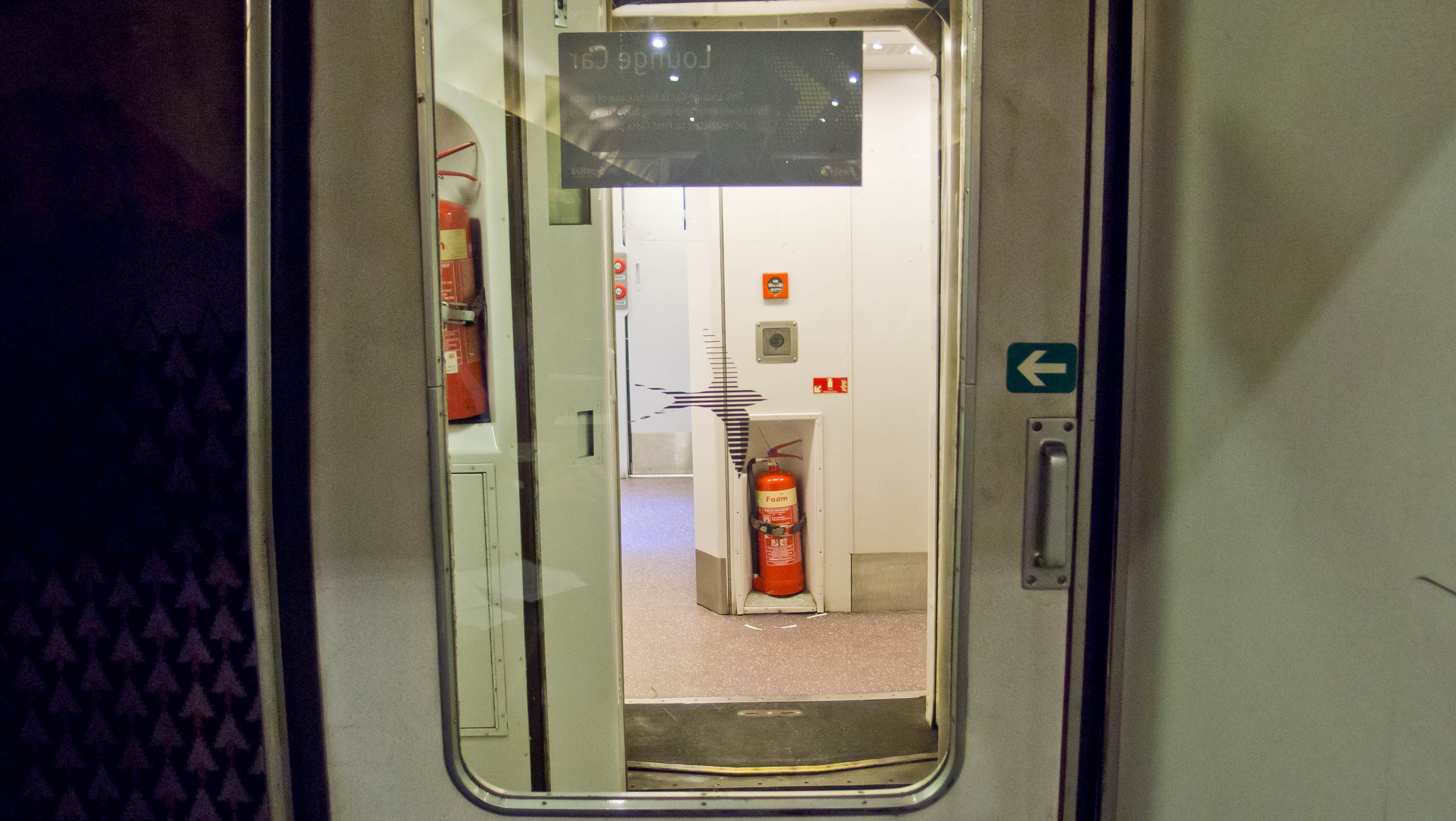
InterCity Sleeper 'Swallow' logo on a Caledonian Sleeper in 2012

== Popular culture ==
- Night Train to Murder TV film starring Morecambe & Wise, deliberately evoking the classic British night-train mystery, notable as the last work that Eric Morecambe and Ernie Wise worked on together before Morecambe's death in 1984.

== See also ==
- Inter-city rail in the United Kingdom
- Caledonian Sleeper – Overnight sleeper trains between London and Scotland
- Night Riviera – Overnight sleeper train between London and Cornwall
