= List of accidents on British Rail =

This is a list of rail accidents and incidents that involved British Railways, known from 1968 as British Rail, occurring in the period 1948–94. It does not cover accidents involving Northern Ireland Railways, or heritage railways.

== 1948 ==
- On 17 April 1948, a postal train was in a rear-end collision with a passenger train at Winsford, Cheshire due to a signalman's error. In the first major accident of the newly formed British Railways, 24 people died.
- On 17 May 1948, a freight train ran away and was in collision with an empty stock train at Battyeford, West Riding of Yorkshire.

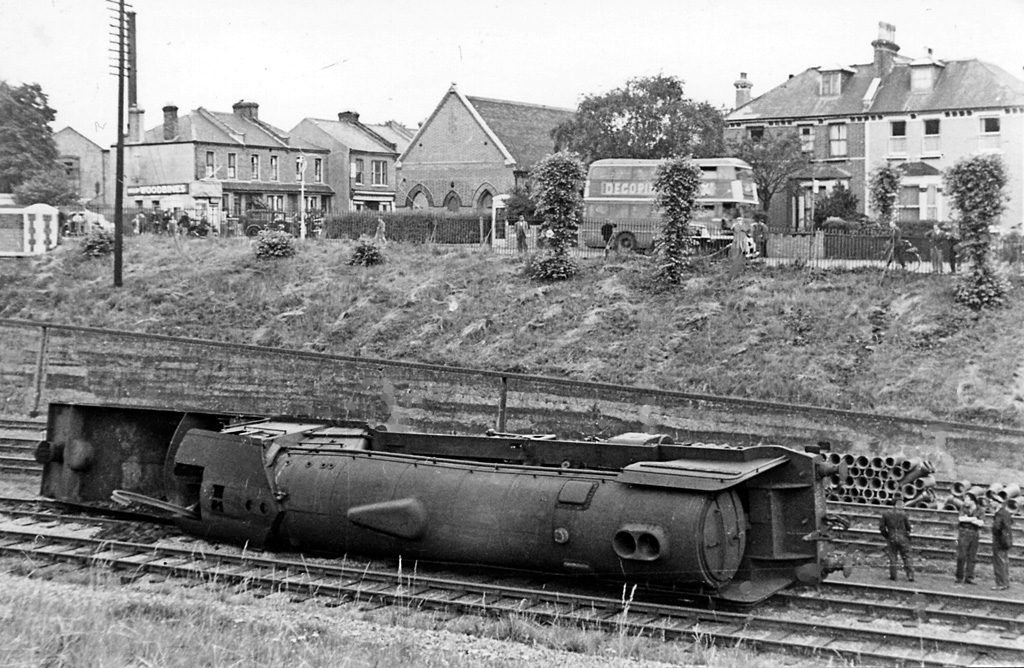
New Southgate.

- On 17 July 1948, a passenger train was derailed at New Southgate, London due to a combination of defective track and excessive speed. One person died.
- On 16 October 1948, former Mayor of Peterborough Arthur Holditch Mellows died when his car was struck by a train at Conington level crossing.
- On 18 November 1948, an electric multiple unit departed from Woolwich Dockyard station, London against signals. It subsequently collided with another electric multiple unit at Woolwich Arsenal station. Two people died.

== 1949 ==
- On 19 February 1949, a parcels train became divided at New Southgate. The rear portion ran back, obstructing the main line, from which the train had just been crossed onto the slow line. Due to a signalman's error, an express passenger train ran into the vans and was derailed.
- On 23 June 1949, a carriage of an express passenger train caught fire. The train was brought to a stand near Penmanshiel Tunnel, Berwickshire. Seven people were injured, but there were no fatalities.
- On 14 November 1949, a rake of carriages were left foul of an adjacent line at Bournemouth Central station, Hampshire. A locomotive struck them and was derailed. One person was injured.

== 1950 ==
- On 7 March 1950, An ex-LNER Thompson Class B1 was hauling an express passenger train at night near Witham Junction, when it collided with the rear of a mineral train in fog. The passenger fireman and goods guard died.
- On 5 June 1950, An express passenger train was derailed at Tollerton, Nottinghamshire due to heat buckled track.
- On 8 June 1950, a carriage of an express passenger train caught fire. The train was brought to a stand at Beattock, Dumfriesshire. Five people died and one was injured.
- On 27 August 1950, an express passenger train, the Irish Mail, was in a rear-end collision with a light engine at Penmaenmawr, Denbighshire due to a signalman's error. One person died. Prompt action by the fireman of the light engine prevented a freight train from running into the wreckage.
- On 23 October 1950, a passenger train was derailed at Drumburgh, Cumberland due to defective track. Two people died and three were injured.

== 1951 ==
- On 14 July 1951, two carriages of an express passenger train caught fire. The train was brought to a stand at Huntingdon, Huntingdonshire. 22 people were injured, but there were no fatalities.
- On 5 August 1951, an electric multiple unit overran signals and was in a rear-end collision with another at Ford, West Sussex. Nine people died and 47 were seriously injured.
- On 9 August 1951, an express passenger train was derailed at Doncaster, Yorkshire due to defective track. Fourteen people died and twelve were injured.
- On 17 August 1951, two electric multiple units were in a head-on collision at Newcastle Central station, Northumberland after one of them departed against a danger signal. Two people died.
- On 21 September 1951, an express passenger train was derailed at Weedon, Northamptonshire due to a defective bogie on the locomotive hauling it. Fifteen people died and 35 were injured.
- On 19 November 1951, a bridge was washed away between Cocking and Midhurst, West Sussex. A freight train was derailed when it attempted to cross the bridge. Recovery of the locomotive took more than three months.

== 1952 ==
- On 21 April 1952, an express passenger train was derailed at Blea Moor Loops, Cumberland due to a defect on one of the locomotives hauling it, causing points to move under the train.
- On 20 July 1952, a passenger train overran signals and was derailed by trap points at Shawford, Hampshire.

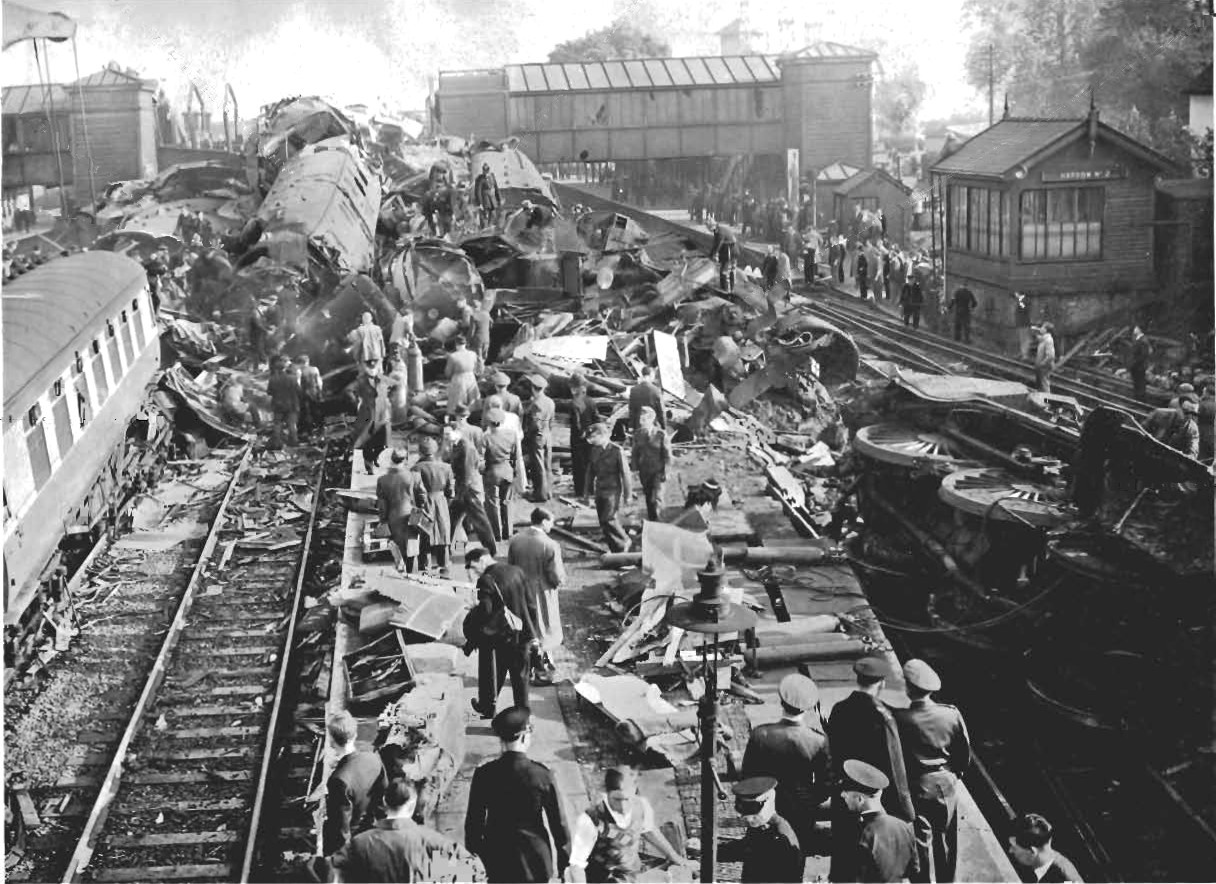
Harrow and Wealdstone.

- On 8 October 1952, an express passenger train overran signals and was in a rear-end collision with a local passenger train at Harrow and Wealdstone, Middlesex. An express passenger train travelling in the opposite direction then ran into the wreckage. In the deadliest accident for British Railways, 112 people died and 240 were injured.
- In 1952, a rake of wagons ran away and were derailed at Lockwood, Yorkshire.

== 1953 ==
- On 15 August 1953, an electric multiple unit overran signals and collided with a freight train at Irk Valley Junction, Collyhurst, Lancashire. The collision occurred on a viaduct; one carriage falling 40 feet (12 m) into the River Irk. Ten people died and 58 were injured.
- On 16 August 1953, a passenger train became divided and derailed at Kingsbury, Warwickshire due to a combination of defects on the locomotive and the condition of the track.
- On 4 September 1953, a passenger train was derailed at Bethnal Green, London when a set of points moved under it.

== 1954 ==
- On 3 February 1954, an express passenger train was derailed at Watford Junction station, Hertfordshire due to a broken rail. Nine people were injured.
- On 8 May 1954, an express freight train became divided and was derailed at Plumpton, Cumberland.
- On 23 September 1954, a freight train overran signals and was derailed by trap points at Whitchurch Town station, Hampshire.

== 1955 ==
- On 23 January 1955, an express passenger train was derailed at Sutton Coldfield, Warwickshire due to excessive speed on a curve. Seventeen people died and 25 were injured.
- On 28 May 1955, a train carrying 539 passengers including 301 children derailed due to excessive speed and driver error at Wormit station in Fife, near the Tay Bridge, three people died and 41 were injured.
- On 7 August 1955, an express passenger train was derailed at Barby, Northamptonshire due to excessive speed through a set of points. One person died and eighteen were injured. Errors by a pilotman during single line working and confusion over where the train was due to be diverted were major contributory factors.
- On 20 November 1955, an excursion train was derailed at Milton, Oxfordshire due to excessive speed through a crossover. Eleven people died and 157 were injured.
- On 2 December 1955, an electric multiple unit train ran into the rear of a freight train at Barnes station, London due to a signalman's error. A fire destroyed the first carriage of the leading electric multiple unit. Thirteen people died and 41 were injured.
- On 22 December 1955, an express passenger train overruns signals and was in a rear-end collision with another express passenger train at Hellifield station, Yorkshire. Irregular operation of signals was a major contributory factor. The signalman at Hellifield South Junction Signal Box was blamed for the accident.
- On 23 December 1955, a passenger train was in a rear-end collision with another at Woking, Surrey.

== 1956 ==
- On 17 August 1956, a rake of carriages ran away and collided with another rake of carriages at Bournemouth West, Hampshire.
- On 25 August 1956, an empty stock train ran away and crashed through the buffers at Filey Holiday Camp station, Yorkshire due to the failure to connect the brake pipe between the train and the locomotive hauling it.
- On 6 September 1956, a parcels train overran signals and was in a rear-end collision with an express passenger train at Ludlow, Shropshire.

== 1957 ==
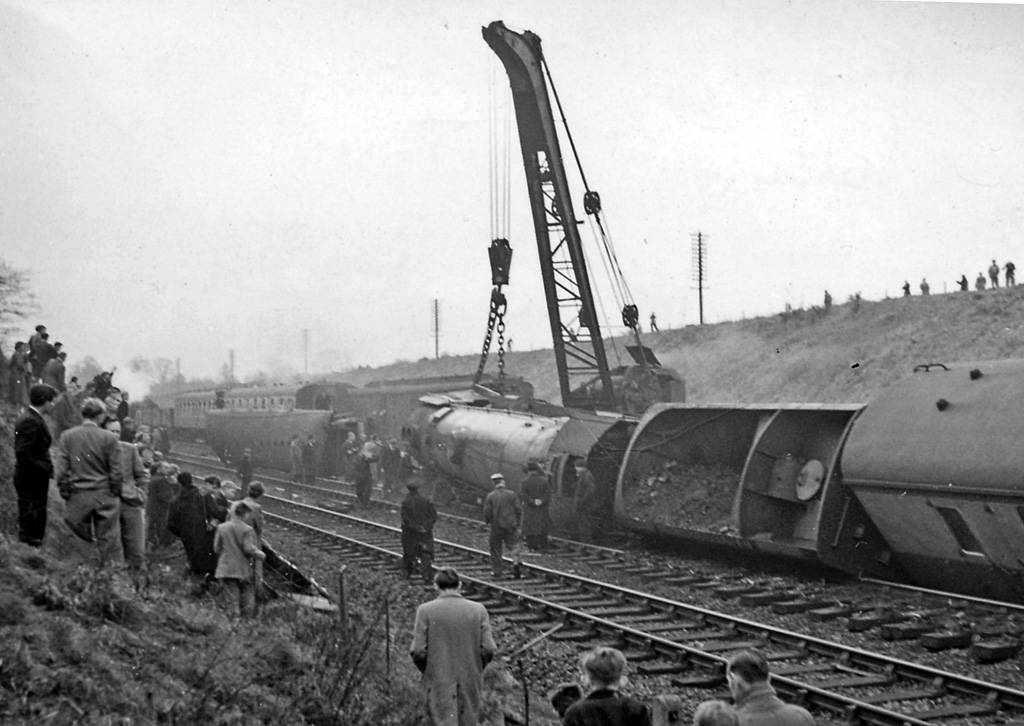
- Welwyn Garden City
  On 7 January 1957, an express passenger train overran signals and was in a rear-end collision with a passenger train at Welwyn Garden City, Hertfordshire. One person died and 25 were injured.
- On 9 February 1957, a freight train ran away due to a broken steam brake pipe in the cab of the locomotive hauling it. It collided with another freight train at Chapel-en-le-Frith station, Derbyshire. Station staff had enough warning to be able to evacuate a diesel multiple unit which was standing in the station before the collision. Driver John Axon, who had remained with the train, died. He was awarded a posthumous George Cross.
- On 9 August 1957, a train formed of two electric multiple units was in a head-on collision with a light engine at Staines, Middlesex after it departed against a danger signal. Nine people were injured.
- On 6 December 1957, an express passenger train overran signals and ran into the rear of an electric multiple unit at St Johns, London. A bridge collapsed onto the wreckage, crushing three carriages of the express. Ninety people died, 173 were injured.
- In December 1957, a freight train overran signals and was derailed at Woodhay, Hampshire.

== 1958 ==
- On 30 January 1958, a passenger train overran signals and was in a rear-end collision with another at Dagenham station, Essex. Ten people died and 89 were injured.
- On 16 February 1958, a passenger train is in a rear-end collision with a light engine at Ince Moss Junction, Lancashire due to errors by a signalman and the driver of the light engine. Two people died .
- On 4 April 1958, a parcels train overran signals and was in collision with an electric multiple unit at Gloucester Road Junction, Croydon, Surrey. Six people were injured.
- On 20 May 1958, a passenger train was in collision with a locomotive and brake van at Arkleston Junction, Paisley, Renfrewshire due to errors by the driver of the locomotive. One person died and 26 were hospitalised.
- On 28 June 1958, a rake of carriages ran away and were derailed at Lockwood, Yorkshire.
- On 4 July 1958, an empty stock train was in a head-on collision with an electric multiple unit at Maze Hill, London after the latter overran signals. Forty-five people were injured.
- On 5 August 1958, a passenger train crashed through the buffers at York.
- On 12 August 1958, an electric multiple unit train was derailed at Borough Market Junction, London due to defective track. Six people were injured.
- On 25 August 1958, a sleeping car train overran a signal and was in a head-on collision with a train formed of two electric multiple units at Eastbourne, East Sussex. Five people died and 40 were injured.
- On 2 September 1958, the rear van of passenger train was derailed at Lunan Bay, Angus, causing the train to come to a halt due to a loss of vacuum. The train crew failed to realise that their train was incomplete; the restored the vacuum and continued their journey, leaving a van obstructing the line. The signalman at Usan station failed to notice that the train was not displaying a tail lamp and gave "train out of section" to the signalman at Inverkeilor Signal Box. A passenger train consequently collided with the wreckage of the derailed van.
- On 19 November 1958, a freight train overran signals and was in a rear-end collision with another at Hitchin, Hertfordshire. A third freight train ran into the wreckage.
- On 22 November 1958, a passenger train was derailed at Balnaguard, Perthshire when a bridge was washed away in a storm. Two people were slightly injured.
- In 1958, a passenger train was derailed at Millbrook, Southampton when a faulty point motor moved a set of points under the train.

== 1959 ==
- On 17 February 1959, an electric multiple unit was in a rear-end collision with another at Crayford, Kent due to a signalman's error. Seventy people were injured.
- On 29 October 1959, a passenger train overran signals and was derailed by trap points at St Denys, Hampshire.
- On 4 November 1959, a freight train skidded and came to rest foul of the line at West Sleekburn, Northumberland where another freight train was in a head-on collision with it. Two people died.
- On 9 November 1959, a freight train ran away and collided with an empty stock train at Finsbury Park, London.
- On 12 November 1959, a passenger train overran signals and was in a rear-end collision with another at East Ham. London. Thirteen people were injured.
- On 15 December 1959, a passenger train was in collision with a rake of vans at London Victoria station. Eleven people were injured.

== 1960 ==
- On 9 January 1960, a freight train was derailed at Kentish Town, London.
- On 19 February 1960, a freight train was derailed at Consett, County Durham.
- On 12 December 1960, a passenger train overran signals and was derailed at St Denys, Hampshire. Two people were injured.

== 1961 ==
- On 11 February 1961, an express freight train became divided between Rugby Central station, Warwickshire and Lutterworth, Leicestershire. The rear portion was derailed. An express passenger train ran into the wreckage from the rear. One person died and four were injured.
- On 13 February 1961, an express passenger train was in collision with a freight train that was being shunted at Baschurch, Shropshire due to a signalman's error. Three people died and two were injured.
- In February 1961, a diesel multiple unit ran away and crashed through the buffers at Royton, Lancashire. The leading carriage crashed into a terraced house and caught fire, seriously injuring the driver.
- On 20 March 1961, a diesel-electric multiple unit and an electric multiple unit were in a side-long collision at Cannon Street, London after the latter overran signals.
- On 11 April 1961, an electric multiple unit overran signals and was in collision with a light engine at Waterloo station, London. One person died and fourteen were injured.
- On 18 April 1961, a passenger train was derailed at Pitsea, Essex due to a pointsman's error during single line working. There were two fatalities.
- On 6 June 1961, a light engine was in collision with a freight train at Carlisle Citadel, Cumberland.
- On 16 July 1961, a train formed of two diesel multiple units was in collision with a rake of wagons near Weeton, Lancashire due to a signalman's error and was derailed. Seven people died and 116 were injured.
- On 23 September 1961, a passenger train collided with a Land Rover at the Swavesey level crossing on the Cambridge to St. Ives line. The vehicle had been wrongly admitted to the crossing by the crossing keeper. Three men and a young boy were killed.
- On 16 October 1961, a freight train ran away approaching Robin Hoods Bay station, Yorkshire. As there was a train approaching from the opposite direction, the signalman diverted it into a siding, where it crashed through the buffers.
- On 7 December 1961, a light engine collided with a freight train at Bodmin General station, Cornwall due to a signal not giving a clear danger signal.
- On 15 December 1961, an empty stock train was in a rear-end collision with a freight train at Conington, Huntingdonshire during permissive block working. A freight train then ran into the wreckage, followed a few minutes later by a third freight train.

== 1962 ==
- On 7 January 1962, a freight train was derailed at Mirfield, Yorkshire.
- On 2 February 1962, a passenger train was in a rear-end collision with a freight train at Polmont, Stirlingshire due to a signalman's error. Five people were injured.
- On 4 June 1962, an express passenger train was derailed at Lincoln Central station, Lincolnshire due to excessive speed on a curve. Three people died and 49 were injured.
- On 10 June 1962, a southbound freight train was derailed at speed by the loop points at Blea Moor, [North Yorkshire]. The guard was injured.
- On 1 August 1962, an electric multiple unit was derailed at Barnham, West Sussex when points moved under the train due to an electrical fault. Thirty-eight people were injured.
- On 25 August 1962, a passenger train came to a halt at Torquay, Devon due to a defect on the locomotive hauling it. Another passenger train overran a signal and ran into its rear. Twenty-three people were injured.

== 1963 ==
- On 1 April 1963, a freight train was derailed near Weedon, Northamptonshire due to a defective wagon, fouling an adjacent line. An express passenger train collided with the derailed wagons.
- On 23 March 1963, a freight train was derailed between Burghclere and Highclere stations, Hampshire.
- On 1 August 1963, an express passenger train overran signals and collided with a passenger train at Norton Bridge, Staffordshire.
- On 1 August 1963, a passenger train formed of electric multiple units was derailed at Barnham station, West Sussex when an electrical fault caused a set of points to operate as the train approached them.
- On 15 August 1963, an express passenger train was in collision with a freight train at Knowle & Dorridge station, Warwickshire due to a signalman's error. Three people died.

== 1964 ==
- On 5 March 1964, a freight train overran signals and collided with another freight train at Itchingfield Junction, Sussex. Two people died.
- On 7 April 1964, a freight train was derailed near Howe & Co's Signalbox, Cumberland due to a combination of a defective wagon, excessive speed and minor track defects.
- On 28 May 1964, a passenger train carrying more than 230 schoolchildren derailed and crashed at Cheadle Hulme, Cheshire. The primary causes were driver error and excessive speed. Three people died and 27 were injured.
- On 23 October 1964, an electric multiple unit was derailed near Brighton, East Sussex and was severely damaged. It was placed in the Lover's Walk Sidings for cutting up. On 25 October, steam crane DS1196 overturned whilst moving one of the motor bogies of the electric multiple unit. It was scrapped in situ.

== 1965 ==
- On 7 May 1965, a freight train was derailed at Preston-le-Skerne, County Durham. A newspaper train collided with the derailed wagons and was itself derailed.

== 1966 ==
- On 15 July 1966, an express passenger train was derailed at Kingham, Oxfordshire due to an unsecured switch blade on a set of points. Eighteen people were injured.
- On 14 August 1966, an express passenger train ran into a landslip and was derailed at Sanquhar, Dumfriesshire and was derailed.
- On 30 September 1966, a freight train overran signals and was derailed by trap points at Wallers Ash, Hampshire.

== 1967 ==
- On 31 July 1967, a freight train was derailed at Thirsk, Yorkshire with some of the wagons coming to rest foul of an adjacent line. An express passenger train collided with them. Seven people died and 45 were injured.
- On 28 November 1967, a newspaper train was derailed at Raynes Park, London, severely damaging a footbridge when one of the vans collided with its supporting pillars.

== 1968 ==
- On 6 January 1968, an express passenger train was in collision with an abnormal load on a level crossing at Hixon, Staffordshire. Eleven people died and 45 were injured.
- On 1 September 1968, a freight train was derailed at Aldwyth, Dumfriesshire.

== 1969 ==
- On 7 May 1969, an express passenger train was derailed at Morpeth, Northumberland due to excessive speed on a curve. Six people died and 46 were injured.
- On 10 June 1969, a freight train was derailed at Lichfield, Staffordshire due to heat-buckled track.
- On 13 June 1969, an express passenger train was derailed at Somerton, Somerset due to heat-buckled track.
- On 15 June 1969, a freight train was derailed at Lamington, Scotland due to heat-buckled track.
- On 23 July 1969, An express passenger train was derailed at Sandy, Bedfordshire due to heat-buckled track.

== 1971 ==
- On 26 July 1971, an electric multiple unit departed from Macclesfield station against signals and was derailed by trap points.
- On 28 July 1971, a parcels train was derailed at Guildford station, Surrey.

== 1973 ==
- In June 1973, a freight train was derailed at Ashwood Dale, Derbyshire due to a combination of excessive speed and defective track. The line was closed for several weeks.
- On 19 December 1973, an express passenger train was derailed at Ealing Broadway station, London when a loose door struck point rodding, causing a set of points to move under the train. Ten people died and 94 were injured.
- In 1973, a freight train was derailed inside Disley Tunnel, Cheshire due to a broken rail. Recovery of the wagons took about a week.
- In 1973, an electric multiple unit overran signals and was in a rear-end collision with a diesel multiple unit at Shields Junction, Lanarkshire.

== 1975 ==
- Nuneaton.
  On 6 June 1975, an express passenger train was derailed at Nuneaton, Warwickshire due to excessive speed during permanent way works. Six people died and 38 were injured.
- On 6 August 1975, two freight trains collided at Weaver Junction. Some tanks and vehicles derailed but not the locomotives. Inadequate vacuum brakes on some wagons was cited as the main cause.
- In September 1975, Class 33 locomotive 33 041 was involved in an accident in London and was consequently written off.
- On 6 August 1975, a freight train was unable to stop due to a lack of brake power. It collided with another freight train at Weaver Junction, Cheshire.
- On 26 October 1975, an express passenger train failed at Lunan, Angus. A locomotive was sent to its assistance, but crashed into the rear of the train. One person died and 42 were injured.

== 1976 ==
- On 2 January 1976, a light engine was in a rear-end collision with a parcels train at Worcester Tunnel Junction during time interval working. Both crew members died.
- On 25 June 1976, a diesel multiple unit passenger train overran signals and collided with another diesel multiple unit at Luton, Bedfordshire. An express passenger train then collided with the wreckage, striking it with a glancing blow.

== 1977 ==
- On 5 September 1977, a mail train was in a head-on collision with a diesel multiple unit at Farnley Junction, Leeds, West Yorkshire due to a signalling fault. Two people died and fifteen were injured.
- On 11 October 1977, a freight train was derailed at Mottingham, London.

== 1978 ==
- On 6 July 1978, a fire developed on a sleeping car train, which came to a halt at Silk Mill Crossing, Taunton, Somerset. Twelve people died and fifteen were injured.
- In September 1978, a freight train ran away and was derailed by trap points at Chinley, Derbyshire.

== 1979 ==
- On 1 March 1979, a rake of wagons ran away and was derailed by trap points at Peak Forest, Derbyshire.
- On 29 November 1979, a High Speed Train was derailed at Northallerton, North Yorkshire.
- In 1979, a freight train was derailed inside New Mills Tunnel, Derbyshire when the track spread under the train due to defective track maintenance procedures.

== 1980 ==
- On 16 February 1980, an express passenger train was derailed at Bushey, Hertfordshire due to a broken rail. Nineteen people were seriously injured.
- On 22 May 1980, a sleeper train was derailed at Prestonpans, Lothian due to vandalism.

== 1981 ==
- On 8 April 1981, a freight train was derailed at Hadfield, Derbyshire.
- On 11 December 1981, a diesel multiple unit passenger train was in a rear end collision with a stationary empty stock train near Seer Green, Buckinghamshire. Four people died and five were seriously injured. A combination of severe blizzards and human error was attributed to the crash.

== 1982 ==
- On 16 January 1982, a freight train was derailed at Chinley, Derbyshire.

== 1984 ==
- On 23 June 1984, a passenger train was derailed at Morpeth, Northumberland due to excessive speed on a curve. Fifteen people were injured.
- On 13 November 1984, a freight train was derailed at Stockport, Cheshire due to a defective wagon.
- On 30 November 1984, a passenger train was derailed at Stoulton, Worcestershire due to defective track. Two people were injured.

== 1986 ==
- On 9 March 1986, a passenger train was in collision with two light engines at Chinley, Derbyshire due to a signalman's error. One person died. Lack of training and a power cut were contributory factors.
- On 19 September 1986, an express passenger train overran signals and came to rest foul of a junction at Colwich, Staffordshire. Another express passenger train collided with it. One person died and 75 were injured. 32 people were hospitalised.

== 1987 ==
- On 20 February 1987, a freight train ran away and was derailed by trap points at Chinley, Derbyshire. Another train was in collision with the wreckage.
- On 24 March 1987, a freight train overran a signal and was in a head-on collision with a passenger train at Frome North Junction, Somerset. Several people were seriously injured.
- On 6 August 1987, a freight train ran away and was derailed by trap points at Baddesley Ensor, Warwickshire.
- On 19 October 1987, a bridge over the River Towy at Llandeilo, Carmarthenshire collapsed as a passenger train was crossing. Four people died.

== 1988 ==
- In January 1988, a freight train was sent into a siding and derailed at Tavistock Junction, Devon due to a pointsman's error.
- On 14 June 1988, a freight train overran signals and was derailed by trap points at Copyhold Junction, West Sussex. The locomotive was dismantled in stages in August and October before being taken to Doncaster Works and rebuilt.
- On 12 December 1988, an electric multiple unit passenger train was in a rear-end collision with another at Clapham Junction, London due to a signalling fault caused by a maintenance error. An empty stock train collided with the wreckage. Thirty-nine people died, 484 were injured.

== 1989 ==
- On 4 March 1989, an electric multiple unit overran signals and collided with another at Purley, Surrey. Five people died and 88 were injured.
- On 6 March 1989, an electric multiple unit departed from Bellgrove station, Glasgow and was in a head-on collision with another passenger train. Two people died.
- On 5 August 1989, an express passenger train derailed at West Ealing, London due to a piece of rail being left on the line.
- On 4 October 1989, two diesel multiple units were in collision at Huddersfield, West Yorkshire. Eighteen people were injured.

== 1990 ==
- On 22 August 1990, a diesel multiple unit overran signals and was in a head-on collision with another diesel multiple unit at Hyde Junction, Cheshire Twenty-eight people were injured.

== 1991 ==
- On 8 January 1991, a train formed of two electric multiple units collided with the buffers at Cannon Street station, London. Two people died and 534 were injured.
- On 16 May 1991, a tank wagon train was derailed and caught fire at Bradford-on-Tone, Somerset.
- On 21 July 1991, an electric multiple unit was in a head-on collision with another at Newton station, Strathclyde. Four people died and 22 were injured.
- On 2 November 1991, a sandite train caught fire inside Standedge Tunnel, Lancashire.
- On 7 December 1991, a diesel multiple unit was in a rear-end collision with a High Speed Train inside the Severn Tunnel. One hundred and eighty-five people were injured.
