= Richard Marsh, Baron Marsh =

British politician (1928–2011)

The Right Honourable The Lord Marsh PC
- Marsh in 1965

Member of the House of Lords
- Lord Temporal
- Life peerage 15 July 1981 – 29 July 2011

Minister of Transport
- In office 6 April 1968 – 6 October 1969
- Prime Minister: Harold Wilson
- Preceded by: Barbara Castle
- Succeeded by: Fred Mulley

Member of Parliament for Greenwich
- In office 8 October 1959 – 17 June 1971
- Preceded by: Joseph Reeves
- Succeeded by: Guy Barnett

Personal details
- Born: Richard William Marsh; 14 March 1928 London, England
- Died: 29 July 2011 (aged 83) London, England
- Party: Crossbencher
- Other political affiliations: Labour (before 1978)
- Education: Ruskin College
- Profession: Businessman

Richard William Marsh, Baron Marsh, PC (14 March 1928 – 29 July 2011) was a British politician and business executive.

== Background and early life ==
Marsh was the son of William Marsh, a foundry worker from Belvedere in southeast London. His father subsequently worked for the Great Western Railway, and the family moved to Swindon. He was educated at Jennings Street Secondary School, Swindon, Woolwich Polytechnic and Ruskin College, Oxford. He initially worked as an official for the National Union of Public Employees from 1951 to 1959, during which time he sat on the Clerical and Administrative Whitley Council for the National Health Service.

== Parliamentary and ministerial career ==
After unsuccessfully standing at Hertford in 1951, Marsh was elected as Labour Party Member of Parliament (MP) for Greenwich at the 1959 general election.

As a backbencher he submitted a private member's bill in 1960 which despite Government opposition became the Offices, Shops and Railway Premises Act 1963, a white-collar equivalent of the Factories Act and the forerunner of the Health and Safety at Work etc. Act 1974.

When Labour came to power in 1964 he became a Parliamentary Secretary in the Ministry of Labour and subsequently, in 1965, in the new Ministry of Technology.

=== Minister of Power ===
He served in the second Wilson Government as the Minister of Power (1966–68). On 22 April 1966 he officially opened the new Hinkley Point A nuclear power station. He piloted the legislation for the nationalisation of the steel industry.

=== Minister of Transport ===
Subsequently, he served in the Cabinet as Minister of Transport (1968–69). When appointed to the transport ministry he let it be known that (unlike Barbara Castle, his predecessor in the post) he was a motorist, though he insisted that the family car, a Ford Cortina, was run by his wife while he relied on ministerial cars for his transport needs. He was also reported as having taught his father to drive, but having given up trying to perform the same favour for his wife, applying what forty years later appears as imprudent candour in characterising the attempt as "traumatic". In March 1969, he announced that the Government planned to switch road speed limits to kilometres per hour in 1973. However, all plans for road signs to go metric were subsequently postponed by the following Conservative Government, with "no alternative date in mind".

== Chairman of British Rail ==
He left the House of Commons in 1971 to become Chairman of the British Railways Board, a position he held until 1976. On leaving British Rail, he was knighted, and became chairman of the Newspaper Publishers' Association (NPA). The first chairman of the NPA to come from outside of the industry, he served until 1990. He also held the chairmanships of the British Iron and Steel Consumers' Council from 1977 to 1982 and of Allied Investments Ltd from 1977 to 1981. He was also a member of a number of quangoes, held directorships in several private companies and was chairman of TV-am from 1983 to 1984.

== Supports Conservatives ==
In 1978 he announced that he had become a supporter of Margaret Thatcher, who had been his shadow counterpart when he was Minister of Transport, and intended to vote Conservative at the forthcoming general election, held in 1979. He was one of a group of ex-Labour politicians who defected to support the Conservatives in the 1979 election.

=== Peerage ===
Thatcher won the election, and she created him a life peer in the 1981 Birthday Honours with the letters patent issued giving his style and title as Baron Marsh, of Mannington in the County of Wiltshire on 15 July 1981. He then sat in the House of Lords as a crossbench peer.

== Personal ==
In 1950 Marsh married Evelyn Mary Andrews, with whom he had two sons. In 1973 they divorced.

In 1975 Marsh's second wife Caroline died in a road accident in Spain in which the wife of broadcaster David Jacobs also lost her life; Marsh and Jacobs both survived the crash.

He died in 2011 in London aged 83.

Coat of arms of Richard Marsh, Baron Marsh
Crest Upon a mount Vert a bear sejant upon its haunches and erect Or holding between its forepaws a mitra peciosa Gold panelled Vert garnished and lined Gules the infulae Vert and fringed at their ends Gold. Escutcheon Argent four pallets wavy Azure on a chevron over all Gules a leopard's face between two keys wards upwards and outwards Or on a chief Gules a double warded key wards upwards between two leopard's faces Gold. Supporters On either side a Japanese crane (Grus japonensis) Proper the interior wing and leg of each supporting the shield the whole upon a compartment composed of water barry wavy of four Azure and Argent between two banks of marshy ground Proper sprouting therefrom plants of marsh buckler fern marsh mallow and bulrush all slipped and leaved Proper. Motto Non Est Vivere Sed Valere Vita

Parliament of the United Kingdom
Preceded by Joseph Reeves	Member of Parliament for Greenwich; 1959–1971	Succeeded by Guy Barnett
Political offices
Preceded by Fred Lee	Minister of Power; 1966–1968	Succeeded by Ray Gunter
Preceded by Barbara Castle	Minister of Transport; 1968–1969	Succeeded by Fred Mulley
Business positions
Preceded by Sir Henry Johnson	Chairman of the British Railways Board; 1971–1976	Succeeded by Sir Peter Parker
