= Henry Johnson (railway executive) =

British railway executive (1906–1988)

Sir Henry Cecil Johnson KBE
- Born: 11 September 1906; Lavendon, Buckinghamshire, England
- Died: 13 March 1988 (aged 81); Great Missenden, Buckinghamshire, England
- Education: Bedford Modern School
- Occupation: Railway executive
- Years active: 1923–1971
- Known for: Chairman of British Rail
- Spouse: Evelyn Mary Morton (m. 1932)
- Children: 2

Sir Henry Cecil Johnson KBE (11 September 1906 – 13 March 1988), was a British railway executive who served as chairman of British Rail. Johnson began the sale and development of surplus railway land and established the British Rail Property Board in 1970. The finances of British Railways improved under Johnson's chairmanship and when he left in 1971, British Rail had a surplus of £9.7 million. Sir Peter Parker, a later Chairman, ‘admired his honesty and courage', describing him as ‘straight as a gun barrel’.

== Early life ==
Henry Cecil Johnson was born in Lavendon, Buckinghamshire on 11 September 1906, the son of William Longland and Alice Mary Johnson of Lavendon, Buckinghamshire. He was educated at Bedford Modern School.

== Career ==
Johnson joined the London and North Eastern Railway (LNER) as a traffic apprentice in 1923. After various posts in the Operating Department of LNER, Johnson was appointed Assistant Superintendent of Southern Area, LNER, in 1942. In 1955 he became Chief Operating Superintendent of the Eastern Region and later General Manager in 1958.

In 1962, Johnson became General Manager of the London Midland Region, and was also its Chairman between 1963 and 1967. He ‘took charge of the electrification of the Euston to Manchester and Liverpool line, the first main-line electrification, completed in 1966’. Johnson became Vice-Chairman of the British Railways Board in 1967 and was appointed its Chairman in 1968, a position he held until 1971.

The finances of British Railways improved under Johnson's chairmanship and when he left in 1971, British Rail had a surplus of £9.7 million. Although this was largely as a result of the Transport Act 1968, when grants were made to unprofitable passenger services providing a public service, Johnson astutely began the development of surplus railway land and established the British Rail Property Board in 1970. In the 1970s British Railways earned £20 million a year from land sales.

After British Railways, Johnson became Chairman of MEPC (1971–76) and held board positions at Lloyds Bank, the Trident Life Assurance Company and Imperial Life of Canada.

== Awards and honours ==
Johnson was appointed CBE in 1962, made Knight Bachelor in 1968 and KBE in 1972.

== Personal life ==
Known as Bill Johnson Sir Peter Parker, a later Chairman, ‘admired his honesty and courage', describing him as ‘straight as a gun barrel'. He was ‘extremely popular with the railway employees, who admired him as [then being] the only railwayman to have started at the bottom and worked his way up through the ranks to become Chairman of British Railways’.

Johnson was a member of the Marylebone Cricket Club and The Royal and Ancient Golf Club of St Andrews. The BBC's Your Paintings Series has a portrait of Johnson. In 1932 he married Evelyn Mary Morton and they had two daughters. He died on 13 March 1988 in Great Missenden, Buckinghamshire.

Business positions
Preceded by Sir Stanley Raymond	Chairman of the British Railways Board; 1967–1971	Succeeded by Sir Richard Marsh
Business positions
Preceded by ?	Chairman of the MEPC plc 1971–76	Succeeded by ?
