= 1971 Greenwich by-election =

UK Parliamentary by-election

The 1971 Greenwich by-election of 8 July 1971 was held after the Labour Member of Parliament (MP) Richard Marsh, resigned from the House of Commons to take up the post of Chairman of British Rail. The seat was retained by Labour.

== Result ==
Greenwich by-Election, 1971
Party	Candidate	Votes	%	±%
Labour	Guy Barnett	14,671	66.73	+10.98
Conservative	J Stuart Thom	6,150	27.97	−7.39
Fellowship	Ronald Mallone	792	3.60	New
Independent conservative	Reginald Simmerson	285	1.30	New
Independent	David Davies	89	0.40	New
Majority		8,521	38.76	+18.37
Turnout		21,987		
Labour hold		Swing		

== Previous election ==
General election 1970: Greenwich
Party	Candidate	Votes	%	±%
Labour	Richard Marsh	20,804	55.75	−9.11
Conservative	J Stuart Thom	13,195	35.36	+0.22
Liberal	P. Wylan	3,319	8.89	New
Majority		7,609	20.39	−7.33
Turnout		37,318	65.66	−2.04
Labour hold		Swing	-4.67	
