= History of rail transport in Great Britain 1948–1994 =

The history of rail transport in Great Britain 1948–1994 covers the period when the British railway system was nationalised under the name of 'British Railways', latterly known as British Rail until its eventual privatisation in 1994.

The railway system in this period underwent modernisation, reorganisation and rebranding, some of which proved controversial. The use of steam locomotives on the network also ended in this period. Due to falling passenger numbers, rail subsidies from the government were necessary to keep the railways financially viable. Concerns about the levels of these contributed to the Beeching cuts that closed down many less well used lines.

== The 1940s: Nationalisation ==
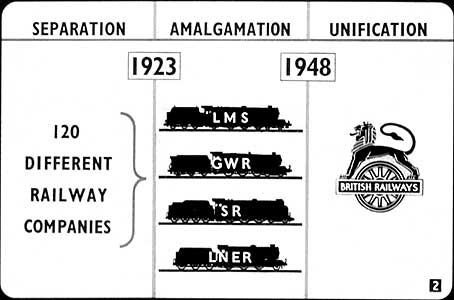
British Rail filmstrip showing how the railways were unified under BR

The Transport Act 1947 nationalised nearly all forms of mass transport in Great Britain and came into effect on 1 January 1948. British Railways came into existence as the business name of the Railway Executive of the British Transport Commission (BTC) on 1 January 1948 when it took over the assets of the Big Four railway companies.

A few independent light railways and industrial railways, which did not contribute significant mileage to the system, were not included in British Railways; nor the Glasgow Underground and London Underground, already both public concerns, the Liverpool Overhead Railway, and non-railway-owned tramways. The Northern Counties Committee lines owned by the London, Midland & Scottish Railway were sold to the Northern Ireland government, becoming part of the Ulster Transport Authority as a result of the Ireland Act 1949.

Under the BTC's Railway Executive, the railways were organised into six regions:

- Eastern Region (ER) – LNER lines south of Shaftholme Junction, Doncaster (region later amalgamated with the North Eastern Region)
- North Eastern Region (NER) – LNER lines in England north of Shaftholme Junction (region later amalgamated with the Eastern Region)
- London Midland Region (LMR) – LMS lines in England and Wales.
- Scottish Region (ScR) – LMS and LNER lines in Scotland
- Southern Region (SR) – Southern Railway lines
- Western Region (WR) – Great Western Railway lines

The first priority of the Railway Executive was to repair the infrastructure of the railways damaged by bombing, clear the backlog of maintenance that had built up, and make good losses in locomotives and rolling stock. The next priority was to attempt to unify the inherited railways of four separate and competing companies into one national network.

== The 1950s: Modernisation ==
By the start of the 1950s, British Railways were making a working profit, albeit a small one. However, Britain had fallen well behind the rest of Europe in terms of dieselisation and electrification of its railways. There were political as well as practical reasons behind the resistance to dieselisation in particular: the Labour Government of Clement Attlee did not want to significantly reduce the demand for domestically produced coal in favour of imported oil, thus both affecting the balance of payments and potentially causing unemployment. Robin Riddles, who was effectively the British Railways' Chief Mechanical Engineer, disagreed with the dieselisation programme, arguing that it would be too expensive to import oil given the large amounts of domestically available coal. He continued to order steam locomotives on a large scale and from 1948 to 1953, 1,487 steam locomotives were built.

Although the initial focus was on repairing and renewing, some pre-war capital investment schemes that had stopped upon the outbreak of hostilities were restarted, for example the Manchester–Sheffield–Wath electrification over the Woodhead route and the Great Eastern suburban electrification.

The new BR regions, formed largely around the management structures of the old "Big Four" companies, remained autonomous in terms both of organisation and production of locomotives and rolling stock, mostly continuing with pre-war designs – indeed, some designs were even older: the workhorse NER Class E1 was designed in 1898. As a whole, the equipment of the new British Railways was outdated, often unreliable, and mostly in urgent need of a refurbishment. Only the Southern Region with its large electrified suburban network in South London inherited from the Southern Railway operated a significant number of non-steam-powered trains.

In 1951, the British Transport Commission approved a new series of standard locomotives and coaches incorporating design features primarily from the London, Midland & Scottish Railway but also the other pre-nationalisation companies. These standard designs were designed to be long-lasting but in the event few served to their full potential before being withdrawn during the 1960s.

By the middle of the decade, however, it was clear that British Railways were in trouble, particularly in the freight haulage business to which they were losing ground to road and air traffic (the latter thanks to a postwar glut of available transport aircraft). The government ordered a review.

=== The Modernisation Plan ===
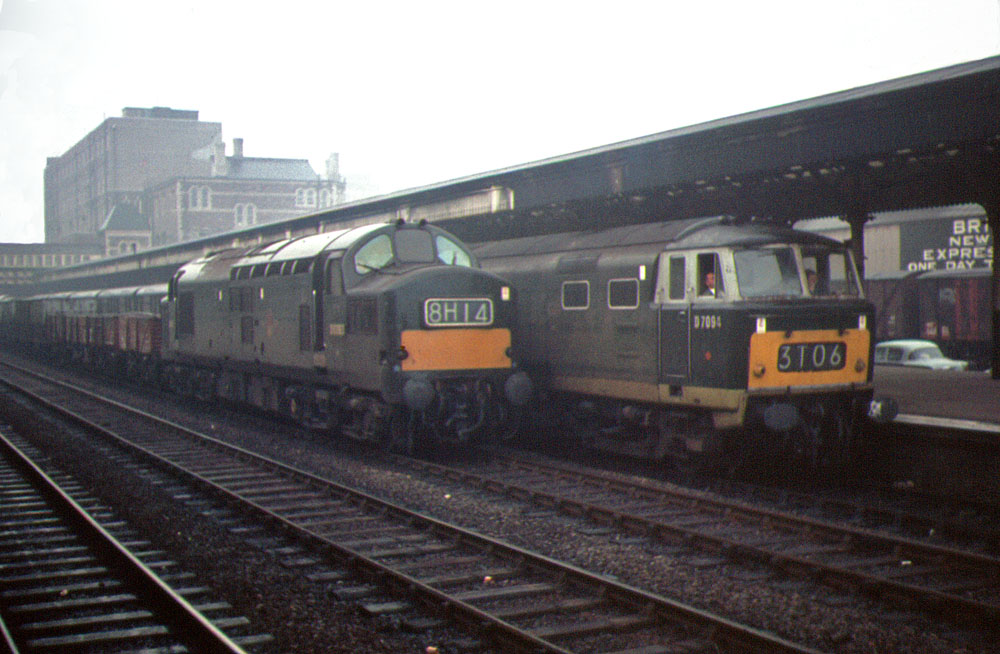
Class 37 and Class 35 diesels, two types ordered under the Modernisation Plan, at Newport in 1967.

The report formally known as Modernisation and Re-Equipment of the British Railways, more commonly the "Modernisation Plan", was published in December 1954. It was intended to bring the railway system up to date. A government white paper produced in 1956 stated that modernisation would help eliminate BR's financial deficit by 1962. The aim was to increase speed, reliability, safety and line capacity, through a series of measures that would make services more attractive to passengers and freight operators, thus recovering traffic that was being lost to the roads. The total cost of the plan was projected to be £1.24 billion (approximately £29 billion in 2020). The important areas were:

- Electrification of principal main lines, in the Eastern Region, Kent, Birmingham and Central Scotland;
- Large-scale dieselisation to replace steam locomotives;
- New passenger and freight rolling stock;
- Resignalling and track renewal;
- Closure of small number of lines that were seen as unnecessary in a nationalised network, as they duplicated other lines;
- Building of large freight marshalling yards, with automated shunting to streamline freight handling.

The plan was reappraised in 1959 and a progress report was published in 1961.

However, many railway historians including Christian Wolmar, Henshaw and others now regard it as a costly failure and a missed opportunity. An attempt was made to simply update the railways as they already stood rather than reacting to changes in the way goods and people were travelling in the post-war years. Massive investments were made in marshalling yards at a time when the small wagonload traffic which they dealt with was in steep decline and being lost rapidly to the roads. Others have taken a different view. In her book British Rail: The Nation's Railway, Tanya Jackson argues that the Modernisation Plan laid the foundations of the highly successful Inter-City operation as well as planting the seeds of modern industrial design in the railway organisation. This was to lead to British Rail producing its benchmark Corporate Identity Manual in the sixties. Above all, the Modernisation Plan endorsed the adoption and implementation of the 25 kV AC electrification system that has since been universally recognised as the modern standard.

==== Traction policy ====
The Modernisation Plan called for the large-scale introduction of diesel locomotives: a total of 2,500 locomotives for mainline service to be procured in 10 years at a cost of £125 million (£3 billion in 2020), plus the replacement of much of the existing pre-war passenger rolling stock with over 5,000 diesel or electric multiple units or new carriages at a further estimated cost of £285 million (£6.8 billion in 2020). The longer-term plan was to electrify all the major trunk routes, the important secondary lines and the remaining suburban systems, but the Plan initially called for the acquisition of 1,100 electric locomotives for £60 million (£1.4 billion in 2020) plus £125 million (£2.8 billion in 2020) for electric infrastructure. Diesel traction would therefore serve mainly as a stop-gap between steam and electric traction, remaining only for more minor routes, shunting and certain freight movements.

This was a major change from BR's existing traction policy, drawn up immediately after nationalisation, which had been based on perpetuating steam locomotives: existing locomotive designs from the Big Four continued to be built post-nationalisation, and then BR designed a new series of standard locomotive classes. Entering service in 1951, the Standards were intended to have a service life of 30 years and would be superseded by a rolling programme of electrification. In its early years BR largely halted the work done by the Big Four experimenting with diesel traction – completing pilot orders for prototypes such as those from the Southern Railway that became BR's Class D16/2 – but not perpetuating them. The exception was the continuation of the introduction of a series of diesel-powered shunting locomotives such as what would be the British Rail Class 08 and its variants, which entered service from 1951. The Modernisation Plan overturned this arrangement, even though many of the orders for the Standard steam locomotives were years from being fulfilled. Steam traction would now be replaced by diesels within a decade while the long-term electrification programme, while retained, would be slowed and scaled down. It was hoped that the rapid switch to diesel traction would deliver similar operational advantages and cost savings as electrification but at a faster pace and with much lower upfront capital costs. This committed many of the later-built Standard steam locomotives to be withdrawn having served only a third (or even less) of their intended service life.

Although not laid out in the published Modernisation Plan, BR's initial approach to this huge acquisition task was to implement a pilot scheme, commissioning orders for 171 (later increased to 174) diesel locomotives from six independent manufacturers (due to currency and political considerations these were all British firms, even though several had little or no experience of diesel locomotive design and building) plus BR's own design offices and workshops. These designs were spread across the three power categories BR had decided would fulfil its mainline motive power needs. The designs commissioned deliberately represented a diverse range of engineering approaches (electric and hydraulic transmissions, four-stroke and two stroke engines, high- or medium-speed engines etc.) with numerous constructors and suppliers of engines and electrical equipment. The intention was that the most successful designs and elements proven by the pilot scheme would form the basis of the large-scale orders called for by the Modernisation Plan over the next decade.

This policy was overtaken by political and economic events. BR's financial position was worsening as costs rose and traffic and revenue declined. BR's accounts had shown an overall negative balance since 1954 (−£23 million then, worsening to −£62 million by 1956) and in 1956 the organisation's net revenue fell into the negative for the first time: a loss of £16.5 million. Costs were still climbing, market share and volumes of both passenger and freight traffic were falling rapidly, and BR was facing a perpetual manpower shortage as the high employment and rising working and living standards and wages throughout the economy in the 1950s made working on the railways – especially the dirty, labour-intensive steam locomotives – unattractive. The railways were still suffering from a general public image of being outdated, inefficient and run down.

The British Transport Commission and BR management therefore decided to expand the pilot scheme to hasten the introduction of modern traction. In May 1957 – a month before the first locomotive ordered under the original pilot scheme (the first of the English Electric Type 1s) entered service – the total orders were increased to 230 and the power categories were expanded from three to five, introducing new mid- and high-power types that BR had not originally considered necessary. In late 1958, as BR's financial balance approached an annual loss of £100 million and still well before many of the locomotives ordered in 1955 under the original pilot scheme had been built, the BTC agreed to further accelerate the adoption of diesel traction by placing sufficient orders to introduce 2300 diesel locomotives by the end of 1963. Although some designs were not perpetuated in these bulk orders on the basis of the early experience with the pilot scheme, many of the types included in these orders had not yet entered full service and in some cases the prototype had yet to be built. Designs for the new Type 3 power rating – not present in the pilot scheme – were ordered in quantity 'off the drawing board' and only one Type 5 design was in existence (the production version of the DP1 prototype, the existence of which actually predated both the Modernisation Plan and the pilot scheme, even though it was not included in either).

With numerous manufacturers being required to produce their own designs to meet the deadline, the standardisation intended in the Modernisation Plan could not be achieved. The three standard classes originally planned – and even the five proposed in the revised plan – were replaced by a total of 14 distinct locomotive designs from numerous manufacturers, incorporating many of the diverse (and incompatible) features intended to be tested and evaluated against each other. This limited the theoretical operational benefits and cost savings from the widespread adoption of diesel traction, and many – but not all – of the designs ordered under the accelerated Modernisation Plan were plagued by reliability and service issues, leading to poor availability from the brand new locomotives and leaving some areas of the BR network with a shortage of serviceable traction in the early 1960s. Ironically, in 1967 British Railways drew up a National Traction Plan that rationalised its stock of locomotives and multiple units. Designs that had proved to be the most reliable and operationally efficient were selected for retention and modernisation while the others were designated 'non-standard' and earmarked for quick withdrawal and replacement – a belated implementation of the original pilot scheme that saw many of the locomotives ordered in the late 1950s withdrawn after only a decade in service and in some cases even before the steam locomotives they were intended to supersede.

There were some fundamental incorrect assumptions with the classes of new locomotives ordered under the Modernisation Plan. Steam locomotives were replaced by diesel types on a 'like-for-like' basis with BR ordering, for example, large numbers of light-duty diesels intended for local mixed-goods services (such as the Class 20 and Class 24), which failed to take into account the decline in local and branch line goods services that was largely switching to the roads. In conjunction with the new marshalling yards, large numbers of diesel shunters were ordered that soon became rendered virtually obsolete by the rise of container freight and, like the yards they worked in, often only served a few years before being scrapped.

==== Freight services ====
The Modernisation Plan failed to successfully redefine what the purpose of the railways was. British Railways remained bound by the Railway and Canal Traffic Acts that obligated it to provide carriage for virtually any type of goods, regardless of quantity (large or small) between any two stations on the network, at set and published rates. This legislation dated back to the 19th century to prevent the railways abusing their monopoly as the sole practical long-distance transport provider for much of the country, but the growth of road transport had left the railways locked into a highly disadvantageous position. Road freight operators had no legal restrictions and could turn down work that was uneconomic, which BR could not, and could easily undercut BR's carriage rates which the railway could not alter without legal consent.

The Railway and Canal Traffic Acts also saddled BR with the necessity to maintain thousands of goods yards and other facilities, plus rolling stock and staff to service them, even when there was ever-decreasing demand for those services and such traffic as did exist was rarely profitable. This issue had been identified during the Great Depression, and the Big Four had campaigned for repeal of the Railway and Canal Traffic Acts as a 'Fair Deal' during the 1930s. However, this did not happen until the Transport Act 1962 gave BR freedom of contract, and until then the Modernisation Plan had to commission locomotives, rolling stock and facilities to manage the ever-declining but legally required wagonload freight traffic.

The timing of the Modernisation Plan was also unfortunate, as just months after its publication the train drivers' trade union, ASLEF, called a strike that lasted for 17 days, causing major disruption to the network. Many of BR's long-standing freight customers – especially smaller business and industrial users which provided much of the remaining wagonload and less than carload freight traffic – were forced by necessity to start using road transport and never returned to the railways, which hastened the decline in railway freight traffic and rapidly undermined the logic and business case for the Plan's renewal and expansion of large marshalling yards.

==== Outcome ====
The Modernisation Plan was a hugely costly failure for BR. The total cost was greater than the estimate, eventually exceeding £1.6 billion (£33 billion in 2020), while the railways' financial losses (between £102 million and £68 million per year throughout the 1960s) increased as traffic volumes and market share continued to decline. While some of the new locomotives and rolling stock procured under the Plan were successful and would go on to have very long service lives, many proved to be embarrassing (and high-profile) failures. The modernisation of BR's freight-handling facilities was ineffective and even before the Plan was officially concluded, many of the large yards built a few years previously were mostly empty.

The comprehensive failure of the Plan to achieve its goals created a deep-seated distrust of BR's internal management within the Treasury and wider central government, causing BR's funding to be restricted and making any further large-scale investment to reform or modernise the railways virtually impossible – an attitude that was to dog BR for the rest of its existence. The Macmillan government responded to BR's financial issues and the failure of the Modernisation Plan by commissioning Richard Beeching to identify ways of stemming BR's losses and cutting operational costs, a very different premise from the large-scale investment and expansion of the Modernisation Plan.

==== Electrification ====
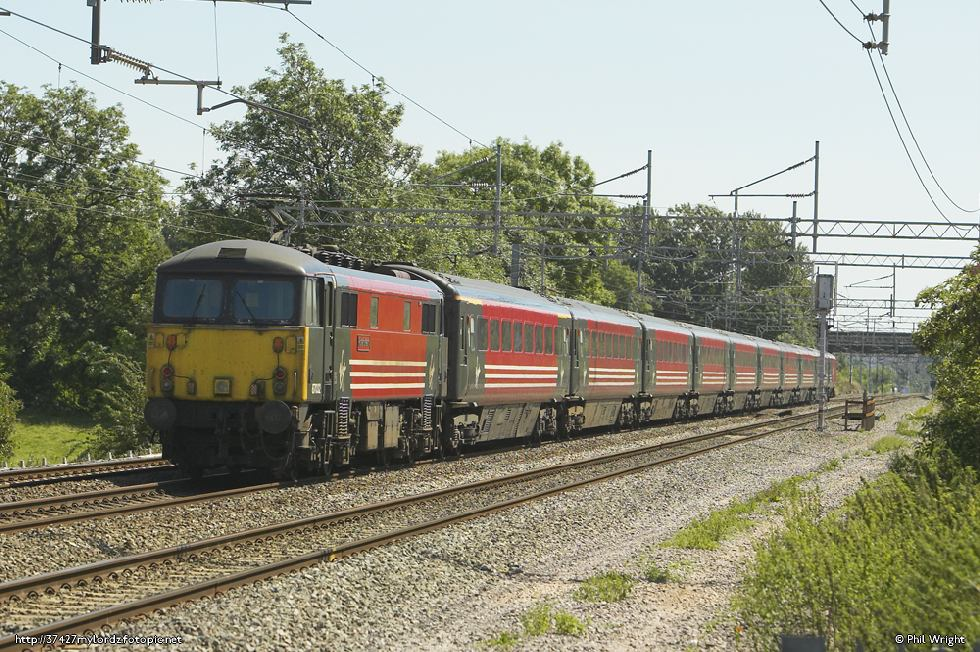
Virgin Trains West Coast Class 87 electric locomotive and Mark 3 coaches

The Modernisation Plan called for significant suburban and main-line electrification. Despite investment in two 1.5 kV DC overhead schemes only a few years earlier, outside the Southern Region this was mostly done with the new standard 25 kV AC overhead line equipment (OLE), leaving these two older systems obsolescent.

In the Eastern region the plan called for electrification of many routes to this standard. These included the London, Tilbury and Southend (LTS) line; suburban lines out of London Liverpool Street, recently partially electrified on the 1.5 kV DC system, were upgraded initially to a mix of 6.25 kV AC and 25 kV AC OLE and extended. The London King's Cross suburban lines were electrified at 25 kV AC in the 1970s.

In the Scottish region electrification of large parts of the Glasgow Suburban was called for again at 25 kV AC OLE, which would over time grow into a large system.

In the Southern Region the already extensive third rail system was to be extended to the Kent Coast.

In addition to the suburban electrification, main line electrification was called for, starting with the West Coast Main Line. This was done in stages from 1959 to 1974, initially connecting Birmingham, Manchester and Liverpool to London, and going on to Glasgow.

The continuing electrification programme of the 1980s which saw the electrification of the East Coast Main Line, London St Pancras suburban system and further extension of the Southern Region network can be seen as a direct extension of this plan.

=== Other events ===
Two serious crashes, the Harrow and Wealdstone rail crash in 1952 (in which 112 people died) and the Lewisham rail crash in 1957 (in which 90 people died), led to the introduction of the Automatic Warning System across the network.

In 1958 the region boundaries were redrawn to make them geographical rather than based on pre-nationalisation ownership. Former LMS lines in Yorkshire were transferred from the London Midland to the Eastern and North Eastern region: the London Midland region gained the former Great Central Railway lines outside Yorkshire and Lincolnshire from the Eastern Region in return. Former LMS lines in the south-west of the country, including the northern section of the Somerset and Dorset Joint Railway, were transferred to the Western region.

Some routes were closed during the 1950s to take account of changing transport patterns and to remove obvious route duplication. For instance, in East Anglia most of the former Midland and Great Northern Joint Railway was closed in 1959; long-distance passenger trains on the former Great Central Railway main line ended in 1960 as a prelude to its later closure. However, the route closures were just a small taste of what was to come.

== The 1960s: Rationalisation ==
=== The Beeching reports ===
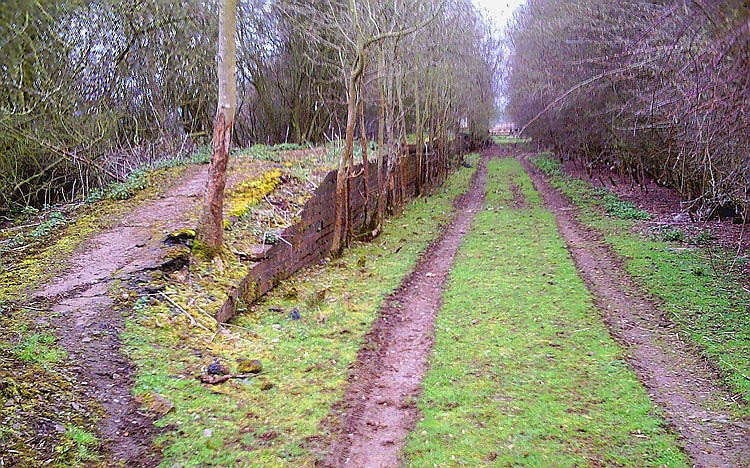
The overgrown remains of Lilbourne station in Northamptonshire, one of thousands of rural stations which were closed

Network for development proposed in 1965 report "Beeching II" plans, shown in bold

By 1960, the railway's performance was low, with a deficit of £68m. This increased to £87m in 1961 and still further to £104m in 1962 (£1.94 billion in 2025 terms). Under the Transport Act of 1962, Harold Macmillan's Conservative government dissolved the British Transport Commission, and created the British Railways Board to take over its railway duties from 1 January 1963.

The railway's huge deficit and the reputation earned during the Modernisation Plan fiasco for bad financial planning led the government to take firm action. In 1961, the Transport Minister Ernest Marples appointed Richard Beeching as head of British Railways with a brief to cut the spiralling losses. Beeching was a businessman rather than a railwayman and his high salary (particularly in a nationalised industry) caused controversy. His report The Reshaping of British Railways (commonly known simply as "The Beeching Report") issued in 1963, concluded that much of the railway network carried little traffic and should be closed down. His report proposed a massive closures programme which would involve 5,000 miles of track, and 2,363 small stations being closed, which came to be known as the Beeching axe. The report also proposed that British Rail electrify some major main lines and adopt containerised freight traffic instead of outdated and uneconomic wagon-load traffic. The closures recommended by the report were mostly implemented. They peaked in the mid-1960s and continued until the early 1970s. By 1975, the system had shrunk to 12,000 miles (19,000 km) of track and 2,358 stations. In the event, the closures failed to produce the hoped for savings, or to restore the railways to profitability.

In 1965, Beeching issued a second, less well-known, report The Development of the Major Railway Trunk Routes, widely known as "Beeching II", which singled out lines that were believed to be worthy of continued large-scale investment. This did not recommend closures as such, but outlined a 3,000-mile "network for development". The fate of the remaining network was not discussed in the report.

=== Modernisation continues ===
The late 1950s to the end of the 1960s saw first a reduction, then the final withdrawal of Britain's fleet of steam locomotives. Mass withdrawals of older classes started towards the end of the 1950s, with many of the pre-grouping companies' engines being scrapped. BR built its last steam engine, appropriately named Evening Star at Swindon Works in 1960, by early 1966 the Western Region was the first to have no steam locomotives at all and the last pocket of steam traction was withdrawn in the North-West of England in 1968. The short narrow-gauge Vale of Rheidol Railway at Aberystwyth in Wales was the only exception: it was still steam-operated on its sale by BR in 1989.

The new diesel locomotives, so troublesome during the Modernisation Plan years, were becoming more reliable and the closure of so many routes after the Beeching Report meant that the required fleet reduced significantly, and by the end of the 1960s, all the pre-nationalisation rolling stock had been replaced with the new standard patterns.

In the early 1960s yellow warning panels, now characteristic of British railways, were added to the fronts of diesel and electric locomotives and multiple units in order to increase the safety of track workers.

The Transport Act 1962 converted British Railways from being the trade name of a BTC activity to a separate public corporation, as the British Railways Board. As the last steam locomotives were withdrawn, the corporation's public name was re-branded in 1965 as British Rail (see British Rail brand names for a full history). This re-branding introduced the double-arrow logo to represent the industry as a whole; the standardised Rail Alphabet typeface used for all communications and signs; and the BR blue livery, which was applied to nearly all locomotives and rolling stock.

A minor reorganisation in 1967 saw the North Eastern region become part of the Eastern region.

== The 1970s: HST and APT ==
The 1970s saw British Rail successfully introduce high speed diesel train services, as well as major resignalling projects designed to increase operational efficiency. In 1976, the InterCity 125 High Speed Train (HST) was introduced on some services and the InterCity brand was adopted. This created an increase in passengers using the railways and improved British Rail's finances. British Rail also started development of the world's first tilting train – the Advanced Passenger Train (APT). However, lack of money, political pressure and the launch of the prototype into passenger service before technical problems were fully overcome led to the project being cancelled in the early 1980s.

The major engineering works of BR were split-off into a separate company, British Rail Engineering Limited, in 1970. This was subsequently split further, becoming British Rail Maintenance Limited, whose ownership was retained by British Rail; and British Rail Engineering (1988) Limited, which was prepared for privatisation. The latter went through a series of owners, mergers and take-overs and now resides with Canadian transport company Bombardier.

In 1973, the TOPS computer system for managing locomotives and rolling stock owned by a rail system, was introduced. Hauled rolling stock continued to carry numbers in a separate series. The adoption of the TOPS system made for some changes in the way the railway system in Britain worked. Hitherto, locomotives were numbered in three different series. Steam locomotives carried unadorned numbers up to five digits long. Diesel locomotives carried four-digit numbers prefixed with a letter 'D' and electric locomotives with a letter 'E'. Thus, up to three locomotives could carry the same number – steam loco 4321, diesel D4321 and electric loco E4321. TOPS could not handle this and it also required similar locomotives to be numbered in a consecutive series in terms of classification, in order that they might be treated together as a group. A new classification system was devised in which, for example, all Brush Type 4 locomotives were now called Class 47 and all had numbers beginning 47xxx.

=== The Intercity 125 High Speed Train ===
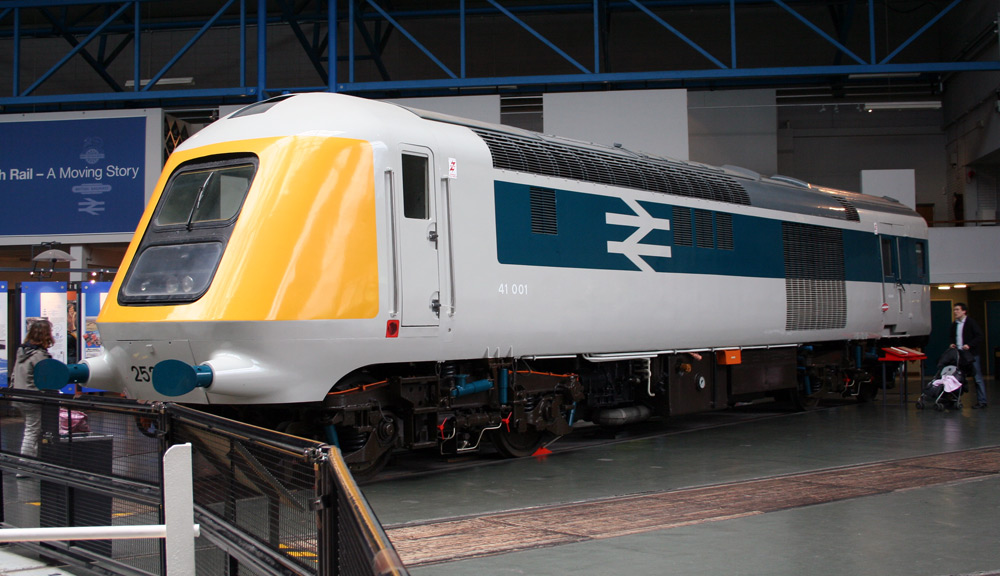
Prototype High Speed Train powercar

The InterCity 125 was planned as a stop gap measure, meant to fill until electrification was spread across all main lines and the Advanced Passenger Train (APT) was in service. Research had begun for the tilting train but it was not possible to predict when the APT would enter service. The HST applied what had been learned so far to traditional technology – a parallel project to the APT development, based on conventional principles but incorporating the newly discovered knowledge of wheel/rail interaction and suspension design. The class holds the world record for diesel traction, achieving 148.4 mph (238 km/h) with a shortened set running speed trials between Darlington and York. Unlike the APT, the InterCity 125 was an outstanding success and was still in widespread use in as of 2017.

The HST was introduced from 1976 on the Great Western Main Line between London Paddington and Bristol Temple Meads/Swansea, at a time when the maximum speed of British trains was 100 mph (160 km/h). A radical update of the standard BR livery was complemented by the 'InterCity 125' branding which also appeared on timetables and promotional literature. By May 1977 the full complement was in service on the GWML and they completely replaced locomotive hauled trains on the Bristol/South Wales routes.

Production continued, allowing the InterCity 125s to take over routes on the East Coast Main Line from 1978. They soon displaced the Class 55 locomotives to lesser workings and reduced the journey time to Edinburgh by up to an hour. The HSTs also took over routes on other West of England services from 1979, Cross-Country express trains from 1981 and finally the Midland Main Line services.

The increased speed and rapid acceleration and deceleration slashed journey times around the country. BR enjoyed a boom in patronage on the routes operated by the HSTs and InterCity's profits jumped accordingly – with cross-subsidisation in turn safeguarding the future of remaining rural routes which had been under threat of closure since the Beeching Axe of the 1960s. However, by 1986/87, InterCity was losing £100m a year before interest, contributing to British Rail's £720m deficit.

=== The Advanced Passenger Train ===
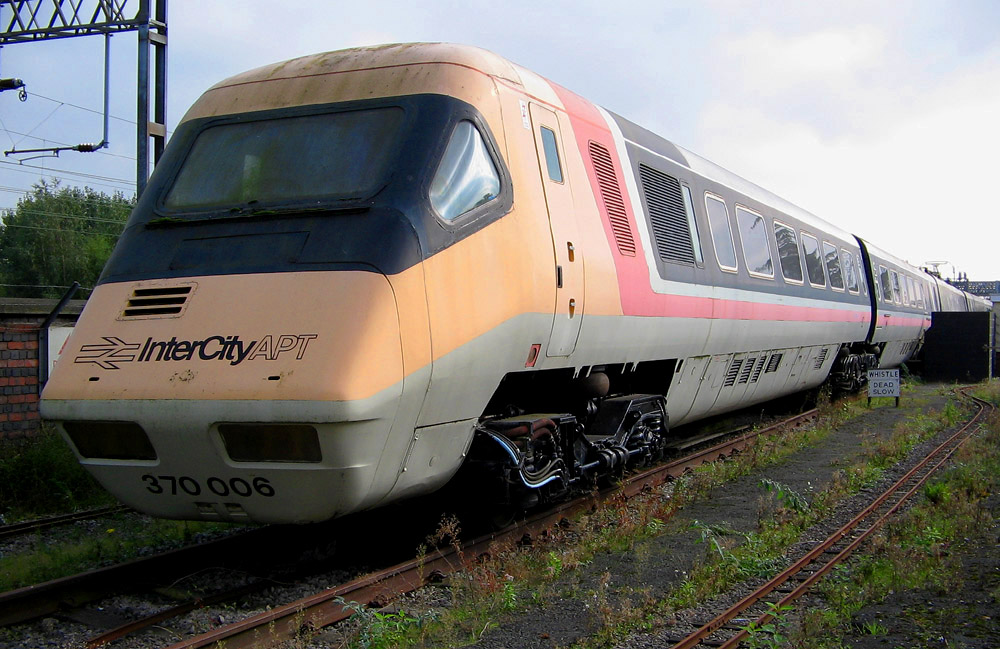
Prototype Advanced Passenger Train

In the 1970s, British Rail developed tilting train technology in the Advanced Passenger Train; there had been earlier experiments and prototypes in other countries, notably Italy. The objective of the tilt was to minimise the discomfort to passengers caused by taking the curves of the West Coast Main Line at high speed. The APT also had hydrokinetic brakes, which enabled the train to stop from 150 mph within existing signal spacings.

The introduction into service of the Advanced Passenger Train was to be a three-stage project. Phase 1, the development of an experimental APT (APT-E), was completed. This used a gas turbine-electric locomotive, the only multiple unit so powered that was used by British Rail. It was formed of two power cars (numbers PC1 and PC2), initially with nothing between them and later, two trailer cars (TC1 and TC2). The cars were made of aluminium to reduce the weight of the unit and were articulated. The gas turbine was dropped from development, due to excessive noise and the high fuel costs of the late 1970s. The APT-E first ran on 25 July 1971. The train drivers' union, ASLEF, black-listed the train due to its use of a single driver. The train was moved to Derby (with the aid of a locomotive inspector). This triggered a one-day strike by ASLEF that cost BR more than the research budget for the entire year.

Phase 2, the introduction of three prototype trains (APT-P) into revenue service on the Glasgow – London Euston route, did occur. Originally, there were to have been eight APT-P sets running, with minimal differences between them and the main fleet. However, financial constraints lead to only three being authorised, after two years of discussion by the British Railways Board. The cost was split equally between the Board and the Ministry of Transport. After these delays, considerable pressure grew to put the APT-P into revenue-service before they were fully ready. This inevitably lead to high-profile failures as a result of technical problems.

These failures led to the trains being withdrawn from service while the problems were ironed out. However, by this time, managerial and political support had evaporated. Consequently, phase 3, the introduction of the Squadron fleet (APT-S), did not occur, and the project was ended in 1982.

Although the APT never properly entered service, the experience gained enabled the construction of other high-speed trains. The APT powercar technology was imported without the tilt into the design of the Class 91 locomotives, and the tilting technology was incorporated first into Italian State Railway's Pendolino trains, which entered service in 1987, and subsequently in the UK in the design of the Class 390 units which operate on the West Coast Main Line today.

== The 1980s: Sectorisation ==
During the 1980s, the regions of BR were abolished and the system sectorised into business sectors. The passenger sectors were InterCity (express services), Network SouthEast (London commuter services) and Regional Railways (regional services). Trainload Freight took trainload freight, Railfreight Distribution took non-trainload freight, Freightliner took intermodal traffic and Rail Express Systems took parcels traffic. The maintenance and remaining engineering works were split off into a new company, British Rail Maintenance Limited. The new sectors were further subdivided into divisions. This ended the BR blue period as new liveries were adopted gradually. Infrastructure remained the responsibility of the regions until the "Organisation for Quality" initiative in 1991, when this too was transferred to the sectors.

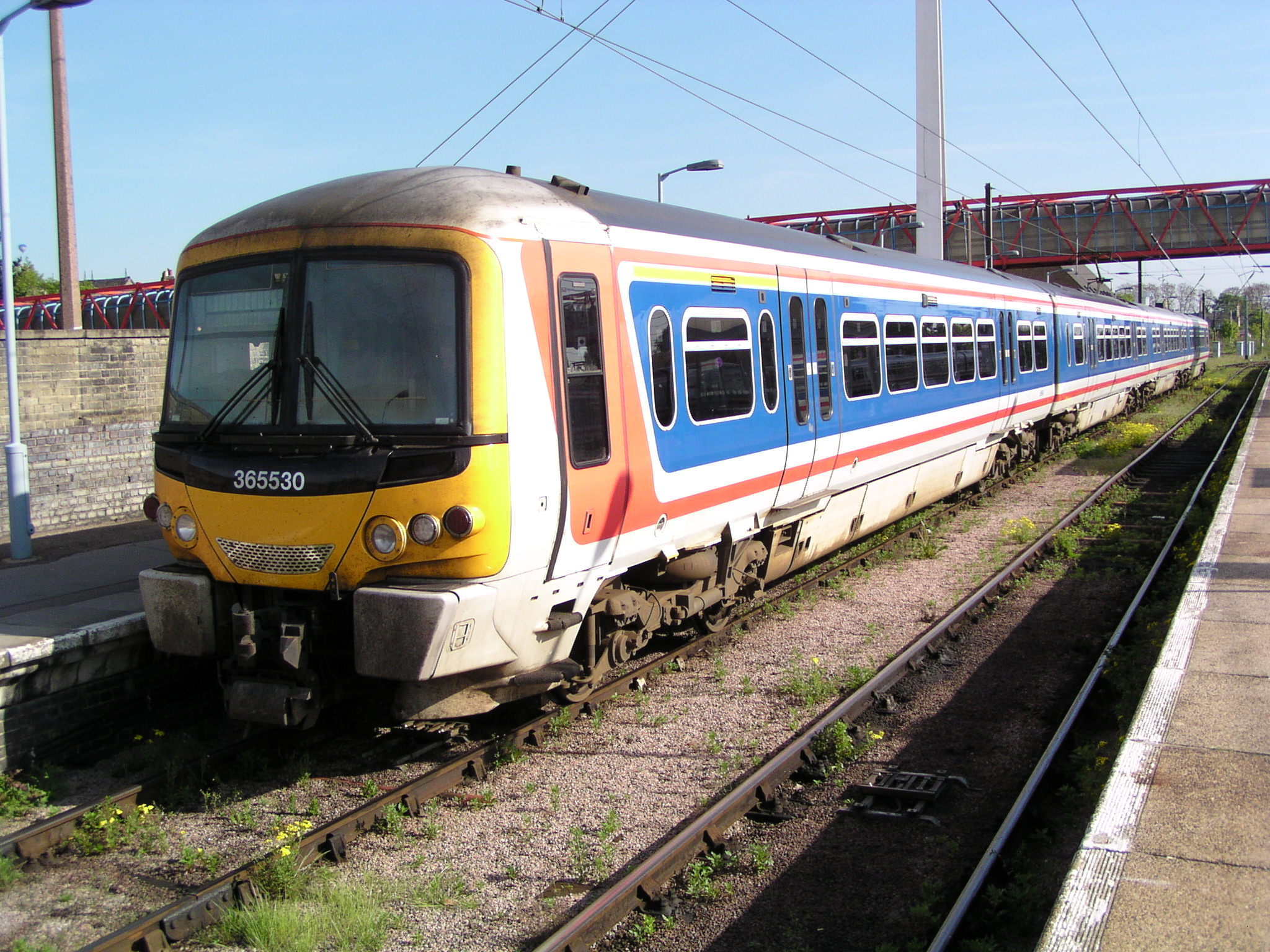
Networker in Network SouthEast livery

In the early 1980s, under the government of Margaret Thatcher, the possibility of more Beeching-style cuts was raised again briefly. In 1983 Sir David Serpell, a civil servant who had worked with Dr Beeching, compiled what became known as the Serpell Report which called for more rail closures. The report was met with fierce resistance from many quarters, and it was quickly abandoned. Prices rose quickly in this period, rising 108% in real terms from 1979 to 1994, as prices rose by 262% but RPI only increased by 154% in the same time.

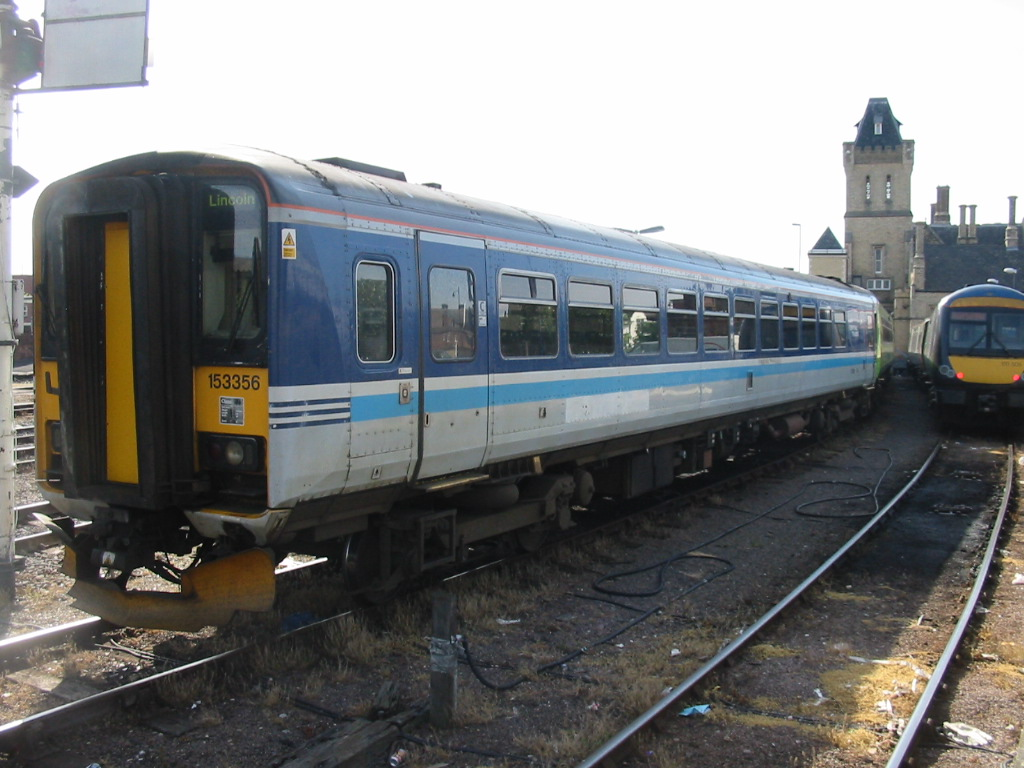
Super Sprinter in Regional Railways livery

Much of the rolling stock of BR was becoming increasingly obsolete and nearing the end of its life. An attempt at a cheap DMU replacement was made with the Pacer—essentially a modified bus body mounted on a rigid 4-wheel freight wagon chassis—which met with customer dissatisfaction. However, more successful stock, such as the Sprinter DMU, the Networker DMUs, and EMUs were introduced.

To considerable surprise, the Thatcher government, which had been perceived as anti-rail, authorised the electrification of the East Coast Main Line including the line from Doncaster to Leeds from 1985, with the work completed in 1991. At a regional level, Network SouthEast undertook numerous electrification projects, including the Midland Main Line to Bedford and the Southern 750 V DC system reached Hastings and Weymouth. Electrification in East Anglia included the line from London Liverpool Street to Norwich and also to King's Lynn. Thameslink, a service that connected the northern and southern halves of London's suburban network, was introduced via the re-opened Snow Hill tunnel in 1988. The Chiltern Main Line was extensively modernised to open up an additional link between London Marylebone and Birmingham Snow Hill. The service was successfully launched in 1987.

=== Clapham Junction accident ===
In 1988, the Clapham Junction rail crash killed 35 people when three commuter trains collided, the worst railway accident in Britain in 30 years. The recommendations of the subsequent inquiry had far-reaching effects.

The inquiry was chaired by QC Anthony Hidden and published a report in September 1989. It found that the direct cause of the disaster was sloppy work practices in which an old wire, incorrectly left in place after rewiring work and still connected at the supply end, created a false feed to a signal relay, thereby causing its signal to show green when it should have shown red. A contributing technical factor was the lack of double switching in the signal relay circuits, which would have prevented a single false feed causing an accident.

The inquiry recommended the introduction of the Automatic Train Protection (ATP) system, although it is not certain this would have prevented the accident (ATP guards against driver error, not installation error). Following the Clapham Junction accident and two other fatal accidents in early 1989, British Rail was keen to implement the ATP system across the entire British railway network. However, the then Conservative government, which was preparing the company for privatisation, baulked at the cost (estimated at over £1bn). In the end, two different proprietary systems were trialled, TBL on the Great Western Main Line and SELCAB on the Chiltern Main Line, but neither system was rolled out across the network. Today, all Great Western Railway HSTs are fitted with ATP and are not permitted to carry passengers unless the system is functioning.

The Hidden report also reacted to criticism of the 1950s-designed Mk 1 coaching stock involved in the accident. The report accepted that withdrawal of the Mark 1 units was not practical and the design was safe: "The inventory of Mark I coaching stock is large, and much of it has not reached an end of economic life, nor will do so for another decade or more. Mark I vehicles have good riding qualities, and are not intrinsically lacking in collision resistance." British Rail was still using multiple units with underframes that had been constructed before World War II and these had priority for replacement.

== The 1990s: Privatisation ==
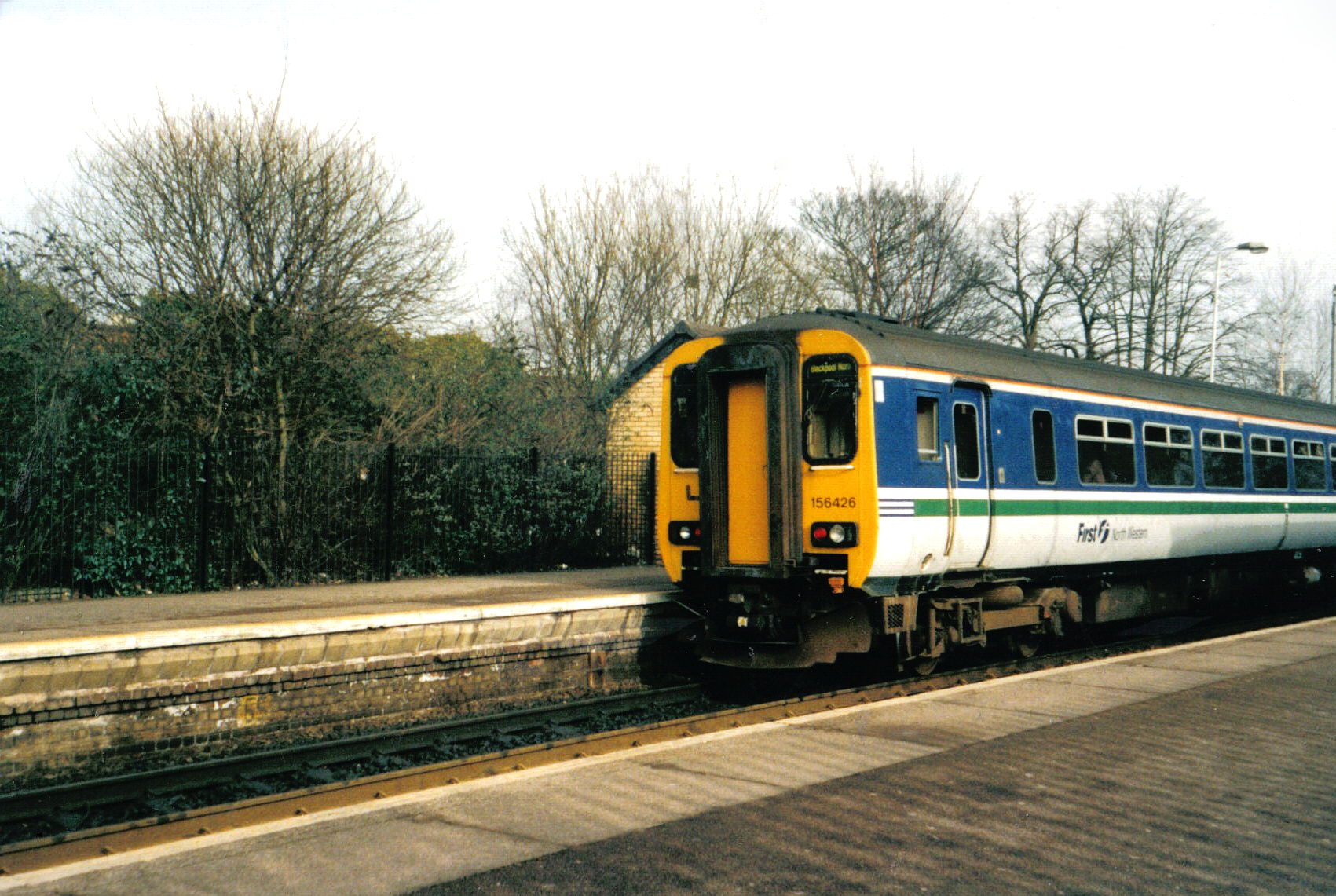
A First North Western Class 156 at Romiley Junction station, near Manchester in the year 2001. It is in its former Regional Railways North West livery.

The first half of the 1990s was dominated by the privatisation of British Rail by the government of John Major. The privatisation was the result of the Railways Act 1993 and the operations of the British Railways Board (BRB) were broken up and sold off. (Some "non-core" parts of the BRB's operations, such as its hotels, had been sold off by the administration of Margaret Thatcher in the early 1980s.)

In 1990, Margaret Thatcher was replaced by John Major as Prime Minister. The Thatcher administration had already sold off nearly all the former state-owned industries, apart from the national rail network. In its manifesto for the 1992 general election the Conservatives included a commitment to privatise the railways, but were not specific about details. They unexpectedly won the election on 9 April 1992 and, consequently, had to develop a plan to carry out the privatisation before the Railways Bill was published the next year. The management of British Rail strongly advocated privatisation as one entity, a British Rail PLC in effect. John Major favoured the resurrection of something like the "Big Four" companies that had existed before 1948. The Treasury advocated the creation of seven, later 25, passenger railway franchises as a way of maximising revenue. The Treasury view prevailed.

Despite privatisation being on the agenda, in Yorkshire the Wharfedale line was electrified starting in 1994 by British Rail. A follow on from the Chiltern Main Line upgrade was to be the nationwide roll-out of the Automatic Train Protection system, which helped prevent accidents caused by Signals Passed at Danger (SPADs). However, privatisation intervened and this plan was abandoned. A lack of resources also led to the cancellation during the planning stage of other major infrastructure refurbishment projects, including Crossrail, an east–west line through London which eventually opened in May 2022. The InterCity 250 upgrade to the West Coast Main Line was also cancelled, this instead ran as the West Coast Main Line upgrade which allowed tilting Pendolinos to run at 125 mph .

The Railways Bill established a complex structure for the rail industry. British Rail was broken up and sold to private companies, splitting the structure into over 100 separate companies. There were some regulatory mechanisms: contracts for the use of railway facilities must be approved or directed by the Office of Rail Regulation, although some facilities are exempt from this requirement. Contracts between the principal passenger train operators and the state are called "franchise agreements", which specify minimum service levels, and the amount of subsidy / premium to be paid over the course of the franchise. Franchises were first the responsibility of the Office of Passenger Rail Franchising, then its successor the Strategic Rail Authority and now with the Secretary of State for Transport. Initially, British Rail was broken up into various units frequently based on its own organisational sectors, still controlled by the British Railways Board, but which were sold off over the next few years.

The passage of the Railways Bill was controversial and there was much lobbying against the Bill. The Labour Party opposed its passage and promised to renationalise the railways, as and when resources allowed, when it returned to government. This commitment, however, did not make it to the party's manifesto for the 1997 general election and was not achieved during their period in government between 1997 and 2010. The Railways Bill became the Railways Act on 5 November 1993, and the organisational structure dictated by it came into effect on 1 April 1994.

== See also ==
- History of rail transport in Great Britain
- History of rail transport
- British Rail locomotive and multiple unit numbering and classification

== Sources ==
- Wolmar, Christian (2022). BRITISH RAIL-A new History. [S.l.]: MICHAEL JOSEPH. ISBN 978-0-241-45620-0. OCLC 1246353492.
- Henshaw, David (1994). The Great Railway Conspiracy: The Fall and Rise of Britain's Railways Since the 1950s (2nd ed.). Hawes, North Yorkshire: Leading Edge Press. ISBN 0-948135-30-1.
- Wolmar, Christian. (1996). The great British railway disaster. Shepperton: Ian Allan. ISBN 0711024693. OCLC 60283836.
- Gourvish, Terry (2002). British Rail: 1974–97: From Integration to Privatisation. Oxford: Oxford University Press. ISBN 0-19-926909-2.
- Body, Geoffrey (1981). Advanced Passenger Train: The official illustrated account of British Rail's revolutionary new 155mph train. Weston-super-Mare: Avon-Anglia Publications & Services. ISBN 0-905466-37-3.
- Williams, Hugh (1985). APT: A Promise Unfulfilled. London: Ian Allan. ISBN 0-7110-1474-4.
- Potter, Stephen (1987). On the Right Lines?: The limits of technological innovation. London: Frances Pinter. ISBN 0-86187-580-X.
- "British Railways Board history". The National Archives. Archived from the original on 14 October 2006.
- Wilson, David C. "Forward! The Revolution in the Lives of the Footplatemen 1962–1996" Sutton Publishing, Stroud, 1996. ISBN 0-7509-1144-1
