= Pat Collins =

Pat Collins may refer to:

- Pat Collins (baseball) (1896–1960), American baseball catcher
- Pat Collins (American football) (1941–2026), American football coach
- Pat Collins (lighting designer) (1932–2021), American lighting designer
- Pat Collins (showman) (1859–1943), British politician and fairground industry member
- Pat Collins (film critic) (born 1943), American film critic
- G. Pat Collins (1895–1959), American actor
- Pat Collins (hypnotist) (1935–1997), American hypnotist
- Patricia Hill Collins (born 1948), American sociologist
- Patricia M. Collins (1927–2024), American politician
- Pat Collins (director), Irish film director
- Pat Collins (journalist), American journalist

== See also ==
- Patrick Collins (disambiguation)
- Collins (surname)
