= Grace Neutral =

British tattoo artist

- Born: Grace Walker; 29 March 1989 (age 37); Dubai, United Arab Emirates
- Occupations: Tattoo artist; model; presenter; tattoo enthusiast
- Website: www.instagram.com/GraceNeutral

Grace Walker (born 29 March 1989), known professionally as Grace Neutral, is a British television presenter, model, and hand-poke tattoo artist based in the United Kingdom. She holds a substantial social media presence with over half a million followers. In 2016, Neutral was the presenter in an i-D magazine documentary Beyond Beauty.

== Personal life ==
Neutral was born in Dubai and spent most of her childhood traveling around the world with her family as her father was a captain in the Merchant Navy. Later, they returned to England, settling in the village of Newton Ferrers in Devon, and Grace attended the independent school Plymouth College. At the age of 20, she relocated to London. Neutral began ballet dancing at a young age going on to take classes at Italia Conti Academy of Theatre Arts and summer school at the Royal Ballet, eventually sustaining a hip injury that ended her ballet career at age 14. After this injury she start attending punk and alternative gigs at The Phoenix Tavern in Plymouth and became more interested in various aspects of alt culture such as tattoos and other body modifications and culture, which later became the focus of her career. In 2008 she moved to Bristol where she enrolled on a stage makeup course at City of Bristol College, before moving to London in 2010 where she got a job at the café in Madame Tussauds. Neutral has numerous extreme body modifications including a bifurcated tongue, tattooed eyes, reconstructed ears, a removed navel, and facial scarification.

== Career ==
Neutral entered the body modification industry as a piercer before hand-poke tattooing, a machine-free tattooing method. Following her move to London, she gained an apprenticeship as a piercer at Self Sacrifice Tattoo after being handed a flyer on Oxford Street and then going in to inquire about work. There she was trained by Ala who was a member of The Psycho Cyborgs performance arts troupe which further piqued her interest in the body modification lifestyle. In 2011 she was working as a piercer at Pure Ink and was asked to model for Alex MacNaughton's 'London Tattoos' book, after which she was put on the cover. Neutral also worked for Good Times Tattoo and attended the London Tattoo Convention with them in 2014.

Neutral is the founder of Femme Fatale Studio.

=== Television and film appearances ===
In 2012 she co-starred in Idles music video for their song "26/27" alongside a group of her Bristol based female friends, filmed on location at their home and directed by former Tracey Beaker star Felix Drake. In 2015, she was featured in the Phaze What music video Tokyo. She is the presenter of i-D magazine documentary series Beyond Beauty, which launched on the i-D YouTube channel.

Neutral's documentary Beyond Beauty with i-D magazine aired on Viceland in 2016. She is currently the presenter of Needles and Pins, a Viceland series documenting tattoo culture across the globe. In 2021 she sat as a subject on Season 8 of Sky Arts' Portrait Artist of the Year.

She currently has her own YouTube channel, FFTV, showcasing the stories behind tattoos and the people who wear them. Its flagship YouTube series Under Your Skin features in-depth, unfiltered conversations with high-profile guests as they get tattooed, including Daisy May Cooper, Denzel Curry, Rosie Jones, Joe Talbot from IDLES, Eliza Rose, Cat Burns, Headie One, Zheani, Jamali Maddix, Rag 'n' Bone Man, Noodles from The Offspring and Laura Whitmore. Since its launch, FFTV has gained millions of views across YouTube, Instagram, and TikTok.

== Books ==
- Neutral (2019)
