= Beeching cuts =

1960s rail restructure in Great Britain

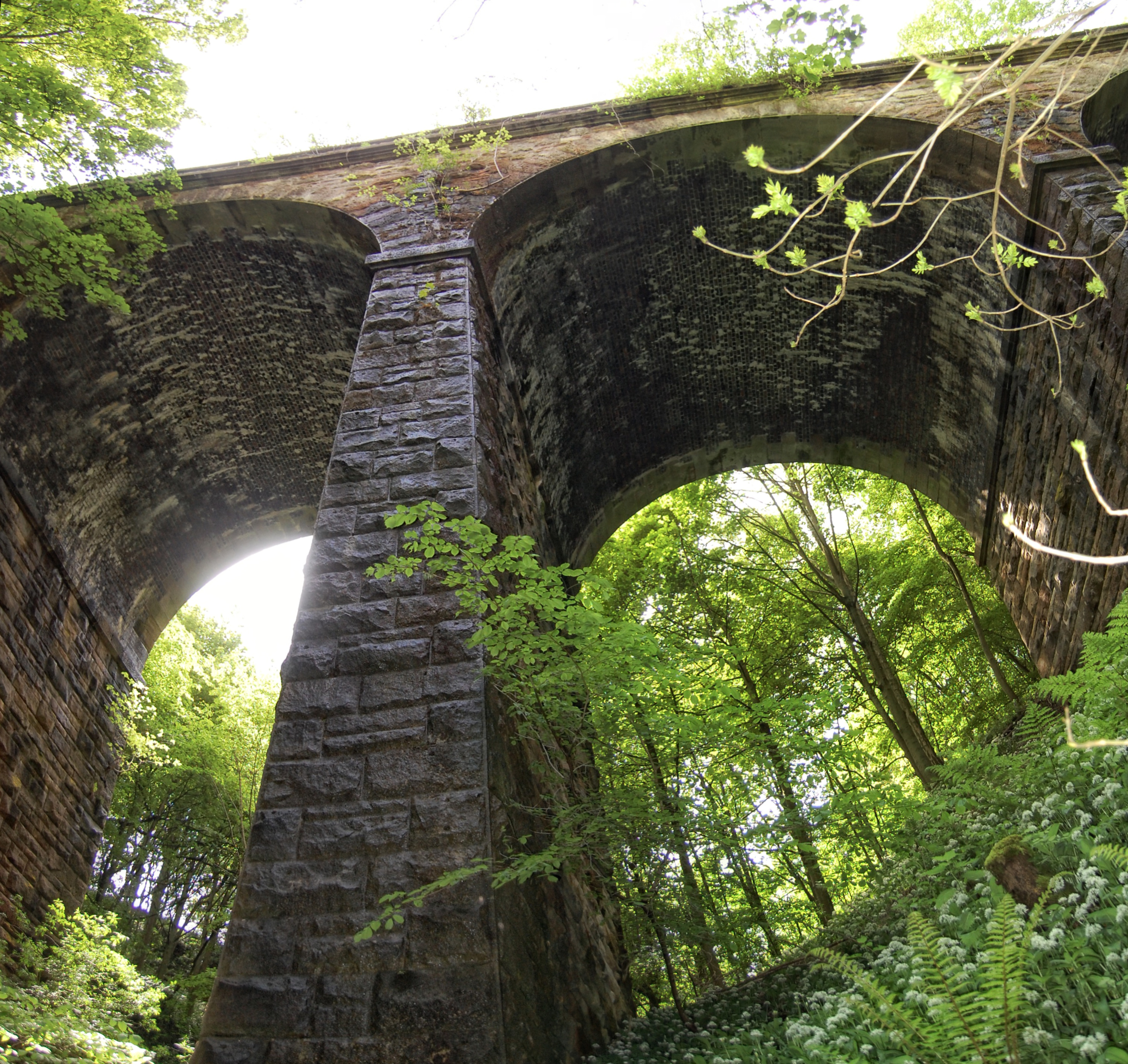
The overgrown viaduct across Lobb Ghyll on the Skipton–Ilkley line in Yorkshire, built by the Midland Railway in 1888 and closed in 1965

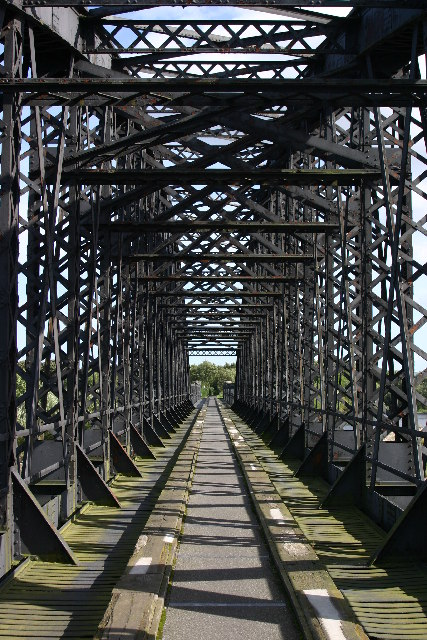
The Spey Viaduct, Moray, closed in 1965

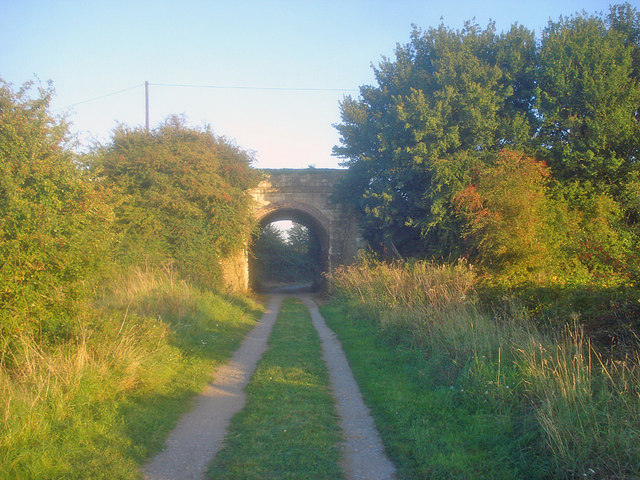
The former Chippenham and Calne line in Wiltshire is now a cycleway.

The Beeching cuts, also referred to as the Beeching Axe, were a major series of route closures and service changes made as part of the restructuring of the nationalised railway system in Great Britain in the 1960s. They are named after Richard Beeching, then-chair of the British Railways Board and the author of two reports – The Reshaping of British Railways (1963) and The Development of the Major Railway Trunk Routes (1965) – that set out proposals for restructuring the railway network, with the stated aim of improving economic efficiency.

The first report identified 2,363 stations and 5,000 miles (8,000 km) of railway line for closure, amounting to 55% of stations, 30% of route miles, and the loss of 67,700 British Rail jobs, with an objective of stemming the large losses being incurred during a period of increasing competition from road transport and reducing the rail subsidies necessary to keep the network running. The second report identified a small number of major routes for significant investment. Such was the scale of these cuts that the programme came to be known as the Beeching Axe, though the 1963 report also recommended some less well-publicised changes; including a switch to the now-standard practice of containerisation for rail freight, and the replacement of some services with integrated bus services linked to the remaining railheads.

Protests resulted in the saving of some stations and lines, but the majority were closed as planned. Beeching's name remains associated with the mass closure of railways and the loss of many local services in the period that followed. A few of these routes have since reopened. Some short sections have been preserved as heritage railways, while others have been incorporated into the National Cycle Network or used for road schemes. Others have since been built over, have reverted to farmland, or remain derelict with no plans for any reuse or redevelopment. Some, such as the bulk of the Midland Metro network around Birmingham and Wolverhampton, have since been incorporated into light rail lines.

== Background ==
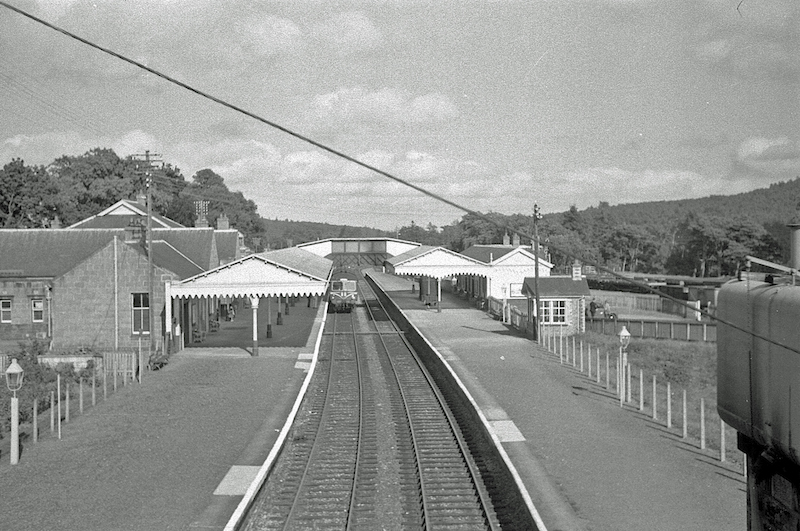
Banchory railway station on the Deeside Railway, Scotland, in 1961. The station closed in 1966.

After growing rapidly in the 19th century during the Railway Mania, the British railway system reached its height in the years immediately before the First World War, with a network of 23,440 miles (37,720 km). The network had opened up major travel opportunities for the entire country that had never been available before. However, lines were sometimes uneconomic, and several Members of Parliament had direct involvement with railways, creating a conflict of interest. In 1909, Winston Churchill, then President of the Board of Trade, argued that the country's railways did not have a future without rationalisation and amalgamation. By 1914, the railways had some significant problems, such as a lack of standard rolling stock and too many duplicated routes.

After the war, the railways faced increasing competition from a growing road transport network, which had increased to 8 million tons of freight annually by 1921. Around 1,300 miles (2,100 km) of passenger railways closed between 1923 and 1939. These closures included the Charnwood Forest Railway, closed to passengers in 1931, and the Harborne Line in Birmingham, closed to passengers in 1934. Some lines had never been profitable and were not subject to loss of traffic in that period. The railways were busy during the Second World War, but at the end of the war they were in a poor state of repair and in 1948 nationalised as British Railways.

The Branch Lines Committee of the British Transport Commission (BTC) was formed in 1949 with a brief to close the least-used branch lines. This resulted in the loss (or conversion to freight-only operation) of some 3,318 miles (5,340 km) of railway between 1948 and 1962. The most significant closure was that of the former Midland and Great Northern Joint Railway in 1959. In opposition to these cuts, the period also witnessed the beginning of a protest movement led by the Railway Development Association, whose most famous member was the poet John Betjeman. They went on to be a significant force resisting the Beeching proposals.

Economic recovery and the end of petrol rationing in 1950 led to rapid growth in car ownership and use. Vehicle mileage grew at a sustained annual rate of 10% between 1948 and 1964. In contrast, railway traffic remained steady during the 1950s but the economic situation steadily deteriorated, with labour costs rising faster than income and fares and freight charges repeatedly frozen by the government to try to control inflation. By 1955, the railways' share of the transport market had dropped from 16% to 5%.

The 1955 Modernisation Plan promised expenditure of over £1,240 million; steam locomotives would be replaced with diesel and electric locomotives, traffic levels would increase, and the system was predicted to be back in profit by 1962. Instead losses mounted, from £68 million in 1960 to £87 million in 1961, and £104 million in 1962 (£1.94 billion in 2025 terms). The BTC could no longer pay the interest on its loans.

By 1961, losses were running at £300,000 a day, despite the fact that since nationalisation in 1948, 3,000 miles (4,800 km) of line had been closed, railway staff numbers had fallen 26% from 648,000 to 474,000, and the number of railway wagons had fallen 29% from 1,200,000 to 848,000.

== The Beeching reports ==
=== The Reshaping of British Railways (Beeching I) ===
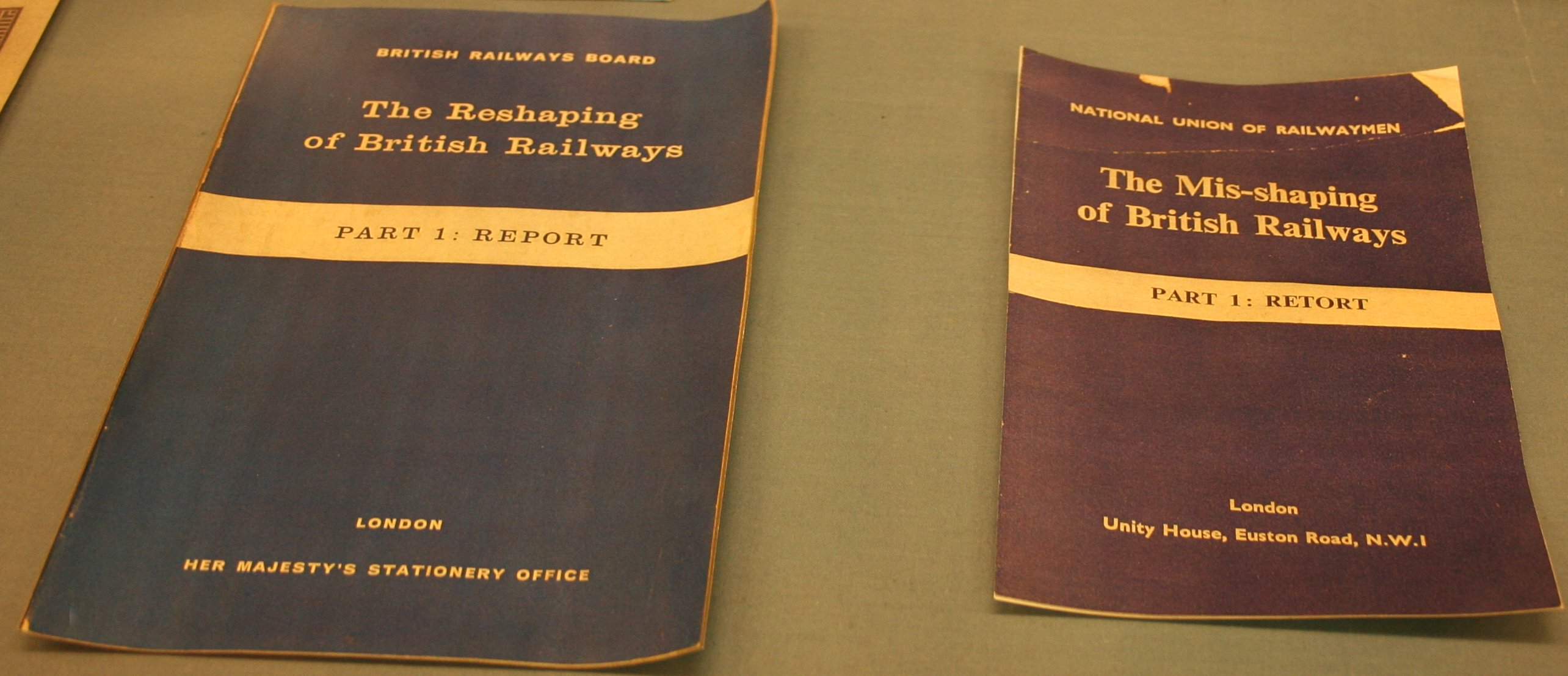
A copy of The Reshaping of British Railways report, displayed beside the National Union of Railwaymen's response pamphlet

The first Beeching report, titled The Reshaping of British Railways, was published on 27 March 1963.

The report starts by quoting the brief provided by the Prime Minister, Harold Macmillan, from 1960: "First, the industry must be of a size and pattern suited to modern conditions and prospects. In particular, the railway system must be modelled to meet current needs, and the modernisation plan must be adapted to this new shape" and with the premise that the railways should be run as a profitable business.

Beeching first studied traffic flows on all lines to identify "the good, the bad, and the indifferent". His analysis showed that the least-used 1,762 stations had annual passenger receipts of less than £2,500 each (£50,000 as of 2025), that over half of the 4,300 stations open to passengers in 1960 had receipts of less than £10,000, that the least-used 50% of stations contributed only 2% of passenger revenue, and that one third of route miles carried just 1% of passengers.

By way of example, he noted that the line from Thetford to Swaffham carried five trains each weekday in each direction, carrying an average of nine passengers with only 10% of the costs of operating the line covered by fares; another example was the Gleneagles-Crieff-Comrie line which had ten trains a day and five passengers on average, earning only 25% of costs. Finally there was the service from Hull to York via Beverley (using part of the Yorkshire Coast Line, which was not closed, and the York to Beverley Line, which was). The line covered 80% of its operating costs, but he calculated that it could be closed because there was an alternative, albeit less direct, route.

Out of 18,000 miles (29,000 km) of railway, Beeching recommended that 6,000 miles (9,700 km)—mostly rural and industrial lines—should be closed entirely, and that some of the remaining lines should be kept open only for freight. A total of 2,363 stations were to close, including 435 already under threat, both on lines that were to close and on lines that were to remain open.

He recommended that freight services should mainly be for bulk commodities such as minerals and coal, and that the freight system make use of new containerised handling systems rather than less efficient and slower wagon-load traffic. The latter recommendation would prove prescient with the rise of intermodal freight transport in the following decades.

=== The Development of the Major Railway Trunk Routes (Beeching II) ===
A map of Great Britain, showing "major lines" identified by Beeching II in bold.

On 16 February 1965, Beeching introduced the second stage of his reorganisation of the railways. In his report, The Development of the Major Railway Trunk Routes, he set out his conclusion that of the 7,500 miles (12,100 km) of trunk railway only 3,000 miles (4,800 km) "should be selected for future development" and invested in.

This policy would result in long-distance traffic being routed along nine lines. Traffic to Coventry, Birmingham, Manchester, Liverpool and Scotland would be routed through the West Coast Main Line to Carlisle and Glasgow; traffic to the north-east of England would be concentrated through the East Coast Main Line as far as Newcastle; and traffic to Wales and the West Country would go on the Great Western Main Line to Swansea and Plymouth.

Underpinning Beeching's proposals was his belief that there was too much duplication in the railway network: "The real choice is between an excessive and increasingly un-economic system, with a corresponding tendency for the railways as a whole to fall into disrepute and decay, or the selective development and intensive utilisation of a more limited trunk route system". Of the 7,500 miles (12,100 km) of trunk route, 3,700 miles (6,000 km) involves a choice between two routes, 700 miles (1,100 km) a choice of three, and over a further 700 miles (1,100 km) a choice of four. In Scotland, only the Central Belt routes and the lines via Fife and Perth to Aberdeen were selected for development, and none were selected in Wales, apart from the Great Western Main Line as far as Swansea.

Beeching's secondment from ICI ended early in June 1965 after Harold Wilson's attempt to get him to produce a transport plan failed. It is a matter of debate whether Beeching left by mutual arrangement with the government or if he was sacked. Frank Cousins, the Labour Minister of Technology, told the House of Commons in November 1965 that Beeching had been dismissed by Tom Fraser, the then Minister of Transport. Beeching denied this, pointing out that he had returned early to ICI as he would not have had enough time to undertake an in-depth transport study before the formal end of his secondment.

== The closures ==
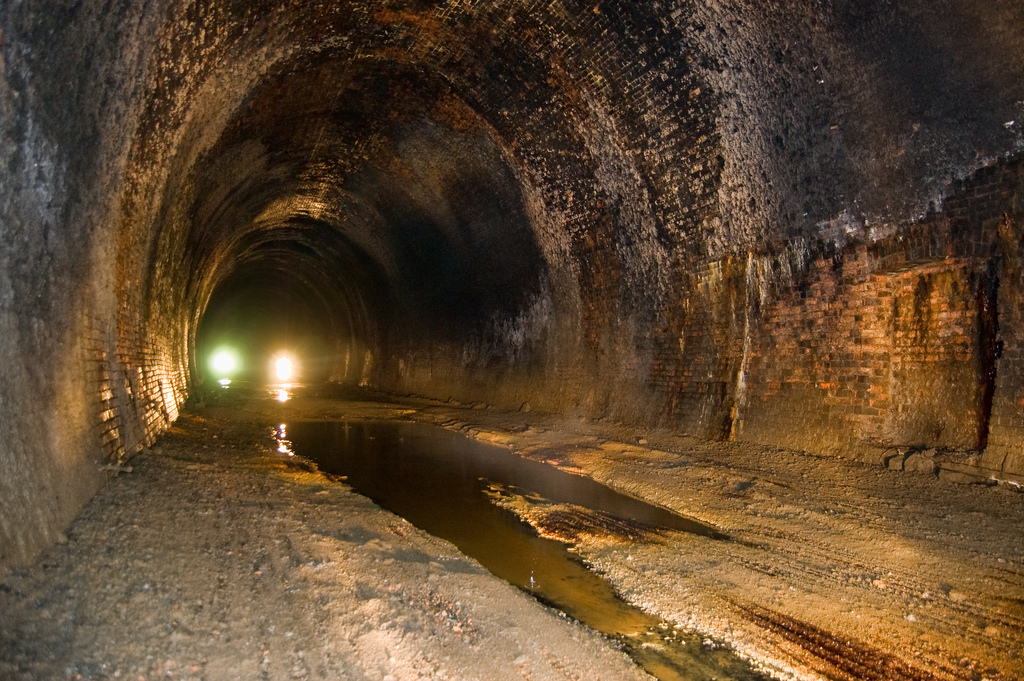
Prospect Tunnel lay on the Harrogate–Church Fenton line, one of the first lines to be closed

The first report was accepted by the Conservative government of the day, which argued that many services could be provided more effectively by buses. Most recommendations were subsequently taken forward by the Labour government elected in 1964, but many of the proposed closures sparked protests from communities that would lose their trains, a number of which (especially rural communities) had no other public transport.

Line closures had been running at about 150 to 300 miles (240 to 480 km) per year between 1950 and 1961. They peaked at 1,000 miles (1,600 km) in 1964 and came to a virtual halt by the early 1970s. One of the last major closures was the 98-mile (158 km) Waverley Route between Carlisle, Hawick and Edinburgh in 1969; the reopening of a 35-mile (56 km) section of this line was approved in 2006 and passenger services resumed in September 2015.

Holiday and coastal resorts were severely affected by the closures. The report recommended closing almost all services along the coasts of north Devon, Cornwall and East Anglia aside from Norwich to Great Yarmouth. All remaining services on the Isle of Wight were recommended for closure, as were all branch lines in the Lake District. One of the most significant closures was the Great Central Main Line from London Marylebone to Leicester and Sheffield.

Not all the recommended closures were implemented. Reprieved lines include:

- Lines through the Scottish Highlands, such as the Far North Line, were kept open, in part because of pressure from the powerful Highland lobby.
- The Central Wales Line was said to have been kept open because it passed through so many marginal constituencies that no-one dared to close it.
- The Tamar Valley Line, between Gunnislake and Plymouth, was kept open because the local road network was poor, with no direct route from the towns served to Plymouth.
- The Marshlink line between Ashford and Hastings remained open because of problems running a replacement bus service with the existing network.
- Other routes (or parts of routes) planned for closure that survived include the Settle-Carlisle line, Ipswich–Lowestoft, the Hope Valley Line, the Buxton line, the Avocet line, Ayr–Stranraer, Glasgow–Kilmarnock, Glasgow–Edinburgh via Shotts, Barrow–Whitehaven, Middlesbrough–Whitby, York–Harrogate, Leeds/Bradford–Ilkley, Nottingham–Lincoln, Boston–Skegness, Birkenhead–Wrexham, Liverpool–Southport (and other Merseyside commuter routes), Bury-Manchester, Leicester–Peterborough, St Erth–St Ives, and Ryde–Shanklin.

The Beeching Report was intended to be the first stage in the rail network's contraction. As a result, some lines it had not recommended for closure were subsequently shut down, such as the Woodhead line between Manchester and Sheffield in 1981, after the decline of the freight traffic (mostly coal) on which it had relied. Many surviving lines were rationalised, including reduction to single track and consolidation of signals. Most of the Oxford–Cambridge Varsity Line closed despite its strategic location serving Milton Keynes, Britain's largest "new town". Kinross-shire, and Fife especially, suffered closures not included in the Report, including the main line from Edinburgh to Perth. King's Lynn was to have remained at the centre of routes towards Norwich, Hunstanton and Wisbech, all of which closed.

With a few exceptions, after the early 1970s proposals to close other lines were met with vociferous public opposition and were shelved.

== Critical analysis ==
=== Disposals of land and structures ===
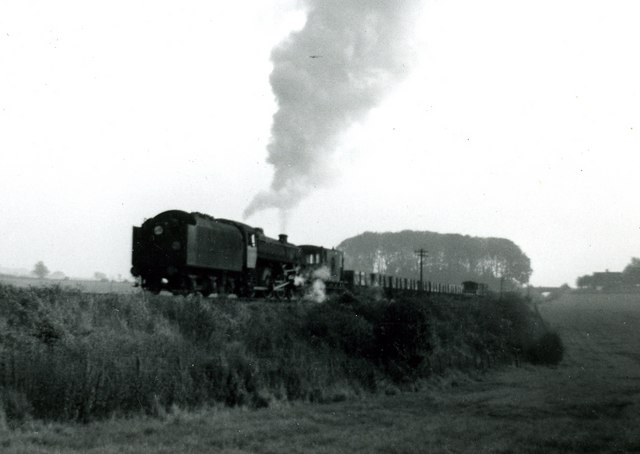
A demolition train during the dismantling of the Salisbury and Dorset Line in 1965

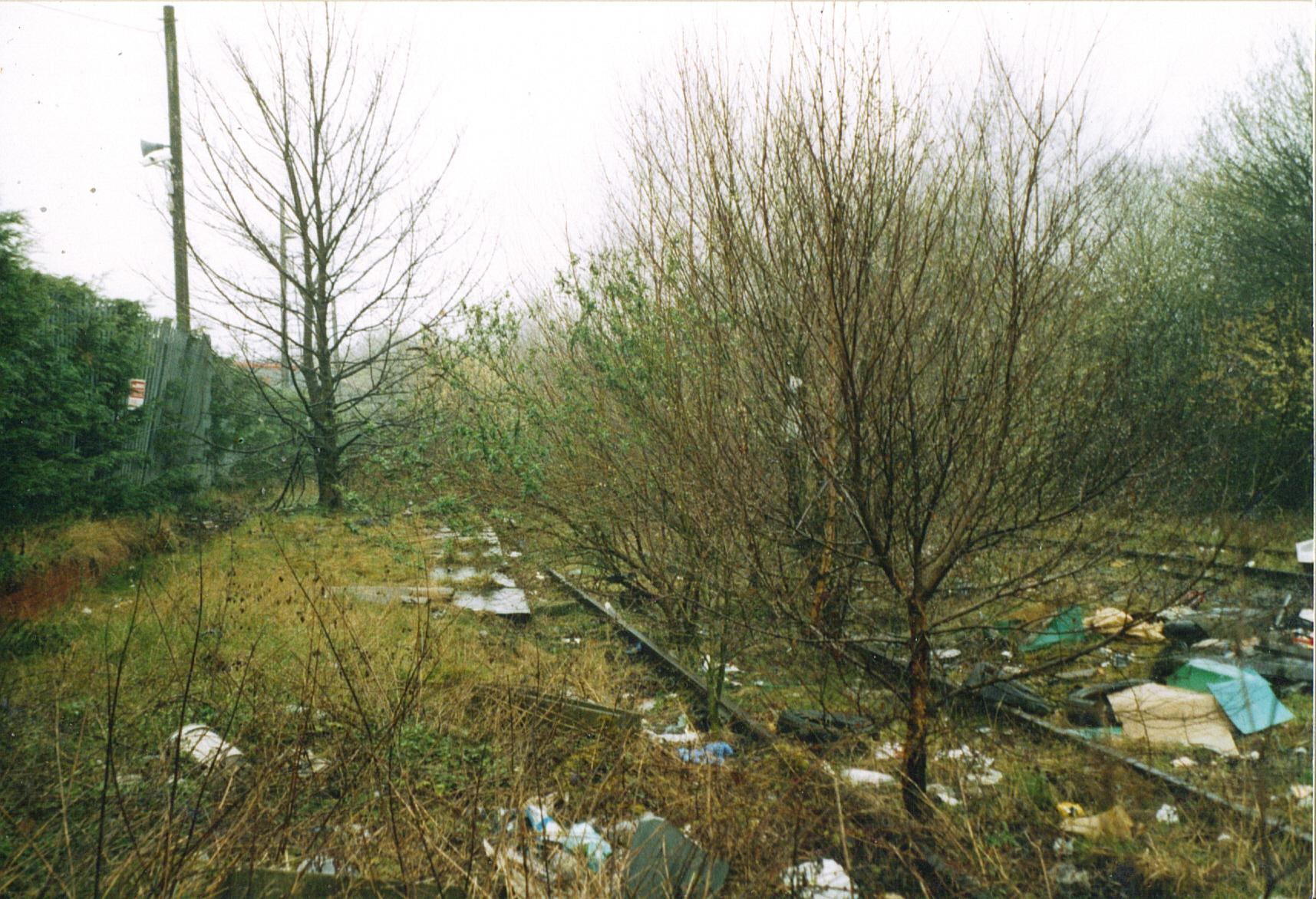
Both Wednesbury Town railway station and the South Staffordshire Railway were closed, and were still in ruins in 2003.

Beeching's reports made no recommendations about the handling of land after closures. British Rail operated a policy of disposing of land that was surplus to requirements. Many bridges, cuttings and embankments have been removed and the land sold for development. Closed station buildings on remaining lines have often been demolished or sold for housing or other purposes. Increasing pressure on land use meant that protection of closed trackbeds, as in other countries, such as the US Rail Bank scheme, which holds former railway land for possible future use, was not seen to be practical.

Many redundant structures from closed lines remain, such as bridges over other lines and drainage culverts. They often require maintenance as part of the rail infrastructure while providing no benefit. Critics of Beeching argue that the lack of recommendations on the handling of closed railway property demonstrates that the report was short-sighted. On the other hand, retaining a railway on these routes, which would obviously have increased maintenance costs, might not have earned enough to justify that greater cost. As demand for rail has grown since the 1990s, the failure to preserve the routes of closed lines, such as the one between Bedford and Cambridge, which was closed despite Beeching recommending its retention, has been criticised.

=== Acceptance of rail subsidies ===
By 1968, the railways were still losing money and Beeching's approach appeared to many to have failed. It has been suggested that by closing almost a third of the network Beeching achieved a saving of just £30 million, whilst overall losses were running in excess of £100 million per year. However, the precise savings from closures are impossible to calculate. The Ministry of Transport subsequently estimated that rail operating costs had been cut by over £100 million in the wake of the Beeching Report, but that much of this had been swallowed up by increased wages. Some of the branches closed acted as feeders to the main lines, and that feeder traffic was lost when the branches closed; the financial significance of this is debatable, for over 90% of the railways' 1960 traffic was carried on lines which remained open ten years later.

Whatever the figures, towards the end of the 1960s it became increasingly clear that rail closures were not bringing the rail system out of deficit and were unlikely ever to do so. Transport minister Barbara Castle decided that some rail services, which could not pay their way but had a valuable social role, should be subsidised. Legislation allowing this was introduced in the Transport Act 1968. Section 39 made provision for a subsidy to be paid by the Treasury for a three-year period. This was later repealed in the Railways Act 1974. Whether these subsidies affected the size of the network is questionable: the criteria for reprieving loss-making lines had not altered, merely the way their costs appeared in the railways' accounts—previously their contribution to the railways' overall loss was hidden in the total deficit.

=== Replacement buses and proposed alternatives ===
The "bustitution" policy that replaced rail services with buses also failed. In many cases, the replacement bus services were slower and less convenient than the trains they were meant to replace, and so were unpopular. Replacement bus services were often run between the (now disused) station sites (some of which were some distance from the population centres they served), thus losing any potential advantage over the closed rail service. Most replacement bus services lasted less than two years before they were removed due to a lack of patronage, leaving large parts of the country with no public transport.

The assumption at the time was that car owners would drive to the nearest railhead (which was usually the junction where the closed branch line would otherwise have taken them) and continue their journey onwards by train. In practice, having left home in their cars, people used them for the whole of their journey. Similarly, for freight, without branch lines, the railways' ability to transport goods "door to door" was dramatically reduced. As in the passenger model, it was assumed that lorries would pick up goods and transport them to the nearest railhead, where they would be taken across the country by train, unloaded onto another lorry and taken to their destination. The development of the motorway network, the advent of containerisation, improvements in lorries and the economic costs of having two break-bulk points combined to make long-distance road transport a more viable alternative.

Many of the closed lines had run at only a small deficit. Some lines such as the Sunderland-to-West Hartlepool line cost only £291 per mile to operate. Closures of such small-scale loss-making lines made little difference to the overall deficit.

Possible conversions to cheaper light railway-type operations were attacked by Beeching, who rejected all proposals for cost savings that would not make a route profitable: "Similarly, consideration of the cost figures will show that thinning out the trains, or thinning out the stations, would not make a service self-supporting even if it had no adverse effect on revenue". There is little in the Beeching report recommending general economies (in administration costs, working practices and so on). For example, a number of the stations that were closed were fully staffed 18 hours a day, on lines controlled by multiple Victorian era signalboxes (again fully staffed, often throughout the day). Operating costs could have been reduced by reducing staff and removing redundant services on these lines while keeping the stations open. This has since been successfully achieved by British Rail and its successors on lesser-used lines that survived the cuts, such as the East Suffolk Line from Ipswich to Lowestoft, which survives as a "basic railway".

The Marshlink line between Ashford International and Hastings, threatened with closure in the Beeching Report, is now seen as important due to the opening of the Channel Tunnel and High Speed 1. Traffic on the single-track Golden Valley Line between Kemble and Swindon and the Cotswold Line between Oxford and Worcester has increased significantly, and double track has now been reinstated on the Golden Valley Line, partly to facilitate a diversionary route during electrification and other works on the Severn tunnel line.

=== The people and the politics ===
The Conservatives increased their Commons majority in the general election of 8 October 1959, their first with Harold Macmillan as Prime Minister. Ernest Marples, previously Postmaster General, was made Transport Minister two weeks later in a cabinet reshuffle; Macmillan noted that the Northern working-class boy who had won a scholarship to a grammar school was one of only two "self-made men" in his cabinet.

Marples had a background with a successful road construction company. When opening the M1 motorway, he said: "This motorway starts a new era in road travel. It is in keeping with the bold scientific age in which we live. It is a powerful weapon to add to our transport system." His association with the high-profile construction company Marples Ridgway became a matter of concern to both the public and politicians. As is customary, he resigned as a director of the company in 1951 on becoming a junior minister, but he only disposed of his shares in the company in 1960 after the company won a contract to build the Hammersmith Flyover, when questions were asked both in the media and also in the Commons on 28 January 1960; he made a statement to the House later that day confirming that the sale of shares was in hand and would be completed "very soon", noting that as part of the agreement he could be required to buy the shares from the purchaser at the original price after he ceased to hold office, if so desired by the purchaser. While it was reported that he sold the shares to his wife, she denied in a newspaper interview, that any transaction had taken place. It was reported that he had transferred his shares into an Overseas Trust. In July 1964, Marples Ridgway and Partners Limited were awarded a £4.1 million contract for the "Hendon Urban Motorway" extension of the M1, in the same year that the company was taken over by the Bath and Portland Group. There was no evidence of any wrongdoing on anyone's part in this or any of the other contracts awarded to the company during his term of office, but it did lead to a sense of unease, not least within the railway sector.

In April 1960, Sir Ivan Stedeford established an advisory group known as the Stedeford Committee at the request of Harold Macmillan to report on the state of the British Transport Commission and to make recommendations. Sir Ewart Smith, a retired former Chief Engineer at Imperial Chemical Industries (ICI), was asked by Ernest Marples to become a member of an advisory group; Smith declined but recommended Richard Beeching in his place, a suggestion that Marples accepted. Beeching, who held a PhD in physics, had been appointed to the main board of ICI at the age of 43. The board consisted of senior figures in British businesses, and none of the board had previous knowledge or experience of the railway industry. Stedeford and Beeching clashed on a number of issues, but the future size of the railway system was not one of them. For all the suspicion it aroused, the committee had little to say on this and the government was already convinced of the need to reduce the size of the rail network. In spite of questions being asked in Parliament, Stedeford's report was not published at the time. In December 1960, questions were asked in the Lords about this "secret" and "under-the-counter" study group, criticising the continued withholding of the report and its recommendations. It was later suggested that Stedeford had recommended that the government should set up another body "to consider the size and pattern of the railway system required to meet current and foreseeable needs, in the light of developments and trends in other forms of transport ... and other relevant considerations".

Marples then appointed Beeching as Chairman of the British Transport Commission in March 1961. He would receive the same yearly salary that he was earning at ICI, the controversial sum of £24,000 (£466,000 in 2025 terms), £10,000 more than Sir Brian Robertson, the previous chairman of the BTC, £14,000 more than Prime Minister Harold Macmillan, and two-and-a-half times higher than the salary of any head of a nationalised industry at the time. At that time the government was seeking outside talent to sort out the huge problems of the railway network, and he was confident that he could make the railways pay for themselves, but his salary, at 35 times that of many railway workers, has been described as a "political disaster".

The Transport Act 1962 dissolved the British Transport Commission (BTC), which had overseen the railways, canals and road freight transport and established the British Railways Board, which took over on 1 January 1963, with Dr Beeching as its first chairman. The Act put in place measures that simplified the process of closing railways by removing the need for the pros and cons of each case to be heard in detail. It was described as the "most momentous piece of legislation in the field of railway law to have been enacted since the Railway and Canal Traffic Act 1854".

The general election in October 1964 returned a Labour government under Prime Minister Harold Wilson after 13 years of Conservative government. During the election campaign Labour had promised to halt rail closures if elected, but it quickly backtracked, and later oversaw some of the most controversial closures. Tom Fraser was appointed Minister of Transport, but was replaced by Barbara Castle in December 1965. Castle published a map in 1967, Network for Development, showing the railway system "stabilised" at around 11,000 route miles (17,700 km).

Section 39 of the Transport Act 1968 made provision for grants to be paid in relation to loss-making lines and services, but many of the services and railway lines that would have qualified had already been closed. A number of branch lines and local services were saved by this legislation.

After 1970, when the Conservatives were returned to power, serious thought was given to a further programme of closures, but this proved politically impossible. In 1982, under the government of Margaret Thatcher, Sir David Serpell, a civil servant who had worked with Beeching, compiled the Serpell Report which said that a profitable railway could be achieved only by closing much of what remained. The report's infamous "Option A" proposed greatly increasing fares and reducing the rail network to a mere 1,630 miles (2,620 km), leaving only 22 miles (35 km) of railway in Wales (a section of the South Wales Main Line from the Severn Tunnel to Cardiff Central) and none in Somerset, Devon or Cornwall. The Midland Main Line was planned to close, leaving Leicester and Derby without a rail link, while the East Coast Main Line, part of the key London/Edinburgh link, was intended to be cut north of Newcastle. The report was published on 20 January 1983 and received an immediate backlash from the media. It was quietly shelved in the run up to the 1983 election.

Ian Hislop comments that history has been somewhat unkind to "Britain's most hated civil servant", by forgetting that Beeching proposed a much better bus service that ministers never delivered, and that in some ways he was used to do their "dirty work for them". Hislop describes him as "a technocrat [who] wasn't open to argument to romantic notions of rural England or the warp and weft of the train in our national identity. He didn't buy any of that. He went for a straightforward profit and loss approach and some claim we are still reeling from that today". Beeching was unrepentant about his role in the closures: "I suppose I'll always be looked upon as the axe man, but it was surgery, not mad chopping".

On 7 June 2019, former Minister for Transport Andrew Adonis delivered a speech on "Reversing Beeching".

== Reopenings ==
Rail share of passenger transport (1952–2023)

Rail passengers in Great Britain 1829–2025

Since the Beeching cuts, road traffic levels have grown significantly. As well, since privatisation in the mid-1990s, there have been record levels of passengers on the railways owing to a preference to living in smaller towns and rural areas, and in turn commuting longer distances (although the cause of this is disputed). A few of the railway closures have been reversed. However, despite the considerable increase in railway journeys since the mid-1990s, rail transport's share of the total passenger transport market remains below that of the early 1960s, with road overwhelmingly the dominant mode: rail's market share was 13% in 1961, 6% in 1991 and 2001, and 10% in 2014.

Some closed stations have reopened, and passenger services have been restored on a few lines where they had been removed.

=== Heritage railways ===
Some lines closed under the Beeching cuts have reopened as private heritage railways. Some examples are East Lancs Railway, Great Central Railway (heritage railway), Mid Hants Railway, North Yorkshire Moors Railway, North Norfolk Railway and West Somerset Railway.

== In popular culture ==
Flanders and Swann, writers and performers of satirical songs, wrote a lament for lines closed by the Beeching cuts entitled "Slow Train" (1963). Michael Williams' book On the slow train takes its name from the Flanders and Swann song. It celebrates 12 of the most beautiful and historic journeys in Britain, some of which were saved from the Beeching cuts. It perpetuated the myth that the Beeching cuts were concerned solely with sleepy rural branch lines, but they actually also concerned well-used "industrial" and commuter lines.

The BBC TV comedy series Oh, Doctor Beeching!, broadcast from 1995 to 1997, was set at a small fictional branch-line railway station threatened with closure under the Beeching cuts.

In the satirical magazine Private Eye, the "Signal Failures" column on railway issues is written under the pseudonym "Dr. B. Ching".

The lyrics of the I Like Trains song "The Beeching Report" criticise Dr Beeching and the Beeching cuts.

The term "Celiński Axe" (Polish: Siekiery Celińskiego) was coined from Beeching Axe when Krzysztof Celiński, who was at the time the director of Polish State Railways, made the decision to close over 639 miles (1,028 km) of railway lines in Poland, which took place on 3 April 2000. This was Poland's largest singular closure of railway lines to date.

== Closures by year ==
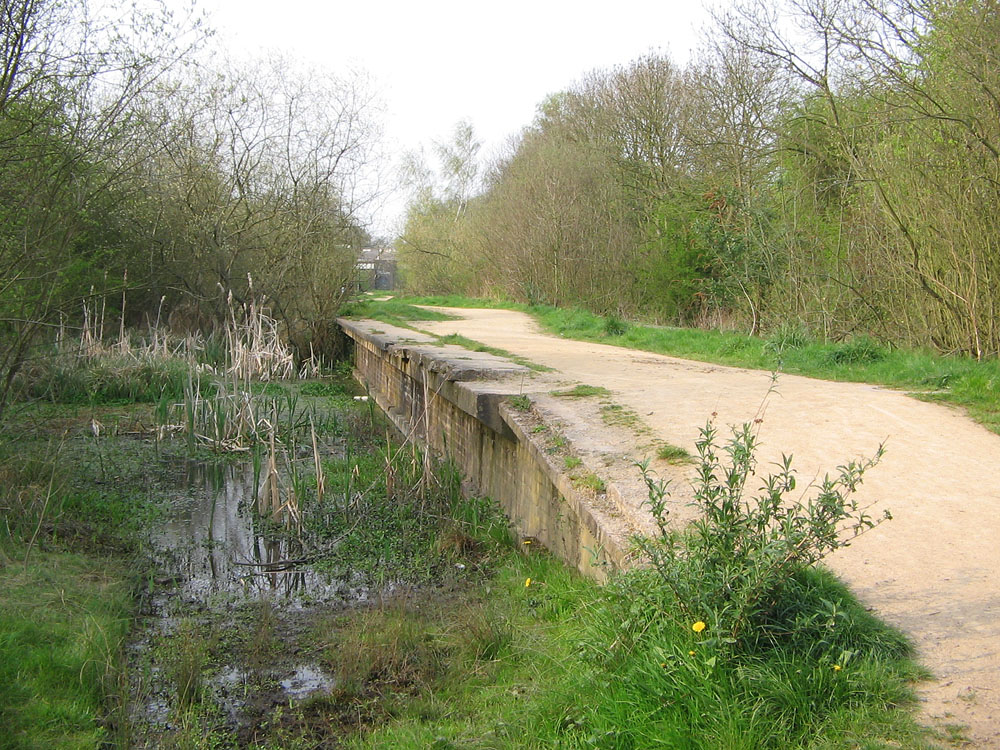
The remains of Rugby Central station on the former Great Central Railway

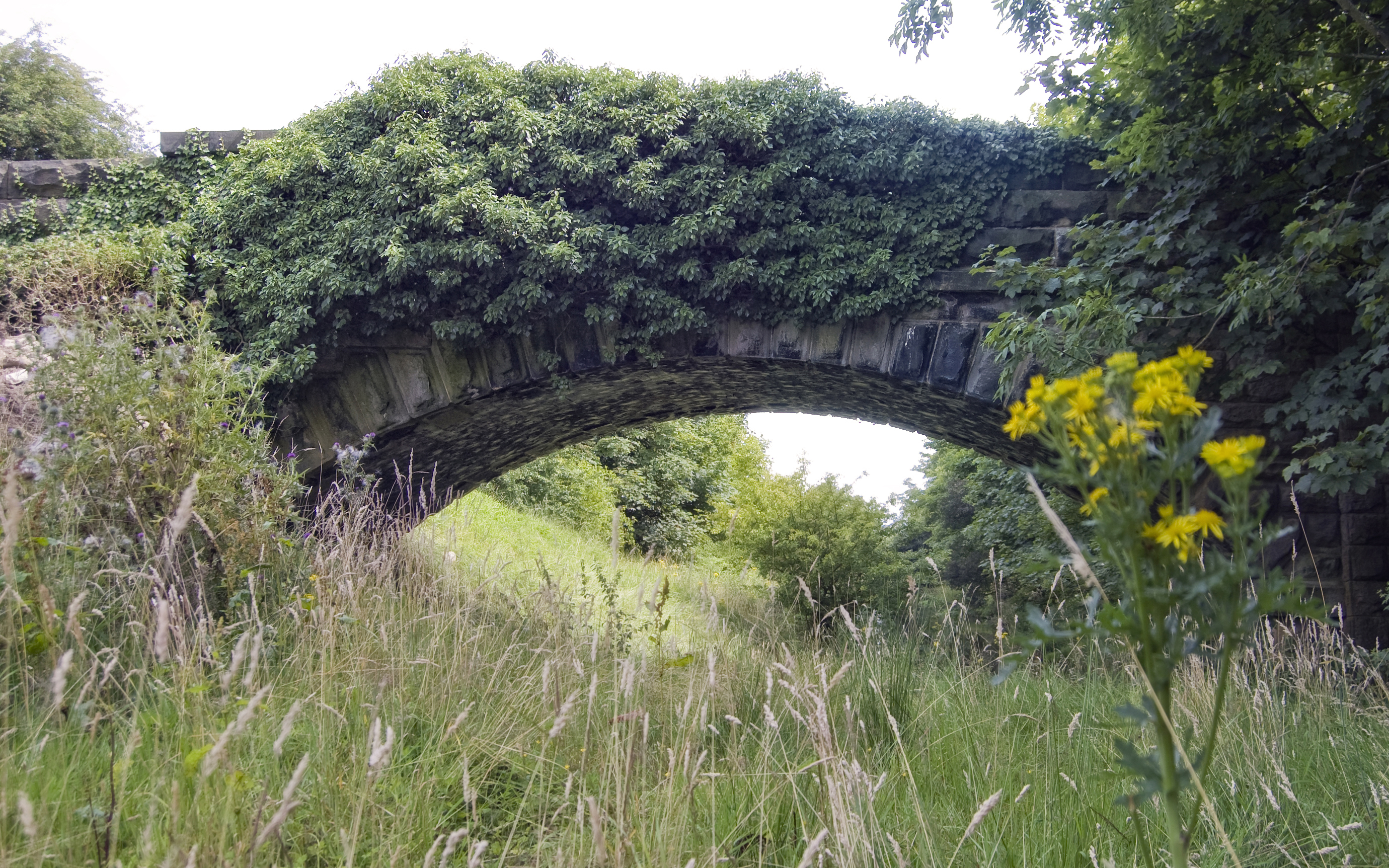
An abandoned stone bridge spans the route of the Otley and Ilkley Joint Railway through Otley, which was closed in 1965.

The list below shows over 7,000 miles (11,000 km) of closures:

Year	Total length closed
1950	150 miles (240 km)
1951	275 miles (443 km)
1952	300 miles (480 km)
1953	275 miles (443 km)
1954 to 1957	500 miles (800 km)
1958	150 miles (240 km)
1959	350 miles (560 km)
1960	175 miles (282 km)
1961	150 miles (240 km)
1962	780 miles (1,260 km)
Beeching report published
1963	324 miles (521 km)
1964	1,058 miles (1,703 km)
1965	600 miles (970 km)
1966	750 miles (1,210 km)
1967	300 miles (480 km)
1968	400 miles (640 km)
1969	250 miles (400 km)
1970	275 miles (443 km)
1971	23 miles (37 km)
1972	50 miles (80 km)
1973	35 miles (56 km)

After this period, "residual" Beeching closures took place: Bridport to Maiden Newton in 1975, Alston to Haltwhistle in 1976, and Woodside to Selsdon in 1983.

== See also ==
- List of closed railway stations in Great Britain
- List of closed railway lines in the United Kingdom
- List of heritage railway stations in the United Kingdom
- Serpell Report, similar 1982 report on British Rail
- Specified local lines, similar legislation undertaken in Japan
