= Patrick Collins =

Patrick Collins may refer to:

- Paddy Collins (1903–1995), Irish sportsman
- Paddy Collins (referee) (born 1942), Irish Gaelic football referee and administrator
- Patrick K. Collins (born 1977), rugby union coach
- Patrick Collins (director), American pornographic film producer and director
- Patrick Collins (footballer) (born 1985), player from England
- Patrick Collins (politician) (1844–1905), U.S. Representative from Massachusetts and mayor of Boston
- Patrick Collins (painter) (1911–1994), Irish painter
- Patrick Collins (American football) (born 1966), American football player
- Patrick M. Collins (born 1964), American lawyer
- Patrick Collins (hurler) (born 1996), Irish hurler

== See also ==
- Pat Collins (disambiguation)
- Collins (surname)
