= Milos Stankovic =

- Born: Milosh Radomir Vladimir Stankovic; December 1962 (age 63); Southern Rhodesia
- Military career
- Allegiance: United Kingdom
- Branch: British Army
- Service years: 1981–2000
- Rank: Major
- Service number: 515785
- Unit: Parachute Regiment
- Awards: Member of the Order of the British Empire
- Website: wilywords.com (defunct)

Milosh Radomir Vladimir Stankovic MBE (born December 1962) is a former British Army officer and author of the Bosnian war memoire Trusted Mole.

== Early years ==
Stankovic was born in Southern Rhodesia. His father, a naturalised British, was a Royalist Yugoslav during World War II. His mother was British and served with the Eighth Army at the battle of El Alamein in Egypt 1942–43, Italy 1944 and in Yugoslavia in 1945. The family returned to London from Rhodesia in 1963. Stankovic was educated at Plymouth College in Devon, England, where he studied classics and was head of school and head of the Combined Cadet Force.

== Military service ==
He joined the Parachute Regiment in 1981, went to Royal Military Academy Sandhurst in 1982 and was sent to university by the Army to study Russian at Manchester University and at the Minsk State Pedagogical Institute for Foreign Languages in the Soviet Union. He completed the Standard Graduate Course at Sandhurst in 1986 and subsequently served with the British Army in Belize, Northern Ireland and Southern Africa, and with the United Nations forces in Kuwait, Iraq and Bosnia. A fluent speaker of Serbo-Croatian and Russian, he specialised in psychological operations and post-Cold War arms control. He retired from the British Army in 2000 with the rank of major.

=== Bosnian War ===
Operating primarily as a liaison officer under the pseudonym 'Mike Stanley', he was the longest-serving British soldier with the United Nations Protection Force during the 1992–95 Bosnian War. In the latter part of his service, he worked directly for General Sir Michael Rose and General Sir Rupert Smith, successive commanders of the United Nations Protection Force in Bosnia in 1994 and 1995. His functions mainly involved mediating, negotiating and troubleshooting ceasefires, hostage releases, and the 1995 Cessation of Hostilities Agreement with Bosnian Serb political and military leaders. Upon his return from Bosnia, Stankovic was appointed Member of the Order of the British Empire for his mediation work.

Your liaison function in particular between BH Command and Pale was wholly indispensable to the peace process, and I always felt that I knew better than my predecessors the innermost thoughts of the Serbs...it was essential that we had someone who could gain their trust and demonstrate that as peacekeepers we really were impartial. All this came to a culminating point during the cessation of hostilities negotiations when you provided the 'telephone through the window!' Without this I doubt we would have got the necessary signatures.

— General Sir Michael Rose, Adjutant-General

Major Stankovic has been mine and my predecessor's Liaison Officer with the Bosnian Serb Army since June 1994. He has worked for me for the past four months. The relationships he has established with key figures, not least the Bosnian Serb Army commander, his knowledge of the language and the background to the war has been invaluable...He has been under considerable pressure, operating alone in isolated circumstances where the threat of hostile activity is ever present and occasionally occurs. Major Stankovic has performed excellently. His mediation between the warring factions, his representation of me and his advice have all been of critical importance...As a character he is brave and enduring. He is calm and thoughtful under pressure. He is his own man walking his own path.

— General Sir Rupert Smith, Deputy Supreme Allied Commander Europe

I have no doubts whatsoever. In Bosnia he played an absolute blinder.

— General Sir Mike Jackson, Chief of the General Staff

=== Spy scandal ===
In October 1997, while at the Joint Services Command and Staff Course, Stankovic was arrested by the Ministry of Defence Police on suspicion of breaches under Section 2b of the Official Secrets Act 1911. Although he was on police bail for over a year, during which time the MOD Police interviewed several hundred witnesses, no evidence of any wrongdoing was found with which to charge him. In April 1999 the Crown Prosecution Service concluded that there would be no further action against him for lack of evidence. Nonetheless, for a subsequent year, he was investigated by the Royal Military Police's Special Investigations Branch to determine whether violations to the Military Services had been made. In March 2000, the Army concluded that no violations had been found. Meanwhile, Stankovic had resigned from the Army in order to pursue his case against the Ministry of Defence in the Civil Courts (see § Litigation below). The Army Board reflected the lack of substance of the allegations and the failure of two investigations to find any evidence of wrongdoing in an unusual letter to Major Stankovic that is not normally written to officers retiring from the Services:

On the occasion of your retirement from the Army, I am directed by the Army Board to thank you most sincerely for the loyal service you have given since you were commissioned. The Army Board recognises that, in carrying out your duties as an officer, you will have had to make many sacrifices, putting the interests of your Country, the Army and your soldiers before your own. This is very much appreciated and the Army Board wishes formally to express its gratitude for the service you have given and for the excellent contribution you have made.

— Major General Alistair Irvin, Military Secretary, 27 July 2000

== Litigation ==
In October 2007, ten years after his arrest, Stankovic's case against the Ministry of Defence Police finally came to trial in the Royal Courts of Justice. There were only three torts in law upon which he could rest his claim: Unlawful arrest; trespass to property; and malfeasance in public office (abuse of power) – a tort that had been heard only ten times previously in civil courts and had failed on seven of those occasions. Although the trial judge, Justice Saunders, found that the MOD Police had not abused their power during investigation and held reasonable grounds for suspicion leading to Stankovic's subsequent arrest, he did find that the trespass of Stankovic's property had been inordinate. Furthermore, the trial process revealed additional hitherto unseen disclosure, which finally named Stankovic's original accuser – a former British Army officer. In clearing Stankovic's name, The Honourable Mr Justice Saunders summed up as follows on 9 November 2007:

Looked at objectively, there is no doubt that what happened to the Claimant has been unfair and the consequences serious…he was an impressive and realistic witness. He did not overstate his case...He proved himself to be courageous and resourceful in Bosnia and suffered the effects of his time there more than most.

Mr Justice Saunders awarded £5,000 for the MOD Police "seizing and removing items outside the terms of a search warrant", but threw out the majority of Stankovic's case and made him liable for all costs (circa £500,000).

== Writing ==
On 14 April 2000, Stankovic published Trusted Mole, his own account of his experiences as a liaison officer, mediator and negotiator in the Bosnian War.

== Recent years ==
Having spent two and a half years in bail custody, Stankovic supports the Justice Delayed Justice Denied campaign to restrict police bail durations.

Since leaving the British Army, Stankovic has worked as a risk management consultant and in business intelligence in Russia. He has worked with CBS and BBC on protection measures for reporters in Iraq.
