= Trusted Mole =

2000 memoir by Milos Stankovic

- Author: Milos Stankovic
- Language: English
- Subject: Bosnian War
- Genre: Memoir
- Publisher: HarperCollins
- Publication date: 14 April 2000
- Publication place: United Kingdom
- Media type: Print (hardback, softback, e-book)
- Pages: 476
- ISBN: 0-00-257024-6
- Website: trustedmole.com (defunct)

Trusted Mole - A Soldier's Journey into Bosnia's Heart of Darkness is a military memoir by Milos Stankovic MBE, a British Army paratrooper of part Scottish and part Serbian blood, who was Britain's longest serving soldier in the Bosnian War of 1992-95. It relates his first-hand experiences of troubleshooting, mediating and negotiating on behalf of the United Nations Protection Force during the Bosnian War. On publication in April 2000 it was described by the Sunday Times as, "By far the best book to have come out of the Balkan Wars".

== Publications ==
- Hardback (2000), ISBN 9780002570244, published by HarperCollins
- Paperback (2001), ISBN 9780006530909, published by HarperCollins
- E-book (2015), published by HarperCollins

== Background ==
By his own admission Stankovic's book and his experiences may never have seen the light of day but for the fact that he was arrested by the Ministry of Defence Police in October 1997 on suspicion of breaching the Official Secrets Act 1989 in respect of his activities in Bosnia some two years previously. At the time the arrest provoked major comment in the UK and international media and two adjournment debates in the House of Commons.

== Synopsis ==
"He was the outstanding liaison officer of his time. He did for Britain in the 1990s what Fitzroy MacLean had done in the 1940s, and in the same turbulent corner of Europe." Martin Bell OBE, veteran BBC war correspondent.

Trusted Mole is written in two parts covering each of the author's long deployments to Bosnia operating under the nom de guerre Mike Stanley. He was formally trained in psychological warfare and had been involved with the establishment of Britain's post-Cold War arms control organization. He had served in Africa training Communist FRELIMO troops for the Mozambiquan government in the late 1980s and had served with the UN in Iraq and Kuwait at the end of the Gulf War. All these experiences helped shape his understanding of the complexities of the wars in the Balkans.

Part One, Baby Blue, covers the years 1992 and 1993, during which he answered formally to two Commanders British Forces (COMBRITFOR) who were based in Divulje Barracks in Split: Brigadier Andrew Cumming and Brigadier Robin Searby. 'Stanley' was loaned out to the Cheshire's commander, Lieutenant Colonel Bob Stewart, whose battalion was based in Vitez in central Bosnia. During this time the author witnessed the bloodshed between Bosnian Muslims and Bosnian Croats whose common enemy was the Bosnian Serb faction. Stankovic became increasingly involved in looking after elderly people in the besieged city of Sarajevo, one on behalf of General Sir Mike Jackson. He was also involved in the supposed demilitarization of the Srebrenica pocket and early on identified the mortal danger the Muslim population were in. He was gagged and ordered to keep quiet about the precarious situation in Srebrenica. In the final five months of his first long tour in Bosnia 'Stanley' set up and ran an operation in Sarajevo that monitored, accounted for and reported the distribution of humanitarian aid given to the Bosnian Serb part of Sarajevo. In this respect he reported directly to the Head of the UN Department in the Foreign and Commonwealth Office in London. His time in Bosnia was characterised as a succession of high intensity mediation and negotiation activities, frequently conducted 'on the fly' in dangerous and difficult circumstances.

Part Two, The Mad Hatter's Tea Party, describes 'Mike Stanley's' second long tour in Bosnia which followed some six months after his first, from 1994 to 1995. This time he found himself on the staff of the Commander of the United Nations Protection Force in Bosnia. In 1994 this post was filled by a British general, Sir Michael Rose, who handed over command to another British general, Sir Rupert Smith. Although ostensibly working as the Commander's 'interpreter', he did little of it. By his own admission he lacked the computer-like brain necessary for simultaneous translation. He also lacked formal training as an interpreter. His usefulness to successive generals and others lay in his ability to gain access to the Bosnian Serb political and military leadership and, through a mixture of guerilla mediation and negotiation, troubleshoot on behalf of his various bosses: hostage release, body exchanges, freedom of movement and checkpoint negotiations, utilities, evacuation of wounded civilians, ceasefires and Cessation of Hostilities Negotiations. He was also involved in Schindler's List, a covert operation in which endangered civilians of all ethnic backgrounds were smuggled out of Sarajevo to be reunited with members of their families around the world. In performing these duties 'Stanley' became increasingly exposed to hostile media reports directed by the New York Times and Bosnian government media. Eventually, 'Stanley' became a marked man with a price on his head. His days in Sarajevo and Bosnia were numbered.

"Your liaison function in particular between BH Command and Pale was wholly indispensable to the peace process, and I always felt that I knew better than my predecessors the innermost thoughts of the Serbs…it was essential that we had someone who could gain their trust and demonstrate that as peacekeepers we really were impartial. All this came to a culminating point during the cessation of hostilities negotiations when you provided the ‘telephone through the window!’ Without this I doubt we would have got the necessary signatures." - General Sir Michael Rose KCB CBE DSO QGM, Adjutant General.

"Major Stankovic has been mine and my predecessor's Liaison Officer with the Bosnian Serb Army since June 1994. He has worked for me for the past four months. The relationships he has established with key figures, not least the Bosnian Serb Army commander, his knowledge of the language and the background to the war has been invaluable...He has been under considerable pressure, operating alone in isolated circumstances where the threat of hostile activity is ever present and occasionally occurs. Major Stankovic has performed excellently. His mediation between the warring factions, his representation of me and his advice have all been of critical importance." - General Sir Rupert Smith KCB DSO OBE QGM, Deputy Supreme Allied Commander in Europe.

"I have no doubts whatsoever. In Bosnia he played an absolute blinder." -General Sir Mike Jackson KCB CBE DSO DL, Chief of the General Staff.

On his return to the United Kingdom he was appointed Member of the Order of the British Empire at an investiture conducted by Her Majesty The Queen at Buckingham Palace in July 1995 for his mediation and negotiation work in Bosnia.

Twenty-four months later he was arrested for the same.

== Film ==
In 2005 the author was approached by the actor James Cromwell with a view to a film adaptation of Trusted Mole. They met in Beverley Hills in August 2005 to discuss the project, and then subsequently in London later that year. Cromwell understood that the underlying theme in Trusted Mole was that of identity and set up Koshari Films as the production vehicle for the project. He approached George Clooney to direct. Clooney considered the project but decided against it on the basis that it was too similar to his geopolitical thriller Syriana, which had gone to the box office that same year. The project stalled at that point.

== Reviews ==
The US Kirkus Review of Books. "Stankovic does a terrific job of clarifying the testosterone-driven conflict...Joseph Heller would have felt right at home in the murderous and absurd milieu."

Sunday Times. Peter Miller: "By far the best book to have come out of the Balkan wars, not because it explains the conflict simply, but because Stankovic demonstrates with wit and eloquence that simplicity was never part of the equation...It is not, however, a bleak book. Far from it. There is humour, lots of it, often (inevitably) black, but also reflecting the accidental idiocies and genuinely comic scenes that occurred in the midst of organised chaos."

Ulster News Letter. Lindsay Fergus: "Although initially prevented by the British Army from serving in the Balkans because of his ethnic roots, his knowledge of the language and culture eventually became his passport to that hellish theatre and to an unorthodox and dangerous role...He delved even deeper into the minds of the personalities involved. Drawing on local knowledge, body language and history, he constantly sought the key to unlocking problems as diverse as freedom of movement, food and water supplies and the exchange of dead bodies between warring factions...It is an amazing book which from the outset speaks plainly and directly of great events and intimate experiences. This is the story of one who has been exceedingly traumatised but it is written without embellishment, honestly and with considered reflection."

Martin Bell, OBE. "Milos Stankovic served longer in the Bosnian war than any other British soldier...He was the outstanding liaison officer of his time. He did for Britain in the 1990s what Fitzroy MacLean had done in the 1940s, and in the same turbulent corner of Europe...Trusted Mole is the best book yet written on the Bosnian war, certainly including my own. It is more than that. It is the most extraordinary soldier's story I have ever read."

Observer. John Sweeney: "Stankovic's book is far more than the outcry of an innocent man foully accused. He has a wonderful eye for detail and a natural storyteller's gift, and passion, to get across the bizarre and terrible cruelty of what the people of Bosnia went through. At times, I laughed out loud; at times, horrible moments of my spells there came swimming back, brilliantly evoked in Stankovic's fresh prose...Trusted Mole is rich in comic scenes...But the comedy switchbacks with the tragedy...this man was a hero, caught in the middle and discarded by a military bureaucracy that should be shot at dawn for its betrayal."

Literary Review. Mark Almond: "Now exculpated from all charges, Stankovic has written a remarkably frank account of his time in Bosnia...What Trusted Mole makes sickeningly clear is not just the absurdity of sending in peacekeepers with no peace to keep (and neither the weaponry nor the political backing to impose it), but also the corrupting effects of war and humanitarian aid on almost everybody involved."

Sunday Telegraph. Charlotte Eager: "This is a powerful book...the inside story, not only of the UN's war in Bosnia...but also, of what happens to someone who spends too long in a place populated by the dead and those whose hope has died."

Eastern Daily Press. James Ruddy: "Fascinating and truly exciting...As a window into that hidden period, his account is a revelation, littered with insights into ordinary human chaos which lay behind the apparently calm and collected statements of the politicians and the military top brass."

== Blurb ==
In a final, horrific twist, the author was arrested by the British Authorities on suspicion of being a Serb spy. At journey's end, Milos Stankovic was now confronted with the awful and inescapable truth of 'Mike Stanley'.
