= David Serpell =

British civil servant

Sir David Radford Serpell, KCB, CMG, OBE (10 November 1911 – 28 July 2008) was a British civil servant.

Born in Plymouth on 10 November 1911, Serpell was the son of a solicitor. He attended Plymouth College and Exeter College, Oxford, and then completed a diploma at the University of Toulouse. Following further studies at Syracuse University, he was a fellow at Tufts University. He joined HM Civil Service in 1937, moving to the Ministry of Food in 1939, the Ministry of Fuel and Power in 1942, and then HM Treasury in 1945. He became an under-secretary in 1954 and, on moving to the Ministry of Transport, became a deputy secretary in 1960 and oversaw inland transport. In 1963, he was appointed Second Secretary at the Board of Trade and was made its Second Permanent Secretary in 1966. In 1968, he was briefly Second Secretary at the Treasury, before he served as Permanent Secretary of the Ministry of Transport from 1968 to 1970, overseeing railway reforms and the implementation of the Transport Act 1968. When the ministry was merged into the Department for the Environment in 1970, he was appointed its Permanent Secretary, serving until 1972.

After leaving the civil service, he was on the board of British Rail (from 1974 to 1982) and then carried out his Review of Railway Finances, known as the Serpell Report and published in 1983. This was highly controversial, but many of his recommendations about operating and engineering would be implemented later in the 1980s. In the meantime, he had also chaired the Nature Conservancy Council (from 1973 to 1977) and served on the boards of several public bodies. He died on 28 July 2008.
