= Serpell Report =

Report on British railways in 1982

The Serpell Report was produced in 1982 by a committee chaired by Sir David Serpell, a retired senior civil servant. It was commissioned by the government of Margaret Thatcher to examine the state and long-term prospects of Great Britain's railway system. There were two main parts to the report. The first (and lengthier) part described in detail the state of British Rail's finances in 1982. The second looked at various options for a future (1992) rail network, and made comparisons between each option and the continuation of the existing network.

== Background ==
In many ways, 1982 represented the nadir of Britain's railways. That year saw the lowest number of passenger journeys of the second half of the 20th century, the lowest level of passenger-miles, and the lowest (real) level of passenger revenue since 1968. Although these figures were partly the result of the 1982 strike (over rostering arrangements), rail passenger numbers had been in steady decline since 1957. (Only 1978–1980 saw consecutive years of passenger growth.) In 1982 terms, revenues had decreased steadily from £2,300 million in 1970 to £1,800 million in 1982, while costs had risen from £2,500 million to £2,700 million. Consequently, BR's deficit had increased by 350%.

Serpell was chosen to chair the review into railway finances. His lengthy experience of the civil service included serving as Under-Secretary at the Treasury from 1954 to 1960, then service in the Ministry of Transport. After serving in other departments, he became Permanent Secretary at the Ministry of Transport in 1968 and was thus involved in implementing some of the Beeching cuts. In 1970 he became Permanent Secretary to the new Department of the Environment, which included transport in its remit. In 1974, two years after retiring from the civil service, he joined the British Railways Board. Writing in 2008, after Serpell's death, the former Labour MP Tam Dalyell would note that the experience made Serpell a 'natural' choice to head the review. However, his obituary in The Guardian noted that Serpell 'was not the first choice as a review chair', with Liberal leader David Steel being considered before him.

== Options ==
For reference, in 1982, journeys totalling 18,300 million passenger-miles were made; the network comprised 10,370 route miles; and BR's passenger deficit was £933 million. The various options for the network considered in Part 2 were as follows:

- Option A was a "commercial" network, in which the railways as a whole would make a profit. This scenario would have seen the route mileage reduced by 84%, and annual passenger-miles reduced by 56%. The only main lines left would have been London-Bristol/Cardiff, London-Birmingham-Liverpool/Manchester-Glasgow/Edinburgh, and London-Leeds/Newcastle. Some major commuter lines in the southeast would have been retained; all other lines would have disappeared completely. The passenger sector would still make a small loss, but this would be offset by profits from the freight sector.
- Option B was similar to Option A, with allowances for the cost of congestion caused by removing rail links. If the removal of a line in Option A would cause a greater cost to the country in terms of increased road congestion than would be saved in removing the line, then the line was retained under Option B. This scenario would have seen the route mileage reduced by 78%, and annual passenger-miles reduced by 45%. The network would have been as per Option A, but with the addition of most of the London commuter lines, plus the London-Westbury section of the Great Western Main Line.
- Option C was a set of three options, each designed to reduce the railways' annual deficit according to a given target:
  - Option C1 would have kept the existing network more or less entirely, only removing the most loss making services. While the network would have been virtually unchanged (at 99% of existing length), many smaller stations would have closed. One lengthy removal would have been the Westbury-Weymouth line. Passenger-miles would have been reduced by about 4%.
  - Option C2 was designed to reduce the annual deficit to £700 million. Loss-making services would have been cut, using a harsher test than Option C1. There would have been some more network cuts, such as the Trowbridge-Melksham-Chippenham line, the branches north of Norwich, the north Devon line from Exeter towards Barnstaple, the Central Wales line between Swansea and Craven Arms, and the Cambrian Coast line west of Shrewsbury. However, most of the savings would have come from service cuts and station closures. This scenario would have seen the route mileage reduced by 17%, and annual passenger-miles reduced by 9%.
  - Option C3 was designed to reduce the annual deficit to £500 million. Major cuts would have included all lines in Wales apart from the valley lines north of Cardiff; all lines in Devon and Cornwall other than the main line link to Exeter; the Salisbury-Exeter line; all lines in East Anglia other than the line to Norwich; all rural lines in Scotland; the trans-Pennine line; and most local lines east of the East Coast Main Line. This scenario would have seen the route mileage reduced by 39%, and annual passenger-miles reduced by 15%.
- Option D was the only option not designed to meet a financial criterion. Instead, connections would have been made to retain services to communities with population greater than 25,000. The result was very similar to Option C2, with only 11 extra communities served.

The report also briefly considered an Option H – a "high investment" option. This looked at the effects of new rolling stock on maintenance costs, and concluded that the return would be far too small.

Otherwise, the report did not seriously examine the effects of improving rail services.

== Effects ==
The report, along with a minority report by Alfred Goldstein, a member of Serpell's committee, was presented to the Secretary of State for Transport on 20 December 1982, but it would be a further month before it was published. However, some aspects of it had already been leaked to the press and had attracted criticism prior to publication. As railway historian David Spaven later wrote, the reaction from the public, press and politicians to the report was 'overwhelmingly adverse'. An editorial in The Guardian in January 1983 described it as 'a really rotten report', while The Glasgow Herald reported that its publication 'attracted almost universal condemnation', causing David Howell, the Secretary of State for Transport, to immediately acknowledge that the Thatcher Government was unlikely to accept any of the 'more extreme options' it outlined. Meanwhile, leader of the opposition Michael Foot called for the report to 'be "strangled" as soon as possible' and the leader of the National Union of Railwaymen also opposed the report which he described as 'a disaster'.

Backbench Conservative MPs were reportedly worried about the political impact of some of the more extreme cuts proposed by the report, especially as a general election was thought likely to be held in the near future. Meanwhile George Younger, then the Scottish Secretary, stated that the Government had no intention of allowing drastic cuts to Scotland's railway services. Mrs Thatcher made it known that decisions on the report would not immediately be taken and it was anticipated it would be shelved until after the general election.

Serpell himself suffered heavy criticism and personal attacks. According to his obituary, he was 'harangued by the guard on his train home to Devon.' He found the personal criticism unfair. In his view, he had merely produced a report to answer a question put by a Minister and it was 'no fault of his that the question was not a sensible one'. Tam Dalyell later claimed that Serpell also regretted that he was asked to look at the issue of railway services solely in terms of economic impact, as this did not allow him to express his opinion that 'railway use was of service to the environment'. Nevertheless, his name became 'synonymous with cuts and closures'.

The report was portrayed by some rail supporters (inaccurately) as a "second Beeching". None of its options (it made no recommendations) were taken up by the government, and it did not result in any network changes. In the words of the railway historian Julian Holland, the report was 'quietly forgotten by the Conservative government.' However, for a few years after the report, British Rail did 'quietly pursue the potential for bus substitution on selected routes' and some rationalisation of infrastructure continued. For some years afterwards, the Conservative Government was accused by its opponents of implementing the report via stealth. Passenger numbers picked up through the mid and late 1980s and continued to grow in the 21st century. The report, and the hostile reaction to it, was described in 2008 as a 'turning point in the fortunes of the national rail network'.

The report also proved to be costly for Howell, who was dropped from the cabinet by Margaret Thatcher later in the year as a result of the fallout.
