= Patrick K. Collins =

Irish-born rugby union player and coach

Patrick K. Collins (born 12 September 1977 in Dublin, Ireland) is the current Assistant Head Coach at Greystones RFC in A.I.B League/Division 2. His previous role was as Youth Development Coach with Munster Rugby. He was appointed to the position in 2006 and worked primarily with the elite age grade players on the Munster Rugby Academy.

== Career ==
Collins was educated at Plymouth College, Devon, and graduated from Surrey University, Surrey (BSc in Sports Science) and at the University of Exeter (Postgraduate Education Diploma). He is a qualified P.E. teacher and has been a former Master at St. Edward's School, Oxford, England, where he was assistant to future England 7s coach Ben Ryan.

He was Head of Boys Sport at Wells Cathedral School, Somerset, England, and as Director of Sport/Rugby at Glenstal Abbey School, County Limerick. While at Glenstal, Collins delivered the two most successful seasons in the history of the school with notable success in both the Senior and Junior Munster Schools Cups and success in the Gold Coast Rugby Festival in Australia. After his success at Glenstal, Collins became sports Co-ordinator at Sandford Park School in Ranelagh, Dublin. He is currently Sports Co-ordinator at Wesley College, Dublin.

As a player, he played club rugby in England with Plymouth Albion and Exeter Chiefs (both in National Division 1), before signing with London Irish in 1999 until a serious knee injury damaging both his cruciate and medial ligaments and shattering his patella (kneecap) ended his playing career. He entered coaching as a result of his injury and soon found success with various school boy and county age group teams. Patrick was appointed as Backs Coach to the Irish Exiles, and coached many players who have progressed to full international honors. With the London-based Exiles, Collins became Head Coach of the U18's and coached them to successful "inter-pro" performances against the home provinces in 2003, 2004 and 2005.

On return to Ireland, Collins took up his role with the Munster Rugby Branch and was Head Coach of the Munster Youths during the 2006–2007 season. Collins worked with the IRFU High Performance Unit and assisted coaching on clinics with age grade players, and with the IRFU as a talent scout identifying future potential Irish players. He is currently the Senior Backs Coach at Greystones RFC who play in the Division 2 of the AIL. Currently Patrick is the head coach of Old Wesley under 20's side, coaching Irish rugby prodigies such as Juergen Steinbach and Luke De Renzy
