= Plymouth College =

Public school in Devon, England

Coordinates: 50°23′03″N 4°08′14″W

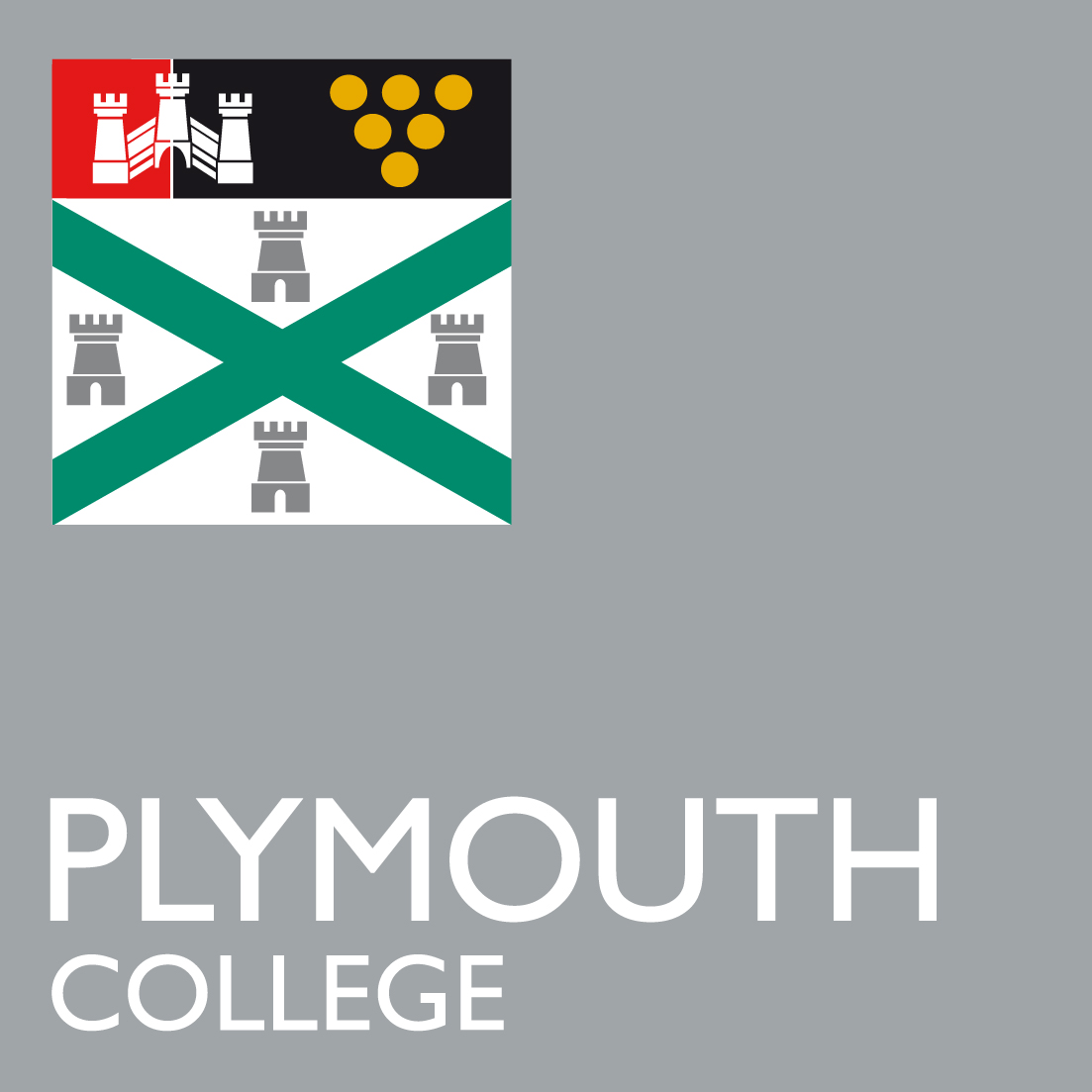
- Plymouth, Devon, PL4 6RN; England

Information
- Type: Public school Private day and boarding school
- Motto: Dat Deus Incrementum
- Established: 1877
- Founder: FH Colson and LF Griffiths
- Department for Education URN: 113609 Tables
- Chairman of governors: Adrian Palmer
- Head: Peter Watts
- Gender: Co-educational
- Age: 3 to 18
- Enrolment: 511
- Houses: 4
- Colours: Black; Green; Red
- Former pupils: Old Plymothians and Mannameadians (OPMs)
- School song: Carmen Collegii Plymothiensis
- Website: https://www.plymouthcollege.com

Plymouth College main building at dusk

Plymouth College is a co-educational private school in Plymouth, Devon.

== History ==
The school was established in 1877. In 1896 Plymouth College bought Mannamead School (founded in 1854), and was temporarily known as Plymouth and Mannamead College.

In 1976, the first girls were admitted to the school's sixth form. Plymouth College became fully coeducational in 1995. In 2004, the school absorbed St Dunstan's Abbey School, an independent school for girls founded by Lydia Sellon.

The Whiteworks Outward Bound centre on Dartmoor has a 20-bed bunkhouse.

== Sports ==
The swimming programme has a partnership with the Plymouth Leander Swimming Club. At the 2012 Olympic Games, Rūta Meilutytė won the gold medal in the 100m breaststroke for Lithuania. In 2019, the under-14 girls hockey team won the national tier 2 championships. Other sports activities in this school include Whitewater rafting, Sea kayaking, Sailing, Mountain biking, and Scuba diving.

== Former teachers ==
- Henry John Chaytor

== Notable alumni ==
- Paul Ackford
- Michael Ball
- Steve Banyard
- Kerenza Bryson
- Patrick K. Collins
- Chris Constantinou
- Michael Cooper (footballer)
- Sir Alfred Woodley Croft
- William Crossing
- Tom Daley
- Richard Deacon
- Stephen Davies
- Sir Rolf Dudley-Williams
- John Fabian
- Michael Foot
- Dawn French
- Wilson Harris
- Stuart Hibberd
- Frank Hoar
- Jade Howard
- William James
- Ronald Jasper
- Alexis Kirke
- Jamila Lunkuse
- Jake Libby
- Alexander Macklin
- David Forbes Martyn
- Sir Alexander Maxwell
- Rūta Meilutytė
- Honey Osrin
- Cassie Patten
- Finn Peters
- David Quantick
- Sir Leonard Rogers
- Paul Seymour
- Peter Seaton-Clark
- Henry Slade
- Milos Stankovic
- Laura Stephens
- Walter Stoneman
- Mark Tavener
- Kavus Torabi
- John Trevaskis
- J. C. Trewin
- Miles Tunnicliff
- Grace Neutral
