= Pat Collins (journalist) =

American journalist (born 1946)

Collins (center) in 2015 posing with his titular 'Snow Stick', a regular feature in his winter weather reporting.

Pat Collins is an American journalist, best known for his work as a field correspondent for NBC 4 Washington. Over nearly 50 years in broadcast television, Collins served stints at Channel 9 CBS and Channel 7 ABC, before settling at NBC 4 in 1986, with whom he remained employed until his retirement in December 2022. Over that time, Collins reported thousands of stories, many of them concerning local criminal activity and weather impacts. Considered to be "NBC 4’s most recognizable on-air reporter", he has garnered national attention on several occasions for his unique reporting style and "quirky, dramatic delivery", described by NPR as "tailor-made for fun and the more unusual stories".

Following a mash-up musical feature on HBO's Last Week Tonight with John Oliver, Collins took on the moniker of "beat poet of local news", owing to his particular pattern and cadence of speech, from which the segment initially derived.

== Biography ==
Pat Collins was born on 6 August 1946 in Washington, D.C., the son of a general practitioner. Raised on Third and H Street Northeast, he attended St. John's High School in Chevy Chase, Maryland before continuing on to the University of Notre Dame. Before the start of his reporting career, he served briefly as a surgeon's assistant during the War in Vietnam.

=== Reporting career ===
Collins' first began work in journalism in 1968 at The Washington Daily News, a short-lived daily tabloid he would later describe as "The Little Engine That Could", deriving from its role as an underdog in the face of much more prolific news operations, namely that of the The Washington Post. Following the tabloid's collapse in 1972, Collins would move to The Washington Evening Star, similarly defined by its underdog status. He would only remain for a year before taking on a position at then Channel 9 WTOP-TV CBS, following the exit of longtime crime reporter Mike Buchanan. Collins' experience in tabloid journalism ultimately translated well to network news, leading to his retention on the Channel 9 staff even after Buchanan's return, whereafter they would work as a team, to great effect, in producing reports on local criminal activity. He would eventually move to Channel 7 ABC, before eventually landing at NBC 4 Washington in 1986.

Collins has received significant praise from local outlets for his empathetic and intentional coverage of crime in the region, noted by DCist as having "learn[ed] the small details that [gave] humanity the many victims of violence in the area". Among the highest profile cases he reported were the arrest of D.C. mayor Marion Barry on drug charges, the disappearance and murder of Chandra Levy, and the Beltway sniper attacks.

Collins first gained national attention in 2011 after donning a man-sized grape costume for a report on a Stafford County high-schooler suspended for wearing a banana novelty suit to class. In 2019, he was featured on a segment of Last Week Tonight's "And Now, This", where clips of his reporting, including a viral segment covering an act of vandalism sparked by infidelity, were remixed into beat poetry "with the help of string instrumentals".

== Personal life ==
Collins is a longtime resident of Washington D.C., and the father of three children. In 2011, in recognition of his winter weather reporting, radio station DC-101 created the "Snowy Pat Collins", a cocktail consisting of peppermint schnapps, Baileys Irish Cream, Creme de cacao, and hot chocolate, among other seasonal additives. In 2012, Collins was partially credited with driving the completion of the 'H Street Heritage Trail', a historical sightseeing route which had stalled in development as a result of payment disputes between the DC city government and local contractors.

== Bibliography ==
- Newsman (2020)

== Additional media ==
- NBC 4 Washington [@nbcwashington] (2016-05-12). ""Everyday's an adventure." - @patcollins4 nbc4dc.com/4VKLEMM" (Tweet) – via Twitter.
- Stabley, Matthew (2016-05-11). "12 Priceless Pat Collins Moments". NBC4 Washington.
