= Eye tattoo =

Eye tattooing may refer to:

- Corneal tattooing
- Scleral tattooing
- Eyelid tattooing (face tattooing)
