= 1990 Birthday Honours =

British government recognitions

The Birthday Honours 1990 for the Commonwealth realms were announced on 15 June 1990, to celebrate the Queen's Birthday of 1990.

The recipients of honours are displayed here as they were styled before their new honour, and arranged firstly by the country whose ministers advised the Queen on the appointments, then by honour, with classes (Knight, Knight Grand Cross, etc.) and then divisions (Military, Civil, etc.) as appropriate.

== United Kingdom ==
=== Life Peers ===
==== Baroness ====
- The Right Honourable Barbara Anne Castle, former Member of Parliament and Member of the European Parliament.
- The Honourable Dame Lydia Selina Dunn, DBE, Chairman Hong Kong Trade Development Council.

==== Baron ====
- Sir Robert Haslam, Chairman, British Coal Corporation.
- Sir Peter Stewart Lane, Chairman of the executive committee, National Union of Conservative and Unionist Associations.
- Professor Sir George Porter, President of the Royal Society.
- The Most Reverend and Right Honourable Robert Alexander Kennedy Runcie, Archbishop of Canterbury.

=== Privy councillor ===
- Malcolm Ian Sinclair, Earl of Caithness, Paymaster-General.
- Sir William Gibson Clark, Member of Parliament, Croydon South.

=== Knights Bachelor ===
- Kingsley William Amis, CBE, Author.
- Thomas Richard Arnold, MP. For political service.
- Anthony Paul Bamford, DL, Chairman and Managing Director, JC Bamford (Excavators).
- John Derek Birkin, TD, Chief Executive and Deputy Chairman, RTZ Corporation.
- Robert Calderwood, Chief Executive, Strathclyde Regional Council.
- Bernard Crossland, CBE, Emeritus Professor, Queen's University, Belfast.
- John Albert Dellow, CBE, Deputy Commissioner, Metropolitan Police.
- William Roland Doughty, Chairman, North West Thames Regional Health Authority.
- Norman Robert Foster, Principal, Foster Associates.
- Ronald Hugh Grierson, Chairman, South Bank Board.
- Peter Heatly, CBE, DL. For services to sports administration.
- Professor Frederick George Thomas Holliday, CBE, DL, Vice-Chancellor and Warden, University of Durham.
- Robert William Kerr Honeycombe, Emeritus Professor of Metallurgy, University of Cambridge.
- Robert Michael Marshall, MP. For political services.
- Robert Arthur McCrindle, MP. For political services.
- Donald John Miller, Chairman, South of Scotland Electricity Board.
- Professor Edgar William John Mitchell, CBE, Chairman, Science and Engineering Research Council.
- Robert Kenelm Morland. For political services.
- William Derek Pattinson, Secretary General, General Synod of the Church of England.
- Daniel Norton Idris Pearce, CBE, TD, DL. For political and public service.
- Peter John Phillips, OBE, Chairman, AB Electronic Products Group.
- Antony Richard Pilkington, DL, Chairman, Pilkington plc.
- Robert Paul (Bob) Reid, Chairman and Chief Executive, Shell (UK) Ltd.
- Michael John de Rougemont Richardson, former Managing Director, N M Rothschild and Sons Ltd.
- Ieuan Wyn Pritchard Roberts, MP. For political service.
- James Wilson Vincent Savile, OBE, Chairman, Broadmoor Hospital Advisory Committee and Stoke Mandeville Hospital Spinal Injuries Centre. For charitable services.
- Allen John George Sheppard, Chairman and Group Chief Executive, Grand Metropolitan plc.
- Robert Shields, Professor of Surgery and Head of Department of Surgery, University of Liverpool.
- William Frederick Stones, OBE, Managing Director, China Light and Power Company Ltd.
- Christopher Samuel Tugendhat, Chairman, Civil Aviation Authority.
- Peter Alexander Ustinov, CBE, Actor, Dramatist and Film Director.
- Edward Dillwyn Williams, Professor of Pathology, University of Wales College of Medicine, President, Royal College of Pathologists.
- Brian Gordon Wolfson, Chairman, Wembley plc. Chairman, National Training Task Force.

=== The Most Honourable Order of the Bath ===
==== Knight Grand Cross of the Order of the Bath (GCB) ====
Civil Division

- The Right Honourable Sir William Frederick Payne Heseltine, GCVO, KCB, AC, QSO, Private Secretary to The Queen.

==== Knights Commander of the Order of the Bath (KCB) ====
Military Division

Royal Navy

- Vice Admiral Kenneth John Eaton.
- Vice Admiral Barry Nigel Wilson.

Civil Division

- Kenneth Carmichael Macdonald, CB, Second Permanent Under Secretary, Ministry of Defence.
- Michael John Anthony Partridge, CB, Permanent Secretary, Department of Social Security.
- James Brian Unwin, CB, Chairman, Board of HM Customs and Excise.
- Patrick Jeremy Walker, Ministry of Defence.

==== Companions of the Order of the Bath (C.B.) ====
Military Division

Royal Navy

- Rear Admiral Hugh Maxwell Balfour, LVO.
- Surgeon Rear Admiral (D) David Arthur Coppock
- Rear Admiral David Partin Pulvertaft

Army

- Major General Patrick Feltrim Fagan, MBE, late Corps of Royal Engineers.
- Major General Christopher Neville Last, OBE, late Royal Corps of Signals.
- Major General James Stuart Lee, MBE, late Royal Army Education Corps.
- Major General Edward George Willmott, OBE, Colonel Commandment Corps of Royal Engineers.

Royal Air Force

- Air Vice-Marshal Michael John Charles Worwood Dicken.
- Air Vice-Marshal Rhys Tudor Brackley Jones, QHS.
- Air Vice-Marshal David Owen Creys-Williams.

Civil Division

- Alan Royle Atherton, Deputy Secretary, Property Services Agency.
- June, Mrs Bridgeman, Grade 3, Department of Transport.
- Robert Brodie, Solicitor, Scottish Office.
- John Latto Farquharson Buist, lately Grade 3, Overseas Development Administration.
- Ian Morgan Burns, Deputy Under Secretary of State, Northern Ireland Office.
- John Anthony Chilcot, Deputy Secretary, Home Office.
- Geoffrey Bernard Claydon, Legal Adviser, Department of Energy.
- James Edward Fraser, Grade 3, Scottish Office.
- John Gustav Haycroft Gasson, Grade 3, Lord Chancellor's Department.
- Robert Anthony Gomme, Grade 3, Property Services Agency.
- Anthony John Lane, Deputy Director General, Office of Fair Trading.
- Graham Scott Pearson, Grade 3, Ministry of Defence.
- Michael Lawrence Saunders, Solicitor, Board of HM Customs and Excise.
- Nicholas Willoughby Stuart, Deputy Secretary, Department of Education and Science.
- William Dickson Thornton, Deputy Chief Medical Officer, Department of Health and Social Services, Northern Ireland.
- John Corelli James Thynne, Grade 3, Department of Trade and Industry.
- William Barry Wakefield, Grade 3, Department of Education and Science.
- Peter John Wormald, Director and Registrar General for England and Wales, Office of Population Censuses and Surveys.

=== Order of Saint Michael and Saint George ===
==== Knights Commander of the Order of St Michael and St George (KCMG) ====
Diplomatic Division

- Nicholas John Barrington, CMG, CVO, British High Commissioner, Islamabad.
- David Howe Gillmore, CMG, Foreign and Commonwealth Office.
- Gordon Wesley Jewkes, CMG, Director-General of Trade and Investment, USA and HM Consul-General, New York.

==== Companions of the Order of St Michael and St George (CMG) ====
Civil Division

- James Innes Maclear Dempster, OBE, for services to civil engineering.
- Alan Wesley Johns, OBE, Executive Director, Royal Commonwealth Society for the Blind.

Diplomatic Division

- Michael John Bradley, QC, Governor, Turks and Caicos Islands.
- Ivan Roy Callan, H.M. Consul-General, Jerusalem.
- Peter James Fowler, Deputy British High Commissioner, New Delhi.
- Anthony Michael Goodenough, British High Commissioner, Accra.
- Alan Charles Hunt, H.M. Charge d'Affaires and Consul-General, Buenos Aires.
- Ian McCluney, H.M. Ambassador, Mogadishu.
- Derek Francis Milton, British High Commissioner, Kingston.
- Anthony Hugh Morgan, H.M. Consul-General, Zurich.
- Alan John Pover, Counsellor and Consul-General, H.M. Embassy, Washington.
- Michael Hewitt Shaw, Foreign and Commonwealth Office.
- Richard Thomas, H.M. Ambassador, Sofia.
- Peter Gordon Wallis, Acting British High Commissioner, Windhoek.
- Frank Basil Wheeler, H.M. Ambassador, Quito.

=== Royal Victorian Order ===
==== Knights Commander of the Royal Victorian Order (KCVO) ====
- Colonel Allan Macdonald Gilmour, OBE, MC.
- Malcolm Rognvald Innes of Edingight, CVO.
- Colonel Bryce Muir Knox, MC, TD.

==== Commanders of the Royal Victorian Order (CVO) ====
- Dr. Alan Breck Gilmour, CBE.
- Alistair Graham Lynn, CBE, QPM.
- Frank Ronald Mintram, LVO.
- Group Captain Philip George Pinney, LVO, Royal Air Force.
- Peter Delaney Smith.

==== Lieutenants of the Royal Victorian Order (LVO) ====
- Reverend James Alexander Keith Angus, TD, MA.
- Deborah Elizabeth Bean, MVO.
- Commander Antony Lovel Chilton, OBE, Royal Navy.
- Dr. Christopher Hugh Dearnley.
- Clement John Govett.
- Clifford George Page.
- David Leslie Smallman
- Robert Ashley Shute Stephenson, MVO.

==== Members of the Royal Victorian Order (MVO) ====
- Paul Martin Almond.
- Caroline Mary Katherine Crichton-Stuart.
- The Honourable Jennifer Bridget Denman.
- Brian George Johnston.
- Charles Patrick Neville Noble.
- Richard John Popplewell.
- Elizabeth Ann Roads.
- Flight Lieutenant Richard Henry Stanton, Royal Air Force.
- Richard Donald Sweetzer.
- Terence Paul Worrall.

=== Royal Victorian Medal ===
==== Royal Victorian Medal (Gold) ====
- Frederick William Mitchell, RVM.
- John Errick Taylor, RVM.

==== Royal Victorian Medal (Silver) ====
- Chief Technician Michael Leslie Anstee, Royal Air Force.
- Frederick George Benefer.
- Flight Sergeant Michael David Burnett, Royal Air Force.
- William Robert Evans.
- John Henry Floyd.
- Ronald James Forsyth.
- Messenger Sergeant-Major Edwin Grant, The Queen's Body Guard of the Yeomen of the Guard.
- Petty Officer Marine Engineering Mechanic (Mechanical) Leslie Richard Green, Royal Navy.
- Jeffery Robert Hampstead.
- Divisional Sergeant-Major Eric Lloyd, The Queen's Body Guard of the Yeomen of the Guard.
- Maurice Orson Musson.
- Elsie Avis Oates.
- Eileen Margaret Wood.

=== Order of the British Empire ===
==== Knight Commander of Order of the British Empire (KBE) ====
Diplomatic

- Terence Joseph Clark, CMG, CVO.
- Dennis Weatherstone.

Overseas Awards

- Air Vice-Marshal Erik Peter Bennett, C.B., Royal Air Force
- Air Marshal Ronald Ian Stuart-Paul, M.B.E., Royal Air Force.

==== Dames Commander of the Order of the British Empire (DBE) ====
Civil Division

- Audrey Pellow, Lady Hylton-Foster, Convenor, Cross Bench Peers, House of Lords.
- June Kathleen Lloyd, Nuffield Professor of Child Health, University of London.

==== Commander of the Order of the British Empire (CBE) ====
Military Division
Royal Navy

- Captain John William Gerald Bench.
- Surgeon Captain Robert John Carmichael.
- Captain Ian Plomer Somerville.

Army

- Colonel Michael Philip Kenneth Beatty, T.D. (461901), Honorary Colonel 35 (South Midland) Signal Regiment (Volunteers).
- Colonel George Edward Cauchi (459224), late Royal Army Pay Corps.
- Colonel Christopher Francis Drewry (488760), late Welsh Guards.
- Brigadier Miles Garth Hunt-Davis, M.B.E. (466744), late 7th Duke of Edinburgh's Own Gurkha Rifles.
- Brigadier Reginald James Neil Kelly (458566), late Corps of Royal Engineers/Postal and Courier Services.
- Brigadier John Francis Rickett, O.B.E. (461643), late Welsh Guards.
- Colonel Graham Henry Silver (469897), late Royal Army Educational Corps.

Air Force

- Group Captain John Victor Bell, Royal Air Force.
- Air Commodore Alan George Hicks, Royal Air Force.
- Air Commodore James Sibbald Martin, Q.H.D.S., Royal Air Force.
- Group Captain Michael John Forsyth Shaw, O.B.E., Royal Air Force.

Civil Division

- Eileen Atkins, actress.
- Kenneth Dawson Bagshawe, Professor of Medical Oncology and Consultant Physician, Charing Cross Hospital, Director, Cancer Research.
- David Arthur Baldwin, Chairman and Managing Director, Hewlett-Packard Ltd.
- Kenneth Frederick Bales, Regional General Manager, West Midlands Regional Health Authority.
- John Godfrey Ball, Chairman, Medical Practices Committee; Consultant Adviser to Chief Medical Officer, Department of Health.
- Robert Christopher Battersby, M.B.E. For political service.
- James Leatham Tennant Birley, President, Royal College of Psychiatrists; Consultant Psychiatrist, The Bethlem Royal and Maudsley Hospital.
- Miss Dorothy Blenkinsop, lately Regional Nursing Officer, Northern Regional Health Authority.
- Duncan Robert Yorke Bluck, O.B.E., lately Chairman, British Tourist Authority and Chairman, English Tourist Board.
- Ian Arthur Dennis Bouchier, Professor of Medicine, University of Edinburgh.
- Charles Stuart Bradley, Managing Director, Associated British Ports.
- Roy Edgar Brimblecombe, Chief Executive, Eagle Star Group.
- Miss Anita Brookner, Novelist.
- John Frederick Brown. For political service.
- Derek Cecil Bunday, Foreign and Commonwealth Office.
- Ian Geoffrey Butler, lately Chairman, Cookson Group plc.
- Henry Hartrick Cavan, O.B.E. For services to Association Football.
- Gerald Clark, Inspector of Companies, Department of Trade and Industry.
- Gerald Dawson Clarkson, Q.F.S.M., Chief Fire Officer and Chief Executive, London Fire Brigade.
- Alan William Clements, Group Finance Director, Imperial Chemical Industries plc.
- John Wentworth Cook. For public services in Scotland.
- Donald Arthur Cooper, A.F.C., Chief Inspector of Air Accidents, Department of Transport.
- John Walter Cooper, Grade 4, Department of Employment.
- Miss June Elizabeth Court, Grade 5, Lord Chancellor's Department.
- David Anthony Crampin, lately Grade 5, Ministry of Defence.
- Jean, Mrs. Denton, Deputy Chairman, Black Country Development Corporation.
- Anne Letitia, Mrs. Dickson, Chairman, General Consumer Council for Northern Ireland.
- Donald Elliott, Q.P .M., H.M. Inspector of Constabulary, South West and East Anglia.
- Leslie Eric Evershed-Martin, O.B.E., Chairman, Productions Company, Chichester Festival Theatre.
- Thomas Farmer, Chairman and Chief Executive, Kwik-Fit, Edinburgh.
- John Brian Finney, Head of Product Services, Agricultural Development and Advisory Service.
- Wilem William Frischmann, Chairman and Partner, Pell Frischmann Consulting Engineers Ltd.
- Anthony Gerard Fleetwood Fuller, Chairman and Managing Director, Fuller, Smith & Turner.
- Robert Gavron, Chairman and Founder, St Ives Group.
- Ian Gibson, Chief Executive, Nissan Motor Manufacturing (UK) Ltd.
- Martin John Gilbert, Historian, Fellow of Merton College, Oxford.
- Robert Kerr Livingstone Gough, Convener, Fife Regional Council.
- Mervyn Alexander Hadden, Chairman, Local Enterprise Development Unit, Northern Ireland.
- Geoffrey Francis Hamilton, Senior Principal Inspector of Taxes, Board of Inland Revenue.
- Michael Harry Frank Hammond, lately Chief Executive and Town Clerk, Nottingham City Council.
- Bernard Anthony Harrison, lately Grade 5, Department of Health.
- Graham James Hearne, Chief Executive, Enterprise Oil.
- William Heeps, Chairman, Thomson Regional Newspapers, International Thomson Organisation Ltd.
- Brian Hill, D.L., Chief Executive, Lancashire County Council.
- Professor Cyril Hilsum, Director of Research, GEC plc.
- Walter Hogbin, Chairman and Managing Director, Taylor Woodrow. For services to Export.
- Kenneth Edmund Holmes, Chairman, H Beare and Sons Ltd. Chairman, South West Industrial Development Board.
- John Everard Hosking, Chairman of the Council, Magistrates' Association
- Eric James Howe, Data Protection Registrar.
- Adam Kenneth Fisher Hunter, lately Sheriff of North Strathclyde, Paisley Sheriff Court.
- Paul Cater Hyde-Thomson, D.L. For political and public service.
- Peter Jackson, Executive Director, British Food and Farming Year.
- Rabbi Louis Jacobs, Rabbi, New London Synagogue.
- Peter Roy Albert Jacques, Secretary, Social Insurance and Industrial Welfare Department, Trades Union Congress.
- John Nigel Courtenay James, Executive Trustee, The Grosvenor Estate. Crown Estate Commissioner.
- Henry Bernard Levin. For services to Journalism and Broadcasting.
- Professor John Marshall, Chairman, Attendance Allowance Board.
- Miss Fiona McConnell, Grade 5, Department of the Environment.
- Stewart Crichton Miller, Director of Engineering, Rolls-Royce plc.
- Charles Herbert Mitchell, D.L., Chairman and Managing Director, Century Oils Group plc.
- Charles Evan Henry Morris, Chief Executive, Sheerness Steel Company plc.
- Jean Daveena Ogilvy, Mrs. Morris, M.B.E., Chairman, Parole Board of Scotland.
- Ian Hill Nish, Professor, International History, University of London.
- Roger Arthur Carver Norrington, O.B.E., Musical Director, London Classical Players.
- Professor Charles Herbert Geoffrey Oldham, Professional Fellow and Director, Science Policy Research Unit, University of Sussex.
- Anne Mary, Mrs. Parker, Director of Social Services, Royal County of Berkshire.
- Margaret, Lady Parkes. For services to the National Curriculum Design and Technology Working Group.
- Michael Sydney Perry, O.B.E., Chairman, Japan Trade Advisory Group. For services to Export.
- Miss Mary Elizabeth Peters, M.B.E. For services to Sport.
- Miss Margaret Eva Rayner, lately Vice-Chairman, Schools Examination and Assessment Council; Vice-Principal, St. Hilda's College.
- Peter Philip Rigby. For services to the City of London Corporation.
- Michael Jeremy Lomax Sayers, For services to horticulture.
- Barry Edward Sealey, Deputy Chairman, Christian Salveson plc., Edinburgh.
- Gordon Robert Seward, Professor of Oral and Maxillo-facial Surgery, The London Hospital Medical College.
- John Michael Sewell. For political and public service.
- Norbert Singer, Director, Thames Polytechnic.
- Graham William Smith, Chief Probation Officer, Inner London Probation Service.
- Bernard Leonard John Spratt, lately Grade 5, Crown Prosecution Service.
- Professor F. Gordon A. Stone, Head, Department of Inorganic Chemistry, University of Bristol.
- Jeffrey Philip Tate, Principal Conductor, English Chamber Orchestra; Principal Conductor, Royal Opera House, Covent Garden.
- Frank Thomlinson, Chairman, Horticultural Development Council.
- Colonel George Digby Thompson, M.C., T.D., lately Honorary Colonel, Inns of Court and City Yeomanry, Territorial Auxiliary and Volunteer Reserve Association, Greater London.
- Peter Tompkins, H.M. Chief Inspector of Immigration.
- John Rosewarne Trahair, lately Chairman, Plymouth Health Authority.
- Peter Joseph Usher, O.B.E., Deputy Chairman, Vosper Thorneycroft (UK) pic.
- Alan Warhurst, Director, Manchester Museum.
- Leonard John Weaver, Chairman, Polymark International pic.
- John Kay Welsby, Member, Chief Executive (Railways), British Railways Board
- Thomas Henry Martin Whipham, President, London Rent Assessment Panel.
- John Michael Stannage Whitehead, D.L., Chairman, Board of Governors, Leicester Polytechnic.
- Anthony Basil Wilbraham. For political service.
- Richard Geoffrey Wilkes, O.B.E., T.D., D.L., lately Consulting Partner, Price Waterhouse.
- Ronald Millward Williams, D.L., Chairman, Southend Health Authority; Member, Essex County Council.
- Thomas Brendan Wilson, Emeritus Professor of Music, University of Glasgow.
- Charles.Milne Winter, Group Chief Executive, The Royal Bank of Scotland Group plc.
- Anthony John Keith Woodhead. For political service.

Diplomatic list

- Frederick William Harold Allen
- Robert Kilgour Booker
- John Dartnall Dexter, MBE.
- Harnam Singh Grewal, ED, JP.
- John Mark Ambrose Herdman, LVO.
- David Alan Challoner Nendick, JP.
- Trevor John Rutter, OBE.
- Thomas Hixson Savage.
- John Francis Yaxley, JP.

==== Officer of the Order of the British Empire (OBE) ====
Civil Division

- Colin Alves, Secretary, General Synod of the Church of England's Board of Education.
- Joyce Anne, Mrs. Anelay. For political and public service.
- Andrew Patterson Armstrong, Deputy District Manager, Total Oil Marine, Aberdeen.
- Reginald Richard William Arnell, Managing Director, Finance British Shipbuilders.
- Richard Stuart Atkinson, Consultant Anaesthetist, Southend District Health Authority.
- Melvyn Peter Keith Barnes, Guildhall Librarian and Director of Libraries and Art Galleries, City of London.
- Thomas Alan Frank Barnes, Chairman, National Rivers Authority, North West Regional Fisheries Advisory Committee.
- Pamela, Lady Barnett, Chairman, Wiltshire Branch and Member of Council, Soldiers', Sailors' and Airmen's Families Association.
- Miss Sybil Adelaide Beresford-Peirse. For services to The Nordoff-Robbins Music Therapy Centre.
- James Berry, Poet.
- Elizabeth, Mrs. Blaydes. For services to Lacrosse.
- George Philip Brown, lately Senior Assistant Accountant, House of Commons.
- Elizabeth Anne, Mrs. Browning, National Chairman, Women's Farming Union.
- John Lome Campbell, For services to Conservation on the Isle of Canna and to Gaelic History.
- John Athelstan Chartres, T.D., Author and Journalist. For services to Journalism.
- Dorothy, Mrs. Clarkson, Chairman and Trustee, Clarkson Jersey Charitable Trust.
- David Brinley Clay Jones. For services to Broadcasting and Gardening in Wales.
- James Brian Clouston, Chairman RPS Group plc, Environmental Consultants.
- Miss Mary Patricia Cole, Founder and Chairman, St. Ann's Hospice, Manchester.
- Bernard Coleman. For services to Cricket.
- Brian Robert Coleman, Ministry of Defence.
- William James Colwill, Grade 6, Central Office of Information.
- John Michael Corner, Editor, The Star, Sheffield.
- Michael John Coupland, lately Technical Director, Components, STC plc.
- John Egwin Craig, lately Chairman, Executive Committee, British Bankers' Association.
- William Crawforth, Manager, Property Services Department, Navy, Army and Air Force Institutes, London.
- John Cripwell, Director, National Trust, Wessex Region.
- The Very Reverend George Philip Chorley Crosfield, Provost, St. Mary's Cathedral, Edinburgh.
- Reginald Charles Cross, President and Chairman, Polytechnic of Huddersfield Governing Council.
- William Mackenzie Currie, lately Head of Marketing and Sales Department, Harwell Laboratory, United Kingdom Atomic Energy Authority.
- John Knight Davidson, Consultant Radiologist, Western Infirmary and Gartnavel General Hospital, Glasgow.
- Samuel Ivan Davidson, Headmaster, Killard House Special School, Newtownards.
- Kathleen Anne, Mrs. Davies. For services to the Disabled.
- Trevor Dickinson, H.M. Inspector of Schools, Department of Education and Science.
- Professor Allan St John Dixon. For services to Medicine.
- Gordon Henri Dodd, Operations Director, FBM Marine Ltd, Cowes, Isle of Wight.
- Dennis Eric Dolman, Official Receiver (A), The Insolvency Service.
- Alistair Donaldson, County Surveyor and Bridgemaster, Clwyd County Council.
- Captain Charles Andrew Douds, R.N. (Retd.), lately Chief Executive, The Mary Rose Trust.
- Ronald Ingram Drake, President, Drakes Refrigeration Ltd.
- Anthony Terence Draycott, Clerk to the Doncaster Justices.
- Maldwin Andrew Cyril Drummond, D.L. For public services and services to Conservation.
- Daniel Francis Dunford, Former Chief Commissioner, Wales, The Scout Association.
- Michael Noel Eggleton, Group Technical and Safety Adviser, Yorkshire Electricity Group plc.
- Nigel Anthony Eldred, Chairman and Managing Director, Salford University Business Services Ltd.
- John Elliot, Grade 7, Training Agency, Department of Employment.
- Miss Lynne Mary Elson. For political service.
- David Ritchie Fairbairn, Group Managing Director, James Martin Associates plc.
- Mary Lilian, Mrs. Fairhead. For political and public service.
- James Fairlie, lately Managing and Production Director, Glenturret Distillery.
- Andrew Burton Fairweather, T.D., Grade 6, Scottish Office.
- Peter Trevor Fenwick, Chairman, British Horse Society.
- Kenneth Gordon Ferguson. For political service.
- David Francis Finch, Deputy Chief Probation Officer, Greater Manchester.
- Professor Ludwik Finkelstein, Chief Regional Scientific Adviser, No. 5 Region, London Civil Defence.
- Nicholas Hugh Finney, lately Director, National Association of Port Employers.
- Cedric Charles Gainsborough Foot, Director, Corporate Relations, Philips Electronics.
- Professor William Forster, Head of Department and Professor of Adult Education, University of Leicester.
- John Peter Foster, lately Surveyor, St. Margaret's Church, Westminster.
- Peter Thomas Fox, Headteacher, St. Thomas More School, London Borough of Haringey.
- Diana, Mrs. Franks. For political and public service.
- Harold Fullard. For services to Cartography.
- James Callaghan Gardner, Member, North West Hertfordshire Health Authority.
- Martin George, lately Regional Officer, East Anglian Region, Nature Conservancy Council.
- Ronald Bryan Gibbon, HQ Director, Construction, British Gas plc.
- Maurice John Gifford, lately General Secretary, National Association of Inspectors and Educational Advisers.
- Alan Charles Gilbert. For political and public service.
- Professor Charles Henry Gimingham, lately Commissioner, Countryside Commission for Scotland.
- Roy Frederick Godier, Plant Manager, Ford Motor Company Ltd, Bridgend, Mid Glamorgan.
- Michael Francis Goulding, Florist.
- Newton Keene Grant, Chairman, The Hearing Aid Council.
- Melvyn Greene. For services to the Hotel Catering and Tourism Industry.
- Michael Anthony Gregory, lately Chief Legal Adviser, Country Landowners' Association.
- Peter Hackett, Principal, Camborne School of Mines, Cornwall.
- Ian Michael Harris, Managing Director, Bonas Machine Company Ltd. For services to Export.
- Thomas Gerard Harrison, M.B.E. For charitable services to the Armed Forces.
- Arthur George Hearnden, General Secretary, Independent School Joint Council.
- Henry Heath, Emeritus Reader, Biochemical Pathology, University of London.
- Professor Charles Alistair Michael Hennessy, Director, Centre of Caribbean Studies, University of Warwick.
- David Small Hewet, Chairman, Lord Chancellor's Advisory Committee on Justices of the Peace, Sunderland and Houghton le Spring.
- Brian Neil Hitchcox, Architect, Department of Health.
- Roma Rani, Mrs. Hoon, Senior Legal Assistant, Department of Social Security.
- Derek Gregory Hornby, Director and General Manager, Traffic, Siemens Plessey Controls Ltd.
- Anthony Horsfield, Grade 6, National Physical Laboratory.
- Ian Bryson Howie, Estate Manager, Hereford. For services to agricultural development.
- George Elliott Howlett, Q.P.M. Commander, Metropolitan Police.
- John Kenneth Hulme, lately Director, Botanic Gardens, University of Liverpool.
- Geoffrey William Hulse, Chief Executive, Chamber of Commerce and Industry, Nottinghamshire.
- Shirley Patricia, Mrs. Jenkins, Principal Scientific Officer, Royal Aerospace Establishment, Farnborough.
- Bryan Robert Johnston, Chief Executive, TSB Northern Ireland plc.
- David Scott Johnston, Chief Executive, National Farmers' Union of Scotland.
- Peter William Johnstone, Inspector of Taxes (SP), Board of Inland Revenue.
- John Jones, Deputy Director of Personnel, Commonwealth War Graves Commission.
- James Jordan, Board Member, Agricultural Research Institute of Northern Ireland.
- Maxwell Brian Kelly, Sales Director, Dowty Aerospace.
- Derek Harold Kemp. For political service.
- Michael Ronald John Kenward, lately Editor, New Scientist.
- Sidney Kessler, Professor of Industrial Relations, The City University.
- Alan Edward Kilburn, Chief Executive, North Housing Association Ltd.
- Anthony Bernard King, Principal Professional and Technology Officer (A), Department of the Environment.
- George Bryan Kirkwood. For services to Pharmacy.
- Margaret Callander, Mrs. Lambie. For political service.
- John Francis Lawrie. For political service.
- Philippe Anthonie David Le Roux, Chief Executive, Norton Group plc.
- Philip Leigh-Bramwell. For services to the community in Bolton and for charitable services.
- Thomas Arthur Linley, Head, Education and Training, British Paper and Board Industry Federation.
- John Brian Ford Lloyd, Grade 6, Home Office.
- Richard Lloyd, lately Grade 7, Ministry of Agriculture, Fisheries and Food.
- Mary Doreen, Mrs. Lobel, Editor, The Atlas of Historic Towns of England.
- Derek Lockwood. For political service.
- Melvin Charles Lort, Secretary and Finance Officer, National Biological Standards Board; Assistant Director, NIBSC.
- Donald Mackay Macarthur, Secretary, United Kingdom Softwood Sawmillers' Association.
- Miss Jane Marian Manning, Freelance Concert and Opera Singer.
- Hugh Stewart Derek Marks, Headmaster, The Royal School for the Blind, Liverpool.
- Alexander Matheson, Former Convenor, Western Isles Council.
- George Charles Maxted, lately General Secretary, Association of Chief Police Officers.
- George McBride McAlpine, lately Director, Scottish Area, British Coal Corporation.
- Archibald Eddington McCunn, lately Member, Highlands and Islands Development Board.
- Ian Robert McGeechan. For services to Rugby Football.
- William McNeill, Principal, Perth College of Further Education.
- Malcolm McSwan, Managing Director, Racal-MESL Ltd, Newbridge.
- Douglas Wilmar Mickel, Chairman and Managing Director, Mactaggart and Mickel Ltd.
- Derek John Mortimer, Principal, Suffolk College of Higher and Further Education.
- John Stanley Morton, Technical Director, Whipp and Bourne Ltd, Rochdale.
- Thomas Murtagh, Governor Grade II, Northern Ireland Prison Service.
- Professor John Frederick Norbury, Senior Research Fellow, Department of Mechanical Engineering, University of Liverpool.
- William Anderson Norris, Consultant Psychiatrist, Purdysburn Hospital, Belfast.
- June Patricia, Mrs. O'Dell, Deputy Chair, Equal Opportunities Commission.
- Bruce Oldfield, Fashion Designer.
- Arthur William Oldham, Director, Edinburgh Festival Chorus.
- David Ernest Oliver, lately Technical Director, Electro-Medical Supplies (Greenham) Ltd.
- Vivian Julian Palmer, Grade 7, Ministry of Defence.
- Thomas Alfred Peattie, lately General Manager, Ulster Carpet Mills Ltd.
- Alan George Peters, Furniture Maker. For services to Furniture Design.
- Michael Harold Barry Peters, Chairman, Michael Peters Group plc.
- John Louis Charles Pickett, Regional Child Care Manager, National Society for Prevention of Cruelty to Children.
- George Anthony Lane-Fox Pitt-Rivers, D.L. For political service.
- Kenneth Pollard, lately Principal Scientific Officer, Meteorological Office, Bracknell.
- Miss Diana Potter, Chief Organiser, Thames Telethon.
- Bob Ronald Potter. For political and public service.
- Leonard Pugh, Music Adviser, Belfast Education and Library Board.
- Henry Purcell. For political service.
- Marion, Mrs. Rawlings, President, Royal Pharmaceutical Society of Great Britain.
- John Malcolm Rea, Divisional Director, Child Care for Scotland, Barnardo's.
- Eleanor Maysie Hope, Mrs. Readman, lately Chairman of Council, Scottish Branch, British Red Cross Society.
- Denis George Richards, Air Historian.
- Vincent Edward Ricks, lately Grade 7, Admiralty and Commercial Registry, Lord Chancellor's Department.
- William Kerr Ritchie, Principal General Manager, Material and Components Research, British Telecommunications plc.
- Alexander Rose Robertson, Publicity Manager, General Accident Insurance Group.
- Robert Bradbury Robinson, T.D., D.L., Chairman, North Derbyshire Health Authority.
- Michael Rogers, Q.F.S.M., lately Chief Officer, West Sussex Fire Brigade.
- Margaret Elaine, Mrs. Rose, Grade 6, Division of Immunology, Houghton Laboratory Agricultural and Food Research Council.
- Agnes Rebecca Rea, Mrs. Roulston, Assistant Director, Social Work Department, Fife Regional Council.
- Deirdre Mary Patrick, Mrs. Sandford. For public service in Northern Ireland.
- Frank Reginald Scutt, Director, Information Systems, Dental Practice Board.
- William Donald Shearer, Principal Collector of Taxes, Board of Inland Revenue.
- Miss Anne Shelton. For services to the "Not Forgotten" Association.
- Bryan Alexander Sheppard, Programme Director, Marconi Defence Systems Ltd.
- Neville Shulman. For charitable services.
- Alastair Sinclair, Regional Reporter, Children's Panel Borders Region.
- Elizabeth Anne, Mrs. Smith. For political and public service.
- Ronald Southern, lately Leader, Stoke-on-Trent City Council.
- Margaret Peel, Mrs. Spriggs, M.B.E. For services to Greater Manchester Women's Royal Voluntary Service.
- Anthony Gregory Stanton, Director, Tibbett and Britten Group plc.
- George Anthony Storey, Headteacher, Hayfield Comprehensive School.
- Harold Keith Taviner, lately Leader, Wansdyke District Council.
- John Laverack Taylor, Principal, Bretton Hall College of Higher Education, Wakefield.
- William Gwynfor Thomas, lately Chief Executive and Managing Director, Merseyside Transport Ltd.
- Brian Thompson, Managing Director, Dominick Hunter Filters Ltd. For services to Export.
- Thomas Bacon French Thompson. For services to the community in Northern Ireland.
- Balfour Thomson, T.D. For services to the Royal British Legion and Earl Haig Fund, Scotland.
- Robert Scott Thomson, Rector, Larkhall Academy, Larkhall, Lanarkshire.
- James Baden Thorp, Chief Law Clerk, West Yorkshire, Crown Prosecution Service.
- Margaret, Mrs. Todd, lately Chairman, Durham Health Authority.
- David Arnold Tombs, Director of Social Services, Hereford and Worcester County Council.
- David Roy Trowbridge, Member, European Trade Committee, British Overseas Trade Board. For Services to Export.
- Captain Brian Vale, Principal Surveyor, Surveyor General's Organisation Marine Directorate, Department of Transport.
- Ross Joseph Vettriano, Director, Environmental Health, North East Fife District Council.
- Charles Arthur Veys, International Group Chief Medical Adviser, Michelin Tyre plc.
- Miss Sheila Margaret Waghorn, First Secretary, Foreign and Commonwealth Office.
- Colin Waine, Unit General Manager (Community), General Practitioner, County Durham.
- Peter James Walker. For services to the Audio Industry.
- William David Walker. For political and public service.
- Malcolm Wallace, Steel and Wire pic. Executive Director, Allied Steel and Wire plc.
- John Hopkins Warden, Freelance Writer.
- Margaret Helen, Mrs. Washington. For public service in Cumbria.
- Andrew Forbes Watson, lately Chief Executive and Town Clerk, Plymouth City Council.
- Frederick George Watson. For political and public service.
- Trevor John Weare, Managing Director, Hydraulics Research Ltd.
- Evelyn Raymond Wheatley-Hubbard, lately Deputy Chairman, Landscape Advisory Committee.
- Adrian Leon Whiteson, Chief Medical Officer, British Boxing Board of Control.
- Howard Keith Wilkins, Director of Planning, British Airways plc.
- The Reverend Canon Robert Williams. For public service. Vice-Chairman, Gwynedd Health Authority.
- Arthur William Wills, Organist and Master of Choristers, Ely Cathedral.
- Miss Violet Jane Wilson, Director, Her Majesty's Stationery Office, Belfast.
- Christopher Stephan Hugh Zeuner, Director, Weald and Downland Open Air Museum, Singleton, West Sussex.

Diplomatic and Overseas list

- Rex Alexander Kinloch Baker, lately British CouncilcRepresentative, Sri Lanka.
- Henry Sackville Barlow. For services to British commercial interests in Malaysia.
- Frederick Colborn Bernard Bean, Q.P.M., C.P.M., lately Commissioner of Police, Bermuda.
- William Jackson Buckland. For services to agricultural development in Swaziland.
- Miss Sally Muriel Bull, L.V.O., First Secretary (Aid). British High Commission, Nairobi.
- John Eustance Evans. For services to British commercial interests in Switzerland.
- John William Forbes-Meyler, Deputy Head of Mission, H.M. Embassy, Bogota.
- John Francis Godsall, M.C., For services to the copper mining industry in Zambia.
- John Leslie Michael Gorrie. For services to British community interests in Singapore.
- David George Heard. For services to British community interests in Abu Dhabi.
- Ho Sai-chu, M.B.E., J.P., For public services in Hong Kong.
- Anthony Gilbert Winston Hodge. For services to British commercial interests in Tokyo.
- Roy Alan Humphrey, lately Head of Maritime & Tourism Division, OECD, Paris.
- Robert Jeffrey Hutt, J.P., Director of Audit, Hong Kong.
- Dr. Hugh Francis Lamprey. For services to wildlife conservation in East Africa.
- Dr. John Lo Siew-Kiong, J.P. For public services in Hong Kong.
- David Sherriif Manson. For services to British commercial and community interests in Nigeria.
- Professor Philip Davies Marsden. For services to tropical medicine in Brazil.
- John Barrington Midgley, First Secretary & Consul-General, H.M. Embassy, Riyadh.
- Dr. Cedric Mortimer. For services to geological surveying in Jordan.
- Christopher Robert Geoffrey Page, First Secretary, H.M. Embassy, Maputo.
- Alexander James Pattison, Cultural Attache (British Council), H.M. Embassy, Bucharest.
- Henry Allen Payne, Lately First Secretary (Commercial), British High Commission, Wellington.
- Hugh Robert Howe Salmon, lately British Council Representative, Philippines.
- Michael David Shipster, lately First Secretary, British High Commission, New Delhi.
- Dr. John Barry Smithson. For services to agricultural development in Tanzania.
- Leonard Murray Sneddon, Director, Senior Staff Course Centre, Hong Kong.
- Gordon Thomas Spate, T.D., For services to British commercial interests in Panama.
- Robert Macalaster Symington. For services to British commercial & community interests in Lisbon.
- Mrs. Rosanna Tam Wong Yick-ming, J.P. For public services in Hong Kong.
- Peter John Whittaker Taylor, British Council Representative, Morocco.
- John Turnbull. For services to British commercial interests in Indonesia.
- Desmond Stevens Whittle. For services to British commercial interests in Istanbul.
- John Vernon Wilkins. For services to agricultural development in Bolivia.

==== Member of the Order of the British Empire (MBE) ====
Civil Division

- Miss Lesley Julia Abdela. For services to the advancement of Women in Politics and Local Government.
- George Stephen Abel, Group Managing Director, British Road Services, Ltd.
- Angus Andrews, Deputy County President, Suifolk Branch, St John Ambulance Brigade.
- John Brendon Archer. For services to the community in Northallerton, North Yorkshire.
- Alastair Brian Atkin, Industry and Environment Co-ordinator, Conoco Ltd.
- George William Atkinson. For services to the community in Morley, Leeds.
- Miss Elizabeth Cora Catherine Baker, Florist.
- John Anthony Baker, District Pharmaceutical Officer, Riverside Health Authority.
- Norman Charles Bancroft, lately Secretary, South Western Electricity Consultative Council.
- Miss Mary Mckenzie Barclay, Formerly Headteacher, Burdiehouse Primary School, Edinburgh.
- Dennis Walter Bareham, Essex County Officer, Agricultural and Allied Workers' National Trade Group, Transport & General Workers' Union.
- Peter Johnson Barker, Broadcaster, British Broadcasting Corporation.
- Lieutenant Colonel John Anthony Sandbach Barkworth (Retd.), Vice-Chairman, Ocean Youth Club, Leicestershire.
- Sheila, Mrs. Barlow. For services to Opera.
- Francis Edgar Bartholomew, Head of Design Integrity, Hunting Engineering Ltd, Ampthill.
- Colin Geoffrey Bashford, lately Senior Professional and Technology Officer, Department of the Environment.
- Brian Batley, Managing Director and Chief Executive, W and J Whitehead (Laisterdyke) Ltd.
- Trevor Baxter, Organiser and Chairman, Gloucestershire "Villager" Community Bus Service.
- Miss Mary Francis Pamela Aufrere Beattie, D.L. For charitable services and services to the community in Essex.
- John Albert Bence, Chairman, Bence Equipment and Parts.
- Frederick John William Bentley. For services to the Bakery Trade.
- Miss Annalyn Bhanji, Actor and Teacher, Leeds Theatre in Education Company.
- Cyril Albert Blachford, Chairman, Ormskirk Branch, Royal Air Force Association.
- Miss Anne Galloway McKinna Black, Divisional Director, Lothian Regional Council Social Work Department.
- Ian Douglas Blackhall, Chairman, Confederation of Associations of Specialist Engineering Contractors.
- The Reverend Eric Leslie Blakebrough, Project Director, Kaleidoscope, Youth and Community Project.
- Janette May Porterfield, Mrs. Blanckenhagen, Director, Breast Care and Mastectomy Association of Great Britain.
- Gordon John Bolt, Pro-Director, Part-time Studies, Bristol Polytechnic.
- Miss Joan Mary Booker, lately Director of Midwifery Services, St Peter's Hospital, Chertsey, Surrey.
- Henry Michael Booth, Director, E. H. Booth and Company Ltd.
- Miss Pamela Joan Brererton, District Dietician, Harrow Health Authority.
- Miss Karen Valerie Briggs. For services to Women's Judo.
- Michael Bromley, H.M. Inspector of Factories IB, Health and Safety Executive.
- Elsie Edith, Mrs. Broughton. For services to the Elderly in Middlesex.
- Diana Hope Holland, Mrs. Brown, Chairman, Housing Committee, East Staffordshire District Council.
- Sheila Elsie, Mrs. Brown, International Liaison Officer, Pebble Mill, British Broadcasting Corporation.
- Thomas Strachan Buchan, Chairman, Peterhead Harbour Trustees.
- James Anthony Burckhardt, Member, Caribbean Trade Advisory Group. For services to Export.
- Colin Charles Burford, Assistant County Surveyor, Waste Disposal, Lancashire County Council.
- Lester Cecil Burke, Vice-Chairman of Governors, Lee Bank Junior School, Birmingham.
- Millicent Kay, Mrs. Burkhill, Member, Board of Management, North British Housing Association.
- John Richardson Burt, General Medical Practitioner, Dunfermline.
- John Henry Richard Burton. For services to the community in Hastings.
- James Francis Butler, Senior Personnel and Training Superintendent, Cunard Ellerrnan.
- Clinton Lloyd Cameron, Chairman, Leeds Federated Housing Association.
- George Campbell, Principal Teacher, Technical Education, North Kelvinside Secondary School, Glasgow.
- James Campbell, Departmental Manager, O'Kane Poultry Ltd.
- Thomas Winston Cannell, Project Manager, The Express Lift Company Ltd.
- Meredith Roger Carter, Director, Heart of England Tourist Board.
- Ernest John Case, Field Operations Manager, Department of Employment.
- Mihir Kumar Chakrabarti, Senior Chief Medical Physics Technician, Royal Postgraduate Medical School, University of London.
- Holly Alice Mary, Mrs. Champion. For political and public service.
- Charlie Chester, Entertainer. For charitable services.
- Colin Roy Clark, Road Safety Officer, London Borough of Croydon.
- Kenneth Inman Carr Clark. For services to art and design.
- Lieutenant Colonel Wentworth Douglas Clark, lately Curator, John Milton's Cottage, Buckinghamshire.
- Michael Claughton, Senior Divisional Officer, Somerset Fire Brigade.
- Richard Loris Clegg. For services to English Coarse Fishing.
- Lionel Alexander Perkins Coles, lately General Manager, Welland Valley Newspapers, East.
- Peter William Collier, Deputy Chairman, Advisory Committee on Scotland's Travelling People.
- Daniel James Connolly, Department of Social Security. Local Officer,
- Colin Ernest Cook, Principal, Mid-Cheshire Sheltered Workshop Trust.
- Desmond John Cook, Head Teacher, Dumolo's Primary School, Tamworth, Staffordshire.
- Robert Douglas Lay Coombs. For political service.
- Miss Barbara Cooper, lately National Secretary, Women's Section, The Royal British Legion.
- Winifred Beatrice, Mrs. Cooper. For services to the community in Harwich.
- Shelagh Mary, Mrs. Cox, Senior Executive Officer, Lord Chancellor's Department.
- Margaret Eleanor, Mrs. Darley . For services to the community in Grimsby, South Humberside.
- Alfred Stanley George Davey, lately Administrator, Broughton House, Home for Disabled Ex-Servicemen, Salford.
- Randal Davis, Ministry of Defence.
- Miss Hilda May Denness, Local Officer I, Department of Social Security.
- Geoffrey William Dilbey, Sales Director, Bridport Aviation Products Ltd.
- Miss Annie Elizabeth Pearl Dowd, Vice-Principal, Dungannon Secondary School.
- Catherine Shearer, Mrs. Downie, Headteacher,
- Miss June Daphne Drever, lately Assistant Private Secretary, Prime Minister's Office.
- Miss Joyce Mary Duffill, Headteacher, Royce County Primary School, Manchester.
- Margaret Freda, Mrs. Duigan. For political and public service.
- Geoffrey Eric Sugden Dunlop, Estate Factor, Skipness and Claonaig Estate, Argyll.
- William Robert Dunn, Chairman, Sunderland War Pensions Committee.
- Hugh Martyn Edwards, Sussex Police.
- John Henry Edwards, Evaluation Centre, GKN Technology Ltd.
- Miss Tracy Karen Edwards. For services to Yacht Racing.
- Michael William Egleton, Local Officer I, Department of Social Security.
- Miss Ruth Ellen Ellard, lately Private Secretary, Josiah Wedgwood and Sons.
- Peter Elliott. For services to Athletics.
- Dennis Walter Emberley, For services to the British Foreign Service, Vancouver, Canada
- Frederick William Everiss, Export Sales Manager, Wednesbury Tube.
- Margaret Muriel, Mrs. Farnworth-Smith. For services to the community in Sandbach, Cheshire.
- Denis Stanley Fawcett. For services to the No. 41 Royal Marines Commando Unit.
- Suzanne Elizabeth, Mrs. Feltham, Specialist Teleprinter Operator, Ministry of Defence.
- Stanley Finlayson, Manager, Claymore Creamery, Kirkwall.
- Thomas Malcolm Finlayson, Detective Superintendent, Fife Constabulary.
- Enid Mary Muriel, Mrs. Foster, Head Librarian, British Theatre Association.
- Lewis Norman Francis, Fire Control Officer, Dorset Fire Brigade.
- Eric John Gadd. For services to the community in Bristol.
- Miss Elizabeth Gadsby, Director, Hotel Catering and Institutional Management Association.
- Mary Ellen, Mrs. Galbraith. For services to the British Red Cross Society, Northern Ireland.
- Margaret Susan, Mrs. Gardner. For political and public service.
- Edward Stanley Gill, Personnel Manager, Vickers Shipbuilding and Engineering Ltd, Barrow-in-Furness.
- John Goodman, Manager, Mechanical Development, Rolls-Royce and Associates, Derby.
- John William Gosney, lately Inspector of Taxes, Board of Inland Revenue.
- John Lawrie Gove, Steward Class II, Her Majesty's Prison, Edinburgh.
- Miss Lesley Dunbar Grant. For political service.
- Barbara, Mrs. Gray, Nurse Manager, Paediatrics and Child Health, Isle of Wight.
- Miss Winifred Mary Gray, Higher Executive Officer, Department of Social Security.
- Kenneth Green. For services to the St John Ambulance Brigade, Stoke-on-Trent.
- Robin Mark Griffin, Assistant Master, The Manchester Grammar School.
- Jonathan Michael Grimshaw, Director, South London HIV Centre, " The Landmark ".
- William Graham Gunn, Higher Executive Officer, Department of Health.
- James Haigh, Managing Director, F Drake and Company of Golcar Ltd. For services to Export.
- Miss Amy Alice Hall, E.R.D. For political service. Peter Ronald HALL, lately Senior and Professional Technology Officer, Ministry of Defence.
- Samuel David Hall, Superintendent, Royal Ulster Constabulary.
- Miss Margaret Edna Halliday, Divisional Nurse Manager, South Hams Hospital, Plymouth Health Authority.
- Joseph Sloane Handcock, Superintendent, Royal Ulster Constabulary.
- Ronald Hardon, Senior Professional and Technology Officer, Department of the Environment.
- Sidney Alfred Harrison, Farm Manager, Ministry of Agriculture, Fisheries and Food.
- John Leonard Hart. For services to the Hard of Hearing.
- Miss Patricia Mary Collins Hart. For voluntary service to the Cambridge House Legal Centre, Camberwell.
- Rodney Stanley Hayard, Chief Superintendent, Metropolitan Police.
- Joseph Robert Hazard, B.E.M., lately Driver, Government Car Service, Property ServicesAgency.
- Vera Grace, Mrs. Head. For political service.
- Matthew Arnold Hepworth, lately Senior Manager, T and N Technology Ltd.
- Anthony Hewitt. For services to Sidecar Racing.
- Anthony Hewitt, Chief Executive, British Coal Enterprise Ltd.
- Miss Marjorie Constance Hill. For services to the Arts in Liverpool.
- Peter Alfred Leonard Hillman, Vice-President, Dudley District Branch, Soldiers', Sailors' and Airmen's Families Association.
- Patricia Daphne, Mrs. Hinson, Secretary to the Chief Executive, Bedfordshire County Council and the Lord Lieutenant, Bedfordshire.
- John Stanley Hogarth, Senior Shift Engineer, British Sidac Ltd, Wigton, Cumbria.
- Glenda Evelyn, Mrs. Hogarth-Coull, Managing Director, Hogarth Safetywear Ltd, Aberdeen.
- Carol Ann, Lady Holland. For services to Arthritis Care. Lately Editor, Arthritis News.
- Harry Esmond Houghton, Executive Officer, Board of H.M. Customs and Excise.
- Henry David Howard, Senior Scientific Officer, Home Office.
- Ian Howden-Simpson, Senior Executive Officer, Department of Trade and Industry.
- Charles Edward Hughes. For services to Sport for young people in St Asaph, Clwyd.
- Tom Hume, Chairman and Allotments Consultant, London Association of Recreational Gardeners.
- Miss Susan Humphreys, Head of Infant Department, St George's Primary School, Wallasey, Merseyside.
- Felicia Dolores, Mrs. Hutchinson, Senior Medical Officer, London Brook Advisory Centres.
- David Geoffrey Ibbs, Chief Superintendent, West Midlands Police.
- Colin Ray Jackson. For services to Athletics.
- Margaret Lavis, Mrs. Jackson. For political and public service.
- Miss Sybil Elsie Jackson, Revenue Executive, Board of Inland Revenue.
- Miss Jessica Mary Jacob, Sole Practitioner, Scott Raymont.
- Richard Thomas James, Chairman, Gwent and Powys War Pensions' Committee.
- Leonard Alfred Jeacocke. For services to the Bomb Disposal Branch, Royal Engineers Association.
- Moira Audrey Coates, Mrs. Jeffcoat. For political and public service.
- Collins, Mrs. Jefferson, lately Forensic Medical Officer. For services to the Mentally Handicapped.
- Ronald Herbert Jefferys, lately Principal Building Surveyor, Commission for the New Towns.
- Hilda Kathleen, Mrs. Johnson. For services to the community in Hampshire.
- John Edward Jones. For political service.
- James Herbert Frederick Jones, lately Resident Civil Engineer, Thetford Bypass (All), G Maunsell & Partners.
- Marian, Mrs. Jones. For political and public service.
- Philip Joy, Chairman, Wirral Southern Community Health Council.
- Joan, Mrs. Kean, Project Director, Newcastle Architecture Workshop.
- John Granville Kearton, Senior Marketing Programme and Project Manager, Foden Trucks, Sandbach.
- Ronald Alfred George Keen, Operations Manager, London Regional Transport.
- James Michael Kent, Technology Manager, Power Systems Division, Lucas Aerospace Ltd.
- Peter Charles Kingsley, Executive Officer, Superintending Clerk, House of Commons.
- Miss Valerie Lang, Vice-Chairman, Spastics Society. For services to disabled persons' transport.
- Kathleen Elizabeth, Mrs. Laurence-Smith, lately Case Secretary, Auxiliary Territorial Service and Women's Royal Army Corps Benevolent Funds.
- Ivy Alice, Mrs. Lee. For services to London North West Branch, Soldiers', Sailors' and Airmen's Families Association.
- Beatrice Elizabeth, Mrs. Lees. For political and public service.
- Betty Evelyn, Mrs. Le Masurier. President, Guernsey Branch, British Red Cross Society.
- John Kenneth Lever. For services to Cricket.
- Rene Henri Liron, Secretary, Jersey Transport and General Workers' Union.
- William McArtney Livingston, Assistant Secretary, Convention of Scottish Local Authorities.
- Miss Mona Emily Caroline Lloyd, Conductor, The Renshaw Orchestra. Founder, The Waterloo Park Orchestra, Liverpool.
- Joseph Locke, Managing Director, R. Watson and Company, Bolton.
- Sheila Maria, Mrs. Lockyer, Chief Typing Manager, Board of Inland Revenue.
- Miss Marjorie Helen Lofthouse (Mrs. Stephinson), Freelance Broadcaster.
- Barbara Noel, Mrs. Lyndon Skeggs, D.L., Vice-Chairman, Northumberland District Health Authority.
- Neil Macpherson, lately Senior Personnel Officer, Ferranti Defence Systems Ltd.
- Hilda, Mrs. Marples, Professor of Speech, Drama and Public Speaking, Manchester School of Music.
- Charles Granville Marshall, lately Chief Officer, Inspectorate, Royal Society for Prevention of Cruelty to Animals.
- William Martin, Senior Health Physicist, Ministry of Defence.
- Malcolm Mason, Assistant Divisional Officer, Gwynedd Fire Service.
- Audrey Wheeler, Mrs. Mathieson, Senior Executive Officer, Department of Employment.
- Mary, Mrs. Mattey, lately Regional Secretary, North West, Royal Institute of British Architects.
- Vincent James McConnell, lately Area Manager, Automobile Association, Northern Ireland.
- Miss Kathleen McGenity, lately Director of Nursing Services, Arrowe Park Hospital, Wirral Health Authority.
- Michael McGinley, Health & Safety officer. For services to Health and Safety in the United Kingdom.
- Helen, Mrs. McGregor. For services to the Housing Association Movement, Scotland.
- Thomas McKeown, Higher Professional and Technology Officer, Department of Agriculture, Northern Ireland.
- Malcolm McLaren, Ministry of Defence. Senior Scientific Officer,
- Hugh Campbell McMullan, Chairman, Industrial Therapy Organisation (Ulster) Ltd.
- Major John Denis McNeil. For services to the Army Cadet League.
- Peter John Meakin, B.E.M., Chief Commandant, Merseyside Special Constabulary.
- George Mighty. For services to the community in Derby.
- John Frederick David Mills, lately Environment Adviser, ICI Chemicals and Polymers Ltd.
- John David Millward, Head of Research, Rank Cintel Ltd.
- Miss Diana Hunter Moody. For political and public service.
- Alan Mordain, Chairman, Quality Software Products Ltd. For services to Export.
- Pamela June, Mrs. Morley Peet, Senior Nurse, Control of Infection, North East Essex.
- Edith, Mrs. Mortimer, Member, Grange-Over- Sands Town Council, Cumbria.
- Geoffrey Morton, Farmer, Yorkshire.
- Dennis Walter John (Danny) Moss, Tenor Saxophonist.
- John Nelson, T.D., D.L., Convener, Stewartry District Council.
- David John Nicell, Edinburgh Area Manager, Fairclough, Scotland Ltd.
- Benjamin William Stuart Nuttall, Chairman and Chief Executive, Biwater Industries Ltd.
- Miss Hazel Eileen Orchard, lately Assistant Director, Continuing Education, Royal Society of Arts Examinations Board.
- Godfrey David Weatherburn Page, Farmer, Westerham. For services to conservation.
- Marie Frances, Mrs. Pantry, Cumbria County Organiser, Women's Royal Voluntary Service.
- Dorothy Eileen, Mrs. Parry, Founder, Campaign for Tackling Acquired Deafness.
- Victor Philip Parsons, Managing Director, Wandel and Goltermann Ltd.
- Fenwick Albert Patterson, Director of Housing and Environmental Health, Hartlepool Borough Council.
- Edward Alan Pearce, Chairman, Cornwall Committee for the Employment of Disabled People.
- Raymond John Pepworth, lately Inspector of Taxes, Board of Inland Revenue.
- Dennis Brian Perkins, Education Welfare Officer, Waltham Forest, London.
- John Plackett, Force Administrative Officer, Nottingham Constabulary.
- Alan Victor Plant, lately Colliery General Manager, Florence Colliery, North West Group, British Coal Corporation.
- Lawrence Porter, Chief Ambulance Officer, Gwent Health Authority.
- Robert John Poynter, Deputy General Manager, Western Region, British Railways. Autistic Society.
- Gerald Philip Price, Member, West Midlands Autistic Society.
- Brent Pyburn, Manager, Environmental Response, British Petroleum International.
- Clifford Quick. For services to the community in Great Torrington.
- Miss Belinda Margaret Quirey, Choreographer. For services to Dance.
- Henry Maurice Rapport, Voluntary Clinical Assistant, Marie Curie Hospice, Penarth, South Glamorgan.
- Leonard Ratoff, lately Principal in General Practice, Liverpool.
- John Dilwyn Rees, Headteacher, Heol-y-Celyn Bi- lingual Primary School, Pontypridd, Mid Glamorgan.
- Mabel, Mrs. Rees, Founder, LATCH (Llandough Aims to Treat Children with Cancer and Leukaemia with Hope).
- Jack Render, Founder member, Worcester Cancer Support Group.
- Eirian Oweena Seaborn, Mrs. Ricketts, Superintendent I Physiotherapist, Mental Health Care, Whitchurch Hospital, South Glamorgan Health Authority.
- Raymond Lewis Rivett, Credit Comptroller, Perkins Engines Ltd.
- Philip John Rogers, Optics Group Manager and Chief Optical Designer, Pilkington Optronics.
- Marjorie Constance, Mrs. Rosenthal, Executive Officer, Department of Transport.
- William Roy, Chairman, Non-Executive, John Millar and Sons (1844) Ltd, Broxbourn.
- Dorothy Pamela, Mrs. Rumfitt (Miss Pouncey), lately Secretary, Disaster Emergency Committee (overseas disaster relief).
- Anthony John Saich, Partner, Manning Hilder and Girling Chartered Accountants.
- John Duncan Salmon. For services to the Fishing Industry.
- Cathleen Phyllis, Mrs. Sampson, lately Regional Gypsy Liaison Officer, East Anglian Regional Health Authority.
- Betty, Mrs. Sansome, Senior Welfare Officer, PowerGen pic.
- Miss Pamela Helen Schwerdt. Gardener, National Trust, Sissinghurst Castle Garden.
- Leslie Clifford Scott . For services to the 2nd Searchlight Regiment, Royal Artillery Reunion Association.
- Peter Michael Scudamore. For services to National Hunt Racing.
- Cyril Roger Segelov, Headteacher, Glyncorrwg Primary School, West Glamorgan, Leader of Friendship House Gateway Club, Swansea.
- Eric Shaw, Photographer, The Press Association Ltd.
- George Suttie Shepherd, Editor, Arbroath Herald and the Braemar Gathering Book and Scottish Annual.
- Derek Mann Shrigley. For political service.
- Miss Heather Catherine Simpson, Sister-in-Charge, Vascular Unit, Royal Infirmary, Edinburgh, Lothian Health Board.
- Surrindar Singh, Executive Officer, Board of H.M. Customs and Excise.
- Barbara Thelma, Mrs. Slade, Community Nurse Team Manager, Hull Health Authority.
- Roger William Smedley, Chairman, SAC International pic.
- Edward Herbert Smith, Conservation Officer, Royal Armouries, Tower of London.
- Roy Frank Smith. For services to Sport for the Disabled.
- William Joseph Smith, Executive Officer, Ministry of Defence.
- Dinah Gilmour, Mrs. Snow, Assistant Director of Nursing, Forth Valley Health Board.
- Peter Cyril Spencer. For services to the community in Northamptonshire.
- Walter John Spreull, Director and General Manager, St Albans Sand and Gravel Company Ltd. For services to Environmental Conservation.
- Alexander Gerald Piers Stanford. For political service.
- Barbara, Mrs. Starmer. For services to the community in Leicestershire.
- Peter John Stead, Inspector, North Yorkshire Police.
- Josephine, Mrs. Stebbing. For political and public service.
- Alan Stewart, Deputy General Manager, Newcastle upon Tyne Family Practitioners' Committee.
- Donald Mclntyre Stewart. For politica lservice.
- Geoffrey Frederick Stokes, lately Works and Senior Site Manager; Synthetic Paper Division, BXL Plastics Ltd.
- Denis William Stokoe. For political service.
- Bernard James Sullivan. Toastmaster, Corporation and City of London.
- George Edward Templeton, Northern Ireland Regional Manager, Royal Society for the Prevention of Accidents.
- John James Templeton, Dairy and Livestock Farmer, Sheep Dog Expert.
- Dennis William Temporal, Football Liaison Inspector, British Transport Police.
- John Edwin Derek Thomas, Senior Executive Officer, Department of Social Security.
- John Thomson, Director, Voluntary Association for Mental Welfare, Motherwell and Wishaw Branch.
- Violet Elizabeth, Mrs. Thornton, Fermanagh District Manager, Northern Ireland Housing Executive.
- Arthur James Tillett, Vice-Chairman, Management Committee, Norwich Unit, Sea Cadet Corps.
- Alan Francis Todd, Governor, British Society for Horticultural Research.
- George Herbert Traves, President, National Federation of Fishermen's Organisations.
- Ronald Hugh Tridgell, Consultant, Signalling Standards, Department of Trade and Industry.
- Charles Leslie Tuley, Senior Public Relations Officer, British Nuclear Fuels pic.
- Leonard Arthur Turner, Managing Director, Red Sea Lights Co. Ltd.
- Elisabeth Ann, Mrs. Turvill. For political service.
- John Ross Urquhart, Managing Director, John Ross Chemicals Ltd.
- Mrs. Elizabeth Rhoda Wakefield, Honorary Vice-President, Highland Division, Scottish Community Drama Association.
- Elsie Charmaine, Mrs. Walker, District Nursing Sister, Hounslow and Spelthorne Health Authority.
- Miss Doreen Waterhouse, General Manager, Wigan and BillingeHospitals and District Medical Services, Wigan Health Authority.
- Kathleen May, Mrs. Watts. For services to the community in Bedfordshire.
- Reverend Christian Oliver Weaver. For services to the community in Nottingham.
- Stephen Webster. For services to Sidecar Racing.
- Betty, Ivy, Mrs. Weston. For services to the Alexandra Rose Day Charity.
- Sidney Edward White, Head Technician, Earth and Life Sciences Workshops, Royal Holloway and Bedford New College.
- Miss Patricia Oldrini Whitt, Secretary to the Vice-Chancellor, University of East Anglia.
- Geoffrey Alan Whyley, Principal Medical Laboratory Scientific Officer, University College, London.
- Miss Clodagh Patricia Wilkinson, Ministry of Defence.
- George Eric Willcock, County Emergency Planning Officer, Kent County Council.
- Miss Margaret Anne Willett County Director, Age Concern, Devon.
- Joyce Lilian, Mrs. Williams, Executive Officer, Department of Education and Science.
- Marian Elizabeth, Mrs. Williams, Executive Officer, Training Agency, Department of Employment.
- John Stephenson Willis, Company Director, Electro Acoustic Industries Ltd, Bridgend, Mid Glamorgan.
- Alan James Wiltshire, lately Valuer, Board of Inland Revenue.
- Robin David Winch, Former General Medical Practitioner, East London.
- Daniel Whitelaw Wright, Managing Director, Ross Chemicals Ltd.
- Sidney Edward White, Head Technician, Earth and Life Sciences Workshops, Royal Holloway and Bedford New College.
- Miss Patricia Oldrini Whitt, Secretary to the Vice-Chancellor, University of East Anglia.
- Geoffrey Alan Whyley, Principal Medical Laboratory Scientific Officer, University College, London.
- Miss Clodagh Patricia Wilkinson, Ministry of Defence.
- George Eric Willcock, County Emergency Planning Officer, Kent County Council.
- Miss Margaret Anne Willett, County Director, Age Concern, Devon.
- Joyce Lilian, Mrs. Williams, Executive Officer, Department of Education and Science.
- Marian Elizabeth, Mrs. Williams, Executive Officer, Training Agency, Department of Employment.
- John Stephenson Willis, Company Director, Electro Acoustic Industries Ltd, Bridgend, Mid Glamorgan.
- Alan James Wiltshire, lately Valuer, Board of Inland Revenue.
- Robin David Winch, Former General Medical Practitioner, East London.
- Daniel Whitelaw Wright, Managing Director, Fleming Thermodynamics, Clydebank, Glasgow

== Australia ==
=== Member of the Order of Australia (AM) ===
- Dr Douglas Hardy - For service to medicine.

== Mauritius ==
=== Knight Bachelor ===
- Mookteswar Baboolall Kailash Ramdanee. For services to trade and industry

=== Order of the British Empire ===
==== Commander of the Order of the British Empire (CBE) ====
- Eddie Tseng-Yung Lu. For services to industry.

==== Officer of the Order of the British Empire (OBE) ====
- Dr. Jasraj Bhageerutty. For services to public health.
- Paul Roland Maurel. For services to industry.
- Vadivel Moothoosamy. For services to the community.
- Mooneelall Ramphul. For services to the community.
- Ananrow Sonoo. For services to the community.
- Rohitsing Unnuth. For public service.

==== Member of the Order of the British Empire (MBE) ====
- Harrychand Baldeo. For services to the community.
- Vadivelloo Kadarasen. For services to photography.
- Hajee Ahmad Nowbuth. For services to the community.
- Emmanuel Frantz Prodano. For public service.

=== Imperial Service Order (ISO) ===
- Krishnasamy Varaden, lately Postmaster-General

=== Mauritius Police Medal ===
- Vedanand Reesaul, Superintendent of Police.
- Mohamad Rashid Jahmeerbacus, Assistant Superintendent of Police.
- Joseph Ignace Guy Sandoo, Police Sergeant.
- Octave Francis Noyan, Police Constable.

== Bahamas ==
=== Order of Saint Michael and Saint George ===
==== Companion of the Order of St Michael and St George (CMG) ====
- Beltron Benjamin Bethel, Director General of Tourism.
- Herbert Cleveland Walkine, Secretary to the Cabinet and Head of the Public Service.

=== Order of the British Empire ===
==== Officer of the Order of the British Empire (OBE) ====
- Ethlyn Cynthia, Mrs. Isaacs. For public service.

==== Member of the Order of the British Empire (MBE) ====
- Ruth Carmel, Mrs. Boyd. For public service.
- Cecil Philip Wallace. For services to the community.

==== British Empire Medal (BEM) ====
- George Bannister. For public service.
- Willard Henry Dorsett. For public service.
- Norman Duncombe. For public service.

== Grenada ==
=== Order of the British Empire ===
==== Dame Commander of the Order of the British Empire (DBE) ====
- Venetia Ursula, Mrs. Blaize. For services to the community.

==== Officer of the Order of the British Empire (OBE) ====
- Patrick Bubb, Comptroller of Customs and Excise.

==== British Empire Medal (BEM) ====
- Junior Emmanuel James. For public service.

== Papua New Guinea ==
=== Order of Saint Michael and Saint George ===
==== Knight Grand Cross of the Order of St Michael and St George (GCMG) ====
- The Right Honourable Thomas Somare, C.H., M.P. For political services.

==== Companion of the Order of St Michael and St George (CMG) ====
- The Honourable Tony Ila, M.P. For political services and services to the community.
- The Honourable Martin Tovadek. For political services and services to the community.

=== Order of the British Empire ===
==== Dame Commander of the Order of the British Empire (DBE) ====
- Miss Josephine Abajiah. For services to the community.

==== Knight Commander of the Order of the British Empire (KBE) ====
- Anthony Michael Siagaru. For services to the community.

==== Commander of the Order of the British Empire (CBE) ====
Military Division

- Colonel Lima Dotanoa, O.B.E. For service to the Papua New Guinea Defence Force.

Civil Division

- Paul Bosco Yuck Leong Ning, M.B.E. For services to the community.
- Vai Reva. For services to banking.
- William Searson, Secretary, Department of Minerals and Energy.

==== Officer of the Order of the British Empire (OBE) ====
Military Division

Colonel David Leo Yanaimas Takendu. For service to the Papua New Guinea Defence Force.

Civil Division

- The Hon. Raphael Bele, M.P. For political services.
- William Conrad Dihm, Secretary, Department of Foreign Affairs.
- Keith Charles Gill. For services to the community.
- Girvan Ross Hornbrook, M.B.E., B.E.M. For public service.
- William Horsley. For services to commerce and the community.
- William Agaru Lawrence. For services to commerce
- Charles Lepani. For public service.
- William Campbell McLellan. For services to the community.
- Jack Pidik, B.E.M. For services to sport and the community.
- Jeremiah Emaus Tetaga. Secretary, Department of Education.
- Kipling Uiari. For services to mining.
- The Hon. Lucas Waka, M.P. For political services.

==== Member of the Order of the British Empire (MBE) ====
Military Division

- Major Jerry Singarok. For service to the Papua New Guinea Defence Force.
- Captain Herman Atip Tauanlogo. For service to the Papua New Guinea Defence Force.
- Major Willy Karai Wagera. For service to the Papua New Guinea Defence Force.

Civil Division

- Oliver Aegit. For services to local government.
- Geoffrey Baskett. For services to the community.
- Dennis Bradney. For services to sport.
- Olive, Mrs Close. For services to education.
- Paiele Elo. For public service.
- David Ross Hamilton. For services to medicine.
- Tuakana John. For services to the community.
- Francis Kabano. For public service.
- William Nakin. For public service.
- Manu Paul. For public service.
- Minson Longogan Peni. For service to civil aviation.
- Roseva Rovela. For services to local government.
- Susana, Mrs Setae. For services to the community.
- The Reverend John Naho Sikolai. For services to the Royal Papua New Guinea Constabulary.
- Raymond James Stewart. For services to sport.
- Albert Edmund Tame. For services to the community.
- Gena, Mrs Tau. For services to sport.
- Mahuru Dadi Toka. For services to the community.
- Senior Inspector Epraim Tomonmon. For services to the Royal Papua New Guinea Constabulary.
- Ben Topikul. Fo services to the community.
- Assistant Commissioner Oda Vagi Toua. For public service.
- Tamarua Trudi. For service to civil aviation.

==== British Empire Medal (BEM) ====
Military Division

- 83245 Sergeant Jerry Ejirpoa. For service to the Papua New Guinea Defence Force.
- 85324 Sergeant Divina John Malaga. For service to the Papua New Guinea Defence Force.
- 81810 Private Senega Nubevo. For service to the Papua New Guinea Defence Force.
- 84768 Sergeant Charles Ronnie. For service to the Papua New Guinea Defence Force.
- 85003 Sergeant Peter Tepo. For service to the Papua New Guinea Defence Force.

Civil Division

- Ame Bote. For services to public health.
- Alquin Bueba. For services to public health.
- Maine, Mrs Dum. For services to public health.
- Senior Sergeant Kora Kapuna Hovovas. For services to the Royal Papua New Guinea Constabulary.
- Kaki Iagira. For services to public health.
- Senior Sergeant Bobon Ialabain. For services to the Royal Papua New Guinea Constabulary.
- Senior Constable Kelewan Kamies. For services to the Royal Papua New Guinea Constabulary.
- Sergeant-Major Stanley Libai. For services to the Royal Papua New Guinea Constabulary.
- Senior Sergeant Peter Livicha. For services to the Royal Papua New Guinea Constabulary.
- Gavera Madaha. For public service.
- Keai Miru. For public service.
- Danga Mondo. For service sto local government.
- Pung Nimp. For public service.
- Edward Pitili. For service to the community.
- Warrant Officer Willie Seph. For public service.
- Marlene Andrea, Mrs Abdellaoui-Tyrell. For public service.
- Maita Wamala. For public service.
- First Constable Walo Yaravi. For services to the Royal Papua New Guinea Constabulary.

=== Imperial Service Order (ISO) ===
- Alan O'Aisa. For public service.
- Momo Rabura. For public service.

=== Queen's Police Medal (QPM) ===
- Superintendent Albert Mula. Royal Papua New Guinea Constabulary.
- Chief Inspector Luke Pangou. Royal Papua New Guinea Constabulary.
- Superintendent Anthony Wagambie. Royal Papua New Guinea Constabulary.

== Solomon Islands ==
=== Order of Saint Michael and Saint George ===
==== Companion of the Order of St Michael and St George (CMG) ====
- Wilson Ifunaoa. For public service.

=== Order of the British Empire ===
==== Member of the Order of the British Empire (MBE) ====
- Paul Baekalia. For public service.

=== Queen's Police Medal (QPM) ===
- John Matita, Deputy Commissioner, Royal Solomon Islands Police.
- James Nihopara, C.P.M., Chief Superintendent, Royal Solomon Islands Police.

== Tuvalu ==
=== Order of the British Empire ===
==== Officer of the Order of the British Empire (OBE) ====
- The Honourable Tomu Sione. For services to the community.

==== Member of the Order of the British Empire (MBE) ====
- Semu Sopoaga Taafaki. For public service.
- Saloa Tauia. For public service.

==== British Empire Medal (BEM) ====
- Salaikeni Apelu. For public service.
- Uinitelo Esela. For public service.
- Tinilau Lomi. For services to the community.
- Palaamo Nielu. For public service.
- Natano Setema. For services to the community.
- Falefaea Tapu. For services to the community.
- Mita Telaki. For services to the community.

== Saint Lucia ==
=== Order of Saint Michael and Saint George ===
==== Companion of the Order of St Michael and St George (CMG) ====
- Stanislaus Anthony James, O.B.E., Acting Governor-General.

=== Order of the British Empire ===
==== Member of the Order of the British Empire (MBE) ====
- Dunstan Emmanuel Stephen Du Boulay. For public service.

== Saint Vincent and The Grenadines ==
=== Order of the British Empire ===
==== Officer of the Order of the British Empire (OBE) ====
- Calvin Fitzroy Nicholls. For public service.

== Belize ==
=== Order of the British Empire ===
==== Member of the Order of the British Empire (MBE) ====
- Henry Charles Usher. For services to the community.

== Antigua and Barbuda ==
=== Order of the British Empire ===
==== Member of the Order of the British Empire (MBE) ====
- Heron Roy Carlisle Edwards. For public service.
