= Newhouse Academy =

Location
- Newhouse Road; Heywood, Greater Manchester, OL10 2NT; England; 53°34′57″N 2°13′01″W

Information
- Type: Academy
- Established: 1968
- Local authority: Rochdale
- Trust: Hollingworth Learning Trust
- Department for Education URN: 147875 Tables
- Ofsted: Reports
- Headteacher: Alex Burnham
- Gender: Coeducational
- Age: 11 to 16
- Website: https://newhouseacademy.co.uk/

Newhouse Academy is a coeducational secondary school located in Heywood, Greater Manchester, England.

== History ==
Siddal Moor School opened in September 1968. It was formed from Heywood Grammar School and the Bamford Road and Hornby Street secondary modern schools. It was originally to be the new site of the grammar school. The former site of the grammar school on Hind Hill Street became the Hind Hill Centre. It was demolished in 2006 and is now the Phoenix Centre.

As part of the specialist schools programmes, Siddal Moor School was awarded Sports College status and was renamed Siddal Moor Sports College.

The school was allocated money for the refurbishment and rebuild. The project included a new building at the front for teaching and administration with the rest of the school being refurbished. The project was finished in 2011.

Previously a community school administered by Rochdale Metropolitan Borough Council, in April 2020 Siddal Moor Sports College converted to academy status and was renamed Newhouse Academy. The school is now sponsored by the Hollingworth Learning Trust.

== Notable former pupils ==
=== Siddal Moor Sports College ===
- Nico Mirallegro, actor.
- Ryan Tunnicliffe, footballer

=== Siddal Moor School ===
- Lisa Stansfield, singer and actress
- David Martin Makin, co-founder of JD Sports
- Tennant, event organiser/producer of Tribal Gathering and other Universe raves in the 1990s

=== Heywood Grammar School ===
- John Abrahams, former captain of Lancashire Cricket Club
- George Bellairs (Harold Blundell), author
- Charles Booth CMG LVO, Ambassador to Burma from 1978–82 and High Commissioner from 1982-85 to Malta
- Pamela Bowden , contralto, and former President of the Incorporated Society of Musicians
- David Cross, striker for West Ham in the 1970s
- Air Chief Marshal Sir Malcolm Pledger OBE AFC, Station Commander from 1990-92 of RAF Shawbury, and Chief of Defence Logistics from 2002–04
- Lister Tonge, Dean of Monmouth since 2012
- Wilfred Turner CMG CVO, High Commissioner to Botswana from 1977–81
- John Welsby CBE, the last Chief Executive from 1990-96 of the British Railways Board, and President from 1999-2002 of the CILT
