= David Merry =

British diplomat

David Byron Merry, CMG (born 16 September 1945) was High Commissioner to Botswana from 2001

He was at the Ministry of Aviation from 1961 to 1965 when he entered the HM Diplomatic Service. He served in Bangkok, Budapest, Bonn, East Berlin, Manila and Karachi before his Gaborone appointment.
