= Gandee =

Gandee is a surname. Notable people with the surname include:

- John Gandee (1909–1994), British diplomat, High Commissioner to Botswana
- Sonny Gandee (1929–2013), American football player

== See also ==
- Gandy (surname)
- Gandhi (surname)
