= Wilfred Turner =

British diplomat

Wilfred Turner CMG, (10 October 1921 – 26 June 2015) was a British diplomat in the second half of the Twentieth century.

He was educated at Heywood Grammar School and the University of London. He was with the Ministry of Labour from 1938 to 1942 when he was recruited by C. P. Snow as a Radar Maintenance Officer. He served in the Second World War as a captain in REME- and was on the staff of the 13th Infantry Brigade from 1945 to 1947 when he went back to the Ministry of Labour. He was Senior Wages Inspector there from 1959 to 1960. He was the Principal at the Hospitals Division at the Ministry of Health from 1960 to 1966, during which time he drafted the report recommending standardisation of hospital medical records. He also designed and introduced the Yellow Card system for reporting adverse reactions to medicines. He joined the HM Diplomatic Service in 1966. He was Head of Chancery at Kaduna until 1969; then at Kuala Lumpur until 1973; and Deputy High Commissioner at Accra until 1977 at which point he was made Companion in the Order of St Michael and St George (CMG). He was High Commissioner to Botswana from 1977 to 1981.
