= Robert Shields (surgeon) =

British surgeon and Professor of Surgery

Sir Robert Shields DL (8 May 1930 – 3 October 2008) was a British surgeon and Professor of Surgery at Liverpool University.

He was born in Paisley, Renfrewshire, the son of an electrical engineer. He was educated at the John Neilson Institution, Paisley and Glasgow University.

He took a job as a house officer at Glasgow Western Infirmary and then carried out his National (Military) Service as regimental medical officer with the Argyll and Sutherland Highlanders. He maintained his association with the Army until 1962 by serving as senior surgical specialist and medical officer with the 7th Battalion, the Argylls (TA Reserve).

After completion of his National Service in 1956, he returned to the Western Infirmary and rose steadily up through the ranks, moving in 1963 to Cardiff as senior lecturer in surgery at the Welsh National School of Medicine and consultant surgeon to the United Cardiff Hospitals and the Welsh Hospital Board. He was awarded his MD in 1965 for his paper on intestinal absorption and appointed Reader in 1969.

Later in that year of 1969, he was offered and accepted the post as Professor of Surgery at Liverpool University (with a consultant post at the Royal Liverpool and Broadgreen hospitals), where he worked until his retirement. During those 30 years Shields built up the department of surgery and established an international reputation for research, teaching and clinical practice.

In 1982 he was appointed dean of the medical faculty at Liverpool University for 3 years. He also served on a number of medical committees and the editorial boards of various learned journals; he was vice-chairman of the British Journal of Surgery. He was joint editor of a number of books on medical subjects, including the Textbook of Surgery (1983).

He was knighted in the 1990 Birthday Honours and made a Deputy-lieutenant of Merseyside in 1991. In 1994 he was elected to serve as president of the Royal College of Surgeons of Edinburgh for the next 3 years. After retirement he acted as an advisor to Government on Health Service reform.

He died in 2008. He had married in 1957 Marianne Swinburne, a nursing sister at the British Military Hospital in Berlin. He left a son and 2 daughters.
