= Alastair Morton =

Chief Executive of Eurotunnel (1938-2004)

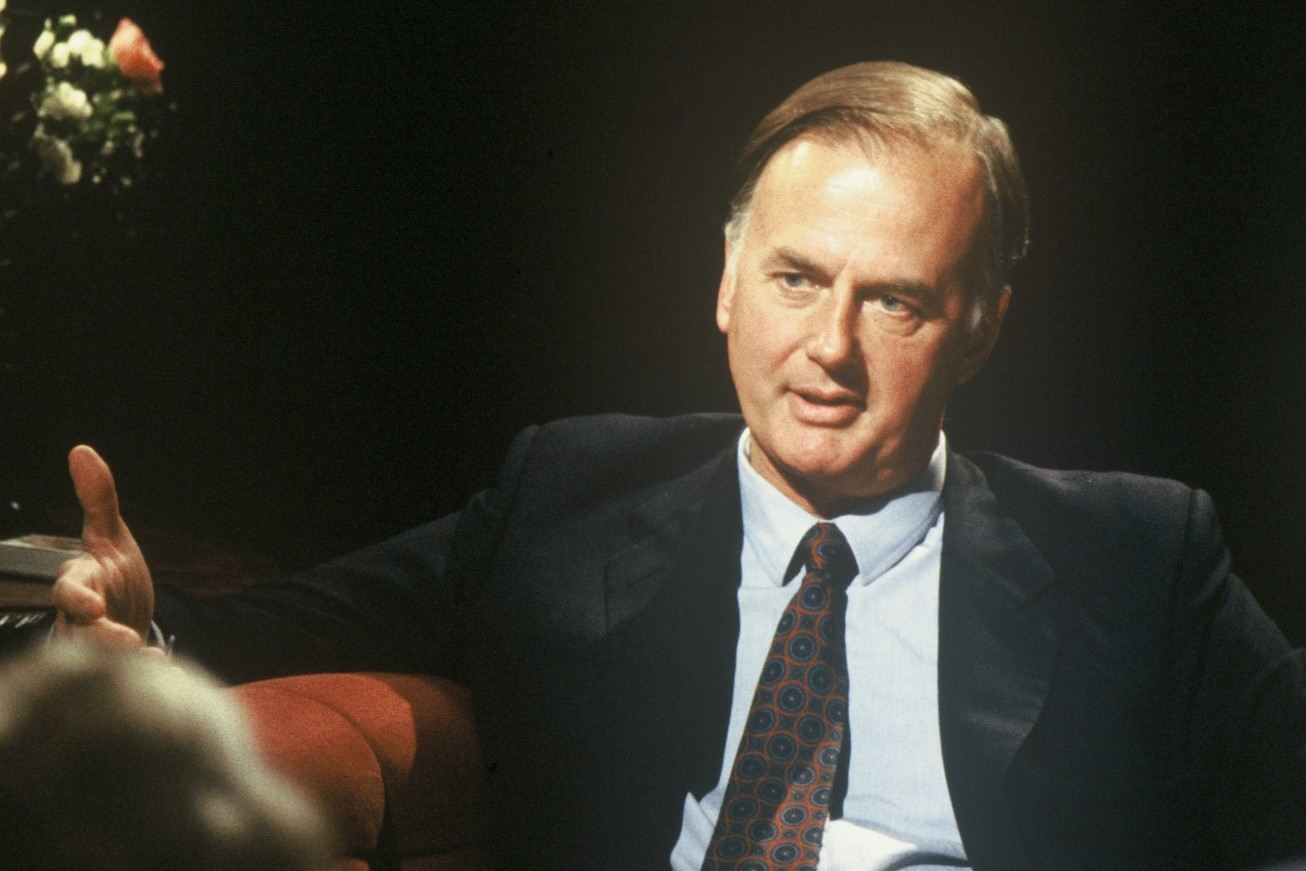
Appearing on television discussion After Dark "Britain – Out on a Limb?" in 1989

Sir Robert Alastair Newton Morton (11 January 1938 – 1 September 2004) was Chief Executive of Eurotunnel and Chairman of the Strategic Rail Authority, industrialist and the last chairman of the British Railways Board.

== Early life ==
Morton was born 11 January 1938 in Johannesburg, South Africa. The son of a Scottish oil engineer father and an Afrikaner mother. Morton was educated at St John's College in Johannesburg and at Witwatersrand University, but came to Britain to read law at Worcester College, Oxford, as a De Beers scholar and remained in England for the rest of his life, although he did spend some time back in Africa and also with the World Bank in Washington. He was managing director of the British National Oil Corporation 1976–80; as the managing director, he fought to resist privatisation. He was chief executive of Guinness Peat Group 1982–87 and chairman in 1987. In 1993 he chaired the United Kingdom Treasury's private finance panel, which sought private capital for transport projects.

== Eurotunnel ==
Morton was appointed co-chairman of Eurotunnel in 1987, a position he would hold until 1996. The project cost more than twice its projected £4.8 billion price tag. The Conservative Government of Margaret Thatcher had insisted that the project had to pay its own way, and the UK legislation which authorised and facilitated the project contained an outright ban on any British public subsidy for the works. In 1990 he became the group chief executive 1990–94.

== Strategic Rail Authority ==
In 1999, deputy prime minister John Prescott appointed Morton to the chairmanship of the British Railways Board and, once created from February 2001, the Strategic Rail Authority, from which he resigned in October 2001 in the aftermath of the collapse of Railtrack. Morton famously coined the phrase that the aftermath of the Hatfield rail crash constituted a 'collective nervous breakdown' on the part of the British railway industry.

The Authority had been created for ambiguous political reasons, with considerable political and public expectations vested in it but without nearly the power to meet them. Relations with the Department for Transport, the Treasury and the Rail Regulator - which collectively did have the powers which Morton wanted - deteriorated quite quickly.

Towards the end of his time at the SRA, Morton was making public statements which were more and more critical of his political masters and what he saw as their intransigence in allowing him both the power and the freedom he believed he should have had. In relation to powers to hold Railtrack - the national railway infrastructure company - to account, Morton's jurisdictional skirmishes with the Rail Regulator became public after the Ladbroke Grove rail crash and Morton would never accept that the Rail Regulator and not the SRA had the right to determine what Railtrack's financial framework and settlement should be.

Morton summed up his objections in what became his second most memorable railway phrase - 'He who pays the piper should call the tune' - by which he meant that the SRA should set the overall level of public spending on the railways, and what was to be delivered with the cash, and the Rail Regulator should simply check that the money was efficiently used. That never happened during his tenure at the SRA, although it became reality in 2005 with the passage of the Railways Act 2005 which curtailed the power of the Office of Rail Regulation (which replaced the Rail Regulator in July 2004) in financial matters. Morton resigned in October 2001.

== Private life ==
In 1990, Morton was awarded an Honorary Degree (Doctor of Laws) from the University of Bath. Morton was knighted in 1992.

== Later life ==
Morton was chairman of the National Youth Orchestra of Great Britain 1994–2004. He died on 1 September 2004 aged 66.

Business positions
Preceded by	Managing Director of the British National Oil Corporation; 1976–80	Succeeded by
Business positions
Preceded by	Co-chairman of the Eurotunnel; 1987–96	Succeeded by
Business positions
Preceded by John Welsby	Chairman of the British Railways Board; 1999–2001	Succeeded by Position Abolished
