= Peter Raftery =

British diplomat (1929–1996)

Peter Albert Raftery, CVO, MBE (8 June 1929 – 10 June 1996) was High Commissioner to Botswana from 1986 to 1989.

He was educated at St Ignatius' College, Enfield. After National Service he joined the CRO in 1949. He served in New Delhi, Cape Town, Kuala Lumpur Nairobi and Bahrain. He was First Secretary at the FCO, Head of Chancery at Gaborone; Assistant Head at the East Africa Department then Counsellor and Consul General at Amman before his Botswana appointment.
