= Pamela Bowden =

English contralto (1925–2003)

Pamela Anne Bowden (17 April 1925 – 8 April 2003 (age 78)) was an English contralto.

Bowden was born in Rochdale and was educated at Heywood Grammar School and the Royal Manchester College of Music. During World War II she was a Wren. In 1954 she won the Geneva International Music Competition. She made over 750 professional performances, retiring in 1979. After this she taught at the London College of Music and was President of the Incorporated Society of Musicians.

She was also an advocate of the music of her contemporaries, singing and recording to advantage Tippett's A Child Of Our Time, Britten's ingenuous A Charm Of Lullabies, Lennox Berkeley's tender Four Poems Of St Teresa Of Avila, and the role of Isabella in Bernard Hermann's opera Wuthering Heights. Malcolm Arnold wrote his Five William Blake Songs with Bowden in mind.

Between 1954 and 1979, when she retired, she gave more than 750 performances and/or broadcasts under conductors such as Josef Krips, Paul Sacher, Solti, Sargent, Boult, Mackerras and Boulez.

Bowden's operatic appearances were limited to some with the English Opera Group and the role of Madame Larina in Tchaikovsky's Eugene Onegin, at both Glyndebourne and Covent Garden. Her interpretation of that part, sympathetic and well-pointed as regards the text - she sang it in both Russian and English - showed what the stage lost through the infrequency of her excursions into opera.

In retirement, she had a fruitful career as a singing teacher, an administrator and adjudicator. She was also president of the Incorporated Society of Musicians.

She married the racing driver Derrick Edwards in 1960. He died in 2000: they had two children.
