= John Nunneley =

British Army officer and businessman (1922–2013)

John Hewlett Nunneley
- Born: 22 November 1922; Sydney, Australia
- Died: 27 July 2013 (aged 90)
- Education: Lawrence Sheriff School

John Hewlett Nunneley MBE (22 November 1922 – 27 July 2013) was a British Army officer and businessman. A veteran of the Burma campaign, he later worked for reconciliation between Japanese and British.

He was born in Sydney, Australia and educated at Lawrence Sheriff School, a grammar school in Rugby, Warwickshire, England.

He concealed his age to enlist in the Buffs (Royal East Kent Regiment) at 17 and was commissioned into the Somerset Light Infantry in September 1941.

He was seconded to the King's African Rifles (KAR) and mostly served with a battalion recruited from the Tanganyika Territory. He was initially based in British Somaliland where his battalion guarded Italian prisoners after the East African Campaign. He moved to Ceylon in August 1943 while attached to 25th (East African) Brigade headquarters at Kurunegala. He rejoined 36 KAR when it was posted to Ceylon and accompanied it to India and Burma. In 1944 the battalion spearheaded the advance of the Fourteenth Army down the Kabaw Valley. While in Burma he recovered a Union Jack flag that had been captured by the Japanese at Singapore in February 1942. Serving as an intelligence officer, he was wounded in the leg by a grenade on 17 October 1944.

After the war, Nunneley worked for Beaverbrook Newspapers and as a director of the British Railways Board from 1962 to 1987. As chief publicity officer, he worked as Dr Beeching's assistant on writing "The Reshaping of British Railways" report (1963).

In later life he was chairman of the Burma Campaign Fellowship Group and worked towards reconciliation between Burma veterans of Japan and the Allies. He wrote an account of his wartime experiences and of the death of a young Luo recruit Tomasi Kitinya (Thomas Liech) in Tales from the King’s African Rifles (2000). He had earlier edited Tales from the Burma Campaign 1942-45 (1998) from accounts of Japanese soldiers. In 2001 he was appointed MBE for services to UK-Japanese relations.
