= John Welsby =

British railway executive and administrator (1938–2021)

John Kay Welsby, CBE (26 May 1938 – 4 October 2021) was Chief Executive of the British Railways Board from 1990 until 1998; and its Chairman from 1995 to 1999.

Welsby was educated at Heywood Grammar School, the University of Exeter and the University of London. He was in the Government Economic Service from 1966 to 1981 when he joined the British Railways Board. He was appointed CBE in the 1990 Birthday Honours and made a Freeman of the City of London in 1992.

He died from cancer on 4 October 2021, at the age of 83.

Business positions
Preceded by Sir Bob Reid	Chairman of the British Railways Board; 1995–1999	Succeeded by Sir Alistair Morton
