= David Beaumont =

British diplomat

David Colin Baskcomb Beaumont, CB (born 16 August 1942) was High Commissioner to Botswana from 1995 to 1998.

He was educated at St Benedict's School, Ealing. He joined the CRO in 1961. He served in Nairobi, Bahrain, Accra, Kathmandu and Addis Ababa. He was Head of Protocol at the FCO from 1989 to 1994; and First Assistant Marshal of the Diplomatic Corps from 1993 to 1994.
