= Peter Parker (British businessman) =

British businessman (1924–2002)

Sir Peter Parker KBE LVO
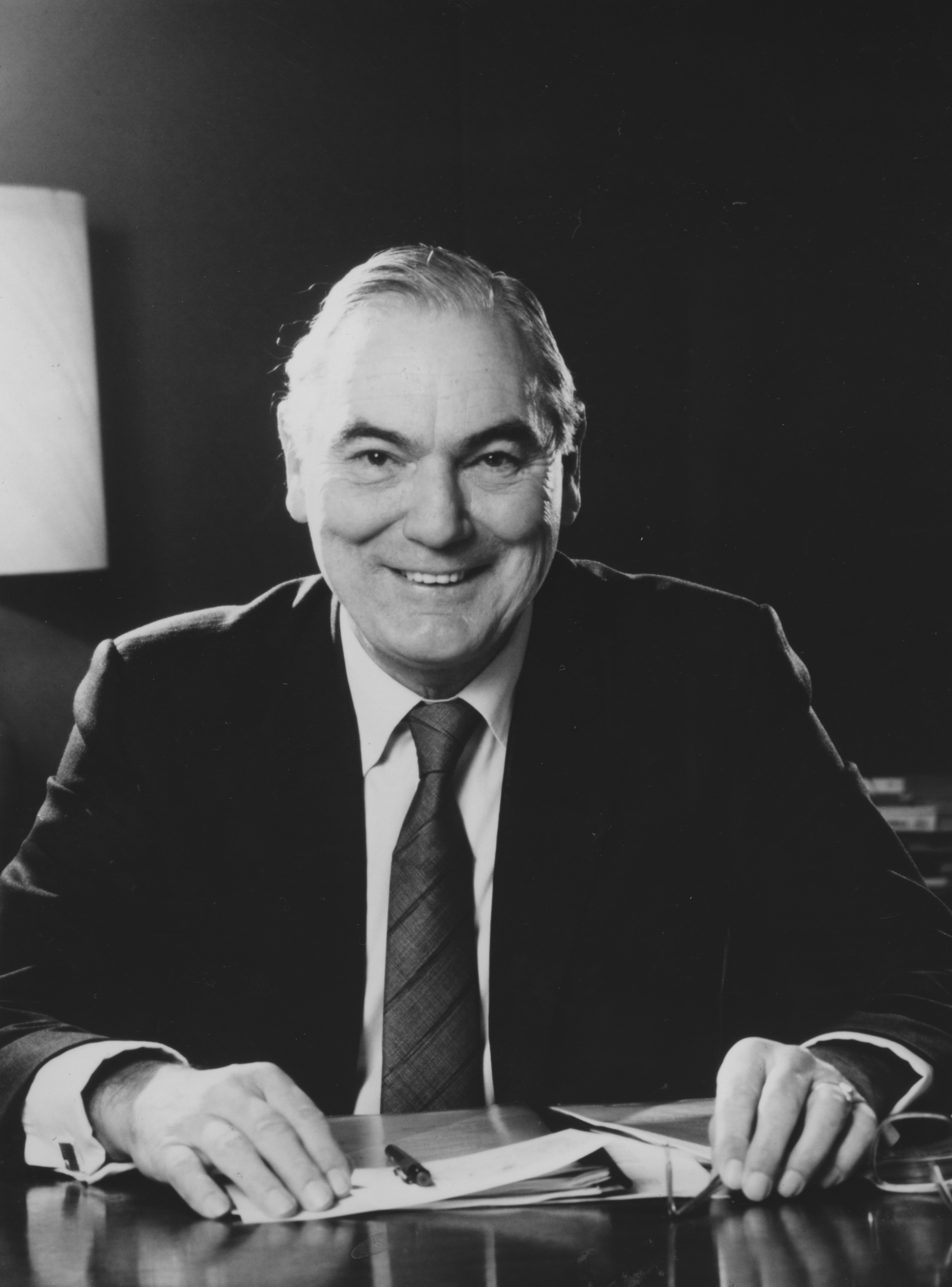
- Parker c. 1995
- Born: 30 August 1924; Dunkirk, France
- Died: 28 April 2002 (aged 77); Bodrum, Turkey
- Occupation: Businessman

Sir Peter Parker, KBE, LVO (30 August 1924 – 28 April 2002) was a British businessman and chairman of the British Railways Board from 1976 to 1983.

== Early life ==
Parker was born in France on 30 August 1924, but spent part of his childhood in Shanghai where his father worked for an oil company. The family were evacuated from China in 1937, and while his father went to work in Africa, his mother and the rest of the family settled in Bedford, England, where he attended Bedford School. After leaving school, he won a scholarship to study at the School of Oriental and African Studies, University of London, and was assigned to study Japanese. He was one of the ‘Dulwich boys’, thirty sixth-formers recruited to boost the ranks of military translators who were accommodated at Dulwich College.

In 1943 he joined the Intelligence Corps of the British Army, serving first in India and Burma, and later in the United States and Japan, eventually reaching the rank of major. In 1947 he left the army and studied history at Lincoln College, Oxford.

At Oxford he joined the Dramatic Society, where he was widely regarded as the best undergraduate actor of his day alongside contemporaries Kenneth Tynan, John Schlesinger and Lindsay Anderson. Parker met Shirley Catlin (the future Shirley Williams) in the university's Labour Party club and they had a relationship. In her autobiography (Climbing the Bookshelves) Williams says that "... by the spring of 1949 I was in love with him, and he, a little, with me ...". He stood unsuccessfully as the Labour candidate for Bedford in the 1951 general election.

== Career ==
After graduation he spent two years with Philips before becoming head of the overseas department of the Industrial Society. He organised a study conference on human problems in industry at the invitation of the Duke of Edinburgh, for which he was appointed a Lieutenant of the Royal Victorian Order in 1957. He then joined Booker McConnell, becoming a director of the company.

He remained on the board of Booker until 1970, when he was appointed chairman-designate of the newly nationalised National Ports Authority. This was scrapped following the election of the Heath Government in 1970, leaving Parker to find other directorships until his appointment in 1976 as the chairman of the British Railways Board.

=== Chairman of British Rail ===
Succeeding Sir Richard Marsh, Parker was appointed Chairman of British Rail in 1976 by the Labour Government and continued to serve during the Premiership of Margaret Thatcher. He guided the organisation through difficult times to the beginnings of the resurgence in train travel in the United Kingdom.

Politically, he was a socialist (but later joined the Social Democratic Party (SDP)). His socialist principles were severely tested by the industrial relations difficulties with the three railway unions (ASLEF, the National Union of Railwaymen and the Transport Salaried Staffs' Association) while he was Chairman of British Rail. There were several major strikes on the railway system during his chairmanship.

Parker reorganised the management of the railway system, creating five business sectors, instead of having it based on geographical regions. He was a critic of the underinvestment in the railways by successive British governments, claiming that he was trying to shore up "the crumbling edge of quality". He also campaigned vigorously against the anti-rail lobby, most notably in successfully resisting the effects of the Serpell Report into railway finances in 1982, which made no recommendations but had set out several options for a future network, some of which would have involved mass closures.

On one occasion, Parker had to catch a train from Crewe to Carlisle, but arrived late and accidentally boarded a non-stopping service heading for London Euston. Parker was succeeded in 1983 by the vice-chairman, Robert Reid.

=== Later career ===
His other appointments included the chairmanship of the Rockware Group (1971–76, and 1983–92); Bookers Engineering and Industrial Holdings (1966–70); Associated British Maltsters (1971–73); Curtis Brown (1971–76); Dawnay Day (1971–76); Mitsubishi Electric UK (1984–96); and Whitehead Mann (1984–2000). He was also chairman of the National Theatre, the British Tourist Authority and of Westfield College.

== Personal life ==
Parker married in 1951, Gillian Rowe-Dutton, daughter of Sir Ernest Rowe-Dutton; she was a GP and gardener who wrote The Purest of Pleasures: Creation of a Romantic Garden. The couple had three sons (Sir Alan Parker, public relations and former chief executive of Save the Children Fund; Oliver Parker, film director; Nathaniel Parker, the actor), and a daughter.

== Death and legacy ==
Parker died on 28 April 2002 from a suspected heart attack while on a trip to Turkey.

Parker was the first former chairman of British Rail to have an engine named in his honour. At a ceremony at Old Oak Common TMD on 17 September 2003, Class 43 power car number 43127 was named "Sir Peter Parker 1924–2002 Cotswold Line 150" by Lady Parker. The naming had been arranged between the Cotswold Line Promotion Group, which provided the nameplates, and First Great Western, to jointly celebrate Parker's life and work and the 150th anniversary of the opening of the Cotswold line between Oxford and Worcester in 1853. Parker was a regular user of Charlbury station on that line.

== Honours ==
In the 1957 Birthday Honours, Parker was appointed a Member 4th Class (in 1984 renamed as 'Lieutenant') of the Royal Victorian Order (LVO). He was knighted in the 1978 Birthday Honours, and in the 1993 Birthday Honours appointed a Knight Commander of the Order of the British Empire (KBE) for "services to public life". He was conferred with the Grand Cordon (1st Class) of the Order of the Sacred Treasure of Japan in 1991.

Business positions
Preceded by Sir Richard Marsh	Chairman of the British Railways Board; 1976–1983	Succeeded by Sir Robert Reid
