= Eleanor Emery =

British diplomat

Eleanor Emery, CMG (23 December 1918 – 22 June 2007) was High Commissioner to Botswana from 1973 to 1977: the first British woman to reach that rank.

She was born in Glasgow but educated at Western Canada High School; and the University of Glasgow. She joined the Dominions Office in 1941 and was Assistant Private Secretary to the Secretary of State from 1942 to 1945. After that she served in Bechuanaland Ottawa, New Delhi and Pretoria. Appointed an Officer of HM Diplomatic Service in 1966, she was Head of the South Asia Department at the CRO then the Pacific Dependent Territories Department before her Botswana appointment. She was Governor of the Commonwealth Institute from 1980 to 1985.
