= Robert Reid (railway executive, born 1921) =

English railway manager, chairman of British Rail from 1983 to 1990

Sir Robert Basil Reid CBE (7 February 1921 – 17 December 1993) was chairman of the British Railways Board from 1983 until 1990.

The son of Sir Robert Niel Reid, Governor of Assam from 1937 to 1942, he was educated at Malvern and Brasenose. During World War II he was an Officer in the Royal Tank Regiment. When peace returned he joined the LNER as a Traffic Apprentice. When the "Big Four" merged he rose steadily within British Railways. By 1961 he was a District Passenger manager and by 1967 Planning Manager of the Scottish Region. He was General Manager of the Southern Region from 1974 to 1976; and the Executive Member for Marketing from 1977 to 1980. He became Chief Executive in 1980, and held that post until his appointment as Chairman. He was a Freeman of the City of London and Master of the Information Technologists' Company from 1988 to 1989.

Business positions
| Preceded by Sir Peter Parker | Chairman of the British Railways Board; 1983–1990 | Succeeded by Sir Bob Reid |
