= Nick Pyle =

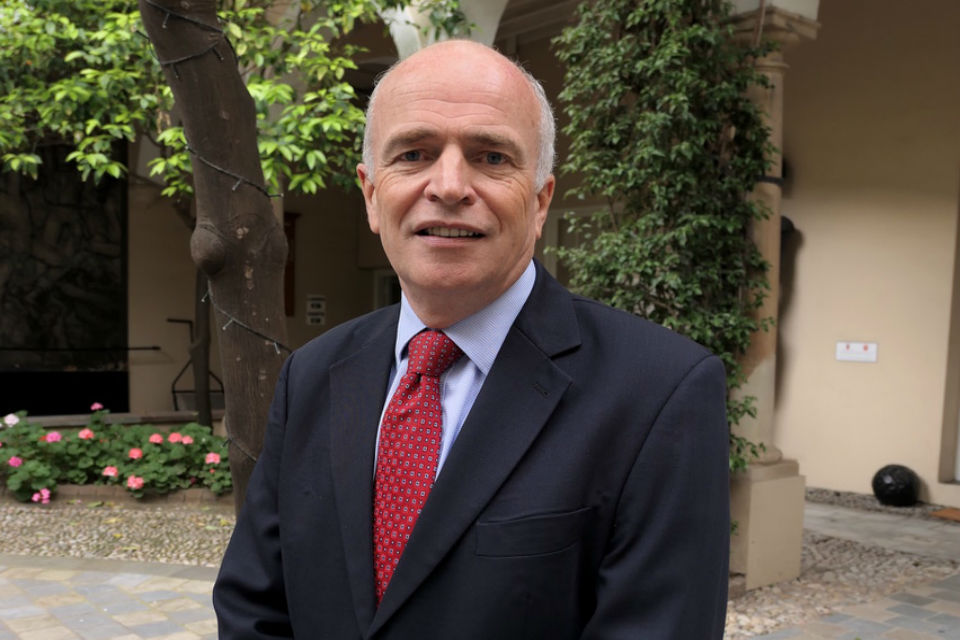
Pyle in 2019

Nicholas John Pyle OBE is British diplomat who served as Deputy Governor of Gibraltar from September 2016 to August 2022. He served as acting Governor from 18 February 2020 to 11 June 2020. Prior to Gibraltar, Pyle had been High Commissioner to Botswana from 2013 to 2016.

Pyle joined the Foreign and Commonwealth Office in 1981. He was awarded an MBE in 1999 and an OBE in 2009.
