= Michael Kenward =

British science writer (1945–2025)

Michael Ronald John Kenward, OBE (12 July 1945 – August 2025) was a British science writer who was editor of New Scientist from 1979 to 1990. He was appointed an Officer of the Order of the British Empire (OBE) in the 1990 Birthday Honours. Kenward died in August 2025, at the age of 80.
