= Wilfred Jones =

British diplomat (1926–2018)

- Born: 29 November 1926
- Died: 30 January 2018 (aged 91)
- Occupation: diplomat
- Known for: High Commissioner to Botswana

Wilfred Jones, CMG, OBE (29 November 1926 – 30 January 2018) was a British diplomat who served as the High Commissioner to Botswana from 1981 to 1986.

Jones joined the Foreign Office in 1949. From 1950 to 1966 he served in Tamsui, Jedda, Brussels and Athens. He was then First Secretary at Canberra, Copenhagen, Blantyre and Lilongwe. He was at the FCO from 1977 to 1981.
