= Kenneth Bagshawe =

British oncologist (1925–2022)

Professor Kenneth Bagshawe CBE FRCP FRCOG FRCR
- Born: Kenneth James Pursglove Bagshawe; 17 August 1925; Marple, Cheshire, England
- Died: 27 December 2022 (aged 97); Paddington, London, England
- Other name: Kenneth Dawson Bagshawe
- Occupations: Oncologist; academic

Kenneth James Pursglove Bagshawe (17 August 1925 – 27 December 2022) was a British oncologist and academic, who was emeritus professor of medical oncology at Charing Cross Hospital.

== Life and career ==
Kenneth James Pursglove Bagshawe was born in Marple, Cheshire, England on 17 August 1925, to Harry Bagshawe, a clerk, and Gladys (née Dawson), a milliner.

Bagshawe worked at St Mary's Hospital Medical School from 1946 to 1952, and subsequently became a research fellow at Johns Hopkins Hospital, in Baltimore, United States, in 1955.

From 1960, he was senior lecturer in medicine at Charing Cross Hospital Medical School, and professor of medical oncology there (from 1975 to 1990).

He served as chair of the Cancer Research Campaign's Scientific Committee (from 1983 to 1988).

Bagshawe was elected a Fellow of the Royal Society (FRS) in 1989, and was appointed Commander of the Order of the British Empire (CBE) in the 1990 Birthday Honours.

Bagshawe died from pneumonia in Paddington, London on 27 December 2022, at the age of 97.

== Works ==
- Choriocarcinoma: the clinical biology of the trophoblast and its tumours, Edward Arnold, 1969
- (editor) Medical oncology: medical aspects of malignant disease, Blackwell Scientific Publications, 1975, ISBN 978-0-632-09370-0
- (editor) VP-16: recent advances and future prospects Grune & Stratton, 1985
