= John Gandee =

British diplomat (1909–1994)

John Stephen Gandee, CMG, OBE (8 December 1909 – 4 April 1994) was High Commissioner to Botswana from 1966 until 1969.

Gandee was educated at Dorking High School for Boys. After seven years with the Post Office he was with the India Office until 1949. He held diplomatic posts in Ottawa, Bechuanaland, Basutoland and Swaziland After this he was Head of the Administration Department at the Commonwealth Relations Office from 1961 to 1964; and Head of Office Services at the Diplomatic Service Administration from 1965 until his Botswana appointment.
