= His Majesty's Diplomatic Service =

Diplomatic service of the United Kingdom

Organisation overview
- Minister responsible: Ed Miliband, Secretary of State for Foreign, Commonwealth and Development Affairs
- Organisation executives: Lindy Cameron, Permanent Under-Secretary for Foreign, Commonwealth & Development Affairs Head of HM Diplomatic Service; Nick Dyer, Second Permanent Under-Secretary for Foreign, Commonwealth & Development Affairs
- Website: Official website

His Majesty's Diplomatic Service (HMDS) is the diplomatic service of the United Kingdom of Great Britain and Northern Ireland, dealing with foreign affairs and representing British interests overseas, as opposed to the Civil Service, which deals with domestic affairs. It employs around 14,000 people, roughly one-third of whom are crown servants working directly for the Foreign, Commonwealth and Development Office, either in London or abroad. The remaining two-thirds are employed locally by one of nearly 270 British diplomatic missions abroad (such as embassies, consulates and high commissions). The Permanent Under-Secretary of State for Foreign Affairs is also the Head of the Diplomatic Service.

Entry into the Diplomatic Service is highly competitive. In 2018, 12,266 applicants sought to join the Diplomatic Service fast stream. Seventy-one were successful, representing 0.6% of those who applied. This compares to the general civil service fast stream, also highly competitive, in which 9.1% of candidates were successful. Until around 2009 members of the Diplomatic Service could also formally receive a Royal Commission, signed by the Foreign Secretary and by the monarch, as members of a Crown service.

The Foreign Service, which originally provided civil servants to staff the Foreign Office, was once a separate service, but it amalgamated with the Diplomatic Service in 1918. The Diplomatic Service also absorbed the Colonial Service in the late 1960s.

Women were not allowed to join the Diplomatic Service until 1946. In 1936, an advisory committee on allowing women into the diplomatic service concluded that the admission of women would harm the service (the female members of the committee disagreed). Until 1973, they were required to leave when they married. The first female ambassador to be appointed was Barbara Salt, to Israel in 1962, but ill-health prevented her from taking up the post. Eleanor Emery was British High Commissioner to Botswana from 1973 to 1977, corresponding to an ambassador but within the Commonwealth. The first woman to serve as an ambassador as such was Anne Warburton, appointed to Denmark in 1976.

== See also ==
- Diplomatic rank § United Kingdom
- List of diplomatic missions of the United Kingdom
- Civil Service (United Kingdom)
- High Commissioner (Commonwealth)
- Colonial Service
