= Bob Reid (businessman) =

British businessman (1934–2025)

Sir Robert Paul Reid (1 May 1934 – 28 May 2025) was a British businessman who was chief executive of Shell from 1985 to 1990 and chairman of the British Railways Board from 1990 until 1995.

== Early life and education ==
Reid was born in Cupar, Fife on 1 May 1934, the son of William Reid, a butcher, and Elizabeth (née Paul). When he was nine years old, an accident involving a mincing machine in his father's shop resulted in the loss of his right hand.

He studied political economy and modern history at the University of St Andrews, graduating in 1956.

== Career ==
In 1956 he joined Shell as a management trainee. He worked for the company in Malaysia, Nigeria and Kenya before returning to Nigeria as managing director from 1970 to 1974. He later served in Thailand and Australia. In 1983 he became the company's coordinator for supply and marketing in London. He served as chairman and chief executive of Shell UK from 1985 to 1990.

=== Chairman of British Rail ===
He became chairman of British Rail in 1990, taking over from Sir Robert Reid (no relation), a position he held until 1995. His period with BR was dominated by the privatisation of the railways. Although not opposed to privatisation in principle, he argued strongly for a different model, in which the privatised businesses would be run as integrated organisations. He later said that separating Railtrack from the rest of the industry was a major mistake.

=== Later career ===
After his time on the railways, he served as chairman of the International Petroleum Exchange, deputy governor of the Bank of Scotland, and chairman of London Electricity, Avis Europe and Sears Holdings.

== Death ==
Reid died on 28 May 2025, at the age of 91. His wife, Joan, died in 2017. They are survived by their three sons: Paul, Michael and Douglas.

Business positions
Preceded by Sir Robert Reid	Chairman of the British Railways Board; 1990–1995	Succeeded by John Welsby
