= Aspect (trade union) =

Former trade union of the United Kingdom

- Merged into: Prospect
- Founded: 1919
- Dissolved: 2012
- Headquarters: Woolley, West Yorkshire
- Location: United Kingdom
- Members: 4,140
- Key people: John Chowcat, general secretary
- Affiliations: TUC
- Website: www.aspect.org.uk

Aspect was a former trade union in the United Kingdom for professionals working in children's services.

== History ==
The union was founded in 1919 by four school inspectors as the National Association of Inspectors of Schools and Educational Organisers (NAIEO). Membership rose to around 200 by the mid-1920s, and the organisation affiliated to NALGO for representation and negotiation for some years. The two unions then separated due to policy differences, but membership continued its slow rise, reaching 800 in 1970.

In 1974, the union became the National Association of Inspectors and Educational Advisers (NAIEA), and began recruiting educational consultants. In 1977, it first gained its Certificate of Independence. By 1980, membership had reached 1,400, and the union affiliated to the National Association of Head Teachers for the provision of some services. Under the secretaryship of Bill Wright, in 1993, the union once again asserted its independence, and renamed itself as the National Association of Educational Inspectors, Advisers and Consultants (NAEIAC).

The union appointed John Chowcat as its first full-time general secretary in 1999, and affiliated to the Trades Union Congress in 2002. In 2005, membership reached 4,000, and it adopted its most recent name, a backronym for "Association of Professionals in Education and Children's Trusts".

In 2012, the union merged into Prospect.
