= Neville Shulman =

British mountaineer and explorer

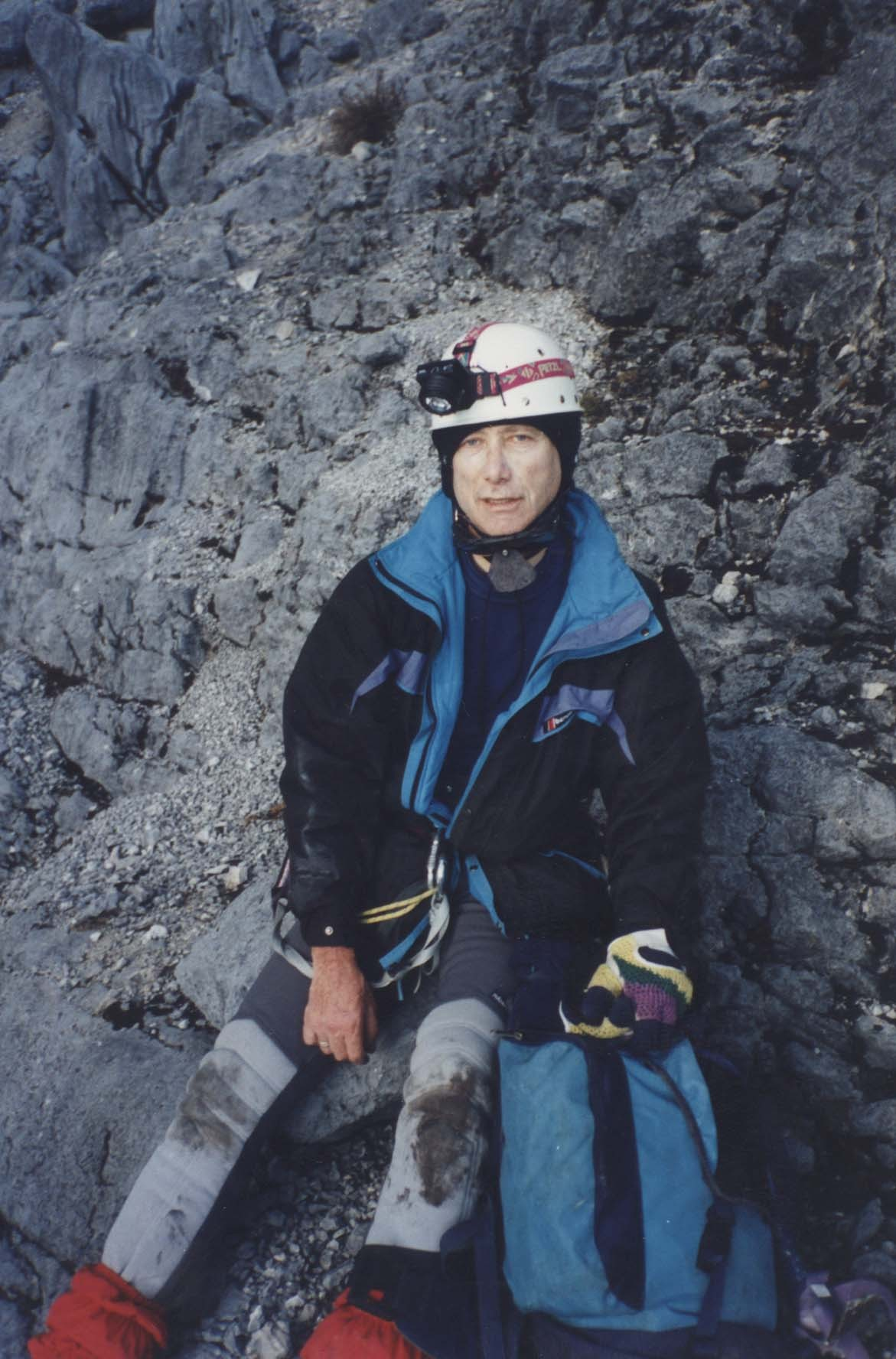
Neville Shulman Mount Ngga Pulu

Neville Shulman CBE FRGS is a British mountaineer, explorer, author, and Ridley Scott's personal consultant and adviser. He has been closely involved with Ridley Scott throughout his film career and involved with all his films, including Blade Runner, Thelma & Louise, Black Hawk Down, Kingdom of Heaven, Gladiator, Robin Hood, Prometheus, and The Counselor.

Neville Shulman is a Fellow of the Royal Geographical Society, Fellow of the Explorers Club, member of the Scientific Exploration Society and of the Bhutan Society. He is a Freeman of the City of London and a member of the Worshipful Company of Blacksmiths. He is involved with numerous charitable organisations and is an Ambassador of Action for Children (previously NCH). He was made an Officer of the Order of the British Empire (OBE) and was then made a Commander of the Order of the British Empire (CBE) by Queen Elizabeth II.

Shulman has many ties with the film and theatre industry including being a Fellow of the Royal Society for the Encouragement of the Arts, Chairman of the Theatre Forum, Director of the British International Theatre Institute and previously Vice-President of the Drama Centre, Vice Chair of the UK UNESCO Culture Committee and editor of the Contemporary Theatre Review.

He is a collector of modern and contemporary art, a Patron of New Art, a Fellow of the Royal Society For The Encouragement Of The Arts, a Director of Shepperton Film Studios, and has many involvements in the entertainment industries. He is an author, journalist and lecturer on philosophy, mountaineering and exploration. He was one of the Olympic Torch Bearers at the London 2012 Games.

He set up the Neville Shulman Challenge Award at the Royal Geographical Society and the Earthwatch Shulman Awards to support conservation issues, both Awards being given out annually.

Shulman is the author of several books, both factual and fiction, including Some Like It Cold, which is a philosophical and humorous account concerning his expeditions to the North Pole and subsequently to the South Pole, Climbing the Equator, Running the Jungle and Zen in the Art of Climbing Mountains.

Neville Shulman has travelled extensively throughout the world, including India, China, Outer Mongolia, Tibet, Russia, Ecuador, Venezuela, Peru, Brazil, Argentina, Costa Rica, Armenia, Azerbaijan, Nepal, Kenya, Tanzania, Israel, Egypt, Jordan and Libya. In 1989, he travelled to the Arctic and the North Pole in an expedition organized with the Tate Gallery. To raise funds for the Red Cross, in 1996/97 he embarked on an expedition to Antarctica and the South Pole. Every year he undertakes one or two expeditions and explorations to raise funds for charities.
