= List of high commissioners of the United Kingdom to Botswana =

The high commissioner of the United Kingdom to Botswana is the United Kingdom's foremost diplomatic representative in the Republic of Botswana, and head of the UK's diplomatic mission in Gaborone.

Botswana (formerly the British protectorate of Bechuanaland) gained independence on 30 September 1966. As Botswana is a member of the Commonwealth of Nations, it and the United Kingdom exchange high commissioners rather than ambassadors. The British high commissioner to Botswana is also the UK representative to the Southern African Development Community whose headquarters are in Gaborone.

== List of heads of mission ==
=== British high commissioners to Botswana ===
- 1966–1969: John Gandee
- 1969–1973: George Anderson
- 1973–1977: Eleanor Emery
- 1977–1981: Wilfred Turner
- 1981–1986: Wilfred Jones
- 1986–1989: Peter Raftery
- 1989–1991: Brian Smith
- 1991–1994: John Edwards
- 1995–1998: David Beaumont
- 1998–2001: John Wilde
- 2001–2005: David Merry
- 2005–2010: Frank Martin
- 2010–2013: Jennifer Anderson
- 2013–2016: Nick Pyle
- 2016-2020 Katy Ransome
- 2020–2024: Sian Price
- 2024–present: Giles Enticknap MBE
