= British Railways Board =

Nationalised industry in the United Kingdom that existed from 1962 to 2001

- The Board traded as British Rail from 1965 until its privatisation
- Type: Statutory corporation
- Industry: Rail transport
- Predecessor: British Transport Commission
- Founded: 1 January 1963
- Defunct: October 2001
- Fate: Privatised
- Headquarters: London, United Kingdom
- Parent: Department for Transport

The British Railways Board (BRB) was a nationalised industry in the United Kingdom that operated from 1963 to 2001. Until 1997, it was responsible for most railway services in Great Britain, trading under the brand name British Railways and, from 1965, British Rail. It did not operate railways in Northern Ireland, where railways were the responsibility of the Government of Northern Ireland.

It is a statutory corporation, which when operating consisted of a chairman and nine to fifteen other members appointed by the Secretary of State for Transport. The Board, now reduced to a minimum membership of a chairman and one other member, continues to exist to hold the French law benefits and obligations of the Channel Tunnel Rail Usage Contract.

== Formation ==
The BRB was created on 1 January 1963 under the Transport Act 1962 by Harold Macmillan's Conservative government to inherit the railway responsibilities of the British Transport Commission, which was dissolved at the same time.

== Operations ==
Initially, and for the majority of its history, the BRB operated under the structure inherited from the BTC Railway Executive. Operations were initially divided into six regions – Eastern, London Midland, North Eastern, Western, Southern and Scottish (later rebranded ScotRail). The North Eastern region was merged into the Eastern Region in 1967.

In the 1980s, the BRB moved to a sectoral model based on business activity – InterCity for long-distance passenger trains, Network SouthEast for commuter trains in London, and Regional Railways for short-distance and commuter trains outside the Network SouthEast area. Railfreight was organised separately.

As well as the railway network, for much of its history the BRB also ran ferry services (later as Sealink) and hotels. These were sold in the 1980s.

The final BRB structure (1994–1997) was a shadow form of the future privatised railway industry, becoming a holding company for over 100 subsidiaries, including 25 passenger train operating, six freight, three rolling stock leasing, and a number of track maintenance companies. These were slowly sold during privatisation (the passenger subsidiaries were franchised to private sector concerns).

== Winding down ==
On 1 April 1994, railway infrastructure became the responsibility of public limited company Railtrack, initially Government owned. The BRB continued to operate all trains until 1996, when the process of transferring them to the private sector began.

Privatisation was completed in 1997, but the BRB continued to discharge residual functions relating to non-operational railway land and BR pensions, and to have responsibility for the British Transport Police. In 1999 Alistair Morton was appointed the last chairman of the BRB, which began to advise on passenger railway matters. During this time it operated with the Director of Passenger Rail Franchising under the trading name of the Shadow Strategic Rail Authority.

Under the Transport Act 2000, the Office of Passenger Rail Franchising was abolished and the majority of BRB's functions were transferred to the Strategic Rail Authority's wholly owned subsidiary BRB (Residuary) Limited. In 2001 the minimum membership of the Board itself was reduced to the chairman and one other member. With the dissolution of the SRA under the Railways Act 2005, BRB (Residuary) became a wholly owned subsidiary of the Secretary of State for Transport. While the Transport Act allowed for BRB to be abolished, the Board's remaining function is to hold the French law benefits and obligations of the Channel Tunnel Rail Usage Contract on trust for the Secretary of State for Transport. In this function it has outlived its own residuary company, which was wound up on until 30 September 2013, pursuant to the Public Bodies review.

Through its subsidiary Rail Property Ltd, BRB (Residuary) retained responsibility for non-operational railway land, for example railway lines closed in the Beeching Axe that have not been sold.

The BRB owned a large amount of archive material, including papers, maps, films and photographs, dating back before nationalisation. In 1997 these were distributed to other bodies: films (the bulk of which had been produced by British Transport Films) to the British Film Institute in London, photographs to the National Railway Museum (NRM) in York, and most papers to the Public Record Office.

== Chairmen ==
British Transport Commission

- Sir Cyril Hurcomb (1948–1953)
  Railway Executive (the subsidiary of the BTC responsible for railways from 1948 to 1953)
  - Sir Eustace Missenden (1948–1951)
  - Sir John Elliot (1951–1953)
- Sir Brian Robertson (1953–1961)
- Dr Richard Beeching (1961–1963)

British Railways Board

- Dr Richard Beeching (1963–1965)
- Sir Stanley Raymond (1965–1967)
- Sir Henry Johnson (1967–1971)
- Sir Richard Marsh (1971–1976)
- Sir Peter Parker (1976–1983)
- Sir Robert Reid (1983–1990)
- Sir Bob Reid (1990–1995)
- John Welsby (1995–1999)
- Sir Alistair Morton (1999–2001)

== Some other BRB members ==
- Ian McDonald Campbell (1977–1987) (part-time from October 1983);
- Prudence Leith (part-time);
- Viscount Caldecote;
- Michael Posner;
- Lord Taylor of Gryfe;
- Simon Jenkins (part-time).
- John Nunneley

== Arms ==
Coat of arms of British Railways Board
Notes Granted on 17 May 1956 to the British Transport Commission. Transferred to the British Railways Board on 20 February 1963. Crest On a wreath Argent and Vert, a demi lion Gules holding between the paws a railway wheel Argent. Escutcheon Vert, on a fess double-cottised Argent between in chief three railway wheels of the last and in base a portcullis also Argent two barrulets wary Azure. Supporters On either side a lion guardant Gules charged on the shoulder with a railway wheel Argent. Motto 'Velociter Et Securiter'
