= Edward Clarke (author) =

English cleric and author

Edward Clarke (1730–1786) was an English cleric and author.

== Life ==
The son of William Clarke the antiquary (1696–1771), and Anne, daughter of Dr. William Wotton, he was born at Buxted, Sussex, where his father was rector, on 16 March 1730. He was taught by his father's curate, Mr. Gerison, the master of Uckfield School, and later by Jeremiah Markland, then also living at Uckfield; and in due course was sent to Winchester College. From there he entered St John's College, Cambridge, took his B.A. degree in 1752, was elected a Fellow in 1753, and proceeded to M.A. in 1755. In 1758 Viscount Midleton presented him to the rectory of Peperharow, Surrey.

In 1760 Clarke went with the Earl of Bristol to serve as chaplain to the British embassy at Madrid. In 1763 he accompanied James Johnston, the Lieutenant-Governor, to Menorca as chaplain and secretary, and held the same post under succeeding governors. In 1768 he returned to England and was inducted to the vicarage of Willingdon and Arlington, Sussex. He also succeeded to the rectory of Buxted, his father being allowed to resign in his favour, and gave up the Peperharow living. His health was poor, and he settled down to a literary life, undertaking the education of Thomas Steele, and his brother Robert.

Clarke died, after gradual decay and paralysis, in November 1786.

== Works ==
Clarke's first publication was a poem in Greek hexameters, on the death of Frederick, Prince of Wales, in the Luctus Academiæ Cantabrigiensis, 1751. In 1755 he published A Letter to a Friend in Italy, and Verses on reading Montfaucon. He produced Letters concerning the State of Spain … written at Madrid during the years 1760 and 1761, (1763), with details and statistics; and A Defence of the conduct of the Lieutenant-governor of the Island of Menorca, in Reply to a Printed Libel (London, 1767).

== Family ==
In 1763 Clarke married Anne, daughter of Thomas Grenfield of Guildford, Surrey. He left three sons: the Rev. James Stanier Clarke, Edward Daniel Clarke, and George, of the Royal Navy, who drowned in the River Thames in 1806. His only daughter, Anne, was married to Captain William Standway Parkinson, RN (1769–1838), who was with Nelson at the battle of Trafalgar.

== Notes ==
Attribution

This article incorporates text from a publication now in the public domain: Stephen, Leslie, ed. (1887). "Clarke, Edward (1730-1786)". Dictionary of National Biography. Vol. 10. London: Smith, Elder & Co.
