= William Clarke (antiquary) =

English cleric and antiquary

William Clarke (1696–1771) was an English cleric and antiquary.

== Life ==
Born at Haughmond Abbey in Shropshire, he was the son of a yeoman who acted as confidential agent for the Kynaston family of Hardwick (Shropshire), and w for that family. Clarke was educated at Shrewsbury School and at St John's College, Cambridge. He graduated B.A. in 1715, M.A. 1719, and became a Fellow of his college on 22 January 1717.

On leaving university Clarke acted as chaplain to Adam Ottley, bishop of St. David's, and on Ottley's death in 1723 was for a short time domestic chaplain to Thomas Holles, Duke of Newcastle. In 1724 he was presented by Archbishop William Wake to the rectory of Buxted in Sussex, and in September 1727 was made prebendary of Hova Villa in Chichester Cathedral, and in 1738 canon residentiary. In 1768, he obtained permission to resign the rectory of Buxted to his son Edward.

In June 1770 Clarke was installed chancellor of Chichester (also holding the rectories of Chiddingly and Pevensey). In August of the same year he was presented to the vicarage of Amport, the vicarial residence, which he resigned to a friend who died in July 1771.

In the spring of 1771 Clarke suffered from gout, and died on 21 October of that year. He was buried in Chichester Cathedral, behind the choir.

William Hayley, a close friend of the Clarkes, wrote some memorial verses for "Mild" William Clarke and Anne his wife. Among Clarke's friends and correspondents were Hayley, Jeremiah Markland, John Taylor, Thomas Secker, and Thomas Sherlock.

== Works ==
Clarke's major work was The Connexion of the Roman, Saxon, and English Coins deduced from observations on the Saxon Weights and Money (London, 1767); another edition appeared in 1771. He also wrote the Latin preface (1730) to the collection of the Welsh laws of William Wotton, his father-in-law; a translation of Joseph Trapp's Lectures on Poetry, annotations on the Greek Testament (the two latter with William Bowyer), and some notes to the English version of Jean-Philippe-René de La Bléterie's Life of the Emperor Julian. A Discourse on the Commerce of the Romans was by Clarke or Bowyer.

Clarke drew up a manuscript The Antiquities of the Cathedral of Chichester,’ which was presented by his grandson to Alexander Hay, the local historian.

== Family ==
Clarke married Anne Wotton (b. June 1700, d. 11 July 1783), daughter of Dr. William Wotton, by whom he had three children, two of whom survived him:a son, Edward, and a daughter, Anne, who died, unmarried, at Chichester.

== Notes ==
Attribution

This article incorporates text from a publication now in the public domain: Stephen, Leslie, ed. (1887). "Clarke, William (1696-1771)". Dictionary of National Biography. Vol. 10. London: Smith, Elder & Co.
