= Lectionary 237 =

Lectionary ℓ 237
- New Testament manuscript
- Text: Evangelistarium †
- Date: 12th century
- Script: Greek
- Now at: British Library
- Size: 26.3 cm by 19.6 cm

Lectionary 237, designated by siglum ℓ 237 (in the Gregory-Aland numbering) is a Greek manuscript of the New Testament, on parchment. Palaeographically it has been assigned to the 12th century. Scrivener labelled it by 237^{evl}. The manuscript has not complex contents. It was supplied from several manuscripts.

== Description ==
The codex contains lessons from the Gospels of John, Matthew, Luke lectionary (Evangelistarium), on 132 parchment leaves (26.3 cm by 19.6 cm), with some lacunae at the end. There are daily lessons from Easter to Pentecost.

It is roughly executed and apparently made from several copies. The leaves 128-136 came from other manuscript, leaves 137-139 from another.

It contains musical notes.

The text is written in Greek minuscule letters, in two columns per page, 19-20 lines per page.

== History ==
Scrivener dated the manuscript to the 13th century, Gregory to the 12th century. It is presently assigned by the INTF to the 12th century.

The manuscript was examined by Coxe and Dean Burgon.

The manuscript was added to the list of New Testament manuscripts by Scrivener (number 237) and Gregory (number 237a). Gregory saw it in 1883.

The manuscript is not cited in the critical editions of the Greek New Testament (UBS3).

Currently the codex is housed at the British Library (Add MS 36822) in London.

== See also ==
- List of New Testament lectionaries
- Biblical manuscript
- Textual criticism

== Bibliography ==
- Gregory, Caspar René (1900). Textkritik des Neuen Testaments, Vol. 1. Leipzig. p. 407.
