= Arthur Walter James =

British politician (1912–2015)

- Born: 30 June 1912
- Died: 5 August 2015 (aged 103)
- Occupation(s): Politician, journalist
- Spouses: Elisabeth Howroyd (m. 1939; div. 1956); Ann Burton (m. 1957)
- Children: 5

Arthur Walter James (30 June 1912 – 5 August 2015) was a British journalist and Liberal Party politician.

== Background ==
He was the son of W.J. James OBE. He was educated at Uckfield Grammar School and Keble College, Oxford, where he obtained a 1st Class degree in Modern History. He was a Liddon Student and an Arnold Essay Prizeman. He married, in 1939, Elisabeth Howroyd. They had one daughter. The marriage was dissolved in 1956. He then remarried in 1957 to Ann Jocelyn Burton. They had one daughter, one adopted son and two adopted daughters. She died in 2004.

== Professional career ==
He was Senior Demy of Magdalen College, Oxford, 1935; Scholar in Mediæval Studies, British School at Rome, 1935; He was on the Editorial staff, at the Manchester Guardian, 1937–46. NFS 1939–45. He moved to London where he was Deputy Editor, of The Times Educational Supplement, 1947–51, Editor, 1952–69; Special Advisor on Education, of Times Newspapers, 1969–71; and Editor, Technology, 1957–60. He was Reader in Journalism, at the University of Canterbury, New Zealand, 1971–74. He was a Member of: the BBC General Advisory Council, 1956–64; Council of Industrial Design, 1961–66; Council, Royal Society of Arts, 1964; Committee, British-American Associates, 1964; He was a Governor, of Central School of Art and Design, 1966. Woodard Lecturer, 1965.

== Political career ==
Both James and his first wife, Elisabeth Howroyd were active in politics for the Liberal Party in the Manchester area. He took a particular interest in the Liberal policy of Profit sharing. He was a Liberal candidate for the Bury Division of Lancashire at the 1945 General Election.

General Election 1945: Bury
Party	Candidate	Votes	%	±%
Conservative	Walter Fletcher	14,012	39.9	
Labour	Sydney Hand	13,902	39.6	
Liberal	Arthur Walter James	7,211	20.5	
Majority		110	0.3	
Turnout			78.2	
Conservative hold		Swing		

After the election he was re-adopted by the Bury Liberal Association to contest the seat again and remained PPC through to 1947 when he moved to London. Following boundary changes, the seat was abolished and he did not stand for parliament again.

== Later years ==
Upon turning 100, he wrote an article for The Sunday Times reflecting on his age. He was believed to be one of only three known surviving candidates from the 1945 general election. The others being Denis Healey and Jeremy Hutchinson. He died on 5 August 2015, aged 103.

== Publications ==
He was the Editor of Temples and Faiths 1958; The Christian in Politics, 1962; The Teacher and his World, 1962; A Middle-class Parent's Guide to Education, 1964; He was also a contributor to Looking Forward to the Seventies, 1967.
