= Uckfield School =

Defunct school in England

- Uckfield, East Sussex; England

Information
- Other names: Uckfield Grammar School; Dr Saunders's School; Saunders Foundation School
- Established: 1718
- Founder: Rev. Dr Anthony Saunders
- Closed: 1930
- Gender: Boys

Uckfield School, founded in 1718, later called Uckfield Grammar School, grew from a small local charity school at Uckfield into a grammar school with about 160 boys, including boarders. It closed in 1930.

At various times the school was also called Dr Saunders's School and the Saunders Foundation School.

== Beginnings ==
The school was founded by the Rev. Dr Anthony Saunders, Rector of Buxted (died 1719) to teach reading, writing, arithmetic, and the elements of the church catechism to "six poor boys of Buxted and six poor boys of Uckfield". The first Master of the school was the Rev. John Lloyd. In his Will dated 31 October 1718, Saunders left a house in Church Street, Uckfield, which provided a house for the schoolmaster, his library of some six hundred books, and an income of £10 a year charged on Rocks Farm, Buxted. He also left bequests for founding a separate school for girls at Buxted and for providing apprenticeships for local boys.

== Development ==
In the middle and second half of the 18th century, Uckfield School flourished under the mastership of the Rev. Robert Gerison, formerly Margerison, who probably held the mastership from 1738 until his death in the late 1790s. Born about 1712, he was a scholar from Peterhouse, Cambridge, who had graduated MA in 1737. There is some obscurity about who attended the school under the Will of Dr Saunders and who was a private pupil, but Gerison's pupils at Uckfield included James Stanier Clarke and Edward Daniel Clarke. Early in the next century, under the Rev. William Rose, curate of Little Horsted, who became Master of the school in 1800, boys were again taught to a high standard, including Rose's sons Hugh and Henry Rose.

In a Charity Commissioners' report of 1819, it was noted that the schoolmaster of the day had invested about £1,000 of his own money in improving the school and had transferred the twelve scholars provided for under the Will of Dr Saunders to a recently established National School, paying it £20 a year to educate them.

In 1855, after there had been an accumulation of funds, the Charity Commissioners approved an improved scheme for funding the school by a charity called the Buxted and Uckfield Saunders Foundation, and in 1865 The Worthies of Sussex noted that the school was then devoted to "middle class" education. In 1876 a scheme of management was approved by Queen Victoria under which the master of the school must be a graduate of a British university. In 1880, the Saunders foundation sold Rocks Farm and paid for the building of dormitories for sixteen boarders and a gymnasium.

== Closure ==
The school was closed in July 1930, as a result of a new county school for boys being about to open at Lewes in September of the same year, and some boys transferred to the new school. The last headmaster was C. R. McGregor Williams (1889–1954), who in 1931 became the first head of the new Chislehurst and Sidcup Grammar School.

== Aftermath ==
The school's main building can still be seen in Church Street, Uckfield, and is called the Old Grammar School. The Saunders educational charity still exists, using its income to assist Church of England schools and to provide scholarships for local children.

At least one old boy of Uckfield School was still living in July 2015, in the shape of Arthur Walter James, whose connection with the school was reported when he reached the age of 103, but he died shortly afterwards.

== Notable old boys ==
- Edward Clarke (1730–1786), clergyman and author
- James Stanier Clarke (1766–1834), clergyman and author
- Edward Daniel Clarke (1769–1822), clergyman, naturalist, and traveller
- William Nevill, 4th Earl of Abergavenny (1792–1868), landowner and peer
- Hugh James Rose (1795–1838), clergyman and academic
- Henry Rose (1800–1873), clergyman
- Sir Ewart Smith (1897–1995), engineer
- Arthur Walter James (1912–2015), journalist and politician
