= Richard Beeching =

British physicist and engineer (1913–1985)

The Right Honourable The Lord Beeching
- Beeching in 1970
- Born: Richard Beeching; 21 April 1913; Sheerness, Kent, England
- Died: 23 March 1985 (aged 71); East Grinstead, West Sussex, England
- Education: Maidstone Grammar School; Imperial College London
- Occupations: Physicist; engineer
- Years active: 1961–1985
- Known for: Beeching Report on railway closures
- Title: Baron Beeching
- Spouse: Ella Tiley (m. 1938)

Richard Beeching, Baron Beeching (21 April 1913 – 23 March 1985), commonly known as Dr Beeching, was a British physicist and engineer who was chairman of British Railways. He became a household name in Britain in the early 1960s for his report The Reshaping of British Railways, commonly referred to as The Beeching Report, which led to far-reaching changes in the railway network, popularly known as the Beeching Axe.

As a result of the report, just over 4,000 route miles (6,400 kilometres) were removed from the system on cost and efficiency grounds, leaving Britain with 13,721 miles (22,082 km) of railway lines in 1966. A further 2,000 miles (3,200 km) were lost by the end of the 1960s, while other lines were reduced to freight use only.

== Early years ==
Beeching was born in Sheerness on the Isle of Sheppey in Kent, the second of four brothers. His father was Hubert Josiah Beeching, a reporter with the Kent Messenger newspaper, his mother a schoolteacher and his maternal grandfather a dockyard worker. Shortly after his birth, Beeching's family moved to Maidstone where his brothers Kenneth (who was killed in the Second World War) and John were born. All four Beeching boys attended the local Church of England primary school, Maidstone All Saints, and won scholarships to Maidstone Grammar School, where Richard was a prefect. Beeching and his elder brother Geoffrey attended Imperial College of Science & Technology in London, where both read physics and took first class honours degrees. His younger brothers both attended Downing College, Cambridge.

Beeching remained at Imperial College where he undertook a PhD degree under the supervision of Sir George Thomson. He continued in research until 1943, first at the Fuel Research Station in Greenwich in 1936 and then the following year with the Mond Nickel Laboratories in London, where he was appointed senior physicist carrying out research in the fields of physics, metallurgy and mechanical engineering.

In 1938 he married Ella Margaret Tiley, whom he had known since his schooldays. They initially set up home in Solihull, and remained married for the rest of his life. They had no children. During the Second World War Beeching, at the age of 29, was lent by Mond Nickel on the recommendation of Dr Sykes at Firth Brown Steels to the Ministry of Supply, where he worked in its Armament Design and Research Departments at Fort Halstead. His first post was with the Shell Design Section where he had a rank equivalent to that of army captain. Whilst with Armament Design, Beeching worked under the department's superintendent and chief engineer, Sir Frank Smith, a former chief engineer with Imperial Chemical Industries (ICI).

After the war, Smith returned to ICI as technical director and was replaced as chief engineer of Armament Design by Sir Steuart Mitchell who promoted Beeching, then 33, to the post of deputy chief engineer with a rank equivalent to that of brigadier. Beeching continued his work with armaments, particularly anti-aircraft weaponry and small arms. In 1948 he joined ICI, as personal technical assistant to Sir Frank Smith; he remained for around 18 months, working on the production lines for various products such as zip fasteners, paints and leathercloth with a view to improving efficiency and reducing production costs. He was then appointed to the Terylene Council, and subsequently to the board of ICI Fibres Division.

In 1953 he went to Canada as vice-president of ICI (Canada) Ltd, and was given overall responsibility for a terylene plant in Ontario. He returned after two years to become chairman of ICI Metals Division on the recommendation of Sir Ewart Smith. In 1957 he was appointed to the ICI board as technical director, and for a short time also served as development director.

== Stedeford Committee ==
Sir Ewart Smith, who retired from ICI in 1959, was asked by the Conservative Minister of Transport, Ernest Marples, to become a member of an advisory group on the financial state of the British Transport Commission to be chaired by Sir Ivan Stedeford. Smith declined but recommended Beeching in his place, a suggestion which Marples accepted. Stedeford and Beeching clashed on a number of issues connected with Beeching's proposal to drastically prune Britain's rail infrastructure. In spite of questions being asked in Parliament, Sir Ivan's report was not published until much later.

== Government appointment ==
=== British Railways Chairman ===
On 15 March 1961 Ernest Marples announced in the House of Commons that Beeching would be the first chairman of the British Railways Board in due course, and that in the meantime he would be a part-time member of the British Transport Commission with immediate effect, becoming the chairman of the commission from 1 June 1961. The board was to be the successor to the British Transport Commission, which would be abolished by the Transport Act 1962. Beeching would receive the same yearly salary that he was earning at ICI, the controversial sum of £24,000 (over £490,000 in 2016 currency), which was £14,000 more than his predecessor Sir Brian Robertson and two-and-a-half times higher than the salary of any head of a nationalised industry at the time. Beeching was given a leave of absence for five years by ICI in order to carry out this task.

At that time the government was seeking professional advice from outside the railway industry to improve the financial position of British Railways. There was widespread concern at the time that, despite substantial investment in the 1955 Modernisation Plan, the railways continued to record increasing losses – from £15.6 million in 1956 to £42 million in 1960. Passenger and goods traffic was also declining in the face of increased competition from the roads; by 1960, one in nine households owned or had access to a car. It would be Beeching's task to find a way of returning the industry to profitability as soon as possible.

=== First Beeching Report ===
On 27 March 1963, under orders from Marples, Beeching published his report on the future of the railways, entitled The Reshaping of British Railways. He called for the closure of one-third of the country's 7,000 railway stations. Passenger services would be withdrawn from around 5,000 route miles accounting for an annual train mileage of 68 million and yielding, according to Beeching, a net saving of £18m per year. There were no proposals to improve or repurpose the usage and efficiency of the existing network or how to maintain or dispose of redundant infrastructure. The reshaping would also involve the shedding of around 70,000 British Railways jobs over three years. Beeching forecast that his changes would result in an improvement in British Railways' accounts of between £115 million and £147 million. The cut-backs would include the scrapping of a third of a million goods wagons, much as Stedeford had foreseen and fought against.

Unsurprisingly, Beeching's plans were hugely controversial not only with trade unions, but with the Labour opposition and railway-using public. Beeching was undeterred and argued that too many lines were running at a loss, and that his charge to shape a profitable railway made cuts a logical starting point. As one author puts it, Beeching "was expected to produce quick solutions to problems that were deep-seated and not susceptible to purely intellectual analysis." For his part, Beeching was unrepentant about his role in the closures: "I suppose I'll always be looked upon as the axe man, but it was surgery, not mad chopping."

Beeching was nevertheless instrumental in modernising many aspects of the railway network, particularly a greater emphasis on block trains which did not require expensive and time-consuming shunting en route.

Labour came to power at the general election in October 1964. On 23 December 1964, Transport Minister Tom Fraser informed the House of Commons that Beeching was to return to ICI in June 1965.

=== Second Beeching Report and creation of British Rail ===
In early 1965 Beeching unveiled the new brand for the railways – British Rail – and its 'double arrow' symbol, which is still in use as the symbol of National Rail now. The legal name of the British Railways Board did not change. On 16 February Beeching introduced the second stage of his reorganisation of the railways. his second report set out his conclusion that of the 7,500 miles (12,100 km) of trunk railway throughout Britain, only 3,000 miles (4,800 km) "should be selected for future development" and invested in. This policy would result in traffic through Britain being routed through nine selected lines. Traffic to Coventry, Birmingham, Manchester, Liverpool and Scotland would be routed through the West Coast Main Line running to Carlisle and Glasgow; traffic to the north-east would be concentrated through the East Coast Main Line which was classified as ‘not for development’ north of Newcastle; and traffic to Wales and the West Country would go on the Great Western Main Line, then to Swansea and Plymouth. Underpinning Beeching's proposals was his belief that there was still too much duplication in the railway network, although this report did not propose any closures. Of the 7,500 miles (12,100 km) of trunk route, 3,700 miles (6,000 km) involves a choice between two routes, 700 miles (1,100 km) a choice of three, and over a further 700 miles (1,100 km) a choice of four.

These proposals were rejected by the government, which put an early end to his secondment from ICI; Beeching returned there in June 1965. It is a point of contention whether he left by mutual arrangement with the government or was sacked. Frank Cousins, the Labour Minister of Technology, told the House of Commons in November 1965 that Beeching had been dismissed by Tom Fraser. Beeching denied this, pointing out that he had returned early to ICI as he would not have had enough time to undertake an in-depth transport study before the formal end of his secondment from ICI.

== Later years ==
Upon returning to ICI, Beeching was appointed liaison director for the agricultural division and organisation and services director. He later rose to become deputy chairman from 1966 to 1968. In the 1965 Birthday Honours it was announced that he would be made a life peer, and he was created Baron Beeching, of East Grinstead in the County of Sussex on 7 July 1965, in the same year he became a director of Lloyds Bank. In 1966 he was appointed as chairman of the royal commission to examine assizes and quarter sessions; he eventually proposed a mass reorganisation of the court system, involving the setting-up of regional courts in cities such as Cardiff, Birmingham and Leeds leading to the Courts Act 1971.

In 1968, Beeching met with John Lennon and Paul McCartney to discuss the possibility of Beeching becoming the head of the Beatles' Apple Corps; however, Beeching declined the offer.

The following year he became chairman of Associated Electrical Industries, a role he also held with Redland from 1970 to 1977, Furness Withy from 1973 to 1975 and the Economic Insurance Company. In 1968 he was invited to deliver the MacMillan Memorial Lecture to the Institution of Engineers and Shipbuilders in Scotland. He chose the subject "Organisation".

On 21 May 1969, Beeching performed the official opening ceremony for the heritage railway between Totnes and Ashburton, then known as the Dart Valley Railway.

He died at Queen Victoria Hospital, East Grinstead, in March 1985.

The lines chosen in the 'Beeching II' report "for future development". The fate of other lines was not discussed.

== Legacy ==
The Beeching Report remains controversial. Critics have accused Beeching of ignoring the social consequences of his proposals (there is little doubt that rail replacement bus services were rarely a success); encouraging car use; ignoring possible economies that might have saved lines; and, getting the figures wrong.

Some have accused him of being part of or even the scapegoat for a conspiracy against the railways involving politicians, civil servants and the road lobby. The report was commissioned by a Conservative government with strong ties to the road construction lobby and its findings were largely implemented by the subsequent Labour governments whose party received funds from unions associated with road industry associations.

Others have argued that it was ministers, not Beeching, who were responsible for any shortcomings in assessing the social case for retaining lines and that economies had been tried and largely failed; also that the road lobby was less significant than the Treasury in making policy, and the Labour Party was also funded by rail unions.

It is worth noting that the size, shape and level of service of the railway network in Great Britain was the subject of debate for many decades before the appointment of Beeching. The Salter Report of 1933 attempted to address the issue of growing abstraction of rail traffic by road and the low level of road pricing. At the appointment of the British Transport Commission in 1947, the question of uneconomic branch lines and their selection for closure was the subject of a Railway Executive branch line committee. The British Railways Modernisation Plan of 1955 stated, "there will be a marked reduction in the stopping and branch-line services which are little used by the public and which, on any dispassionate review of the situation, should be largely handed over to road transport". Prime Minister Harold Macmillan stated in 1960, "the industry must be of a size and pattern suited to modern conditions and prospects. In particular, the railway system must be modelled to meet current needs". In this respect, Beeching can be thus seen to have taken a courageous approach to implementing an unpopular policy which politicians had deferred for many decades.

On the other hand, Hardy points out Beeching's political naïveté, and Fiennes notes that because a passenger service was producing a loss did not mean that it would continue to do so in the future. Like Fiennes and Hardy, Terry Gourvish's business history of British Rail sees Beeching as having a positive effect on railway management while not achieving perfection. There is a broad consensus that the detail of figures used in individual cases were imperfect, but a wide divergence of view as to the significance of and motives for this.

Ian Hislop commented in 2008 that history has been somewhat unkind to "Britain's most hated civil servant", by forgetting that he proposed a much better bus service that ministers never delivered, and that in some ways he was used to do their "dirty work for them". Hislop describes Beeching as "a technocrat [who] wasn't open to argument to romantic notions of rural England or the warp and weft of the train in our national identity. He didn't buy any of that. He went for a straightforward profit and loss approach and some claim we are still reeling from that today".

Several ex-railway sites have been named after Beeching:

- There is a pub that was called Lord Beechings at the end of the Cambrian Railways at Aberystwyth, which until its refurbishment by Brains Brewery was decorated with various railway memorabilia, in particular regarding the Aberystwyth – London and Aberystwyth – Carmarthen service, which he closed. It was previously called The Railway until the 1990s, and in 2022 its new owner renamed it The Hoptimist, claiming that it wanted to bring people together, not isolate them.
- The Beechings Way industrial estate at Alford, Lincolnshire is so named to commemorate the loss of the former station - whose buildings lie within the estate - and line (formerly from Grimsby to London, via Louth and Peterborough) under the Beeching cuts.
- The road Beeching Drive in Lowestoft, Suffolk, located on the site of the former Lowestoft North station is also so named. Coincidentally, a smaller pedestrian area in the vicinity is known as Stephenson's Walk.
- The old station approach in the village of Upton, Oxfordshire, is now a cul-de-sac called Beeching Close.
- There is a cul-de-sac in the Leicestershire village of Countesthorpe about 7 mi (11 km) south of Leicester city centre aptly named Beeching's Close. Countesthorpe railway station was served by the former Midland Counties Railway line between Leicester and Rugby, although this was closed in January 1962, well over a year prior to the publication of The Reshaping of British Railways. The gardens of the houses on the west side of the close meet the boundary of the old line.
- East Grinstead, where Beeching lived, was formerly served by a railway line from Tunbridge Wells (West) to Three Bridges, most of which was closed. To the east of the current East Grinstead station, the line passed through a deep cutting. This cutting currently forms part of the A22 relief road through East Grinstead. Due to the depth of the cutting, locals wanted to call the road Beeching Cut, but it was decided to call it Beeching Way.

A popular BBC sitcom, Oh, Doctor Beeching!, broadcast between 1995 and 1997, was set at a rural railway station in the shadow of the Beeching reforms.

== Arms ==
Coat of arms of Richard Beeching
Crest A cubit arm erect vested Sable cuffed Argent the hand Proper supporting a sword sheathed point upwards Gules hilt pommel quillons and chape Or and grasping two arrows in saltire points upward Or all between two branches of beech Proper. Escutcheon Gules on a bend double cotised Or three beech leaves Vert a chief Ermine. Supporters On either side a lion that to the dexter Gules the sinister Or each charged on the shoulder with an annulet enclosing two bars wavy counter-changed and resting the interior hind paw on a rock Proper. Motto Straight Down The Middle

Business positions
Preceded by Sir Brian Robertson	Chairman of the British Transport Commission; 1961–1963	BTC abolished
New title	Chairman of the British Railways Board; 1963–1965	Succeeded by Sir Stanley Raymond
