= Frank Ewart Smith =

- Born: 31 May 1897; Loughton, Essex, UK
- Died: 14 June 1995 (aged 98)
- Education: Sidney Sussex, Cambridge
- Known for: PIAT
- Awards: John Wimbolt Prize, FRS
- Scientific career
- Fields: Metallurgical Engineering; Military Science
- Workplaces: University of Cambridge, Fort Halstead

Sir Frank Ewart Smith FRS (31 May 1897 – 14 June 1995), known as Sir Ewart Smith was a scholar, military scientist, and technical director, then Deputy Chairman of Imperial Chemical Industries

== Early life ==
Ewart Smith, the son of a pharmacist, was born in Loughton, Essex, but grew up in Hastings, East Sussex. From the age of nine he was educated at Uckfield Grammar School, then when he was twelve won a scholarship to Christ's Hospital. Gaining a scholarship to Sidney Sussex College, Cambridge, in 1915 to read Natural Sciences, he did not go up to Cambridge until 1919, first joining the Royal Artillery during the First World War and seeing active service at Messines and Ypres. He went on to gain a first in Mechanical Engineering in an unusually short time, and stayed on as a postgraduate to study phase changes in iron, for which he was awarded the John Wimbolt prize.

== Second World War ==
By 1931, Ewart Smith was Technical Director of ICI's chemical plant at Billingham, County Durham. In the lead up to war, ICI had planned for the production of fuel and explosives, with which Ewart Smith assisted. During the war itself he served in the Government appointed role of Chief Engineer, & Superintendent of Armament Design (CEAD) for the Ministry of Supply at Fort Halstead, where he had a leading role in the design of PIAT, for armour piercing, which was the British equivalent to the American Bazooka in use into the 1950s. His military science experience when reading intelligence reports led him in 1943 to predict the development and deployment of long range rockets by Germany. Fortunately, he had Winston Churchill's ear, and V-2 launch sites were targeted by Allied forces.

== Business career ==
In 1959 Ewart Smith retired as Deputy Chairman of ICI.

== The Beeching cuts ==
During his time as CEAD, Ewart Smith recruited an able, young metallurgist to work for him, Richard Beeching. After the war, Beeching went on to continue working for Ewart Smith at ICI. When in retirement Ewart Smith was asked to serve on the Stedeford Committee to recommend a solution to the dire finances of British Transport, Ewart Smith instead recommended Beeching for his powerful ability to analyse problems. Beeching infamously went on to recommend the closure of one-third of the Britain's railway stations.

== Awards ==
He was elected a Fellow of the Royal Society (FRS) in 1957.
