= Hugh James Rose =

English Anglican priest and theologian (1795–1838)

The Reverend Hugh James Rose
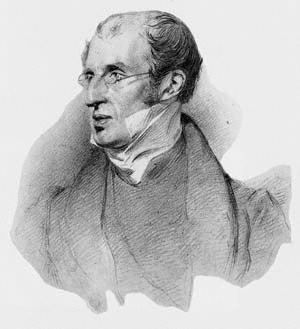
- Born: 9 June 1795; Little Horsted, England
- Died: 22 December 1838 (aged 43); Florence, Italy
- Office: Principal of King's College, London (1836–1838)
- Spouse: Anne Cuyler (m. 1819)
- Parents: William Rose; Susanna
- Relatives: Henry Rose (brother)

Ecclesiastical career
- Religion: Christianity (Anglican)
- Church: Church of England
- Ordained: 1818 (deacon); 1819 (priest)

Academic background
- Education: Trinity College, Cambridge
- Influences: William Wordsworth

Academic work
- Discipline: Theology
- School or tradition: High-church Anglicanism
- Institutions: University of Durham; King's College, London
- Influenced: George Hills

Hugh James Rose (9 June 1795 – 22 December 1838) was an English Anglican priest and theologian who served as the second Principal of King's College, London.

== Life ==
Rose was born at Little Horsted in Sussex on 9 June 1795 and educated at Uckfield School, where his father was Master, and at Trinity College, Cambridge, where he was conferred the degree of Bachelor of Arts in 1817, but missed a fellowship. He was then President of the Cambridge Union Society for the Michaelmas term of 1817. Having been ordained to the deaconate in 1818, he was appointed to a curacy in Buxted, Sussex, in 1819. He married Anne Cuyler and became a priest later that year. In 1821, he was appointed to the vicarage of Horsham, Sussex.

After travelling in Germany, as select preacher at Cambridge, Rose delivered four addresses against rationalism. In 1827 he was appointed to the prebendary of Middleton, which he held until 1833. In 1830 he accepted the rectory of Hadleigh, Suffolk, and in 1833 that of Fairsted, Essex, and in 1835 the perpetual curacy of St Thomas's, Southwark. Rose was a high churchman, who in 1832 founded the British Magazine to propagate his views, and so came into touch with the leaders of the Oxford Movement. Out of a conference at his rectory in Hadleigh, Suffolk came the Association of Friends of the Church, formed by Hurrell Froude and William Palmer.

In 1833–1834 Rose was professor of divinity at the University of Durham, a post which had to resign due to ill-health. He was appointed Principal of King's College, London, in October 1836, but caught influenza, and after two years of ill-health he died in Florence, Italy, on 22 December 1838. He was buried in the English Cemetery, Florence, his name in the register given as "Ugo Giacomo Rose", his Scipio tomb having a lengthy epitaph in Latin. Rose's library was sold at auction in London by R. H. Evans on 28 February 1839 (and five following days); a copy of the catalogue is held at Cambridge University Library (shelfmark Munby.c.145(1)).

== Works ==
In 1825 Rose published The State of the Protestant Religion in Germany. The book was severely criticised in Germany, and in England by Edward Pusey. Together with William Rowe Lyall he edited Rivington's Theological Library (1832–46). In 1836 he became editor of the Encyclopædia Metropolitana, and he projected the A New General Biographical Dictionary, a scheme carried through by his brother Henry John Rose (1800–1873).

Academic offices
Preceded by William Otter	Principal of King's College, London; 1836–1838	Succeeded by John Lonsdale
