= Henry Rose (priest) =

English theologian, archdeacon of Bedford

Henry John Rose (3 January 1800 – 31 January 1873) was an English churchman, theologian of High Church views, and scholar who became archdeacon of Bedford.

== Life ==
Born at Uckfield, Sussex, he was a younger son of William Rose (1763–1844), then curate and schoolmaster in the parish, and afterwards vicar of Glynde, Sussex; Hugh James Rose was his elder brother. He was educated at Uckfield School by his father, and admitted a pensioner at Peterhouse, Cambridge, on 25 June 1817, but migrated to St John's College on 3 October 1818. He graduated B.A. in 1821, proceeded M.A. in 1824, B.D. in 1831, and on 26 June 1851 was admitted ad eundem at Oxford. On 6 April 1824 he was admitted to a fellowship at St John's, Cambridge, and held it until April 1838, residing in the college until about 1836 and studying classics and divinity. He became a Germanist and Hebrew scholar, and at a later date mastered Syriac. For a short time (March 1832 to September 1833) he was minister of St Edward's, Cambridge, and in 1833 was Hulsean lecturer.

In the summer of 1834 Rose discharged the duties of his brother Hugh, who was in ill-health, as divinity professor in Durham University, and about 1836 he came to London and worked for his brother in the parish of St Thomas, Southwark. In 1837 he was appointed by his college to the rectory of Houghton Conquest, near Ampthill in Bedfordshire, and in 1866 obtained the archdeaconry of Bedford, preferments that he held until his death. At Houghton he superintended the renovation of the school-buildings and the restoration of the church. There Rose's brother-in-law, John William Burgon, passed his long vacations for about thirty years, and many English and continental scholars made the acquaintanceship of the rector.

Rose was a churchman of the conservative type. He was also a collector of books and an industrious writer. His library included many of Bishop George Berkeley's manuscripts, which he allowed Alexander Campbell Fraser to edit. He died on 31 January 1873, and was buried in the south-eastern angle of the churchyard at Houghton Conquest.

== Works ==
His separate publications were just two:

- The Law of Moses in connection with the History and Character of the Jews, Hulsean Lectures, 1834, and
- Answer to the Case of the Dissenters, 1834.

He helped with his brother's edition of John Parkhurst's Greek and English Lexicon of the New Testament (1829), and edited for him from about 1836 the British Magazine. For his brother he also edited the first volume of Rose's New General Biographical Dictionary, the preface being dated from Houghton Conquest in February 1840. He also edited later volumes.

He was one of the joint editors of the Encyclopædia Metropolitana, and wrote portions of the work. In the cabinet edition of that encyclopædia his name is given as one of the authors of the History of the Christian Church from the Thirteenth Century to the Present Day, and he reprinted in 1858 his article on Ecclesiastical History from 1700 to 1815.

He translated August Neander's History of the Christian Religion and Church during the Three First Centuries, vol. i. (1831) and vol. ii. (1841). He also wrote the second essay in the Replies to Essays and Reviews (1862), dealing with Bunsen, the Critical School, and Dr. Williams. He and his brother-in-law John Burgon published The Book of Common Prayer: With Illustrations Chiefly from the Old Masters in 1852. He was engaged on John Evelyn Denison's Commentary on the Bible, contributed to William Smith's Dictionary of the Bible, to the Quarterly Review, ‘English Review, and Contemporary Review, the Literary Churchman, and the Transactions of the Bedfordshire Archæological Society (on Bishop Berkeley's manuscripts); and he was one of the revisers of the authorised version of the Old Testament.

== Family ==
He married, at St Pancras New Church, on 24 May 1838, Sarah Caroline (1812–1889), eldest daughter of Thomas Burgon of the British Museum, and sister of John William Burgon, dean of Chichester. Their children were two sons, Hugh James and William Francis (both in holy orders), and three daughters.

== Notes ==
Attribution

This article incorporates text from a publication now in the public domain: "Rose, Henry John". Dictionary of National Biography. London: Smith, Elder & Co. 1885–1900.

Church of England titles
Preceded by Henry Tattam	Archdeacon of Bedford; 1866-1873	Succeeded by Frederick Bathurst
