= Brian Robertson, 1st Baron Robertson of Oakridge =

British Army general (1896–1974)

General The Right Honourable The Lord Robertson of Oakridge GCB GBE KCMG KCVO DSO MC DL
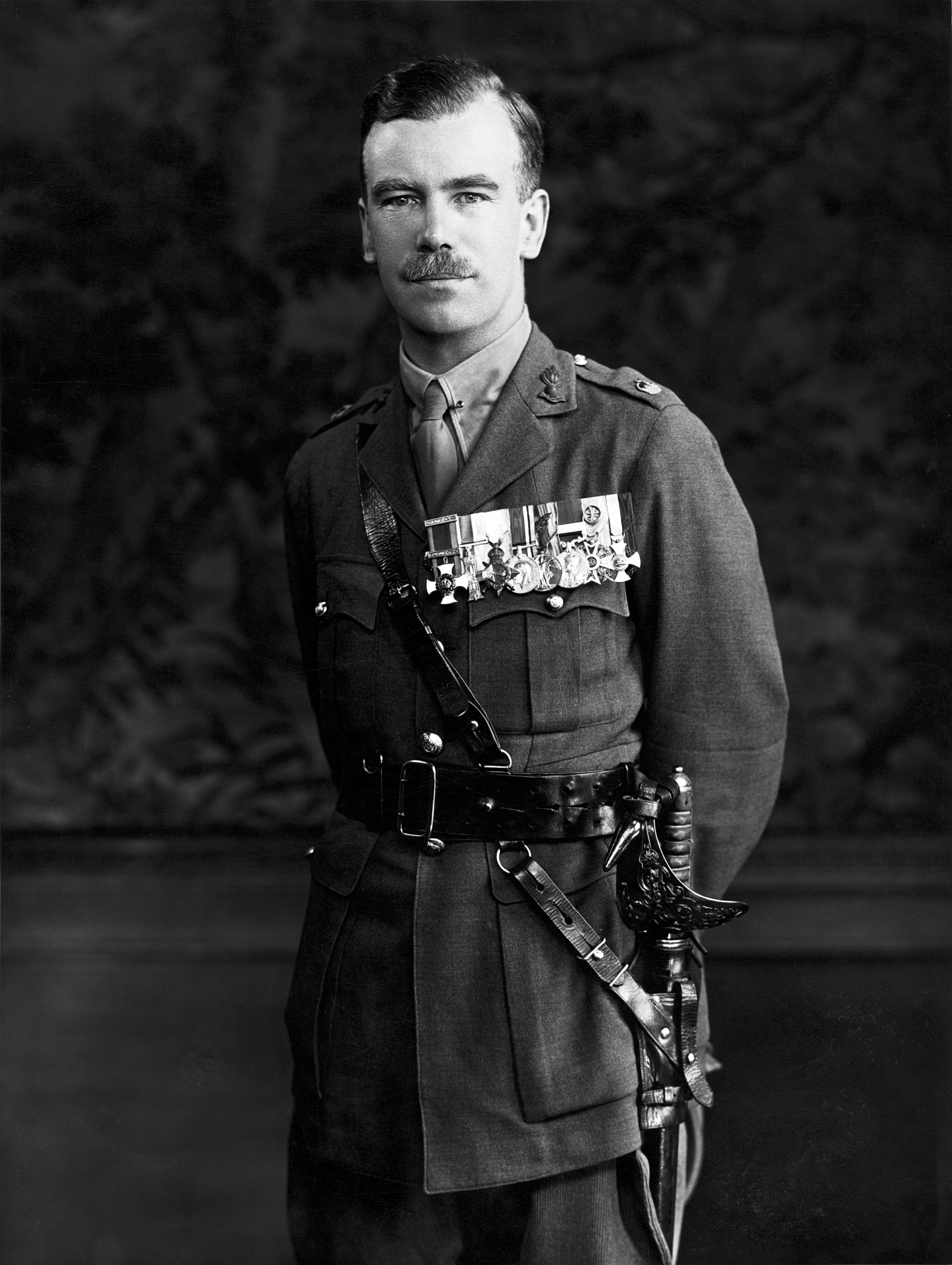
- Robertson in 1934
- Born: 22 July 1896; Simla, India
- Died: 29 April 1974 (aged 77); Oakridge, Gloucestershire, England
- Relatives: Field Marshal Sir William Robertson (father)
- Military career
- Allegiance: United Kingdom; Union of South Africa
- Branch: British Army; South African Army
- Service years: 1914–1934; 1940–1953
- Rank: General
- Service number: 179806
- Unit: Royal Engineers
- Commands: Middle East Land Forces (1950–53)
- Conflicts: First World War: Western Front; Italian Front; Operations in Waziristan (1921–1924); Second World War: East African Campaign; North African Campaign; Italian Campaign
- Awards: Knight Grand Cross of the Order of the Bath; Knight Grand Cross of the Order of the British Empire; Knight Commander of the Order of St Michael and St George; Knight Commander of the Royal Victorian Order; Companion of the Distinguished Service Order; Military Cross; Mentioned in Despatches (7); Knight of the Order of the Crown (Italy); Order of the Crown (Romania); Commander of the Legion of Honour (France); Commander of the Legion of Merit (United States)
- Other work: Chairman of the British Transport Commission (1953–61)

General Brian Hubert Robertson, 1st Baron Robertson of Oakridge, GCB, GBE, KCMG, KCVO, DSO, MC, DL (22 July 1896 – 29 April 1974) was a senior British Army officer during the Second World War, who played an important role in the East African, North African and Italian Campaigns. After the war he was the Deputy Military Governor of Germany from 1945 to 1948, and then the Military Governor from 1948 to 1949.

The son of Field Marshal Sir William Robertson, he was educated at Charterhouse and the Royal Military Academy, Woolwich. He was commissioned as a second lieutenant in the Royal Engineers in November 1914, and served on the Western Front and Italian Front during the First World War. He was awarded the Military Cross in 1918 and appointed a Companion of the Distinguished Service Order in 1919. After the war he served with the Bengal Sappers and Miners from 1920 to 1925 and took part in the Waziristan expedition of 1923 to 1924. Following his father's death in February 1933, he succeeded him in his baronetcy. He retired from the Army in early 1934 to become the managing director of Dunlop Rubber in South Africa.

With the outbreak of the Second World War, Robertson re-entered military service in 1940 as a lieutenant-colonel in the South African Army. He served in East and North Africa, and Italy until the end of the war, notably as Harold Alexander's Chief Administrative Officer in Italy. He was promoted to brigadier by 1942 with the temporary rank of major-general from 1944 to 1945. Field Marshal Bernard Montgomery considered Robertson the best chief of administration in the British Army.

Robertson was restored to the Active List in October 1945 as a substantive major-general, becoming a lieutenant-general in 1946 and full general in 1947. He was Commander-in-Chief of Middle East Land Forces from 1950 to 1953, when he retired from military service for the second time to become Chairman of the British Transport Commission, a post he held until 1961. That year he was raised to the peerage as Baron Robertson of Oakridge, of Oakridge in the County of Gloucester.

== Early life ==
Brian Hubert Robertson was born in Simla, India, on 22 July 1896, the son of William Robertson, a captain in the British Army, and his wife Mildred Adelaide (née Palin), the second daughter of Lieutenant-Colonel Charles Thomas Palin, an officer in the Bombay Staff Corps. Charles Palin would rise to become a lieutenant-general; William Robertson would become the only man to rise from private to field marshal going through every rank in between (in other words, he did not enlist as a private and then go on to officer training), and become Chief of the Imperial General Staff, the highest position in the army. Brian had three younger siblings: his sisters Rosamund, born in 1901, and Helen, born in 1905, and a younger brother, John, who was born in 1909. An older brother, Hubert, died in infancy. Like most military families, they moved frequently as his father was posted on various assignments.

Robertson was educated at Tanllwyfan, a preparatory school in Wales. In 1908, he transferred to Pinewood School, which was then in Hampshire, and was a feeder school for Winchester College. Given the family's financial situation, Robertson's only chance of attending Winchester was to win a scholarship. This he failed to do; but he secured a £39 per annum scholarship to Charterhouse in 1910. The scholarship was good only until he turned sixteen, but in 1912 he was awarded a senior scholarship, and moved on to the Army Division of the sixth form, to study for the entrance examination for the Royal Military Academy, Woolwich, the British Army's academy for engineers and gunners. His father believed that this would prove a better military education than the Royal Military Academy, Sandhurst, which trained officers for the infantry and cavalry, in an Army and a century dominated by technological change. At Charterhouse he joined the Rifle Corps, a school cadet unit that provided some military training. He passed the Woolwich entrance examination in 1913, ranked tenth.

== First World War ==
The outbreak of the First World War in August 1914 caused the course at Woolwich to be truncated, and Robertson, who graduated fourth in his class, was commissioned as a second lieutenant in the Royal Engineers on 17 November 1914. On 29 November he reported to the School of Military Engineering at Chatham for a two-month course in military engineering. He was then sent to Aldershot for a 12-week course at the Signals Depot. On completion of this training in April 1915, his father, now the Chief of Staff of the British Expeditionary Force (BEF) on the Western Front, had him assigned to his own staff as an aide de camp (ADC). This provided a good introduction to the workings of a military staff. When his father left in December 1915 to become the Chief of the Imperial General Staff, Robertson became an aide to the Commander-in-Chief of the BEF, General Sir Douglas Haig, with the rank of lieutenant from 23 December 1915. He was mentioned in despatches on 1 January 1916. As part of the BEF staff, he was able to view the elaborate preparations for, and the early stages of, the execution of the Battle of the Somme.

In July 1916, Robertson was posted to the headquarters of the XI Corps as a General Staff Officer Grade 3 (GSO3). The commander of XI Corps, Lieutenant-General Sir Richard Haking was a friend of his father's. He was promoted to captain on 16 January 1917, and accompanied his father on a tour of the Italian Front. The XI Corps sector of the Western Front was a quiet one at this time, but Robertson was mentioned in despatches on 15 May 1917, awarded the Order of the Crown of Romania with Swords on 21 June 1917, and the Military Cross in the 1918 New Year Honours. In response to the Italian defeat in the Battle of Caporetto, XI Corps was ordered to Italy on 18 November 1917, but by the time it arrived the front had settled down, and it saw little action. For his part, Robertson was made a cavalier of the Order of the Crown of Italy. When XI Corps returned to France in March 1918, Robertson was sent to Clare College, Cambridge, to attend a staff school. On completion of this training in July, he became brigade major of the 177th Brigade, part of the 59th (2nd North Midland) Division, which was assigned to XI Corps. As such, he participated in the Hundred Days Offensive. He was appointed a Companion of the Distinguished Service Order in the 1919 Birthday Honours, and was mentioned in despatches a third time on 5 July 1919.

== Between the wars ==
After the war Robertson was posted back to Brompton Barracks to complete his interrupted engineering studies. In November 1920, he commenced a five-year secondment to the British Indian Army, on assignment to the Bengal Sappers and Miners, based at Roorkee, about 100 miles (160 km) north of Delhi. He assumed command of its 3rd Field Company, with Lieutenant Ian Jacob as his second in command in April 1921, and the company moved to Peshawar in the North-West Frontier Province. In the wake of the 1919–1920 Waziristan campaign, the Army had decided to establish a permanent garrison at Razmak, and to support the operations in Waziristan, construction of a new gravel road was required. Robertson's company was ordered to work on the road in November 1921. The road traversed some of the most remote, rugged and inhospitable terrain in India. The work was completed in October 1923, and was inspected by General Lord Rawlinson. For his work on the road, Robertson was mentioned in despatches twice more.

The 3rd Field Company returned to Peshawar in October 1923, and Robertson was granted seven months' leave, commencing in April 1924. He returned to his family's home in Bayswater, where he bought a car, studied for the entrance examinations to the Staff College, Camberley, saw Edith Macindoe, whom he had met at a party in Scotland before his posting to India, and was best man at Jacob's wedding. He returned to Peshawar in December 1924, where he sat the staff college examinations in February 1925. Three weeks beforehand, he was hospitalised with a fever, and did not think he had performed well on the exams. Nonetheless, he was breveted as a major on 13 March 1925, and in April General Sir Claude Jacob, the acting Commander-in-Chief, India, (and Ian Jacob's father) asked Robertson to become his ADC. In June, Robertson received the news that he had been offered a place at Camberley.

Robertson returned to England in December 1925, and commenced the two-year course at Camberley. He married Edith Macindoe on 4 August 1926. They had three children. Staff college training was normally followed by a staff posting, and Robertson was posted to the Quartermaster General's Department at the War Office. After three months there, he was transferred to the Directorate of Military Operations and Intelligence (DMO&I), where he specialised in South America. In 1929, he visited six South American countries—Argentina, Bolivia, Chile, Ecuador, Peru and Uruguay—on a fact-finding tour. In his report, he noted that in four of these countries military training was being conducted by German military missions, and argued that military attachés should be posted to South America. The War Office and Foreign Office agreed, but HM Treasury did not, and the result was that the military attaché to the United States was also accredited to South American countries.

Robertson was promoted to the substantive rank of major on 11 January 1930. In February 1932, he became a military advisor to the British delegation to the League of Nations conference on disarmament in Geneva, along with Lieutenant-Colonel Christopher Dawnay and Brigadier Arthur Temperley. His father died on 12 February 1933, and he inherited the baronetcy. The disarmament conference was a failure; negotiations stalled, and on 14 October 1933, the new Chancellor of Germany, Adolf Hitler, announced that Germany was withdrawing from the League of Nations. Robertson's next posting was back to India as an instructor at the Staff College, Quetta, but he decided, in view of the dismal prospects for promotion in the Army, to retire on half pay and accept an offer from Eric Geddes to manage a Dunlop Rubber factory in South Africa. The officer sent in his place died in the 1935 Quetta earthquake.

The tyre factory in Durban was a brand new one, opened by the Prime Minister of South Africa, General James Hertzog on 13 August 1935. Until 1937, Robertson was nominally the assistant to Malcolm Irving, the company's managing director in South Africa, but owing to Irving's poor health, Robertson ran the factory from the beginning. The business was successful, with the factory generating a 12.6 per cent profit in 1936. He became an influential member of the local business community, and was elected Chairman of the Rubber Growers' Association in 1936, and President of the Natal Chamber of Industry in 1938.

== Second World War ==
=== East African Campaign ===
The outbreak of the Second World War in Europe in September 1939 prompted Hertzog to resign rather than support the war. Robertson was a strong supporter, urging members of the Natal Chamber of Industries to release army reservists. In November 1939, he resigned to rejoin the British Army. He had long assumed that he could easily do so, but the War Office rejected his offer, on the grounds that he was too old. He therefore offered his services to the Union Defence Force (UDF), which accepted him, as it was short of trained staff officers. He was commissioned as a lieutenant-colonel in the South African Army on 1 February 1940, and was sent to the South African Staff College in May. He passed the course easily, and was ranked first in his class of 23. On 16 June, he embarked for Mombasa.

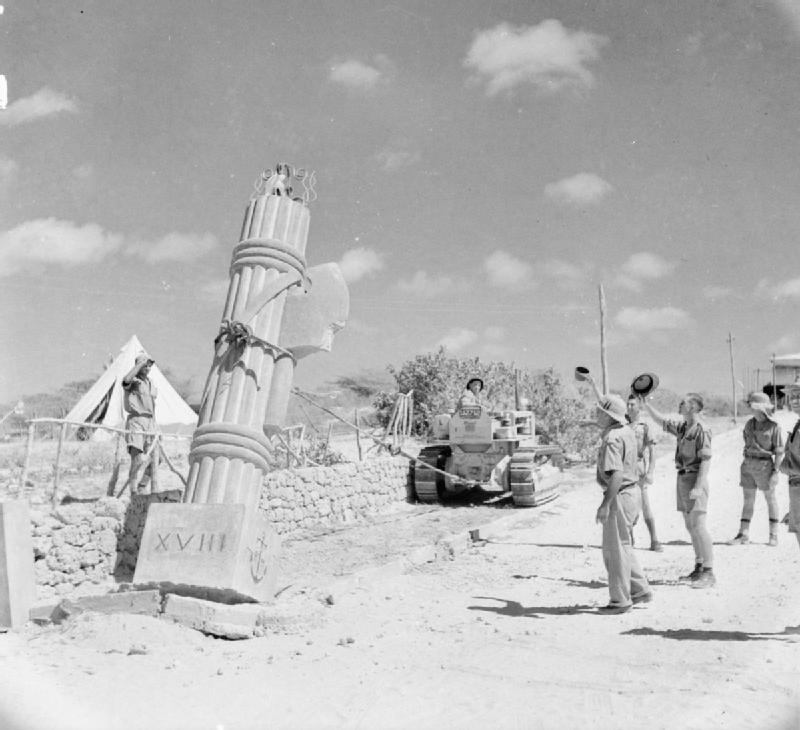
British troops demolish an Italian monument at Kismayu on 11 April 1941

Kenya was threatened by Italy's declaration of war on Britain on 10 June 1940, because Kenya was a British colony, and Italy occupied neighbouring Ethiopia and Somalia. In response to appeals for assistance from Britain, the new Prime Minister of South Africa, Jan Smuts, sent the 1st Infantry Brigade Group to Kenya in July, followed by the South African 1st Infantry Division in November. When Robertson arrived in Nairobi, he joined the staff of Major-General D. P. Dickinson's East Africa Force as its Assistant Quartermaster General (AQMG), working under the Deputy Quartermaster General (DQMG), Colonel Alan Duff. The Kenya and Uganda Railway had ample capacity to move supplies from the base depots as far as Thika and Nanyuki; but these railheads were a long way from the frontier. There were two roads: one from Thika to Garissa and thence to Kismayu in Somalia; and one from Nanyuki to Wajir, and thence to Bardera in Somalia. They were passable only by light vehicles in dry weather, but work commenced on improving them when the war began. Forward supply bases were established at Bura and Garissa. The dominant problem was the supply of water; at the bases it was obtained from the Tana River, but forward of that it was scarce, and water obtained by boring was brackish. When not at headquarters, Robertson sited dumps, arranged for water supplies, and investigated delays at the railhead at Thika.

In view of these difficulties, Lieutenant-General Alan Cunningham, who assumed command of East Africa Force on 1 November 1940, postponed operations until after the spring rains. However, the success of Lieutenant-General Richard O'Connor's operation in the Libyan Desert and Lieutenant-General William Platt's in Eritrea convinced him that the operation could be attempted with fewer troops than he originally contemplated, and the campaign began on 11 February 1941. Kismayu was occupied on 14 February, opening up a sea line of communications to replace the road from Thika. This was followed by the capture of Mogadishu on 23 February, but its development as a port was delayed because the Royal Navy had sown the harbour with magnetic mines, which it lacked the ability to clear. The small port of Merca was therefore developed as a temporary base until Mogadishu was opened in March. The offer of rewards to local civilians for the disclosure of the whereabouts of fuel supplies yielded 350,000 imperial gallons (1,600,000 L) of petrol and 80,000 imperial gallons (360,000 L) of aviation spirit.

There was no respite for Duff and Robertson to accumulate supplies, as Cunningham decided to press on to Addis Ababa. To support this, a new line of communications was opened from Berbera, on the Gulf of Aden, thereby saving 540 miles (870 km). Robertson reported to Cunningham that "the distance from Mogadishu to Berbera was 600 miles. A very fine tarmac road was marked on Italian maps but did not exist after a few miles out of Mogadishu." Addis Ababa was captured on 6 April. Robertson flew up to the headquarters of the 11th and 12th African Divisions on 12 April, and was bombarded with urgent requests, which he struggled to fulfil. Despite the difficulties, the new Berbera line of communications carried an average of 450 long tons (460 t) per day between 18 May and 6 July, by which time the Italians had surrendered. In his report, Cunningham wrote of Duff and Robertson: "I found them undaunted by the magnitude of the demands made on them. That throughout the vicissitudes of bad roads and ports without appliances, ample supplies were able to keep up with the troops, must be accounted a fine achievement by these two officers." Robertson was mentioned in despatches.

=== North African Campaign ===
With the campaign in East Africa over, Robertson returned to Mombasa on 17 July, and then flew to Cairo in August, where he became Administrative Chief of the South African Defence Force in the Middle East, with the rank of brigadier. However, Cunningham was forming a new headquarters, which was called Western Army on 11 September, and renamed Eighth Army on 27 September, and he asked Robertson to become AQMG. Robertson readily accepted, even though it meant dropping in rank back to lieutenant-colonel, but a request to South Africa to release him for this duty met with a refusal from the Chief of the General Staff of the UDF. When his deputy visited Cairo, Cunningham and the Commander-in-Chief Middle East, General Sir Claude Auchinleck, approached him and asked for Robertson's release, which had the desired effect. He was formally seconded as AQMG on 19 September, with Brigadier Charles Miller as his superior, the Deputy Adjutant and Quartermaster General (DA&QMG).

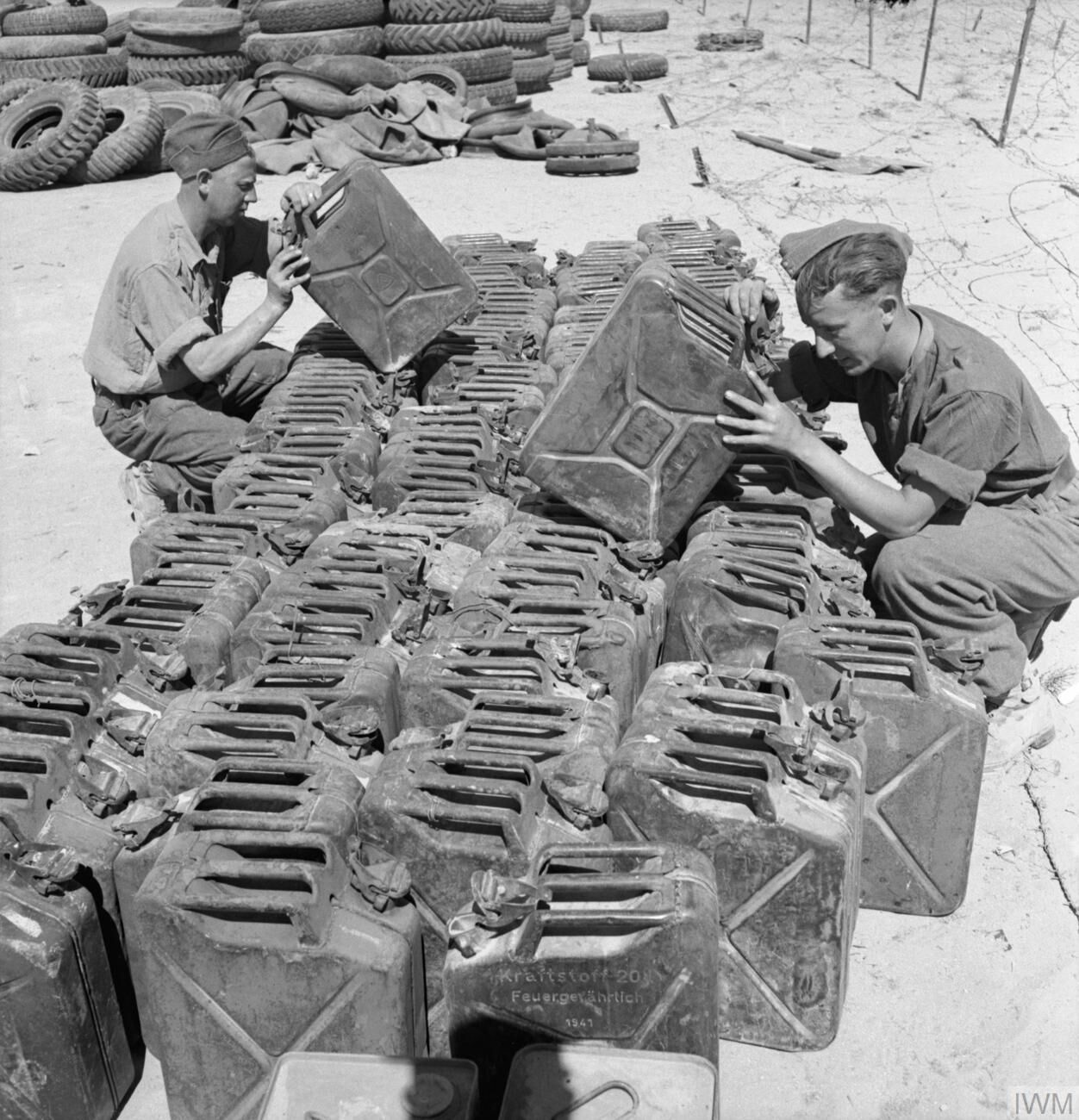
Salvaged German jerricans being inspected at a depot in the Western Desert, 21 April 1942. These were far superior to the British 4-imperial-gallon (18 L) flimsy tins.

The immediate task was preparing for Operation Crusader, the Eighth Army's offensive against the German and Italian army in Libya. The maintenance of its 118,000 men and 17,600 vehicles required 8,000 long tons (8,100 t) of supplies per day. The railway was extended from Mersa Matruh to Bir Mischeifa, and a water pipeline was extended forward of Mersa Matruh. Over 150,000 imperial gallons (680,000 L) of water was stored in the forward area, and three forward bases were stocked with over 33,000 long tons (34,000 t) of stores. The transport engaged in stocking the forward bases alone consumed 180,000 imperial gallons (820,000 L) per day.

Robertson developed the concept of the Field Maintenance Centre (FMC) for the support of fast-moving mobile operations. An FMC was like a military shopping centre, supplying all the needs of a corps, and dramatically reduced the response time to administrative needs of front line units and reduced the amount of paperwork that they needed to do to get their needs fulfilled. The FMC would later become a feature of war in the desert, and later British logistics in the Normandy Campaign. The offensive was launched on 18 November. While the Germans were taken by surprise, they soon recovered, and pushed the Eighth Army back. On 24 November, the Afrika Korps threatened the railhead at Mischeifa and the Eighth Army's Rear HQ, which Robertson was ordered to defend. Fortunately for him, the Afrika Korps changed direction. But although the tactical situation was poor, the administrative situation remained good, and this influenced Auchinleck to continue the battle. Auchinleck relieved Cunningham of his command, and replaced him with Lieutenant-General Neil Ritchie.

The Germans and Italians fell back in December. To support the advance, the ports in Libya needed to be developed. Robertson went to Tobruk on 13 January to investigate increasing its capacity. He concluded that the problem was the poor layout of the depots, and recommended that they be reorganised. Benghazi was captured on 24 December, and became the key port, being much closer to the front than Tobruk. The logistical challenge was to build up sufficient reserves to be able to deliver an attack on the German and Italian positions around El Agheila. On 21 January 1942, the Germans and Italians struck back. Benghazi was abandoned, and the Eighth Army fell back on Gazala. Tobruk was now the main port, but Miller and Robertson considered it too far forward to stock with more than a week's supplies. They were overridden by Auchinleck, who wanted it stocked for a renewed offensive. But the Eighth Army lost the Battle of Gazala, which began on 26 May. On 2 June, Miller became the Eighth Army's Brigadier, General Staff (BGS), and Robertson took his place as DA&QMG, with the rank of brigadier once more. When Tobruk fell on 22 June, 3,000,000 rations, 4,000 long tons (4,100 t) of ammunition and 1,750,000 long tons (1,780,000 t) of petrol, oil and lubricants (POL) were lost. Following another defeat in the Battle of Mersa Matruh, the Eighth Army fell back to El Alamein.

In August 1942, General Harold Alexander replaced Auchinleck as Commander-in-Chief Middle East, and Lieutenant-General Bernard Montgomery became commander of the Eighth Army. Robertson knew both well; Alexander had been a fellow student at Camberley, and Montgomery had been an instructor, having been nominated to attend staff college by Robertson's father. Lieutenant-General Sir Wilfrid Lindsell, the Chief Administrative Officer at Middle East HQ had also been one of his instructors. Robertson was happy to go along with Montgomery's organisation of the staff under which the head of the General Staff branch, Major-General Freddie de Guingand acted as a chief of staff, controlling both administration and operations. Robertson was still permitted direct access to Montgomery when he requested it, a privilege that he did not exercise often. For his part in the earlier campaigns, Robertson was made a Commander of the Order of the British Empire in September. "What gave me confidence," he wrote to his wife, "more than anything else was Monty's attitudes and methods. To watch him on his job is like watching a test match played after watching just good club performance."

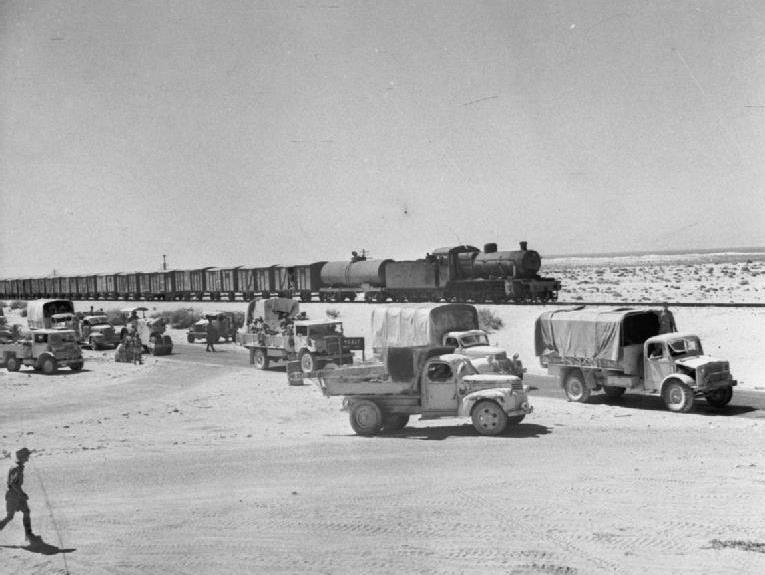
A railway train and lorries are used to ferry supplies during the retreat of the Eighth Army into Egypt

Elaborate preparations were made for the Second Battle of El Alamein, not just for the battle itself, but for the subsequent pursuit. Seven days' supplies and 50,000 imperial gallons (230,000 L) of POL for X Corps were stored in forward dumps, along with five days' supplies for XIII Corps and XXX Corps. The forward dumps held 268,000 rounds of 25-pounder, 12,800 rounds of 4.5-inch and 6,400 rounds of 5-5-inch ammunition, together with four days' supply of other ammunition. Three days' supply of stores, ammunition and POL were held at the railhead, and another 14,000 long tons (14,000 t) of ammunition at 4 Advanced Ammunition Depot in Alexandria. On the eve of the battle, Robertson was hospitalised with pneumonia, but he returned to duty on 26 October, to oversee the Eighth Army's pursuit. Tobruk fell on 13 November, and Robertson visited it the following day. The first ship unloaded there on 16 November. Benghazi fell on 20 November, and Tripoli on 21 January 1943. Between 14 and 17 February, Montgomery held a conference in Tripoli on the lessons of the campaign, with lectures from various participants, that was attended by senior British and American officers. Robertson was given two hours to talk about the logistics. His role was also recognised by his being made a Companion of the Order of the Bath on 26 February 1943, and mentioned in despatches. On 28 February, he was promoted to the acting rank of major-general. Considering the lesson of the campaign, Robertson said:

An Army Commander clearly is always looking ahead. He wants to know what he can do within the limits of administrative possibilities. The Deputy Adjutant and Quartermaster-General must know sufficient of his administrative situation to be able to give an immediate answer in general terms. It is most important that this administrative answer should be reasonably accurate. On it the general will frame his plan in more detail and give his ideas on the date and weight of the attack. Having said what he is going to do, a commander must not cheat. He must not "beat the pistol" nor "wangle up" additional troops nor sneak his troops further forward than he said he would. A good administrative officer does not over-issue and cannot be cheated without unfortunate consequences. Some generals have no morals. Fortunately General Montgomery does not cheat – whether that is due to his innate honesty or the fact that I watch him like a cat does not matter – and moreover, he does not let other people cheat.

At this point, headquarters of the Eighth Army and the Desert Air Force were 1,000 miles (1,600 km) from the railhead at Tobruk, and 1,200 miles (1,900 km) from GHQ Middle East in Cairo, making day-to-day coordination on logistical matters very difficult. A new staff known as HQ Tripolitania Base (or Tripbase) was created under Robertson in February 1943, and assumed responsibility for Tripolitania on 3 March. Eighth Army now sent maintenance requests to Tripolitania Base, which in turn dealt with GHQ. This meant that Robertson now received his orders from his successor at Eighth Army, Brigadier Miles Graham, who had previously been his subordinate. As commander of the Tripolitania Base, he supported the Tunisian Campaign, and was involved in the planning and execution of the Allied invasion of Sicily.

=== Italian campaign ===
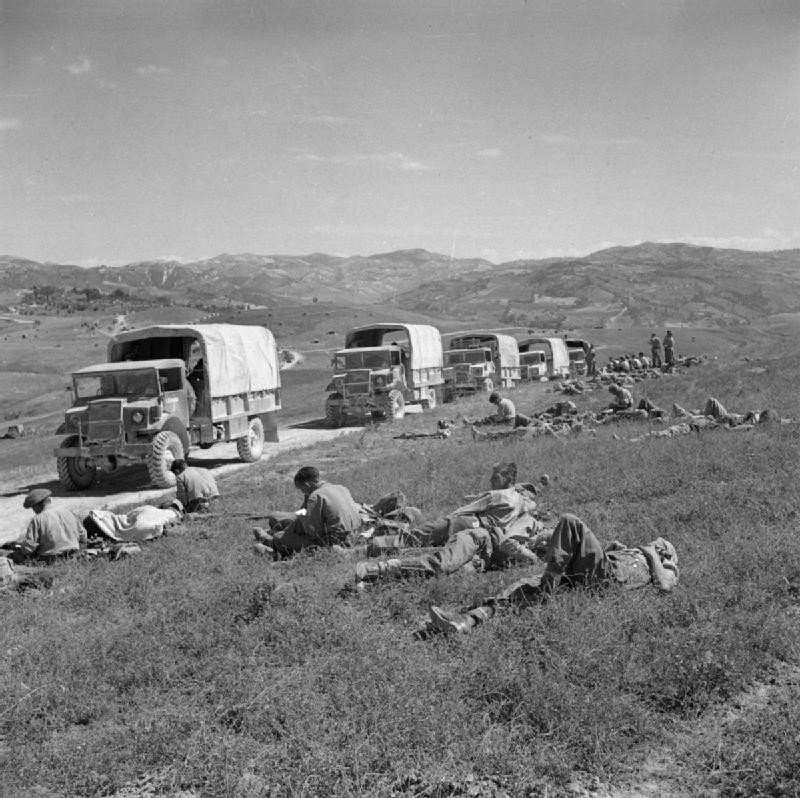
A line of supply lorries and their crews wait to move on during the breakthrough into the Gothic Line, 7 September 1944.

On 18 July 1943, Robertson arrived in Sicily with his Tripbase headquarters, which now became known as Fortbase (Forward Tripolitania Base). Fortbase was responsible for the ports and beaches in Eastern Sicily, for coordinating demands for shipping, and for mounting the Eighth Army units for the Allied invasion of Italy. From a doctrinal point of view, Fortbase usurped administrative functions that would normally have been carried out by Alexander's 15th Army Group, where Miller was now the Chief Administrative Officer, but most of the British units in Sicily had formed part of the Eighth Army, and were accustomed to its methods. Fortbase was officially under the command of 15th Army Group, but Montgomery treated it as part of the Eighth Army. Robertson also had to deal with General Dwight Eisenhower's Allied Forces Headquarters, (AFHQ), where Major General Humfrey Gale was the Chief Administrative Officer. At the same time, he also had to deal with GHQ Middle East, although it was not under AFHQ, because most of the Eighth Army's support still derived from there. Starting on 20 August, ships began arriving direct from the United Kingdom and the United States, but this created more problems, as convoys carried stores that had been ordered weeks before, and congested the ports by unloading stores that were in excess of requirements or not required at all. De Guingand credited Robertson's success in organising Fortbase as a major factor in the Eighth Army being able to accelerate its advance and link up with the United States Fifth Army when the latter ran into trouble at Salerno.

Robertson succeeded Miller as Alexander's Chief Administrative Officer on 12 October 1943. He also became Gale's deputy. AFHQ Advanced Administrative Echelon headquarters, known as FLAMBO, opened in Naples on 24 October. The first serious problem he had to deal with was a shortage of 25-pounder ammunition, caused by heavier than expected fighting. Usage was rationed, and additional stocks were found in Sicily, the Middle East and North Africa. An air raid on Bari on the night of 2/3 December sank 28 ships. There were over a thousand casualties, 38,000 long tons (39,000 t) of cargo was lost, and the port was out of action for several weeks. One of the ships was carrying poison gas. Robertson complained to Gale that such ships should not be sent to Bari, but should be unloaded at a smaller port like Barletta. That month, Montgomery left to take over the 21st Army Group in the UK, and there were rumours that Robertson would join him, and Major General Cecil Miller from GHQ Middle East would replace him at 15th Army Group. This did not occur, and Robertson remained in Italy, working on Operation Shingle, the landing at Anzio in January 1944. Eisenhower and Gale departed for SHAEF, however, and were replaced at AFHQ by General Sir Henry Maitland Wilson and Major General George Clark respectively. On 28 January 1944, Robertson was promoted to the temporary rank of major-general, with the war-substantive rank of colonel. On 26 February, FLAMBO was absorbed into the HQ of 15th Army Group.

Robertson was appointed a Knight Commander of the Royal Victorian Order by King George VI on 20 July 1944, during the latter's visit to Italy. Alexander succeeded Wilson at AFHQ on 12 December, and Robertson succeeded Miller as the Chief Administrative Officer at AFHQ on 16 November, with the acting rank of lieutenant-general (effective 16 December). The ammunition shortage that occurred in October 1943 recurred in October 1944 as a result of the Gothic Line battles. Robertson flew to London to confer with the War Office about the problem, but received no satisfaction. The theatre's allotment was insufficient, and the War Office stated that it could not make up the deficiencies. Rationing was introduced, and further offensive operations had to be postponed until 1945. The same battles also created a manpower crisis, mainly in the infantry. The British Army had a global deficiency of 42,000 infantrymen, and the Mediterranean theatre was 21,000 short. To address the shortage, Alexander broke up the 1st Armoured Division and disbanded the 18th and 168th (2nd London) Brigades. Robertson tried to improve morale in what was becoming a forgotten army by increasing the beer ration, and granting one month's home leave to 3,000 men per month who had been overseas for three years or more. In February 1945, he returned to Durban on leave himself.

== Occupation of Germany ==
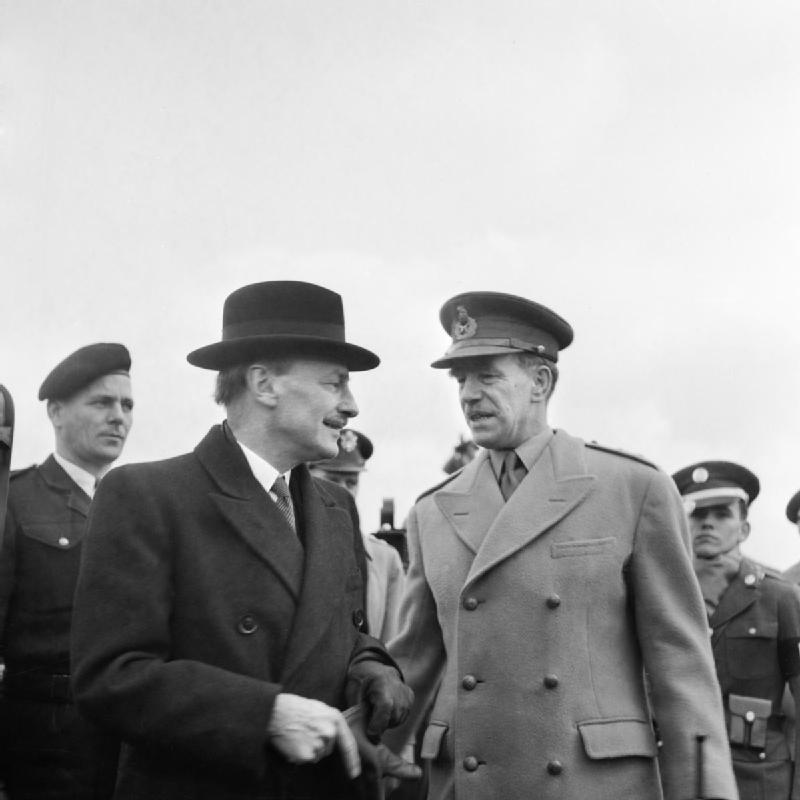
The Prime Minister, Clement Attlee, visits Tempelhof Airport to view the Berlin Airlift in operation with Robertson

At the end of July 1945, with the war in Europe over, Robertson flew to Germany to take over from Lieutenant-General Ronald Weeks as Montgomery's Chief of Staff and Deputy Military Governor of the British Occupation Zone of Germany. He also acted as Montgomery's deputy on the Allied Control Council. Robertson was restored to the British Army Active List on 30 October 1945 as a substantive major-general, with his seniority backdated to 17 November 1941. He retained his acting rank of lieutenant-general. He was subsequently promoted to the substantive rank of lieutenant-general on 1 May 1946, with seniority backdated to 12 September 1944. When Montgomery left to become CIGS in June 1946, Robertson stayed on as deputy to his successor, Marshal of the Royal Air Force Sir William Sholto Douglas. Robertson's family arrived in Berlin on 11 August 1946, moving into the Schloss Benkhausen with him, and he was able to enjoy a family life for the first time in over six years.

Montgomery promised Robertson that he would appoint him as Quartermaster General in June 1947, but when that date arrived he was forced to concede that Robertson had made himself indispensable, and there was no chance that John Hynd and Ernest Bevin would approve Robertson being moved from Germany. Robertson was made Commander of the United States Legion of Merit on 4 April 1946, and a Knight Commander of the Order of St Michael and St George in the 1947 Birthday Honours on 12 June 1947. He succeeded Douglas as Military Governor on 1 November 1947, and was promoted to full general on 17 November 1947, with seniority backdated to 3 October 1946. He attended the wedding of Princess Elizabeth and Philip Mountbatten, Duke of Edinburgh, on 20 November 1947.

Post-war Germany was in ruins. The British Zone was particularly affected, since it contained the devastated Ruhr area. It was less rural and agricultural and more urbanised and industrial than the other three zones, and did not produce enough food to feed its population, which was swollen by refugees from the East. Britain could do little to help; by June 1947, most of the Anglo-American loan that had been extended to Britain had been spent, and Britain was nearly bankrupt. In order to avert starvation in Germany, the Lord President of the Council, Herbert Morrison, negotiated a deal with the Americans whereby 675,000 long tons (686,000 t) of grain was shipped to Germany in return for a cut of 200,000 long tons (200,000 t) in shipments to Britain.

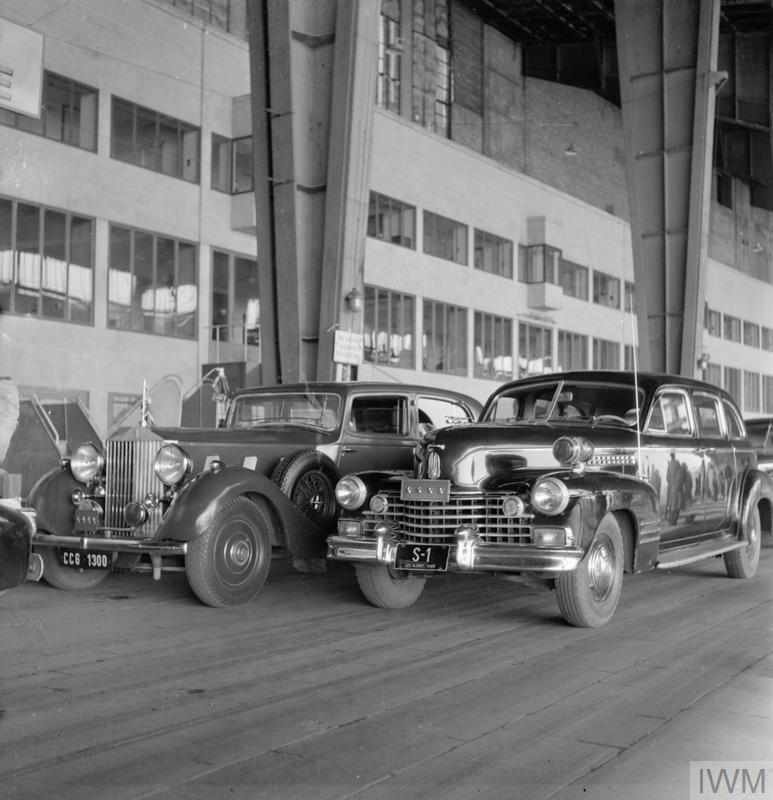
The official cars of the Commanders of American and British forces in Berlin at Tempelhof Airport. General Lucius D. Clay's Cadillac is seen parked next to Robertson's Rolls-Royce.

Britain therefore needed Germany to become self-sustaining as soon as possible, a policy that put it at odds with the other three powers. In order to shift more of the burden onto the Americans, an agreement was reached to amalgamate the British and American zones into Bizonia. The downside of this was that it gave the Americans a greater say, making it even more difficult for Robertson to reach compromises with the Soviet Union. Matters came to a head over the introduction of the Deutsche Mark as a new currency in Bizonia. When the Soviets responded with a blockade of Berlin, the American Military Governor, General Lucius D. Clay, wanted to force a convoy through by road. Robertson convinced him to adopt the Berlin Airlift instead. Unlike a force of tanks and trucks, the Soviets could not claim that cargo aircraft were some sort of military threat. In the face of unarmed aircraft refusing to turn around, the only way to enforce the blockade would have been to shoot them down. An airlift would put the Soviet Union in the position of either shooting down unarmed humanitarian aircraft, thus breaking its own agreements, or backing down. Robertson was doubtful that the airlift would provide more than a temporary solution. He went over the tonnage figures repeatedly, and arrived at the conclusion that the airlift would not be adequate. Nonetheless, the airlift succeeded, and the blockade was lifted on 12 May 1949. When the three western zones were fused to create West Germany later that month, Robertson was seconded to the foreign office as the High Commissioner at the Allied High Commission for Germany. For his services, he was made a Knight Grand Cross of the Order of the British Empire in the 1949 Birthday Honours.

== Middle East ==
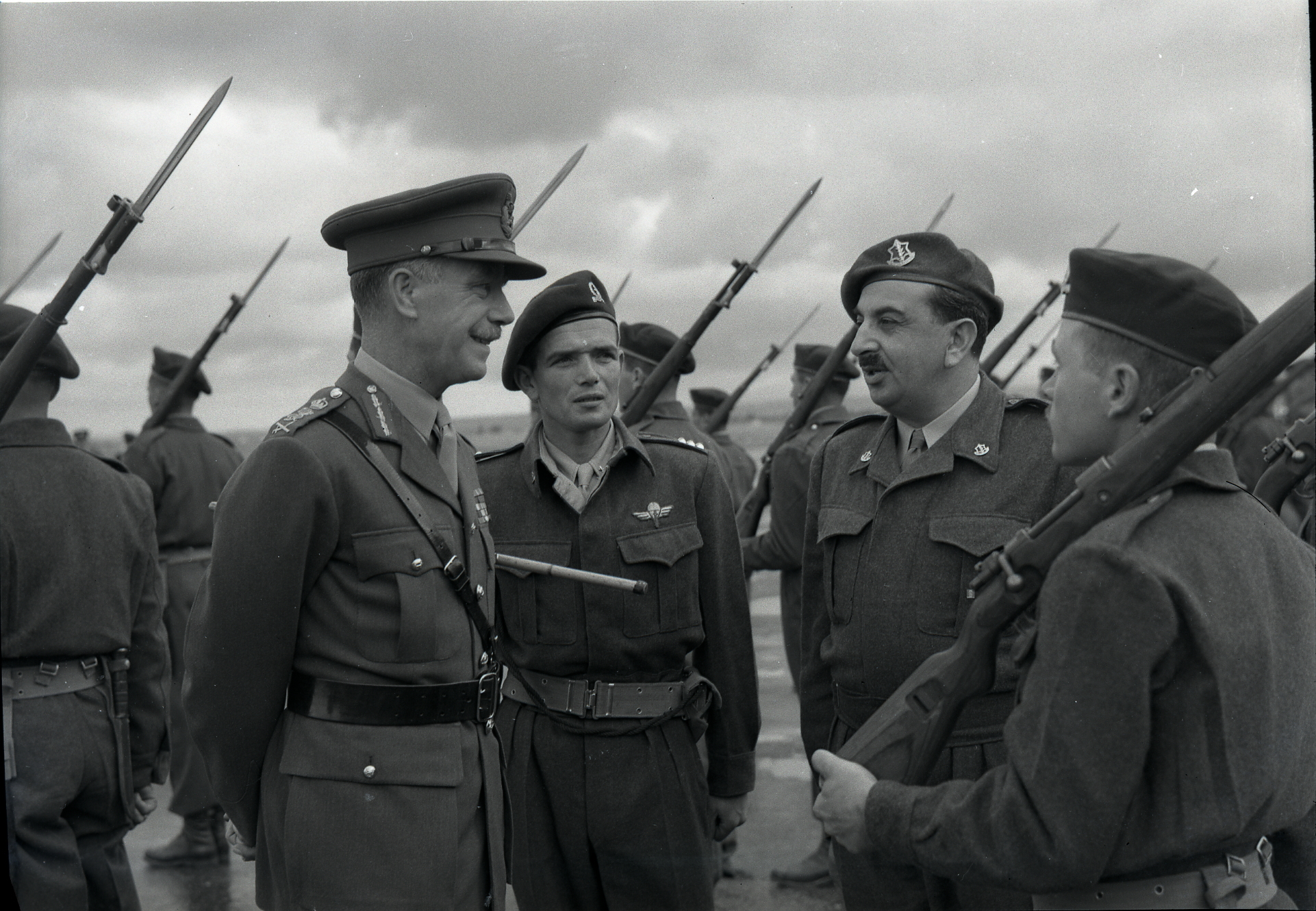
Robertson during his 1951 visit to Israel. Beno Rothenberg, Meitar collection, National Library of Israel

On 25 July 1950, Robertson became Commander-in-Chief of Middle East Land Forces. He moved with his family to a new residence at Fayed, on the shores of the Bitter Lakes. The theatre had been a primarily British responsibility in both world wars, and was still considered such by the United States, which was reluctant to assume commitments beyond those it had already undertaken in Europe and the Far East, but Britain no longer had the resources to defend it. The contingency plan for a Soviet invasion of the Middle East, codenamed Celery, involved defending the Suez Canal by making a stand in the Lebanon-Israel-Jordan area. Robertson was not convinced that it was practical. The rise of Mohammad Mosaddegh prompted Robertson to prepare a plan for intervention in Iran to protect employees of the Anglo-Iranian Oil Company. The plan was not implemented, and the employees left peacefully.

Another trouble spot was Egypt, where the Anglo-Egyptian treaty of 1936 was due to expire in 1956, and British troops would then have to leave Egypt. The British were reluctant to do this—for the protection of the lines of communication between Europe and the Far East, and access to the oil resources of the Middle East, were still regarded as vital to the security of the United Kingdom. The British government sought to retain the base in the Suez Canal area, or, failing that, permission to return in the event of war in the Middle East. However, Egyptians saw the British presence not as protection against a Soviet threat but as continuation of a colonial occupation. For his part, Robertson saw the strategy of the British Chiefs of Staff of halting a Soviet advance into the Middle East on Israel's coastal plain from a base on the Suez Canal as totally impractical, and pressed for one of holding the Turkish and Iranian mountain passes instead. Robertson attempted to resolve his problems with diplomacy, but in October 1951 the Prime Minister of Egypt, Mostafa El-Nahas, announced the abrogation of the 1936 treaty, and the British government began to accept that it would have to leave Egypt.

For his services, he was made a Knight Grand Cross of the Order of the Bath in the 1952 New Year Honours. Robertson was also an aide-de-camp to King George VI and Queen Elizabeth II from 1949 to June 1952. He was Colonel Commandant of the Royal Engineers from 1950 to 1953, and of the Royal Electrical and Mechanical Engineers from 1951 to 1961. He hoped that he would follow in his father's footsteps and become CIGS and achieve the rank of field marshal. The CIGS, Field Marshal Sir William Slim, nominated Robertson and General Sir John Harding. Montgomery argued for the latter, counselling Slim that "you cannot in these days have a CIGS who has never won a battle". Slim was not convinced, but the Prime Minister, Winston Churchill, chose Harding.

== Later life ==
On 5 August 1953 Robertson received a telegram from Churchill asking him if he would be interested in becoming the Chairman of the British Transport Commission. He accepted, and his appointment was announced on 22 September. He held the position until 1961, when he was succeeded by Dr Richard Beeching. In the end, the task of modernising the railway system proved to be beyond even his talents. BR Western Region Class 42 locomotive no. D800 (new in 1958) was named Sir Brian Robertson. In the 1961 Birthday Honours, he was raised to the peerage as Baron Robertson of Oakridge, of Oakridge in the County of Gloucester.

After leaving the British Transport Commission, Robertson became a member of the board of Dunlop. He was also on the board of the Wagon-lits Sleeping Car company, and once a month on a Thursday evening would take the overnight train to Paris for its board meeting. He was also a member of the General Advisory Committee of Independent Television. His maiden speech in the House of Lords in December 1961 was about the Berlin Crisis of 1961. He visited the city again in November as a guest of the American government at the invitation of Clay, who was the special representative of President John F. Kennedy there. He was Chairman of the Gloucester Association of Boys Clubs, and a member of the Council of the National Association of Boys' Clubs. In 1965 and 1968 he was involved in debates in the House of Lords about youth policy. In 1965, he was elected a master of the Salters' Company's Institute of Industrial Chemistry. He also became a Deputy Lieutenant of Gloucestershire on 24 August 1965.

In December 1970, Robertson suffered a series of strokes, which left him debilitated. Another stroke in May 1972 left him able to move about the house only with difficulty. He died on 29 April 1974. A family funeral service was held in Far Oakridge, and a thanksgiving service at Westminster Abbey on 13 June.

== Notes ==
Military offices
Preceded by Sir John Crocker	C-in-C Middle East Land Forces; 1950–1953	Succeeded by Sir Cameron Nicholson
Government offices
New office Following breakdown of Allied Control Council	British High Commissioner at Allied High Commission for Occupied Germany; 1949–1950	Succeeded by Sir Ivone Kirkpatrick
Baronetage of the United Kingdom
Preceded by William Robertson	Baronet (of Beaconsfield); 1933–1974	Succeeded by William Robertson
Peerage of the United Kingdom
New creation	Baron Robertson of Oakridge; 1961–1974	Succeeded by William Robertson
Business positions
Preceded by Sir Cyril Hurcomb	Chairman of the British Transport Commission; 1953–1961	Succeeded by Dr Richard Beeching
