= Baron Robertson of Oakridge =

United Kingdom peerage title

Barony Robertson of Oakridge
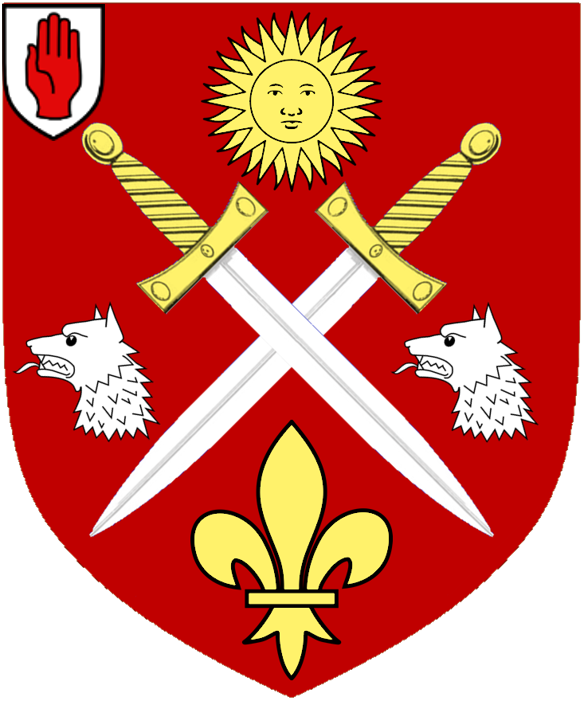
- Blazon Escutcheon: Gules two Swords in saltire Argent hilted and pommelled Gold the points downwards between in chief a Sun in Splendour in base a Fleur-de-lis Or and in fess two Wolves' Heads erased of the second; Crest: Issuant from a Coronet of Fleur-de-lis Or a Demi Wolf Argent gorged with an Eastern Crown Gold supporting with the dexter paw a Lance proper thereon a Pennon per fess Gules and Argent; Supporters: Dexter: a Grey Charger in review order; Sinister: a Springbok, both proper
- Creation date: 29 June 1961
- Created by: Queen Elizabeth II
- Peerage: Peerage of the United Kingdom
- First holder: Brian Robertson
- Present holder: William Robertson
- Heir apparent: The Hon. Daniel Benn Robertson
- Remainder to: Heirs male of the first baron's body, lawfully begotten
- Motto: Fight The Good Fight

Baron Robertson of Oakridge, of Oakridge in the County of Gloucester, is a title in the Peerage of the United Kingdom. It was created on 29 June 1961 for the military commander Sir Brian Robertson, 2nd Baronet. He had previously served as Military Governor of the British Zone in occupied Germany from 1947 to 1949. The Robertson baronetcy, of Welbourn in the County of Lincoln, was created in the Baronetage of the United Kingdom on 4 October 1919 for his father, Field Marshal Sir William Robertson, Chief of the Imperial General Staff from 1915 to 1918. As of 2014 the titles are held by the first Baron's grandson, the third Baron, who succeeded his father in 2009.

== Robertson baronets, of Beaconsfield (1919) ==
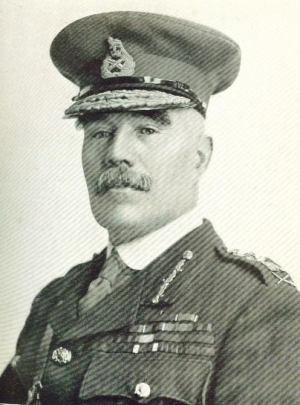
Sir William Robertson, 1st Baronet

- Sir William Robert Robertson, 1st Baronet (1860–1933)
- Sir Brian Hubert Robertson, 2nd Baronet (1896–1974) (created Baron Robertson of Oakridge in 1961)

== Barons Robertson of Oakridge (1961) ==
- Brian Hubert Robertson, 1st Baron Robertson of Oakridge (1896–1974)
- William Ronald Robertson, 2nd Baron Robertson of Oakridge (1930–2009)
- William Brian Elworthy Robertson, 3rd Baron Robertson of Oakridge (b. 1975)

The heir apparent is The Hon. Daniel Benn Robertson.
