= William Wotton =

English theologian, classical scholar and linguist (1666–1727)

William Wotton (13 August 1666 – 13 February 1727) was an English theologian, classical scholar and linguist. He is chiefly remembered for his remarkable abilities in learning languages and for his involvement in the Quarrel of the Ancients and the Moderns. In Wales he is remembered as the collector and first translator of the ancient Welsh laws.

== Life ==
=== Early years ===
William Wotton was the second son of the Rev. Henry Wotton, rector of Wrentham, Suffolk. He was a child prodigy who could read verses from the Bible in English, Latin, Greek and Hebrew before he was six. In April 1676, when he was not yet ten years old, he was sent to Catharine Hall, Cambridge, and graduated in 1679. By this time Wotton had acquired Arabic, Syriac, and Aramaic, as well as a knowledge of logic, philosophy, mathematics, geography, chronology, and history. His parents died whilst he was still at Cambridge, and as a teenager he was taken into the household of Gilbert Burnet, later bishop of Salisbury. He was awarded a fellowship at St John's College, from where he obtained an M.A. in 1683 and a B.D. in 1691. In 1686 he was appointed curate of Brimpton in Berkshire and the following year he was also elected a Fellow of the Royal Society. In January 1689 he was appointed vicar of Lacock in Wiltshire, which he held until his resignation in 1693. Soon after ordination he was also appointed chaplain to Daniel Finch Earl of Nottingham, and tutor to his family. Finch presented him with the rectory of Milton Keynes, Buckinghamshire, in 1693.

=== Educational controversy ===
Wotton began his scholarly career as the translator of Louis Dupin's A new history of ecclesiastical writers, (13 vols. 1692–99). However, he is chiefly remembered for his share in the controversy about the respective merits of ancient and modern learning. In his Reflections upon Ancient and Modern Learning (1694, and again 1697) he took the part of the moderns, although in a fair and judicial spirit. According to Joseph Levine, 'of all the works in the controversy that had yet appeared in English or French his was easily the most judicious.' He was attacked for pedantry by Swift in The Battle of the Books and A Tale of a Tub, but his book proved that 'Wotton was no mere pedant, but a wide-ranging intellect with a thorough command of learning, both ancient and modern.' Wotton responded calling Swift's A Tale "one of the profanest banters upon the religion of Jesus Christ, as such, that ever yet appeared." He also began to write a biography of the chemist Sir Robert Boyle, but his notes were lost and the work was never completed.

Wotton wrote a History of Rome in (1701) at the request of Bishop Burnet, which was later used by the historian Edward Gibbon. In recognition, Burnet appointed him as a prebend of Salisbury from 1705. In 1707 Wotton was awarded a "Lambeth degree" of Doctor of Divinity by Archbishop Thomas Tenison in recognition of his writings in support of the established Church of England against the Deists. Around 1713 Wotton also developed ideas concerning the relationship between languages introducing the concept of an early proto-language by relating Icelandic, the Romance languages and Greek. This pre-dated Sir William Jones' famous lecture comparing Sanskrit with the Classical languages, by more than seventy years. These theories were later published after Wotton's death, as A discourse concerning the confusion of languages at Babel (1730).

=== "A Drunken Whoring Soul" ===
Throughout his adult life, Wotton was known to be "a most excellent preacher, but a drunken whoring soul". He was also very extravagant, transforming his rectory into a 32-roomed mansion. He was, however, able to borrow money against future expectations of ecclesiastical preferment as a result of his close friendship with William Wake, then bishop of Lincoln. Between the summer of 1711 and the Spring of 1712, Wotton appears to have experienced a mid-life crisis, and he scandalised the neighbourhood on many occasions by being found drunk in public, or else was known to have spent prolonged periods in local brothels. As a result, he was initially warned about his behaviour by Wake, who later broke off their friendship and rescinded his promise of providing an additional living in Buckinghamshire. As soon as it became known that the rector's expectations had been dashed, local tradesmen began to press for the payment of their debts. In May 1714, Wotton was forced to abandon his rectory at Milton Keynes to avoid his creditors, and for seven years he lived at Carmarthen in south-west Wales under the assumed name of Dr. William Edwards.

=== Studies in Wales ===
Whilst at Carmarthen, Wotton reformed his character and returned to his studies. He was also able to re-establish his friendship with Wake, who had become Archbishop of Canterbury in December 1715.

Wotton began to study Welsh, and produced an important bilingual parallel text edition of the Welsh and Latin texts of the medieval Welsh laws traditionally attributed to Hywel Dda at the request of his friend. To do this he had first to identify and obtain transcripts of a fifteen or so known manuscripts in either Latin or Mediaeval Welsh, and establish a text, and then begin the difficult task of translating the Mediaeval Welsh terminology which appeared in both the Latin and Welsh versions, but the meaning of which had been lost by the 18th century. From 1721 Wotton was assisted by the Welsh scholar Moses Williams. Wotton lived to complete the translation but was working on an accompanying glossary when he died. This was completed by Williams, and the whole work was published in 1730 by his son-in-law William Clarke in a large folio edition under the title Leges Wallicae.

Whilst at Carmarthen he also conducted surveys of the cathedrals of St David's and Llandaff which were published by his friend Browne Willis in 1717 and 1718. He published Miscellaneous Discourses relating to the Traditions and Usages of the Scribes and Pharisees which included a translation of part of the Mishnah in (1718).

=== Death ===
Wotton had repaid his creditors and was able to return to Bath in October 1721 and London in June 1722 but was in very poor health. He was still working on his Leges Wallicae, when he died of dropsy at Buxted, Sussex, on 13 February 1727.

== Works ==
- Cyfreithjeu Hywel Dda ac eraill, seu Leges Wallicae Ecclesiasticae et Civiles Hoeli boni et Aliorum Walliae Principum (London, 1730)
- The History of Rome from the Death of Antoninus Pius to the Death of Severus Alexander, London: Tim. Goodwin, 1701
- Miscellaneous Discourses relating to the Traditions and Usages of the Scribes and Pharisees (1718)
- (trans.), Louis Ellies Dupin, A new history of ecclesiastical writers, (13 vols. 1692–99)
- Reflections upon Ancient and Modern Learning (1694, 1697)
- A Discourse concerning the Confusion of Languages at Babel (London, 1713, 1730)
- Linguarum vett. septentrionalium thesauri grammatico-critici, & archaeologici, auctore Georgio Hickesio, conspectus brevis: Cui, ab antiquae literaturae septentrionalis cultore adjectae aliquot notae accedunt (London, 1708)
