= John Burgon =

English Anglican divine (1813–1888)

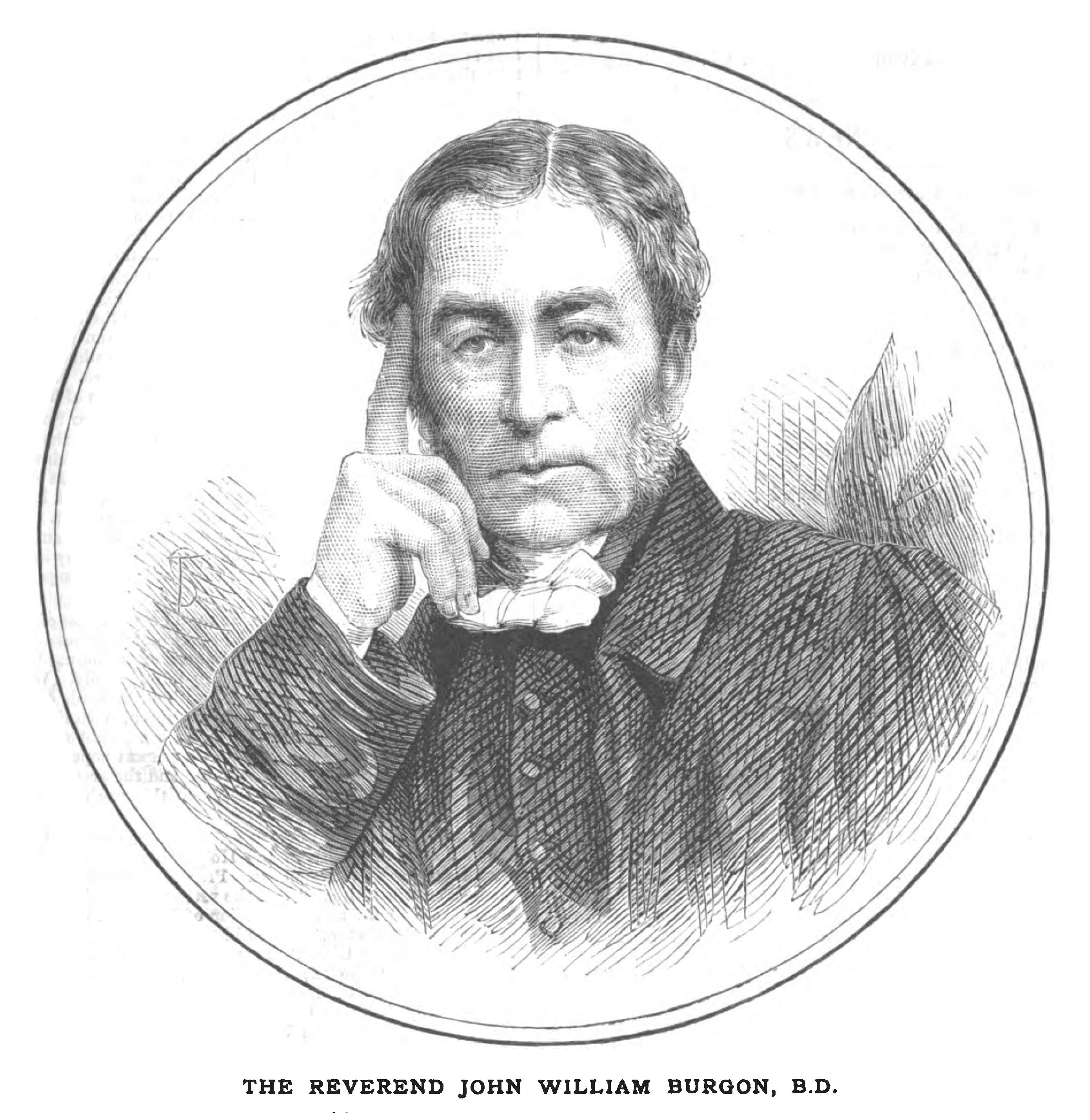
John William Burgon from Church Bells (1875)

John William Burgon (Note: The "g" in Burgon is now generally pronounced like the "g" in "Burgundy", not like the "g" in "burgeoning".) (21 August 1813 – 4 August 1888) was an English Anglican divine who became the Dean of Chichester Cathedral in 1876. He was known during his lifetime for his poetry and his defense of the historicity and Mosaic authorship of Genesis. Long after his death he was remembered chiefly for his defense of the Byzantine text-type and continued ecclesiastical use of the traditional Received Text.

== Biography ==
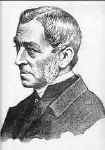
John William Burgon

Burgon was born at Smyrna (now İzmir), on 21 August 1813, the son of Thomas Burgon an English merchant trading in Turkey who was also a skilled numismatist and afterwards became an assistant in the antiquities department of the British Museum. His mother is often said to have been Greek but was in fact the daughter of the Austrian consul at Smyrna and his English wife. During his first year the family moved to London, where he was sent to school. After a few years of business life, working in his father's counting-house, Burgon went to Worcester College, Oxford, in 1841, and took his degree in 1845.

Burgon was elected to an Oriel fellowship in 1846. He was much influenced by his brother-in-law, the scholar and theologian Henry John Rose (1800–1873), a conservative Anglican churchman with whom he used to spend his long vacations. Burgon made Oxford his headquarters, while holding a living at some distance. In 1863 he was made vicar of the University Church of St Mary the Virgin, having attracted attention by his vehement sermons against Essays and Reviews, a series of messages on biblical inspiration in which he defended against the findings of textual criticism and higher criticism the historicity and Mosaic authorship of Genesis, and biblical infallibility in general: "Either, with the best and wisest of all ages, you must believe the whole of Holy Scripture; or, with the narrow-minded infidel, you must disbelieve the whole. There is no middle course open to you."

In 1867 Burgon was appointed Gresham Professor of Divinity. In 1871 he published a defence of the genuineness of the twelve last verses of the Gospel of Mark. He then began an attack on the proposal for a new lectionary for the Church of England, based largely upon his objections to the principles for determining the authority of manuscript readings in the Greek New Testament adopted by Brooke Foss Westcott and Fenton John Anthony Hort. Westcott and Hort led the team producing the Revised Version of the Bible. Burgon assailed Westcott & Hort in a memorable 1881 article in the Quarterly Review, and collected his Quarterly Review articles and pamphlets into books, such as "The Revision Revised", in which he denounced Westcott and Hort for elevating "one particular manuscript, - namely the C (Vatican Codex (B)), which, for some unexplained reason, it is just now the fashion to regard with superstitious deference". He found their primary manuscript to be "the reverse of trustworthy."

Protests against the inclusion of Unitarian Dr Vance Smith among the revisers, against the nomination of Dean Stanley to be select preacher in the University of Oxford, and against the address in favour of toleration in the matter of ritual, followed in succession. In 1876 Burgon was made the Dean of Chichester. (Note: This is an ecclesiastical position, not an academic title. Burgon is widely known today by his ecclesiastical title, "Dean Burgon", which is often wrongly taken either to be his name or to indicate an academic deanship.)

At Oxford, Rev. Charles Henry Waller came under Burgon's influence.

Burgon's two-volume biography was written by Meyrick Goulburn and published in 1892. He has been described as a high churchman of the type prevalent before the rise of the Tractarian school. His collection of transcripts from the Greek Fathers, illustrating the text of the New Testament, was bequeathed to the British Museum. The British Library holds a collation of his Greek gospel manuscripts (MSS) and New Testament index.

Burgon died unmarried at the deanery, Chichester, on 4 August 1888. He was buried in the family grave at Holywell Cemetery in Oxford on 11 August. He is commemorated by a plaque set in the floor of Chichester Cathedral's south transept and by a window in the lady chapel.

== Literary works ==
In 1845, Burgon won the Newdigate Prize, for poems by students at Oxford University, for his poem Petra, about the city of the same name, now in Jordan, which he had never seen. An excerpt describing the buildings has often been reprinted:

It seems no work of Man's creative hand,
by labour wrought as wavering fancy planned;
But from the rock as if by magic grown,
eternal, silent, beautiful, alone!
Not virgin-white like that old Doric shrine,
where erst Athena held her rites divine;
Not saintly-grey, like many a minster fane,
that crowns the hill and consecrates the plain;
But rose-red as if the blush of dawn,
that first beheld them were not yet withdrawn;
The hues of youth upon a brow of woe,
which Man deemed old two thousand years ago,
match me such marvel save in Eastern clime,
a rose-red city half as old as time.

The poem is chiefly remembered for the famous final line above, which quotes the phrase "half as old as time" from Samuel Rogers. This fourteen-line excerpt is often referred to as a "sonnet," but the poem is 370 lines long, in rhymed couplets. Burgon published it, apparently in a small pamphlet, in around 1845. A "Second Edition", "To Which a Few Short Poems Are Now Added," was published in 1846, and the text above follows that version. It contained some revisions: "sanctifies" had been "consecrates"; "call'd" had been "deemed"; "But rosy-red,—as if the blush of dawn" had been "But rose-red as if the blush of dawn", and so on. There was also an 1885 book containing the poem.

Hugh Kenner commented on the precision of Burgon's language:

Though romantic, Burgon was being workmanlike. To his generation the age of Time was quite definite; for since Adam was created in the year 4004 B.C. on 23 October, Time in the year Burgon wrote, 1845, was exactly 5849 years old, going back through half of which we locate the founding of Petra at 1080 B.C.

He did not publish any other poetry. His biographical essays on Henry Longueville Mansel and others were also collected, and published under the title of Twelve Good Men (1888).

== Burgon in modern times ==
The name of Burgon is now known in connection with the Burgon Society, which was founded in 2000 to promote the use and study of academical dress, so named because Burgon is the only person to have a hood shape named after him.

Another society which takes his name is the Dean Burgon Society. (Note: Not the same as The Burgon Society previously mentioned.) Burgon was outspoken about the Revised Version and maintained the position that the Bible is the inspired Word of God, but some of his views have differed from the more recent King James Only Movement.

The phrase 'match me such marvel' taken from Burgon's poem Petra serves as the fictional title of a novel by the character St John Clarke in Anthony Powell's twelve-volume work A Dance to the Music of Time.

== Theological works ==
- The Book of Common Prayer: With Illustrations Chiefly from the Old Masters, with Henry John Rose.
- A Plain Commentary on the Four Holy Gospels (in volumes)
- Inspiration and Interpretation: Seven Sermons Preached before the University of Oxford (1861)
- The Last Twelve Verses of Mark (1871)
- The Servants of Scripture (1878)
- The Revision Revised (1881)
- Letters to Dr. Scrivener : Sacred Greek codices at home and abroad (1882)
- The First Chapter of Genesis: A Reply and a Postscript (1886)

Posthumously edited works

- Causes of Corruption of the Traditional Text of the Holy Gospels (1896)
- The Traditional Text of the Holy Gospels vindicated and established (1896)
- Edward Miller, A Textual Commentary Upon the Holy Gospels, Part I, Matthew i-xiv: Largely From the use of Materials, and Mainly on the Text, Left by the Late John William Burgon (1899)

== Other publications ==
- Burgon, John William (January 1841). "On a New Method of Obtaining Representations of Coins". The Numismatic Chronicle. III. Royal Numismatic Society: 190–192.

== Notes ==
Church of England titles
Preceded by Walter Farquhar Hook	Dean of Chichester; 1876–1888	Succeeded by Francis Pigou
