= Jeremiah Markland =

English classical scholar (1693–1776)

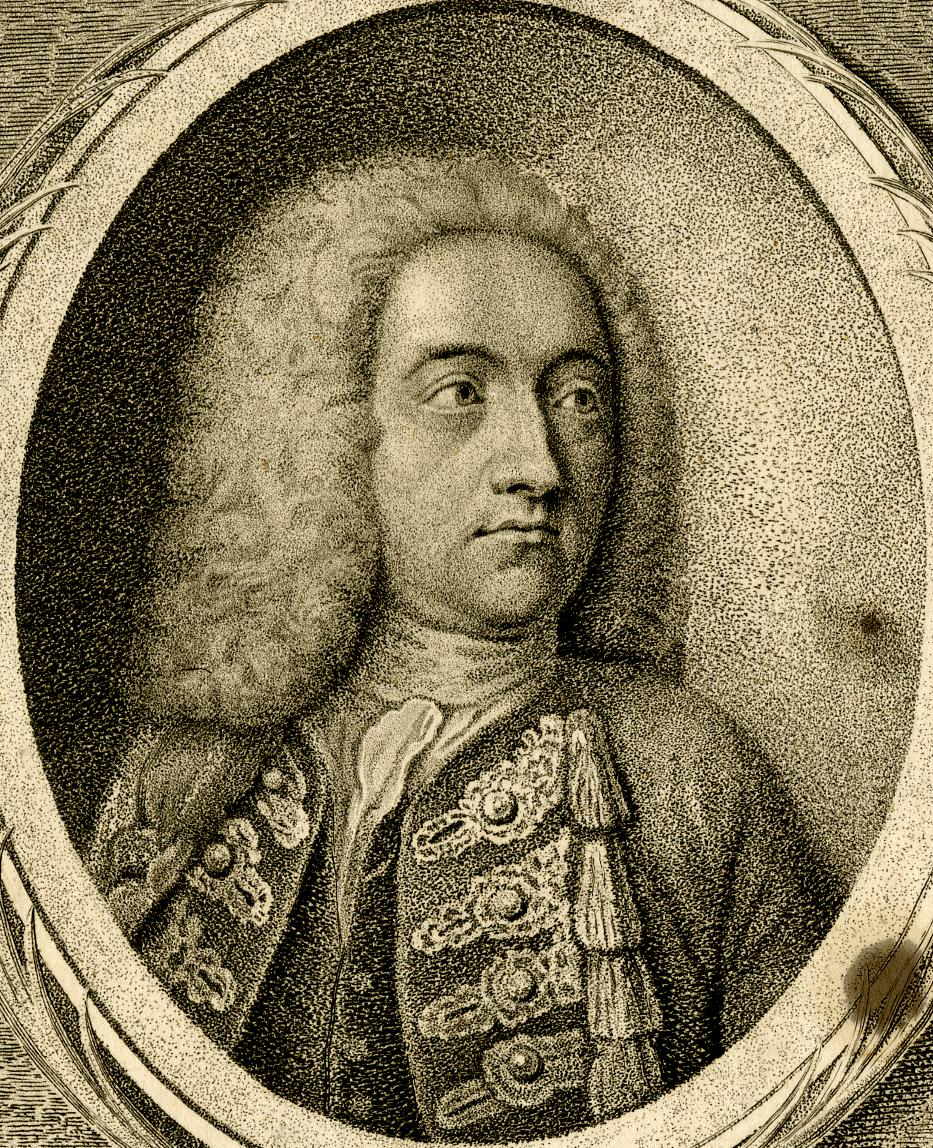
Engraving by James Caldwall

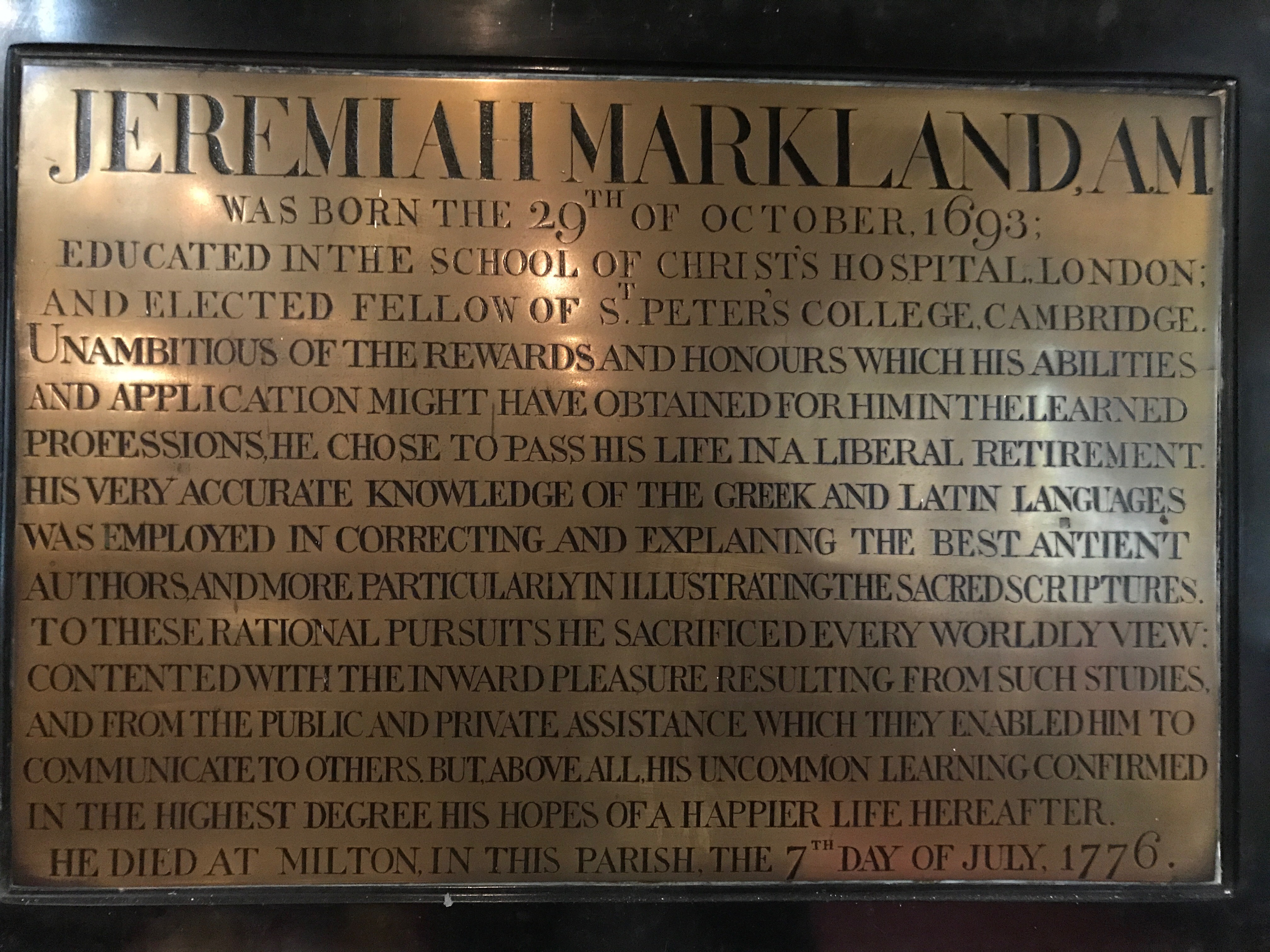
A plaque commemorating the life of Jeremiah Markland in St Martin's Church, Dorking.

Jeremiah Markland (18 October (or 29) 1693 – 7 July 1776) was an English classical scholar.

== Life ==
He was born in Childwall in Lancashire (now Liverpool) on 29 (or 18) October 1693. He was educated at Christ's Hospital and Peterhouse, Cambridge.

He left Cambridge in 1728 to act as private tutor to the son of W. Strode of Ponsbourne, Hertfordshire, returning to the university in 1733. At a later date he lived at Twyford, and in 1744 went to Uckfield, Sussex, in order to superintend the education of the son of his former pupil, Mr. Strode. In 1752 he fixed his abode at Milton Court, near Dorking, Surrey, and remained there, living in great privacy, to the end of his days.

He died at Milton Court, near Dorking.

== Works ==
His most important works are

- Epistola critica: ad ... Franciscum Hare ... in qua Horatii loca aliquot et aliorum veterum emendantur (1723)
- the Sylvae of Statius (1728)
- notes to the editions of Lysias by Taylor, of Maximus of Tyre by Davies, of Euripides's Hippolytus by Musgrave
- editions of Euripides's Supplices, Iphigenia in Tauride and in Aulide (ed. T. Gaisford 1811)
- Remarks on the Epistles of Cicero to Brutus, and of Brutus to Cicero (1745).

== Sources ==
- John Nichols, Literary Anecdotes (1812), iv. 272
- biography by Friedrich August Wolf, Literarische Analekten, ii. 370 (1818)
