= List of British Rail modern traction locomotive classes =

British traction locomotive classification system

This article lists every locomotive allocated a TOPS classification and all modern traction (e.g. diesel, electric, gas turbine, petrol) stock used on the mainline network since 1948 (i.e. British Railways and post-privatisation).

== Diesel locomotives ==
The 1955 diesel locomotive classes are given in brackets where applicable.

A large number of different shunter types were purchased by British Rail and its predecessors, many of which were withdrawn prior to the introduction of TOPS. The tables below attempt to list the different types and the different classifications used to describe them as clearly as possible:

=== Small shunters: under 300 hp ===
Shunter classes are listed by 1955 class, which puts TOPS classes in ascending order, and generally puts 1948 and 1962 classes in ascending order. Unclassed shunters are placed at the start of the table; TOPS class 07 has been placed so its 1962 class is in the logical place.

| CLASS | | | | 1948 Numbers | 1957 Numbers | TOPS Numbers | Year(s) built | Quantity built | Engine | Year(s) withdrawn | Notes | Scrapped |
| TOPS | 1948 | 1955 | 1962 | 1948 Numbers | 1957 Numbers | TOPS Numbers | Year(s) built | Quantity built | Engine | Year(s) withdrawn | Notes | Scrapped |
|---|---|---|---|---|---|---|---|---|---|---|---|---|
| — | — | — | — | — | 11104 | – | 1950 | 1 | 52 hp ("At rail:" 39 hp) | 1967 | Renumbered 52 in the ER/NER Departmental series in 1953. | 1 |
| — | — | — | — | — | 13000 | – | 1934 | 1 | 250 hp | 1949 | ex-LMS diesel shunter 7058; BR number never applied | 1 |
| — | DY1 | D1/1 | 1/15 | 11500–11502 | D2950–D2952 | – | 1954–55 | 3 | 153 bhp | 1966–67 | | All |
| Class 01 | DY2 | D1/2 | 1/12 | 11503–11506, 81 | D2953–D2956, D2956 (ii) | 01 001–2 | 1956–58 | 5 | 153 hp | 1966–81 | | 3 |
| — | DY5 | D1/3 | 1/16 | 11507–11508 | D2957–D2958 | – | 1956 | 2 | 165 bhp | 1967–68 | | Both |
| Class 02 | — | D1/4 | 1/17 | — | D2850–D2869 | 02 001–4 | 1960–61 | 20 | 170 hp | 1969–75 | | 13 |
| — | DY11 | D2/1 | 2/4A | 11700–11707 | D2700–D2707 | – | 1953–56 | 8 | 200 bhp | 1964–68 | | All |
| Class 03 | DJ15 | D2/2 | 2/1 | 11187–11211 | D2000–D2199; D2370–D2399 | 03004–03199, 03370–03399 (with gaps) | 1957–61 | 230 | 204 hp | 1968–93; 2008 | | 174 |
| Class 04 | DJ12/1 | D2/4 | 2/13 | 11100–11115 | D2200–D2214 | N/A | (D2341 1948); 1952–62 | 142 | 204 hp | 1967–72 | D2341 ordered by LNER but transferred to Southern Region. Four exported to Italy following withdrawal. | 124 (1 in preservation) |
| Class 04 | DJ12/2 | D2/13 | 2/13 | 11121–11229 | D2215–D2341 | N/A | (D2341 1948); 1952–62 | 142 | 204 hp | 1967–72 | D2341 ordered by LNER but transferred to Southern Region. Four exported to Italy following withdrawal. | 124 (1 in preservation) |
| — | DJ14 | D2/5 | 2/12A | 11177–11186 | D2400–D2409 | – | 1956–57 | 10 | 204 bhp | 1967–69 | | All |
| — | — | D2/7 | 2/14 | 11116–20, 11144–48 | D2500–D2509 | – | 1955–56 | 10 | 204 bhp | 1967 | | All |
| Class 05 | DJ13 | D2/8 | 2/15A | 11136–43, 11161–76 | D2550–D2573 | 05001 | 1955–61 | 69 | 204 hp | 1966–68, 1983 | | 65 |
| Class 05 | DJ13/2 | D2/9 | 2/15 | — | D2574–D2618 | – | 1955–61 | 69 | 204 hp | 1966–68, 1983 | | 65 |
| Class 06 | — | D2/6 | 2/12 | — | D2410–D2444 | 06001–06010 | 1958–60 | 35 | 204 hp | 1967–84 | 06009 as the works pilot at Dunfermline Townhill Wagon Repair Works in July 1975 | 34 |
| — | DY11 | D2/10 | 2/4 | 11708–11719 | D2708–D2719 | – | 1957 | 12 | 225 bhp | 1967 | | All |
| — | DY11 | D2/10 | 2/4B | — | D2720–D2780 | – | 1958–61 | 61 | 225 bhp | 1967–68 | | 59 |
| — | — | D2/11 | 2/2 | — | D2999 | – | 1958 | 2 | 180 bhp | 1967 | | 1 |
| — | — | D2/12 | 2/14A | — | D2510–D2519 | – | 1961 | 10 | 204 bhp | 1967 | D2519 employed at NCB until 1984. | 9 |
| Class 07 | — | – | 2/16 | — | D2985–D2998 | 07001–07014 | 1962 | 14 | 275 hp | 1973–77 | BR D2991 (07007) | 7 |
| — | — | D3/1 | – | 3/4 | D2900–D2913 | – | 1958–59 | 14 | 330 bhp | 1967 | | All |

- Relation between TOPS, 1948, 1955 and 1962 classes, and 1948, 1957 and TOPS numbers:

=== Large shunters: 300–799 hp ===
| CLASS | | | | 1948 Numbers | 1957 Numbers | TOPS Numbers | Built | Quantity | Engine | Withdrawn | Notes | Scrapped |
| TOPS | 1948 | 1955 | 1962 | 1948 Numbers | 1957 Numbers | TOPS Numbers | Built | Quantity | Engine | Withdrawn | Notes | Scrapped |
|---|---|---|---|---|---|---|---|---|---|---|---|---|
| | | | | 15107 | – | | 1949 | 1 | 360 bhp | 1958 | Ordered by GWR | 1 |
| | | | | 11001 | – | | 1949 | 1 | 500 bhp | 1959 | Locomotive 1100 Ordered by SR | 1 |
| Class 08 | DEJ4 | D3/2 | 3/1 | 13000–13366 | D3000–D4192 except those listed under classes 09 and 10 | 08001–08958 | 1953–62 | 996 | 350 bhp | Still in use | | 899 (3 in preservation) |
| Class 09 | DEJ4 | D3/2 | 3/1 | 13000–13366 | D3665–71, D3719–21, D4099–D4114 | 09001–09026; 09101-09107; 09201-09205 | 1959–62 | 26 | 350 bhp | Still in use | 10 rebuilt from Class 08 | 2 |
| | | D3/3 | 3/1B | 13117–13126 | D3117–D3126 | | 1955 | 10 | 350 bhp | 1966–67 | | All |
| Class 10 | DEJ5 | D3/4 | 3/1C | 13137–13151 | D3137–D3151, D3439–D3453, D3473–D3502, D3612–D3651, D4049–D4094 | N/A | 1955–62 | 146 | 350 bhp | 1967–72 | Class 10 (D3452) in BR blue livery at Bodmin General on 28 August 2003 | 142 (1 in preservation) |
| | DEJ7 | D3/5 | 3/1D | 13152–13166 | D3152–D3166 | | 1955 | 15 | 350 bhp | 1967 | | All |
| | | D3/6 | | 12000–12002 | | | 1935 | 11 | 350 bhp | 1956–62 | ex-LMS diesel shunter | 10 |
| | | D3/7 | 3/8 | 12003–12032 | | | 1939–42 | 30 | 350 bhp | 1966–67 | ex-LMS diesel shunter | All |
| Class 11 | DEJ3 | D3/8 | 3/8A | 12033–12138 | | 01153 | 1945–52 | 136 | 350 bhp | 1967–72 | ex-LMS diesel shunter | 128 (1 in preservation) |
| | DEJ1 | D3/9 | 3/10 | | | | 1944 | 4 | 350 bhp | 1967 | ex-LNER J45 or DES1 Class | All |
| | | D3/10 | 3/11A | | | | 1936 | 1 | 350 bhp | 1965 | Built by GWR | All |
| | | D3/11 | 3/11 | 15101–15106 | | | 1948 | 6 | 350 bhp | 1967 | Ordered by GWR | All |
| | | D3/12 | 3/9A | 15201–15203 | | | 1937 | 3 | 350 bhp | 1964 | ex-SR Diesels 1–3 | All |
| Class 12 | | D3/13 | 3/9 | 15211–15236 | | N/A | 1949–52 | 24 | 350 bhp | 1968–71 | Ordered by SR | 23 |
| | DEJ2 | D3/14 | 3/2 | 15004 | | | 1949 | 1 | 360 bhp | 1962 | Ordered by LNER | All |
| Class 13 | | | 7/1 | | D4500–D4502 | 13001–13003 | 1965 | 3 | 360 bhp | 1983–1985 | Rebuilt from Class 08 | All |

- Relation between TOPS, 1948, 1955 and 1962 classes, and 1948, 1957 and TOPS numbers:

=== Type 1 locomotives: 800 – 1,000 hp ===
| CLASS | | | 1957 numbers | TOPS numbers | Introduced | Quantity | Engine | Withdrawn | Notes | Scrapped |
| TOPS | 1955 | 1962 | 1957 numbers | TOPS numbers | Introduced | Quantity | Engine | Withdrawn | Notes | Scrapped |
|---|---|---|---|---|---|---|---|---|---|---|
| Class 14 (Teddy Bear) | N/A | 6/1 | D9500–D9555 | N/A | 1964–65 | 56 | 700 hp | 1968–69 | 5 exported to Belgium (2) and Spain (3). | 32 |
| | | | 10800 | | 1950 | 1 | 827 hp (rebuilt to 1,400 hp) | 1959 | Built by LMS in 1946, entered service in 1948, sold Brush Traction, rebuilt into research locomotive Hawk. | 1 |
| Class 15 | D8/1 | 8/5 | D8200-D8243 | N/A | 1957–61 | 44 | 800 hp | 1968–71; 1981–1989 (departmental use) | | 43 |
| Class 16 | D8/2 | 8/4 | D8400-D8409 | N/A | 1958 | 10 | 800 hp | 1968 | | All |
| Class 17 (Clayton Type 1) | N/A | 9/18 | D8500-D8587 | N/A | 1962–65 | 117 | 2× 450 hp | 1968–71; 1978 (departmental use) | | 87 |
| Class 17 (Clayton Type 1) | N/A | 9/19 | D8588-D8616 | N/A | 1962–65 | 117 | 2× 450 hp | 1968–71; 1978 (departmental use) | | All |
| Class 18 (I) | N/A | N/A | N/A | | 1985 (Proposed) | | | Never Built | | Never Built |
| Class 18 (II) | N/A | N/A | N/A | | 2021 (Planned) | 15 (Planned) | | Under Construction | | |
| Class 19 | N/A | N/A | N/A | 19001 | 2018 | 1 | DVT | Still in use | Built in 1988 as Mark 3 DVT, rebuild as self-powered vehicle in 2018. | 0 |
| Class 20 | D10/3 | 10/3 | D8000-199, D8300-27 | 20001–20228 | 1957–68 | 228 | 1,000 hp | Still in use | | 189 (1 in preservation) |

- Relation between TOPS, 1948, 1955 and 1962 classes, and 1948, 1957 and TOPS numbers (unless otherwise given):

=== Type 2 locomotives: 1,001 – 1,499 hp ===
Locomotive class are listed by TOPS class. Locomotives for TOPS classes 24 and 26 have their original sub-classes shown, as each wholly comprised locomotives from a distinct 1962 class. Class 21 (II) has sub-classes shown as these are superficially similar but mechanically different types grouped into a single class.

| CLASS | | | | 1957 numbers | TOPS numbers | Introduced | Quantity | Engine | Withdrawn | Notes | Scrapped |
| TOPS | | 1955 | 1962 | 1957 numbers | TOPS numbers | Introduced | Quantity | Engine | Withdrawn | Notes | Scrapped |
|---|---|---|---|---|---|---|---|---|---|---|---|
| Class 21 (I) (NBL) | | D10/1 | 10/4 | D6100-D6157 | N/A | 1958–60 | 58 | 1,000 hp | 1967–68 | 20 rebuilt to Class 29 | All |
| Class 21 (I) (NBL) | | D11/2 | 11/4 | D6100-D6157 | N/A | 1958–60 | 58 | 1,100 hp | 1967–68 | 20 rebuilt to Class 29 | All |
| Class 21 (II) | 21/5 | N/A | N/A | N/A | 21544–21547 | 2004–05 | 4 | 2,110 hp | Still in use | | 0 |
| Class 21 (II) | 21/6 | N/A | N/A | N/A | 21610–21611 | 2006 | 2 | 1,500 hp | Still in use | | 0 |
| Class 21 (II) | 21/9 | N/A | N/A | N/A | 21901–21910 | 1991–92 | 5 | 1,270 hp | Still in use | | 0 |
| Class 21 (II) | 21/9 | N/A | N/A | N/A | 21901–21910 | 2010 | 2 | 1,270 hp | Still in use | | 0 |
| Class 21 (II) | 21/9 | N/A | N/A | N/A | 21901–21910 | 2016 | 3 | 1,270 hp | Still in use | | 0 |
| Class 22 (Baby Warship) | | D10/2A | 10/4A | D6300-D6305 | N/A | 1959–62 | 58 | 1,000 hp | 1967–72 | | All |
| Class 22 (Baby Warship) | | D11/5 | 11/4A | D6306-D6357 | N/A | 1959–62 | 58 | 1,100 hp | 1967–72 | | All |
| Class 23 (Baby Deltic) | | D11/1 | 11/3 | D5900-D5909 | N/A | 1959 | 10 | 1,100 hp | 1968–71; 1975 (departmental use) | | All |
| Class 24 | 24/0 | D11/3 | 11/1 | D5000-D5049 | 24001–24047 | 1958–61 | 50 | 1,160 hp | 1967–80; 1987 (departmental use) | | 49 |
| Class 24 | 24/1 | D11/3 | 11/1A | D5050-5150 | 24051–24101 | 1958–61 | 101 | 1,160 hp | 1967–80; 1987 (departmental use) | | 98 |
| Class 25 | | D12/1 | 12/1 | D5151–D5299, D7500–D7677 | 25001–25327 | 1961-67 | 327 | 1,250 hp | 1984–87 | | 303 |
| Class 26 | 26/0 | D11/4 | 11/6 | D5300-D5319 | 26001–26046 | 1958 | 20 | 1,160 hp | 1975–94 | | 13 |
| Class 26 | 26/1 | N/A | 11/6A | D5320-D5346 | 26001–26046 | 1958 | 27 | 1,160 hp | 1975–94 | | 21 |
| Class 27 | | D12/3 | 12/6 | D5347-D5415 | 27001–27066 | 1961–62 | 69 | 1,250 hp | 1987 | | 61 |
| Class 28 | | D12/1 | 12/5 | D5700-D5719 | N/A | 1958–59 | 20 | 1,200 hp | 1967–68; 1980 (departmental use) | A 'Metrovick' passing through Grange-over-Sands, June 1963 | 19 |
| Class 29 | | N/A | 13/4 | D6100-03/06-08/ 12-14/16/19/21/ 23-24/29-30/ 32-33/37 | N/A | 1958–60; Rebuilt 1965–1967 | 20 | 1,350 hp | 1969–71 | Rebuilt from Class 21 | All |
| Classes 30 & 31 | | D13/1, D14/2 | 14/2 | D5500-D5699, D5800-D5862 | 31001–31970 | 1957-62 | 263 plus 81 conversions | 1,250 bhp or 1,365 bhp | 1975-2017 | | 217 (10 in preservation) |

- Relation between TOPS, 1948, 1955 and 1962 classes, and 1948, 1957 and TOPS numbers (unless otherwise given):

=== Type 3 locomotives: 1,500–1,999 hp ===
| CLASS | | | Pre-TOPS numbers | TOPS numbers | Introduced | Quantity | Engine | Withdrawn | Notes | Scrapped |
| TOPS | 1955 | 1962 | Pre-TOPS numbers | TOPS numbers | Introduced | Quantity | Engine | Withdrawn | Notes | Scrapped |
|---|---|---|---|---|---|---|---|---|---|---|
| Classes 33 & 34 | D15/1 | 15/6 | D6500–D6585 | 33001–33065; 33101–33119 | 1960–62 | 98 | 1,550 hp | Still in use (with West Coast Railway Company) | | 59 |
| Classes 33 & 34 | D15/2 | 15/6A | D6586-D6597 | 33201–33212 | 1960–62 | 98 | 1,550 hp | Still in use (with West Coast Railway Company) | | 8 |
| Class 35 (Hymek) | D17/2 | 17/7 | D7000–D7100 | N/A | 1961–64 | 101 | 1,700 hp | 1971–1975 | | 97 |
| Class 37 | D17/1 | 17/3 | D6600-D6608; D6700-D6999 | 37001–37308 | 1960–65 | 309 | 1,750 hp | Still in use | | 177 |
| Class 38 | | | | | 1980s (Proposed) | | | Never built | | Never built |
| | D16/1 | 16/8 | 10000-10001 | | 1947–48 | 2 | 1,600 hp | 1963; 1966 | 10000 was built under LMS before nationalisation. | All |
| | D16/2 | 16/9 | 10201-10203 | | 1950 (2); 1954 (1) | 3 | 10201/2: 1,750 hp (1,600 hp from 1957); 10203: 2,000 hp | 1963 | 10203 at Bletchley Ordered by SR before nationalisation. | All |

- Relation between TOPS, 1955 and 1962 classes, and pre-TOPS and TOPS numbers (unless otherwise given):

=== Type 4 locomotives: 2,000–2,999 hp ===
| CLASS | | | 1957 numbers | TOPS numbers | Built | Quantity | Engine | Withdrawn | Notes | Scrapped |
| TOPS | 1955 | 1962 | 1957 numbers | TOPS numbers | Built | Quantity | Engine | Withdrawn | Notes | Scrapped |
|---|---|---|---|---|---|---|---|---|---|---|
| | | | 10100 | | 1951 | 1 | 2,000 hp | 1958 | Nicknamed "The Fell Locomotive", ordered by LMS before nationalisation. | 1 |
| Class 40 | D20/1 | 20/3 | D200-D399 | 40001-40199 | 1958–62 | 200 | 2,000 hp | 1967 (1); 1975–85; 1987 (departmental use) | | 193 |
| Class 41 (I) (Warship) | D20/2 | 20/4 | D600-D604 | N/A | 1958–59 | 5 | 2× 1,000 hp | 1967 | Withdrawn before introduction of TOPS system | All |
| Class 41 (II) | N/A | | | 41001-41002; 43000-43001 | 1972 | 2 | 2,250 hp | 1982 | Power cars for Prototype HST | 1 |
| Class 41 (III) | N/A | | | | 1990s (Proposed) | | | Never Built | | Never Built |
| Class 42 (Warship) | D22/1 | 22/1 | D800-D832, D866-D870 | N/A | 1958–61 | 38 | 2× 1,135 hp | 1968–72; 1985 (departmental use) | | 36 |
| Class 43 (I) (Warship) | D22/2 | 22/2 | D833-D865 | N/A | 1960–62 | 33 | 2× 1,100 hp | 1969–1971 | | All |
| Class 43 (II) | N/A | | | 43002-43198 | 1975–82 | 197 | 1,770 hp | Still in use | Power cars for the InterCity 125 HST sets | 6 |
| Class 44 (Peak) | D23/1 | 23/1 | D1-D10 | 44001-41010 | 1959–60 | 10 | 2,300 hp | 1976–80 | | 8 |
| Class 45 (Peak) | D25/1 | 25/1 | D11-D137 | 45001-45077; 45101-45150 | 1960–63 | 127 | 2,500 hp | 1981–89 | | 115 |
| Class 46 (Peak) | N/A | 25/1A | D138-D193 | 46001-46056 | 1961 | 56 | 2,500 hp | 1977–84; 1984–1991 (departmental use) | | 53 |
| Class 47 | N/A | 27/2 | D1100-D1111, D1500-D1999 | 47 001-47 981 | 1962–68 | 512 | 2,750 hp (later derated to 2,580 hp) | Still in use | | 492 |
| Class 48 | N/A | 27/2 | D1702-D1706 | 47114-47118 | 1965–66 | 5 | 2,650 hp | 1990–91 | Re-engined to Class 47, 1969–1971 | 4 |
| Class 50 | N/A | 27/3 | D400-D449 | 50001-50050 | 1967–68 | 50 | 2,700 hp | still in use with GB railfreight | Based on the DP2 prototype | 32 |
| Class 52 (Western) | D27/1 | 27/1 | D1000-D1073 | N/A | 1961–1964 | 74 | 2 x 1,350 hp | 1973–77 | | 67 |
| Class 53; Falcon | N/A | N/A | 1200 | N/A | 1961 | 1 | 2,880 hp | 1975 | Prototype locomotive. Not classified until taken into BR stock as No. 1200 | 1 |
| Class 57 | N/A | | | 57001-57012; 57301-57316; 57601-57605 | 1965–67; Rebuilt: 1997–2004 | 33 | 2,580 hp | Still in use | Rebuilt from Class 47 | 0 |

=== Type 5 locomotives: over 3,000 hp ===
| CLASS | | | 1957 numbers | TOPS numbers | Built | Quantity | Engine | Withdrawn | Notes | Scrapped |
| TOPS | 1955 | 1962 | 1957 numbers | TOPS numbers | Built | Quantity | Engine | Withdrawn | Notes | Scrapped |
|---|---|---|---|---|---|---|---|---|---|---|
| Class 51 (Super Deltic) | N/A | | | | 1960s (Proposed) | | | Never Built | | Never Built |
| Class 55 (Deltic) | D33/1 | 33/1 | D9000-D9021 | 55001–55022 | 1961–62 | 22 | 2× 1,650 hp | 1980–82 | Based on the DP1 Deltic prototype | 16 |
| Class 56 | N/A | | | 56001-56135 | 1976–84 | 135 | 3,250 hp | still in use | 3 in Hungary | 97 |
| Class 58 | N/A | | | 58001-58050 | 1983–87 | 50 | 3,300 hp | 1999–2002 | Some were still in use in France (23) and Spain (13), since scrapped | 9 |
| Class 59 | N/A | | | 59001-59005; 59101-59104; 59201-59206 | 1985–95 | 15 | 3,300 hp | still in use | | 0 |
| Class 60 | N/A | | | 60001-60015; 60017-60100; 60500 | 1989–93 | 100 | 3,100 hp | still in use | | 1 |
| Class 62 | N/A | | | | 1990s (Proposed) | | | Never Built | | Never Built |
| Class 65 | N/A | | | | | | | Never Built | | Never Built |
| Class 66 | N/A | | | 66001-66249; 66301-66305; 66411-66434; 66501-66599; 66601-66625; 66701-66789; 66846-66850; 66951-66957 | 1998–2015 | 446 | 3,200 hp | Still in use | | 2 |
| Class 67 | N/A | | | 67001-67030 | 1999–2000 | 30 | 3,200 hp | Still in use | | 1 |
| Class 68 | N/A | | | 68001-68034 | 2013–2017 | 34 | 3,800 hp | Still in use | | 0 |
| Class 69 | N/A | | | 69001-69016 | 2020–2025 | 16 | 3,200 hp | Still in use | Planned conversion of Class 56. | 0 |
| Class 70 (II) | N/A | | | 70001-70020 | 2009–2011 | 37 | 3,300 hp | Still in use | | 0 |
| Class 70 (II) | N/A | | | 70801-70817 | 2011–2017 | 37 | 3,300 hp | Still in use | | 0 |

== Electric locomotives ==
| TOPS class | Pre-TOPS class | Pre-TOPS numbers | TOPS numbers | Built | Quantity | Power supply | Power | Withdrawn | Notes | Scrapped |
|---|---|---|---|---|---|---|---|---|---|---|
| | EB1/EF1 | 26502-26511 | N/A | 1914–1919 | 10 | 1.5 kV DC | 1,100 hp | 1950–1951; 1964 | Built by NER (later LNER) | All |
| | EE1 | 26600 | N/A | 1922 | 1 | 1.5 kV DC | 1,800 hp | 1950 (never used) | Built by NER | All |
| | ES1 | 26500–26501 | N/A | 1903–1904 | 2 | 600 V DC | 640 bhp | 1964 | Built by NER | 1 |
| Class 70 (I) | Southern Railway; Class CC Electrics | 20001-20003 | N/A | 1941; 1945; 1948 | 3 | 660/750 V DC | 1,470 hp | 1968 | | All |
| Class 71 | HA | E5000–E5023 later E5001–E5024 | 71001–71014 | 1958–60 | 24 | 660/750 V DC | 2,252 hp | 1976–77 | | 13 |
| Classes 72 & 73 | JA or JB | E6001–E6049 | 73001–73006 73101–73142 | 1962; 1965–67 | 49 | 660/750 V DC, diesel | 1,600 hp (electric), 600 hp (diesel) | Still in use | | 10 |
| Class 74 | HB | E6101–E6110 | 74001–74010 | 1958–60; Rebuilt 1967–1968 | 10 | 660/750 V DC, diesel | 2,500 hp (electric), 650 hp (diesel) | 1976–1977 | Rebuilt from Class 71 | All |
| Class 75 | | | | 1960s (Proposed) | | 660/750 V DC, diesel | | Never Built | | Never built |
| Class 76 | EM1 | 26000–26055 later E26000–26057 | 76001–76057 | 1941 (prototype); 1950–53 | 58 | 1.5 kV DC | 1,300 hp | 1970 (prototype); 1981 | Prototype built by LNER | 57 |
| Class 77 | EM2 | 27000–27006 | N/A | 1953–54 | 7 | 1.5 kV DC | 2,490 hp | 1968 | Sold to Netherlands as NS 1500 Class | 4 |
| Class 80 | | E1000; E2001 from 1959 | N/A | 1951 rebuilt 1958 | 1 | 25 kV AC | 2,500 hp | 1968 | Rebuilt from prototype main line gas turbine-electric locomotive 18100, stored in 1961. | 1 |
| Class 81 | AL1 | E3001–E3023, E3096–E3097 | 81001–81022 | 1959–1964 | 25 | 25 kV AC | 3,680 hp | 1968 (2); 1971 (1); 1983–91 | | 24 |
| Class 82 | AL2 | E3046–E3055 | 82001–82008 | 1960–62 | 10 | 25 kV AC | 3,300 hp | 1969 (1); 1971 (1); 1983 (6); 1987 (2) | | 9 |
| Class 83 | AL3 | E3024–E3035, E3098-E3100 | 83001–83015 | 1960–62 | 15 | 25 kV AC | 2,950 hp | 1975 (1); 1978 (1); 1983 (10); 1989 (3) | 83012 (previously E3035) at Doncaster Works | 14 |
| Class 84 | AL4 | E3036–E3045 | 84001–84010 | 1960–61 | 10 | 25 kV AC | 3,560 hp | 1979–80 | | 9 |
| Class 85 | AL5 | E3056–E3095 | 85001–85040 | 1961–64 | 40 | 25 kV AC | 3,200 hp | 1981–92 | | 39 |
| Class 86 | AL6 | E3101–E3200 | 86001–86048, 86201–86252 | 1965–66 | 100 | 25 kV AC | 3,600, 4,040 or 5,000 hp | 2002-2021 | Some still in use in Bulgaria (7) and Hungary (9) | 65 |
| Class 87 | | E3201–E3234 (not carried) | 87001–87035, 87101 | 1973–75 | 36 | 25 kV AC | 4,850 or 5,000 hp | 2003–6 | 87028 at Crewe in 1988 27 still in use in Bulgaria | 12 |
| Class 88 (I) | | | | 1983–87 (planned) | | 25 kV AC | | Never Constructed | | Never built |
| Class 88 (II) | | | 88001–88010 | 2015–16 | 10 | 25 kV AC, diesel | 5,400 hp (electric); 940 hp (diesel) | still in use | 88003 at InnoTrans 2016 | 0 |
| Class 89 | | | 89001 | 1986 | 1 | 25 kV AC | 5,748 hp | 2001 | 89001 Doncaster Works Prototype locomotive | 0 |
| Class 90 | | | 90001–90050 | 1987–90 | 50 | 25 kV AC | 5,000 hp | Still in use | 90001 at Crewe | 6 |
| Class 91 | | | 91001–91031 later 91101–91122, 91124–91132 | 1988–91 | 31 | 25 kV AC | 6,480 hp | 2019-date still in use | 91021 at Peterborough in 1992 | 5 |
| Class 92 | | | 92001–92046 | 1993–96 | 46 | 750 V DC, 25 kV AC | 5,360 hp (750V), 6,760 hp (25 kV) | Still in use | | 0 |
| Class 93 (I) | | | | 1992–95 (planned) | 30 (planned) | 25 kV AC | | Never Constructed | Mock-up of a Class 93 Planned InterCity 250 locomotive; project cancelled in 1992 | Never built |
| Class 93 (II) | | | 93001–93010 | 2022–2024 | 10 | 25 kV AC, battery, diesel | 5,400 hp (25 kV), 540 hp (battery), 1,200 hp (diesel) | Still in use | | 0 |
| Class 99 | | | | 2025 (planned) | 30 (planned) | 25 kV AC, diesel | 8,050 hp (electric) | Under Construction | | 0 |

== Miscellaneous locomotives ==
| Type | Class / number(s) | Information |
|---|---|---|
| Channel Tunnel | Class 22 (II) | SNCF Class BB 22200 class dual voltage electric locomotives used for freight duties through the Channel Tunnel by Railfreight Distribution during 1994–95, prior to the availability of the dedicated Class 92 locomotives. Allocated as Class 22 under TOPS. |
| Channel Tunnel | Class 9000 | Dedicated locomotives used only on Eurotunnel Shuttle services through the Channel Tunnel between Folkestone & Calais. No TOPS classification. |
| Channel Tunnel | Class 0001 | Diesel-electric locomotives used for rescue purposes on the Channel Tunnel network. Classed as 21/9 under TOPS |
| Channel Tunnel | Class 0031 | Diesel locomotives used for maintenance purposes by Eurotunnel on the Channel Tunnel network. No TOPS classification |
| Departmental | Class 97 | General departmental locomotives, used for special or engineering duties. Were therefore of many different classes, lumped together for numbering purposes. Forty-seven locomotives allocated Class 97 numbers, including five in subclass 97/6. |
| Departmental | Class 97/6 | Class 97/6 (97 651, also known as PWM651) at Pitsford and Brampton station Five diesel shunting locomotives purpose-built for departmental duties on the Western Region in 1953 (number 97650) and 1959 (numbers 97651-654), and originally numbered PWM650-4. Withdrawn 1987–2005. |
| Departmental | Various Pre-TOPS Departmental Locomotives | |
| Steam | Class 98 | Class 98 Vale of Rheidol locomotive taking on water Used to cover all steam locomotives used on the mainline in Britain. Had particular usage for the three Vale of Rheidol Railway steam locomotives (and one VoR 0-6-0DH) that remained in BR's ownership after the end of mainline steam traction in August 1968, and numbered 98007–98009, although in practice the locomotives retained their former (GWR) numbers 7–9. Also used for privately owned steam locomotives registered to run on the mainline since 1971, with numbers allocated in the following way: First two digits: 98 (for class 98); Third digit: 0–9 representing the Power Class 0–9; Fourth and fifth digits: The last two digits of the locomotive's original number. If this would duplicate an existing number, then the number is increased by 1 |
| Petrol | 15097-15099 | Petrol powered locomotives built by Simplex, introduced 1919–1925 by the GER and NBR (later LNER (1 built by LNER)), and subsequently inherited by BR. |
| Gas turbine | 18000 | 18000 at the ORE Arsenal Test Centre in 1988 Prototype mainline gas turbine locomotive built for BR in 1949 by Brown Boveri. Had been ordered by GWR in 1940, but construction was delayed due to World War II. |
| Gas turbine | 18100 | Prototype mainline gas turbine locomotive built for BR in 1951 by Metropolitan-Vickers. Had been ordered by the GWR in the 1940s, but construction was delayed due to World War II. |

=== Class 99 ===
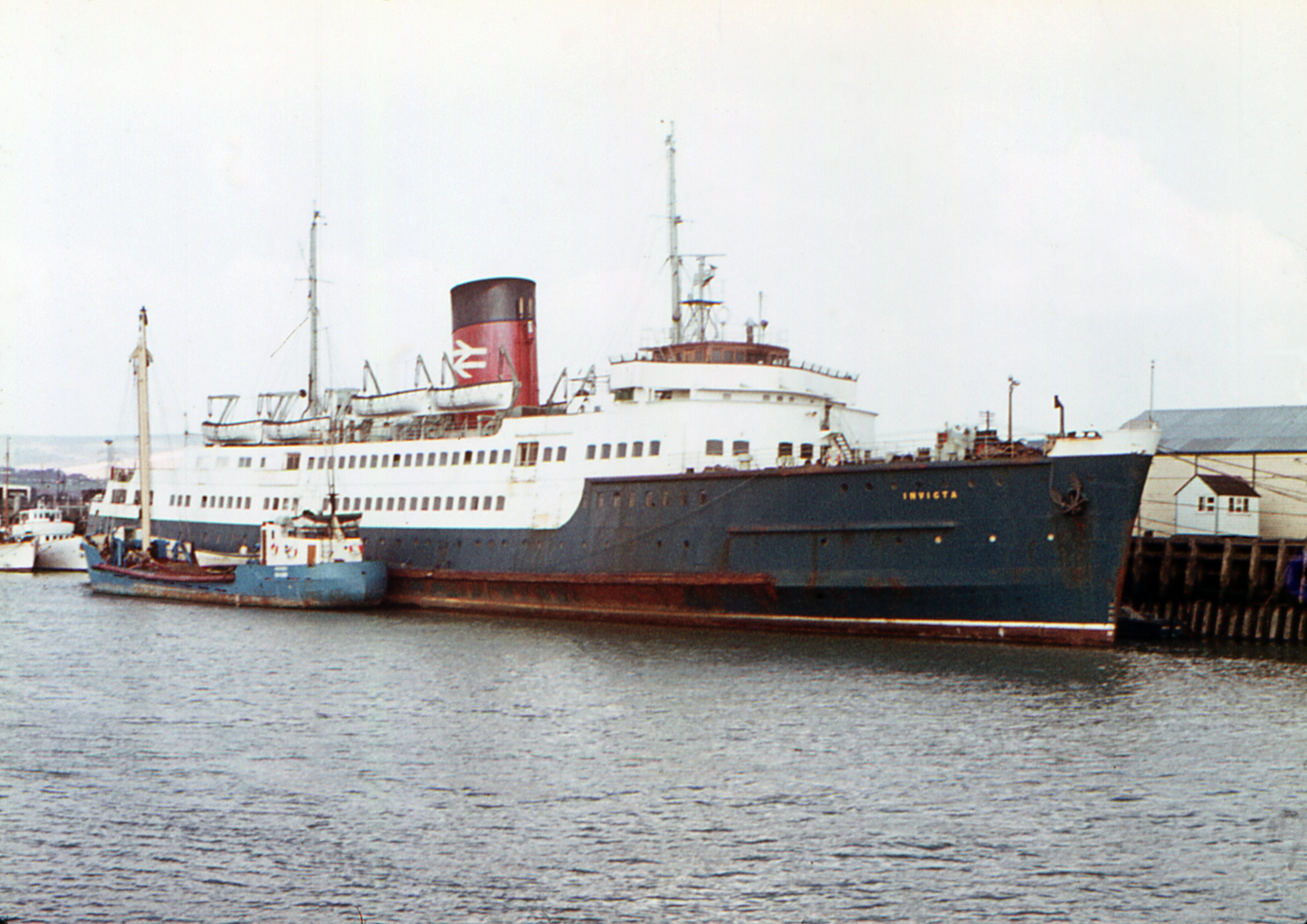
SS Invicta at Newhaven in 1971

When British Rail implemented the TOPS system for managing their operating stock, ships capable of carrying rail vehicles were incorporated into the system as Class 99. In order to circumvent restrictions of the application software, these ships were entered on TOPS as locomotives, 'hauling' the trains which they carried on board. Class 99 has now been allocated to a class of bi-mode locomotives.

=== Builders' demonstrators ===
These were locomotives built and owned by private firms, but used by British Railways to test them.

| Locomotive | Builder | Year | Fate |
|---|---|---|---|
| D0226 & D0227 | English Electric | 1956–60 | Experimental diesel-electric locomotive D0226 post-preservation at Haworth D0226 preserved D0227 scrapped |
| D0260 Lion | BRCWC | 1962-3 | Returned to manufacturer and scrapped in 1964 |
| 10800 Hawk; See 10800, above | Brush Traction | 1962-5 | Stripped 1972-6 and used as a stationary generator, scrapped 1976 |
| D0280 Falcon; See Class 53, above | Brush Traction | 1961-5 | Transferred (and later sold in 1970) to BR; withdrawn 1975, scrapped 1976 |
| D9998; See Class D2/11, above | Brush Traction | 1958 | Scrapped |
| DHP1 | Clayton | 1963-5 | Scrapped 1967 |
| DP1 Deltic | English Electric | 1955–61 | DHP1 "Deltic" at National Rail Museum, Shildon, UK in October 2006 Withdrawn 1961, preserved |
| DP2 | English Electric | 1962-7 | Demonstration locomotive DP2 at Kings Cross in 1963 Destroyed in a collision in 1967, scrapped 1970 |
| GT3 (Gas turbine) | English Electric | 1961-2 | Returned to VF 1962, turbine removed; scrapped 1966 |
| HS4000 Kestrel | Brush Traction | 1967–71 | Kestrel outside Derby Works during testing in 1968 Sold to Soviet Railways 1971; withdrawn 1989, scrapped 1993 |
| Janus | Yorkshire Engine Company | 1956 | Demonstration shunter Janus (2787) at Shelton Sold to Appleby-Frodingham; Steel works; scrapped c.1982 |
| Taurus | Yorkshire Engine Company | 1961 | Stripped 1962, scrapped 1965 |

=== Unbuilt locomotives ===
A number of TOPS class numbers were allocated to proposed locomotives, both diesel and electric, which for many reasons were not proceeded with.

== See also ==
- List of British Rail classes
- British Rail locomotive and multiple unit numbering and classification
- Steam locomotives of British Railways
- List of British Rail diesel multiple unit classes
- List of British Rail electric multiple unit classes
- List of British Rail departmental multiple unit classes
- British Rail coach type codes
