= List of preserved British Rail diesel locomotives =

This is a summary, listing every former class of preserved ex-British Rail diesel locomotives.

For detailed information, see the page for the relevant class.

== Diesel Shunters ==
Small shunters

- British Rail Class D2/10 - 2 preserved
- British Rail Class D2/11 - 1 preserved
- British Rail Class D2/12 - 1 preserved
- British Rail Class 01 - 2 preserved
- British Rail Class 02 - 7 preserved
- British Rail Class 03 - 56 preserved
- British Rail Class 04 - 18 preserved
- British Rail Class 05 - 4 preserved
- British Rail Class 06 - 1 preserved,
- British Rail Class 07 - 7 preserved

Large shunters

- British Rail Class D3/6 - 1 preserved
- British Rail Class 08 - 87 preserved
- British Rail Class 09 - 12 preserved
- British Rail Class 10 - 4 preserved
- British Rail Class 11 - 8 preserved
- British Rail Class 12 - 1 preserved
- British Rail Class 97/6 - 3 preserved

== Type 1 ==
- British Rail Class 14 - 19 preserved
- British Rail Class 15 - 1 preserved
- British Rail Class 17 - 1 preserved
- British Rail Class 20 - 22 preserved

== Type 2 ==
- British Rail Class 23 - no locomotive preserved but one Napier Deltic T9-29 engine preserved
- British Rail Class 24 - 4 preserved
- British Rail Class 25 - 20 preserved
- British Rail Class 26 - 13 preserved
- British Rail Class 27 - 8 preserved
- British Rail Class 28 - 1 preserved
- British Rail Class 31 - 26 preserved

== Type 3 ==
- British Rail Class 33 - 29 preserved
- British Rail Class 35 - 4 preserved
- British Rail Class 37 - 35 preserved

== Type 4 ==
- British Rail Class 40 - 7 preserved
- British Rail Class 42 - 2 preserved
- British Rail Class 44 - 2 preserved
- British Rail Class 45 - 11 (formerly 12) preserved
- British Rail Class 46 - 3 preserved
- British Rail Class 47 - 31 preserved
- British Rail Class 48 - 1 preserved (but with Class 47 engine, as converted c 1971)
- British Rail Class 50 - 18 preserved
- British Rail Class 52 - 7 preserved

== Type 5 ==
- British Rail Class 55 - 6 preserved
- British Rail Class 56 - 1 preserved
- British Rail Class 58 - 5 preserved, so far

== High Speed Train ==
- British Rail Class 41 (HST) - 1 preserved
- British Rail Class 43 (HST) - 7 preserved

== Demonstrators ==
These locomotives worked on British Railways as demonstrators but remained in the ownership of the manufacturers:

NBL/Paxman 0-4-0 diesel-hydraulic

- Tiger - preserved at Bo'ness and Kinneil Railway
- Tom - preserved at Telford Steam Railway

English Electric

- British Railways D0226 - preserved at Keighley and Worth Valley Railway
- British Railways DP1 - preserved at Shildon Locomotion Museum

== Formerly preserved, scrapped ==
=== Type 4 ===
- British Rail Class 45 #45015 - Scrapped in November of 2021.

== See also ==
- List of British Rail power classifications
