= List of preserved British Rail Class 08 locomotives =

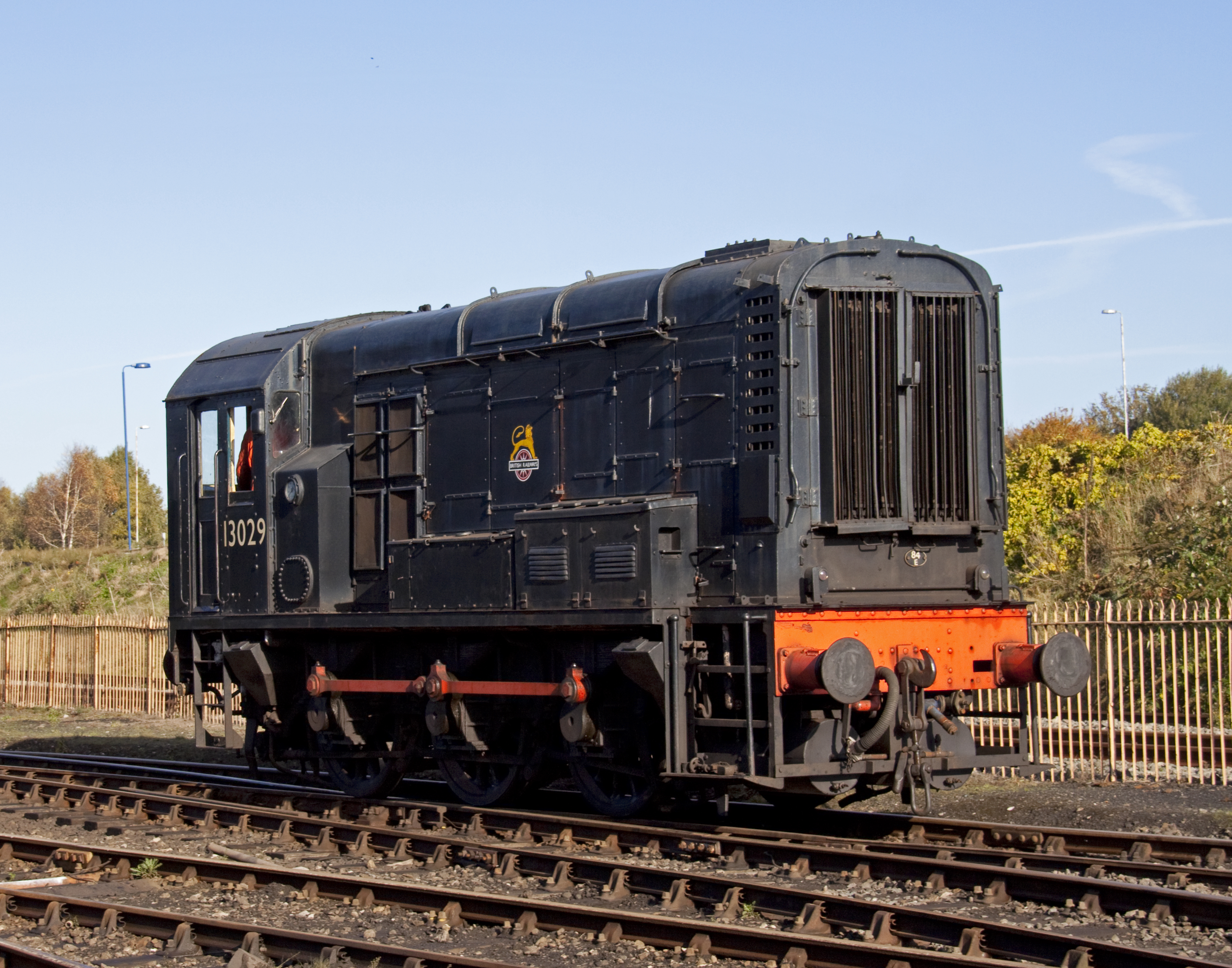
13029 at Tyseley Locomotive Works in 2010

The British Rail Class 08 was the standard class of diesel locomotive designed for shunting. From 1953 to 1962, 996 locomotives were produced, making it the most numerous of all British locomotive classes. There were also 26 of the near-identical but higher-geared Class 09, and 171 similar locomotives fitted with different engines and transmissions (some of which became Class 10), which together brought the total number of outwardly-similar machines to 1193.

Since their introduction, the nature of rail freight in Britain has changed considerably, reducing or removing the need for shunting, therefore only a few Class 08 locomotives remain in service today. However, many have found an active retirement on heritage railways in Britain, with around 87 examples being classed as preserved. Another was preserved at Crewe, but scrapped in 2009. There may be more yet unregistered Class 08 shunters still working in Britain or abroad. Their low maintenance requirements means that most of them are still in operational condition, with only a small number of examples currently awaiting restoration, as of 2023.

== Preserved examples ==
Numbers carried (Current in bold)				Name	Location	Current Status	Livery	Image
13000	D3000	-	**13046**	-	Peak Rail	Awaiting overhaul; first one built	BR Black	
**13002**	D3002	-	-	-	Plym Valley Railway	Operational	BR Black	
13014	**D3014**	-	-	Samson	Dartmouth Steam Railway	Operational	BR Green, Dart Rail insignia	
13018	**D3018**	08011	-	Haversham	Chinnor and Princes Risborough Railway	Operational	BR Green	
13019	**D3019**	-	-	-	Cambrian Heritage Railways	Operational	Blue and White	
13022	**D3022**	08015	-	-	Severn Valley Railway	Operational	BR Green	
13023	D3023	**08016**	-	Geoff L Wright (not carried)	Peak Rail	Operational Last of first Batch	BR Blue	
**13029**	D3029	08021	-	-	Tyseley Locomotive Works	Operational	BR Black	
13030	D3030	08022	-	Lion	Cholsey and Wallingford Railway	Operational	Guinness Black	
13044	D3044	**08032**	33	Mendip	Mid Hants Railway	Undergoing repairs	Yeoman Blue	
13059	**D3059**	08046	-	Brechin City	Caledonian Railway (Brechin)	Operational	BR Green	
13067	D3067	**08054**	-	-	Embsay and Bolton Abbey Railway	stored awaiting re-wiring	BR Blue	
13074	D3074	08060	-	Unicorn	Cholsey and Wallingford Railway	Operational	Guinness Black	
**13079**	D3079	08064	-	-	Locomotion Museum	Operational	Black	
13101	D3101	-	**3101**	-	Great Central Railway	Operational	BR Green	
13167	**D3167**	08102	-	-	Lincolnshire Wolds Railway	Operational	BR Green	
11374	D3174	08108	**3174**	Dover Castle	Kent and East Sussex Railway	Under overhaul	Black	
13180	D3180	**08114**	-	-	Great Central Railway (Nottingham)	Operational	BR Blue	
13190	**D3190**	08123	-	George Mason	Cholsey and Wallingford Railway	Operational	BR Green	
13201	**D3201**	08133	-	-	Severn Valley Railway	Under Overhaul	BR Green	
13232	D3232	**08164**	-	Prudence	East Lancashire Railway	Operational	BR Blue	
**13236**	D3236	08168	-	-	Battlefield Line Railway	Operational	BR Black	
13255	D3255	-	-	-	Private site, Leavening, North Yorkshire	To be restored	N/A	
**13261**	D3261	-	-	-	Swindon and Cricklade Railway	Operational	BR Green	
**13265**	D3265	08195	WD40	Mark	Llangollen Railway	Operational	BR Black	
13272	D3272	**08202**	-	-	Avon Valley Railway	Operational	BR Blue	
13290	D3290	**08220**	-	-	Great Central Railway (Nottingham)	Operational	BR Blue	
13308	D3308	**08238**	-	Charlie	Dean Forest Railway	Light duties only	BR Blue with Wasp Stripes	
13336	D3336	**08266**	-	-	Keighley and Worth Valley Railway	Under Overhaul	BR Engineers Grey	
13358	D3358	**08288**	-	Phoenix	Mid Hants Railway	Operational	BR Blue	
-	D3308	**08308**	-	-	Barrow Hill Roundhouse	Operational, converted to battery power	Green & silver	
-	D3401	**08331**	-	-	Midland Railway - Butterley	Operational	Black	
-	D3420	08350	-	-	Crewe Heritage Centre	Scrapped at Ron Hull, Rotherham 19/9/08	BR Green	
-	D3429	**08359**	-	-	Bodmin & Wenford Railway	Operational	BR Blue	
-	**D3462**	08377	-	-	Mid Hants Railway	Operational	BR Green	
-	D3503	**08388**	-	-	Private Site	Scrapped in October 2010	Trainload Petroleum	
-	**D3411**	08411	-	-	Colne Valley Railway	under restoration	BR Dutch grey	
-	D3551	**08436**	-	-	Swanage Railway	Operational	Black	
-	**D3558**	08443	-	-	Bo'ness and Kinneil Railway	Operational	BR Green (No Logo)	
-	D3559	**08444**	-	-	Bodmin and Wenford Railway	Operational	BR Green	
-	D3560	**08445**	-	-	Daventry International Rail Freight Terminal	Awaiting repair	Yellow	
-	**D3586**	08471	-	-	Severn Valley Railway	Operational	BR Green	
-	D3588	**08473**	-	-	Dean Forest Railway	Source of spares empty shell as of 2/7/16	BR Blue	
-	**D3591**	08476	-	-	Swanage Railway	Operational	BR Green	
**13594**	D3594	08479	-	-	East Lancashire Railway	Operational	BR Black	
-	D3596	**08481**	-	-	Vale of Glamorgan Railway	Scrapped 6 May 2011 at EMR	BR Blue	
-	**D3605**	08490	-	-	Strathspey Railway	Operational	BR Green	
-	D3610	**08495**	-	-	North Yorkshire Moors Railway	Operational	BR Blue	
-	D3617	08502	-	Lybert Dickinson (not carried)	East Kent Railway	Operational - stored	All-over Blue	
-	D3690	**08528**	-	-	Derwent Valley Light Railway	Operational	BR Green	
-	D3723	**08556**	-	-	North Yorkshire Moors Railway	Operational	BR Green	
-	D3743	**08576**	-	-	??	Awaiting restoration	BR Blue	
-	D3757	**08590**	-	Red Lion	Midland Railway - Butterley	Operational	BR Blue (Note: a possible reference to 16440 and 16410)	
-	D3759	08592	**08993**	-	Keighley and Worth Valley Railway	Operational	EWS Maroon and Gold	
-	D3761	**08594**	-	-	Private Site	Awaiting overhaul	BR Blue	
-	D3771	08604	**604**	Phantom	Didcot Railway Centre	Operational	BR Blue	
	D3772	**08605**			Ecclesbourne Valley Railway	Operational	DB Red	
-	D3795	**08628**	-	-	EMR Kingsbury	Scrapped as of 19/5/16 at EMR Kingsbury	BR Blue	
-	D3796	**08629**	-	-	Chinnor and Princes Risborough Railway	Operational	Knorr-Bremse - Green, White and Dark Blue Stripes	
-	-	**08631**	-	Betsy	Bombardier Transportation	Operational	BR Blue	
-	**D3800**	08633	-	-	Churnet Valley Railway	Operational	BR Green	
-	D3802	08635	**H3802**	-	Severn Valley Railway	Undergoing conversion to hydrogen power	BR Green	
-	D3830	**08663**	-	St Silas (nameplates removed)	Avon Valley Railway	Not operational at present	BR Blue	
-	-	**08682**	-	Lionheart	Bombardier Transportation	Operational	Designed by the winner of a children's painting competition	
-	D3861	**08694**	-	-	Great Central Railway	Operational	EWS	
-	D3867	**08700**	-	-	East Lancashire Railway	Operational	BR Blue	
-	**D3871**	08704	-	-	Private Site	Operational	BR Green	
-	D3902	**08734**	-	-	Dean Forest Railway	Undergoing restoration with parts from 08473.	Blue	
-	**D3918**	08750	-	-	Scrapped	Scrapped by Wanted Scrap Metals Ltd, Shildon as of 18/12/18	Black	
	D3926	08757	-	-	Telford Steam Railway	Operational	RES	
-	**D3935**	08767	-	-	North Norfolk Railway	Undergoing overhaul	BR Green	
-	**D3937**	08769	-	Gladys	Dean Forest Railway	Operational	BR Green	
-	**D3940**	08772	-	Tiny/Camulodunum	North Norfolk Railway	Operational	BR Green	
-	D3941	**08773**	-	-	Embsay and Bolton Abbey Steam Railway	Operational	BR Blue	
-	D3948	**08780**	-	Fred	Jeremy Hosking	Operational	Dark Blue	
-	D3952	08784	-	-	Longport (Progress Rail)	Operational	Railfreight Grey	
-	D3991	**08823**	-	-	LH Barton	Operational	Hunslet Orange and Blue	
-	D3993	**08825**	-	-	Chinnor and Princes Risborough Railway	Operational	BR Blue	
-	D4018	**08850**	4018	-	North Yorkshire Moors Railway	Operational	BR Blue	
-	D4033	08865	-	-	East Kent Railway	Operational	EWS	
-	**D4118**	08888	-	-	Gwili Railway	Operational	BR Green	
-	**D4137**	08907	-	-	Great Central Railway	Operational	BR Green	
-	D4141	**08911**	-	Matey	National Railway Museum Shildon	Operational	BR Blue (with small NRM logo)	
-	D4145	**08915**	-	-	North Tyneside Steam Railway	Operational	BR Blue	
-	D4157	**08922**	-	-	Spa Valley Railway	Operational	RailFreight Grey	
-	D4167	08937	-	Bluebell Mel	Dartmoor Railway	Operational	BR Green	
-	D4174	**08944**	-	-	East Lancashire Railway	Awaiting repair	Black	
-	D3854	**08995**	08687	Kidwelly	Gwendraeth railway society	Under Repair	EWS Maroon and Gold	

== See also ==
- List of preserved British Rail diesel locomotives
