= Raykent LDH125 =

Road switcher

LDH 125
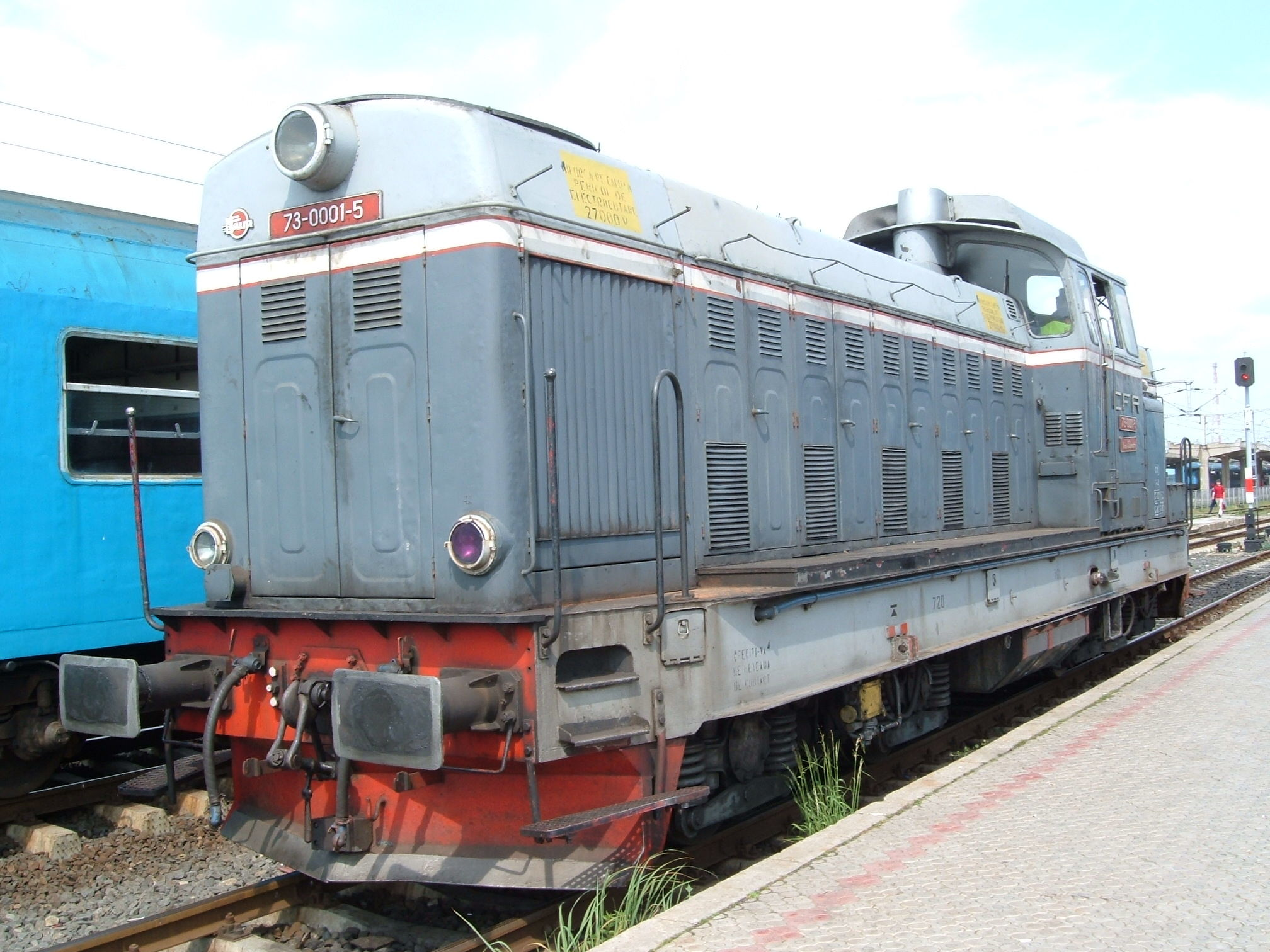
- CFR 73, which is ancestor of LDH 125
Type and origin
- Power type: Diesel-hydraulic with two speed final drive
- Designer: Sulzer
- Builder: refurbished by Raykent
- Build date: 2008
- Total produced: 5
Specifications
- Configuration
  - UIC: B'B'
- Gauge: 1,435 mm (4 ft 8 1/2 in)
- Bogies: 2
- Wheel diameter: 1,000 mm (3 ft 3 in)
- Length: 13,700 mm (44 ft 11.4 in)
- Width: 3,070 mm (10 ft 0.9 in)
- Height: 4,650 mm (15 ft 3.1 in)
- Loco weight: 47 tonnes (46 long tons; 52 short tons)
- Fuel capacity: 3,000 litres (660 imp gal; 790 US gal)
- Prime mover: 4-stroke diesel
- RPM range
  - RPM idle: 300 (Sulzer-engined); 1000 (Cummins-engined)
  - Maximum RPM: 750 (Sulzer-engined); 2100 (Cummins-engined)
- Engine type: Sulzer 6LDA28B; Cummins KTTA38 (LDH 125-408)
- Aspiration: Supercharged, intercooled
- Displacement: 27,500 cubic centimetres (1,680 cu in) per cylinder
- Cylinders: Inline 6
- Transmission: Voith L6
- Loco brake: Air
- Train brakes: Air
- Safety systems: Dead man's switch, Hijack protection
Performance figures
- Maximum speed: 110 km/h (68 mph) (limited to 60km/h in low gear)
- Power output: 1,250 metric horsepower (920 kW)
Career
- Operators: Raykent Lojistik
- Numbers: various
- Locale: Turkey

LDH 125 is a road switcher used by Raykent Lojistik in Turkey. It is used in medium speed movements and heavy-duty switching. It closely resembles the CFR class 73.
