= DA4 =

DA4 may refer to:

- DA postcode area (Dartford postcode area), a group of postal codes in England
- 3/15 DA-4, a BMW car model
- DA4, a model of Honda Integra
- DA4, a Eurofighter Typhoon variant
- DA4, an engine used in the locomotive British Rail 11104
- DA4, a module code for the Dungeons & Dungeons adventure The Duchy of Ten
- Dragon Age: The Veilguard, a 2024 video game
