= Road switcher locomotive =

Type of railroad locomotive

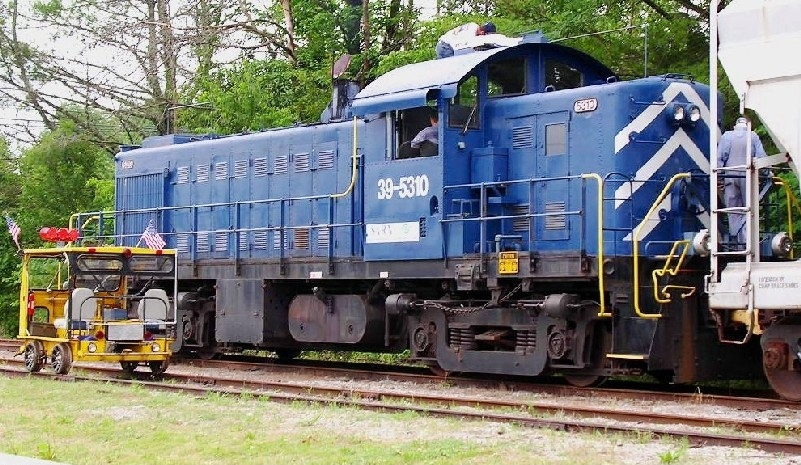
An ALCO RS-1, generally regarded as the first successful road switcher model

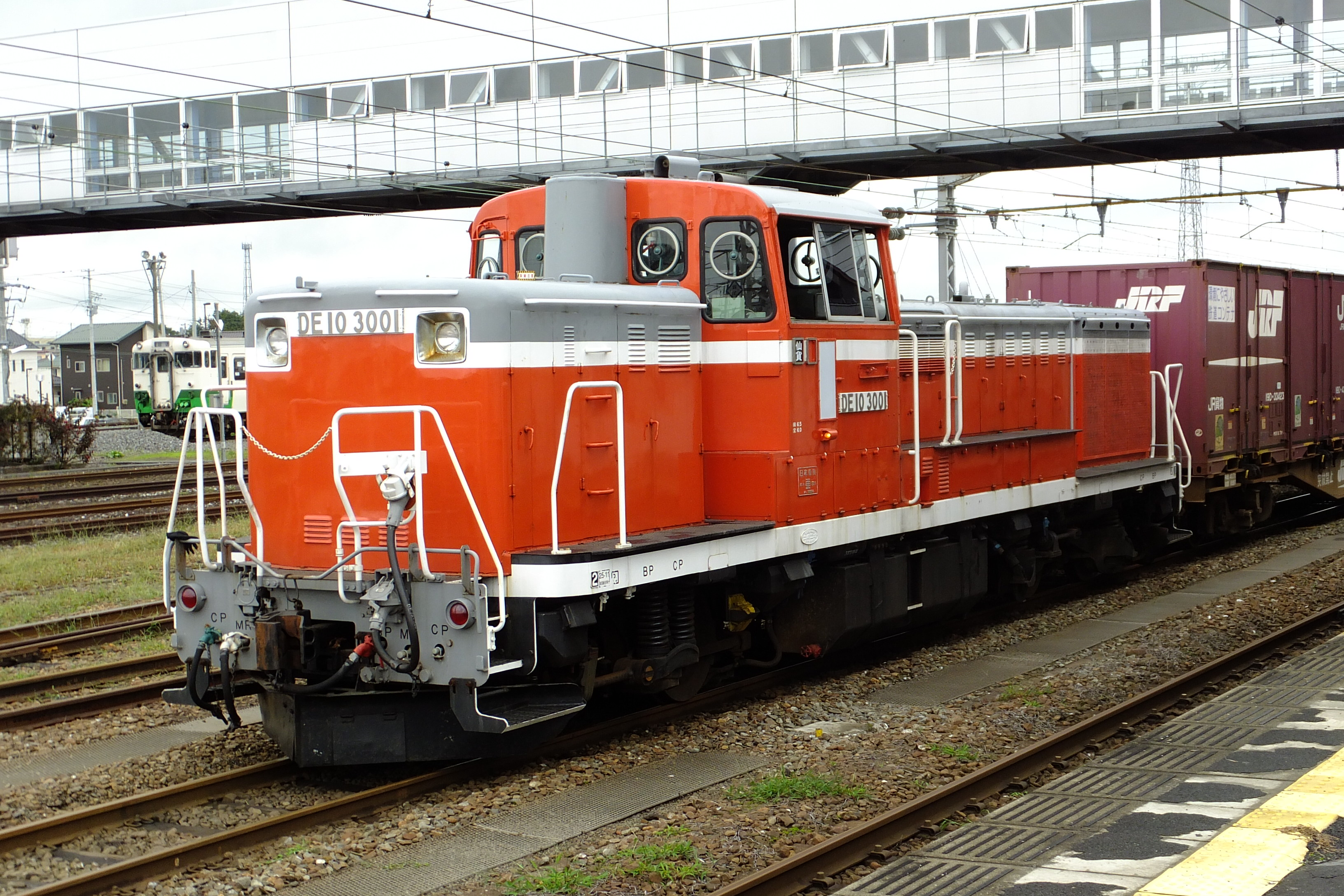
A JNR Class DE10, Japan's most popular road switcher model

A road switcher locomotive is a type of railroad locomotive designed to both haul railcars in mainline service and shunt them in railroad yards. Both type and term are North American in origin, although similar types have been used elsewhere.

A road switcher must be able to operate and have good visibility in both directions. As a road engine, a road switcher must be able to operate at road speeds, with suitable power and cooling capacity. It has high-speed road trucks rather than low-speed switcher trucks.

Modern road trucks are always equipped with "frictionless" roller bearings, whereas switcher trucks were almost always equipped with "friction" plain bearings, until plain bearings were outlawed in interchange service on both railcars and locomotives.

== Overview ==
For the reasons given above, road switchers are generally hood units. The set-back cab of a hood unit provides more safety in the event of a collision at speed than most switcher locomotive designs, and the rear visibility is much better than that of a cab unit. Due to their ability to both run at road speeds for long distances and to switch cars, road switchers, as their name implies, are often used for road (heavy-haul) duties, in addition to their yard (switching) duties. Since the 1960s, road switchers have completely displaced cab units in heavy-haul freight service (but cab-type units, adapted from certain road switcher prototypes, have been employed for contemporary passenger service, in selected cases). Some road switchers were provided with twin control stands, so that the units could operate conventionally (locomotive engineer and conductor/switchman facing the direction of travel) in either "long hood forward" or "short hood forward" directions. However, twin control engineer positions have fallen into disuse as almost all operations are now run "short hood forward".

== Examples ==
Alco's RS-1 was the first successful example of the type, and virtually all modern hood units are laid out in a similar fashion (long hood for all propulsion equipment, short hood for crew accommodations including a toilet). The RS-1, being the first example of a road switcher, and having been initially developed when plain bearings were still common (although not on cab-type road units), often were equipped with plain bearings. Subsequently, roller bearing conversions were implemented, and new units were generally ordered with roller bearings. The RS-1 had a very long manufacturing history, so most 1940s units might be initially ordered with plain bearings (and subsequently converted to roller bearings), but most 1960s units might be ordered with roller bearings.

Fairbanks Morse entered the road switcher field in 1947 with the H-15-44.

EMD was the last to enter the field and failed to capture much of the market with their first road switcher the BL2. (Note: BL, meaning "branch line')

The RS-3 was the best known of the Alco RS road switchers and was produced in more numbers than the RS-1 and RS-2 designs combined.

Although Alco produced the first known road switcher, EMD's GP7 and subsequent GP9 were probably the most successful models from this early period road switchers. Few or no EMD GPs and no EMD SDs were ordered with plain bearings, and any plain bearing-equipped GPs were later updated to incorporate roller bearings.

Modern examples include the EMD SD70 series and the GE AC6000CW, one of the most powerful examples producing 4,500 kW (6,000 hp).

== Horsepower ==
Road switchers may be divided into: Generation 1, 1,500 kW (1,999 hp) or lower, net for traction; Generation 2, 1,500 to 2,200 kW (2,000 to 2,999 hp), net for traction; Generation 3, 2,200 to 3,000 kW (3,000 to 3,999 hp), net for traction; (Note: Identification of this generation, as well as others, is occasionally blurred by the introduction of supplementary models; For example, EMD's Generation 3 40 Series models initially included the 2,200 kW (3,000 hp) GP40 and SD40 and the 2,700 kW (3,600 hp) SD45, however this series was later supplemented by the 1,500 kW (2,000 hp) GP38 and SD38 and the 1,700 kW (2,300 hp) GP39 and SD39, all of which were constructed using the same major components (frame, carbody, cab, etcetera), and the 38 Series eventually became one of EMD's best sellers; Indeed, many of these early units were later upgraded to incorporate Dash 2 subsystems, for improved functionality and reliability; the later 50 Series (2,600 kW (3,500 hp)) logically belongs to this generation while the still later 60 Series (2,800 kW (3,800 hp)) logically belongs to Generation 4.) and Generation 4, 3,000 kW (4,000 hp) or higher, net for traction. Although at one point 4,500 kW (6,000 hp), net for traction, units were made, these quickly fell into disuse, and most have been scrapped by North American railroads. The most common new units made today are 3,200 to 3,400 kW (4,300 to 4,500 hp), net for traction. (Note: Generation 1 and 2 units incorporated conventional (discrete) locomotive controls; Generation 3 units generally incorporated modular (plug-in) locomotive controls; Generation 4 units generally incorporated microprocessor-based locomotive controls.)

== Transmission ==
Within the Americas, road switchers are almost always diesel-electric, with the "transmission" system (i.e., the final drive) being either direct current (standard performance units) or alternating current (high performance units). For economic and performance reasons, 1,900 kW (2,500 hp) and lower units generally have a DC generator, producing 600 volts DC, nominal, whereas 2,200 kW (3,000 hp) and higher units generally have an AC alternator with integral rectifier, producing 1,200 volts DC, nominal, (alternator/rectifiers remained an option on certain sub-2,200 kW (3,000 hp) units, for economic and service reasons). Units with AC final drive accept the 1,200 volts DC from the alternator/rectifier and invert this to 1,200 volts three-phase variable-frequency AC.

== Around the world ==
=== Belgium ===
Belgian state railways NMBS/SNCB operate 170 German built engines in their class 77, both for shunting and for mainline haulage.

=== China ===
The China Railway DF5 is a diesel-electric locomotive used by China Railway in the People's Republic of China. It has been in production since 1976 and is still produced as of 2006 by several local companies. It is the most common road switcher locomotive in China and is used for yard and road switching services. A small number are also in service with the Korean State Railway in North Korea.

=== Czech ===
The ChME3 is a six axle diesel locomotive with electric transmission built by ČKD. The class were used primarily for yard and road switching services. Units have been operated by Russia, Belarus, Ukraine (as class ЧМЭ3, transliteration ChME3) and other ex-Soviet bloc countries, in Czechoslovakia (as class T669, later as ŽSR 770 and ČD 770 in Slovakia and the Czech Republic), on industrial railways in Poland (S200), in Albania (HSH T669.1), Iraq (DES 3101), Syria (LDE 1500) and in India (DEC 120).

=== Finland ===
The mediumweight diesel locomotive VR Class Dv12 was designed as a road switcher. It is widely used as a shunter on switch yards, but it is also used as a line locomotive, both for passenger and freight trains, on unelectrified tracks. The first Dv 12 engines entered service in 1963, and they are planned to serve up until 2040s.

=== France ===
The most common locomotive used by the SNCF for shunting is the BB60000 built by Vossloh.

=== Germany ===
The DB Class V 90 and the Voith Gravita are heavy shunters suited for road switching tasks.

=== Japan ===
The JNR Class DD13 and JNR Class DE10 are the most common road switcher diesel-hydraulic locomotives in Japan, ordered by Japanese National Railways, used for yard and road switching services. Some private terminal railways also ordered new road switchers or purchased a small number of secondhand road switchers.

=== Poland ===
PKP class SM42 is a Polish 74-ton diesel locomotive used for shunting and light mainline haulage (version SP42 and SU42). 1822 units were built, used mostly by Polish carriers but some were exported abroad.

=== Turkey ===
Road switcher diesel-electric locomotives are very common in Turkey. TCDD DE24000 is an example of such a road switcher.

=== United Kingdom ===
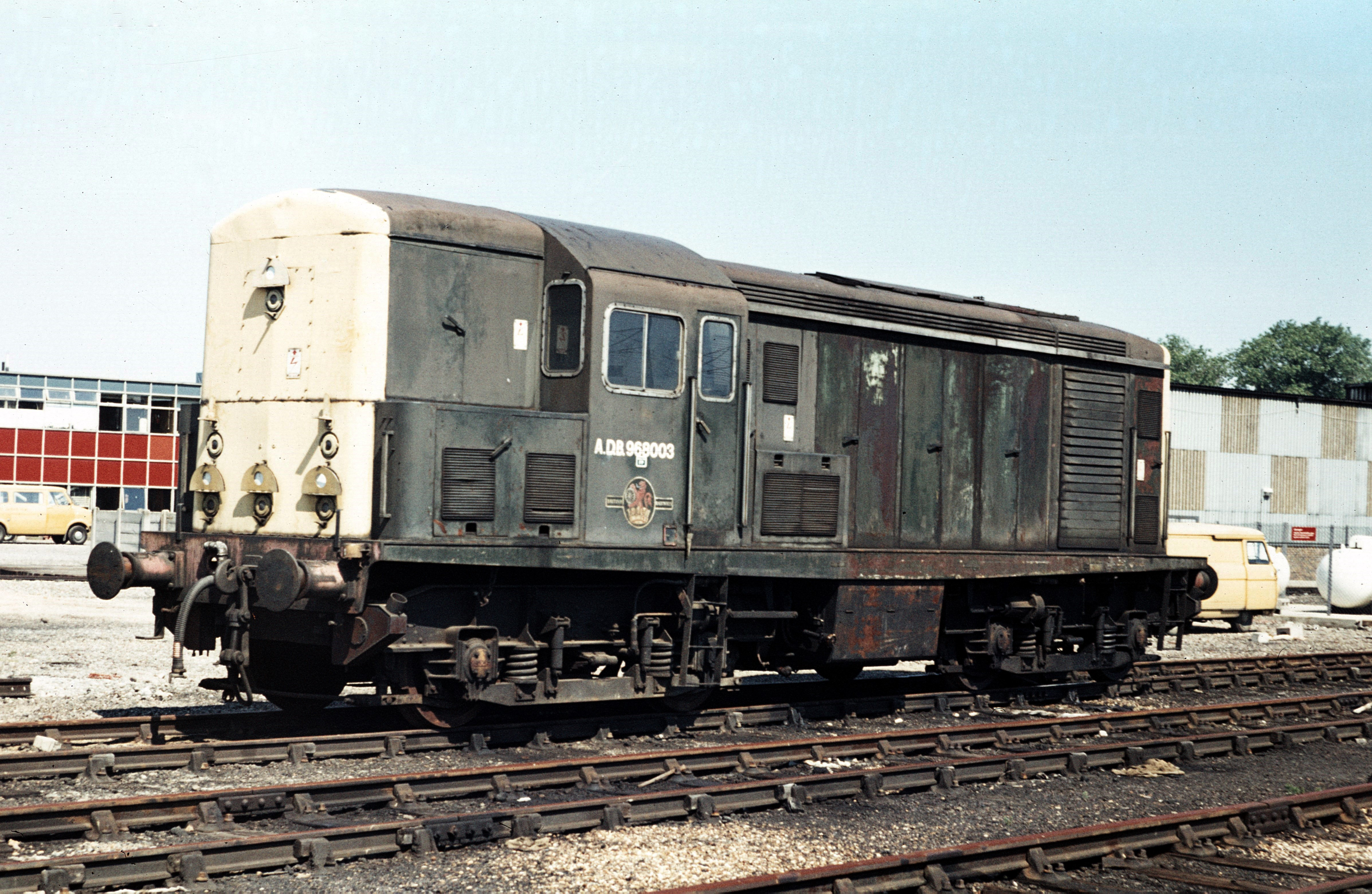
Withdrawn BTH Type 1, class 15, as a carriage pre-heating unit in 1977

The term 'road switcher' is not used in the UK. The nearest equivalents were some of the early Class A diesel locomotives of up to 1,000 bhp (750 kW). The original three mainline power classes were later recategorised as five, with these becoming Type 1. There would be five Type 1 classes built, as small batches from a range of manufacturers, in order to spread the experience of constructing the new diesel locomotives.

The 827 bhp (617 kW) LMS prototype 10800 was delivered in 1950. It had the Bo-Bo arrangement and a top speed of 70 mph (115 km/h), rather than the rigid 0-6-0 used for the 350 bhp (260 kW) low-speed shunting types. Two Pilot Scheme designs, the somewhat successful BTH Type 1 and the unreliable North British Type 1, were based on this.

They had their cabs near one end like the US road switcher, with the control equipment in a cubicle on the other side of the cab from the engine, generator and cooling group. Owing to the restricted British loading gauge, the engine bonnet had to reach to the cab roof level and so the driver's vision was restricted to just one side. As this was no worse than it had been with steam locomotives, it was not seen as a serious drawback and the second man on the footplate, originally the steam fireman, could keep a lookout on the other side. With moves to single-crewing a few years later, the second man was withdrawn and poor visibility now became an issue.

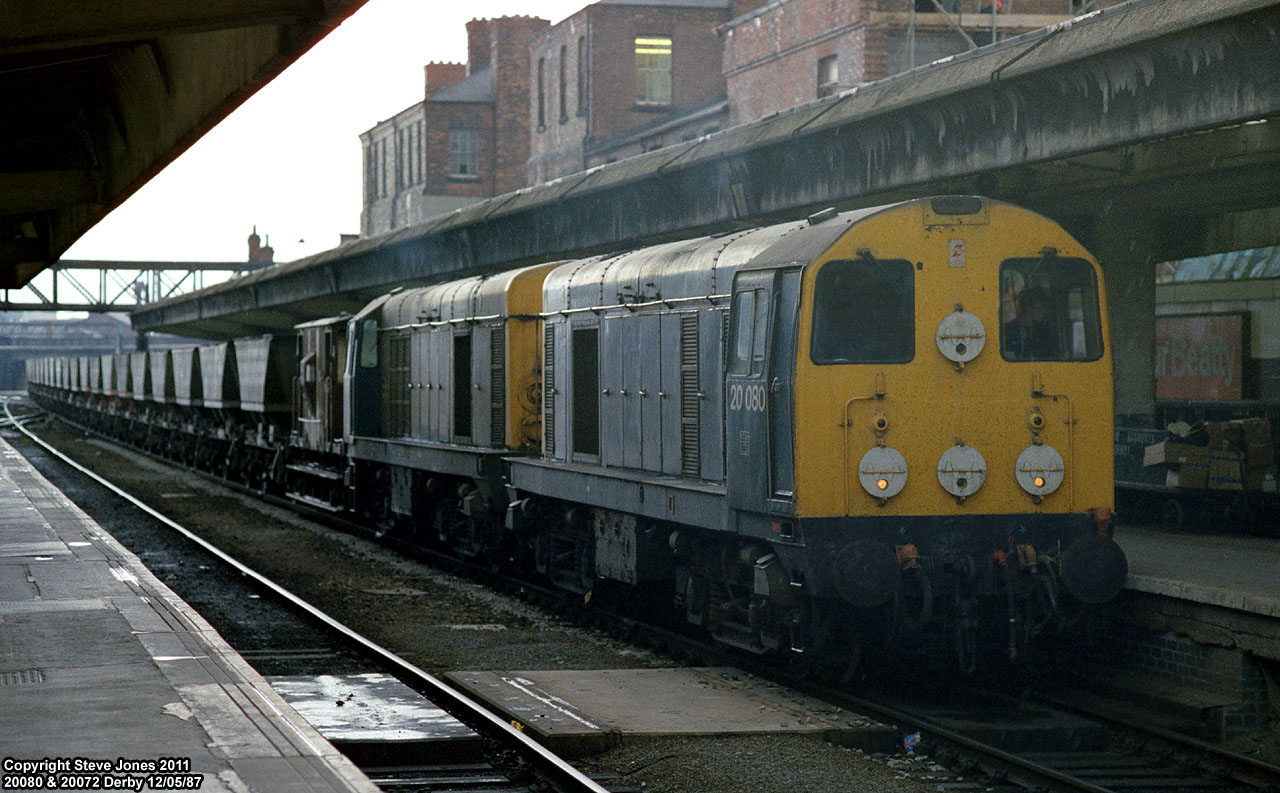
Class 20s coupled nose-to-nose at Derby

The later Swindon-built class 14 and Clayton Type 1 had low engine covers and a central cab to give better vision. However the Clayton required a redesign of the reliable Paxman engines from the earlier designs to a new, and unreliable, horizontal layout.

The most successful Type 1 locomotive was the larger, heavier and more powerful English Electric Type 1, which, as of 2024, still has some members in service 60 years later. In these the cab is at one end with a long, high engine bonnet and the longer body, both overall and ahead of the cab, meant that good driver vision could only be obtained when running cab-first. Even in the 1950s they were being used coupled in pairs, nose-to-nose.

One deliberate attempt to build a road switcher was the hydraulic transmission prototype DHP1, built by a consortium of Rolls-Royce, International Combustion and Clayton. Although it resembled the class 17 Clayton externally, the powertrain was entirely different. It used the ideas of Lieutenant Colonel L. F. R. Fell who had previously designed the unique mainline Fell locomotive to use combinations of smaller engines. Although a Type 3 overall, a power range that had been omitted from the early locomotive designs, this made it efficient when used for low-power low-speed shunting work too, allowing the same locomotive to be used economically as a Type 1, but then to do the work of a Type 3 at higher speeds.

After the Beeching Axe of the mid-1960s, the branch line network was reduced so much that it no longer generated the pick-up freight traffic for the network, or required the Type 1 locomotives themselves. The Type 1s were withdrawn: the Class 14s sold off to industrial operators, some 15s kept as carriage pre-heating units, the English Electrics reclassified as the Type 2 class 20 under TOPS and the remainder scrapped.

== Bibliography ==
- Clough, David N. (2005). "Early Post-Nationalisation Prototypes: No. 10800 and Hawk". Diesel Pioneers. Ian Allan. ISBN 978-0-7110-3067-1.
- Clough, David N. (2011). "Diesel-electric development after 1945". Hydraulic vs Electric. Ian Allan. ISBN 978-0-7110-3550-8.
