= British Rail Class 41 =

There have been three distinct types of British Rail locomotive that are referred to as Class 41.

- British Rail Class 41 (Warship Class), 1957-58 prototypes
- British Rail Class 41 (HST), 1972 prototype High Speed Train power cars
- List of British Rail unbuilt locomotive classes#Type 4 locomotives, an unbuilt class proposed in the 1990s
