= British Rail Class D3/1 =

Type and origin
- Power type: Diesel-hydraulic
- Builder: North British Locomotive Company
- Serial number: 27751–27761, 27995–27997
- Build date: 1958–1959
- Total produced: 14
Specifications
- Configuration
  - Whyte: 0-4-0 DH
  - UIC: B
- Gauge: 4 ft 8 1/2 in (1,435 mm) standard gauge
- Wheel diameter: 3 ft 9 in (1.143 m)
- Loco weight: 36.00 long tons (36.58 t; 40.32 short tons)
- Prime mover: NBL/MAN W6V17.5/22AS (supercharged)
- Transmission: Hydraulic, Voith
- MU working: Not fitted
- Train heating: None
Performance figures
- Maximum speed: 20 mph (32 km/h)
- Power output: Engine: 330 bhp (246 kW)
- Tractive effort: 24,100 lbf (107.2 kN)
Career
- Operators: British Railways
- Class: D3/1; later 3/4; no TOPS class
- Numbers: D2900–D2913
- Axle load class: Route availability 5
- Retired: February 1967
- Disposition: All scrapped

British Rail Class D3/1 was a locomotive commissioned by British Rail. It was a diesel powered locomotive in the pre-TOPS period built by the North British Locomotive Company. The NBL/MAN engines were built by the North British Locomotive Company in Scotland under licence from the German company MAN. They were introduced in 1958 and numbered D2900-D2913.

The first members of the class entered service at Devons Road TMD which was located in Bow, east London. They were employed to work sidings in the London docks area and exchange sidings with the Port of London Authority served docks. Other examples of the class were allocated to Rugby, Nuneaton and Edge Hill (Liverpool).

When Devons Road TMD closed in 1964 its locomotives were allocated to Stratford TMD for a short period before withdrawal. Other locomotives were re-allocated to Dallam (Warrington), Northampton, Crewe and Cricklewood, generally for short periods.

With declining goods traffic during the 1960s British Rail had a clear out of all non-standard classes of shunting locomotive and the Class D3/1 were withdrawn and scrapped by 1967.

Further examples of the class were sold direct to industry and one of these has survived into preservation carrying the number D2911. As of July 2021 it was at the Chasewater Railway.

== See also ==
- List of British Rail classes

== Sources ==
- Ian Allan ABC of British Railways Locomotives (Winter 1962/3 ed.). p. 203.
