= List of British Rail unbuilt locomotive classes =

There have been a number of TOPS class numbers assigned to proposed locomotives in the UK that have not been built for one reason or another.

== Diesel locomotives ==
=== Type 1 locomotives ===
- Class 18 – A proposed new Type 1 locomotive proposed in the mid 1980s. A 1988 proposal was for a 6-wheeled 800 hp locomotive with a maximum speed of 50 mph, similar in concept to Class 14. No prototype was constructed.

=== Type 3 locomotives ===
- Class 38 – Projected classification for new generation of 2000–2250 hp locomotives for Speedlink Distribution in the 1980s. The Class 38 was dropped in favour of the Class 60.

=== Type 4 locomotives ===
- Class 41 – The third use of Class 41 was for a proposed class of Class 60 locomotives with 2,500 hp engines in the early 1990s.
- Class 48 – The second use of Class 48 was a proposal for a new class of locomotive for the 1990s, with gearing differences for slower freight work or higher speed loco-hauled for InterCity or parcels trains. The proposal included using proven technology for engines and electrical systems to avoid lengthy introduction and development costs associated with developing new technology.

=== Type 5 locomotives ===
- Class 51 – Projected classification for the proposed "Super Deltic" locomotive intended as a follow on from the Class 50 and Class 55.
- Class 62 – Projected classification for proposed Type 5 coal train locomotives in the early 1990s.
- Class 65 – Projected classification for proposed 4,000 hp freight working locomotive intended for liner trains.

== Electro-diesel locomotives ==
- Class 75 – Spare classification for projected "super electro-diesel" follow on from Class 73 and Class 74.

== Electric locomotives ==
- Class 88 – The first use of Class 88 was for a proposed electric version of the Class 58, powered through 25 kV AC from overhead wire.
- Class 93 – Proposed electric locomotive for use on the West Coast Main Line as part of the InterCity 250 project.

== Sources ==
- Allen, Geoffrey Freeman (1981). The Eastern Since 1948. I. Allan. ISBN 9780711011069.
- Nock, O.S. (1985). British Locomotives of the 20th Century: Volume 3 1960-the present day. London: Guild Publishing/Book Club Associates. p. 75. CN9613.
- Webb, Brian (1982). The Deltic Locomotives of British Rail. David & Charles. ISBN 9780715381106.
