= British Rail Class D2/10 =

Diesel-hydraulic locomotive class (1957–1968)

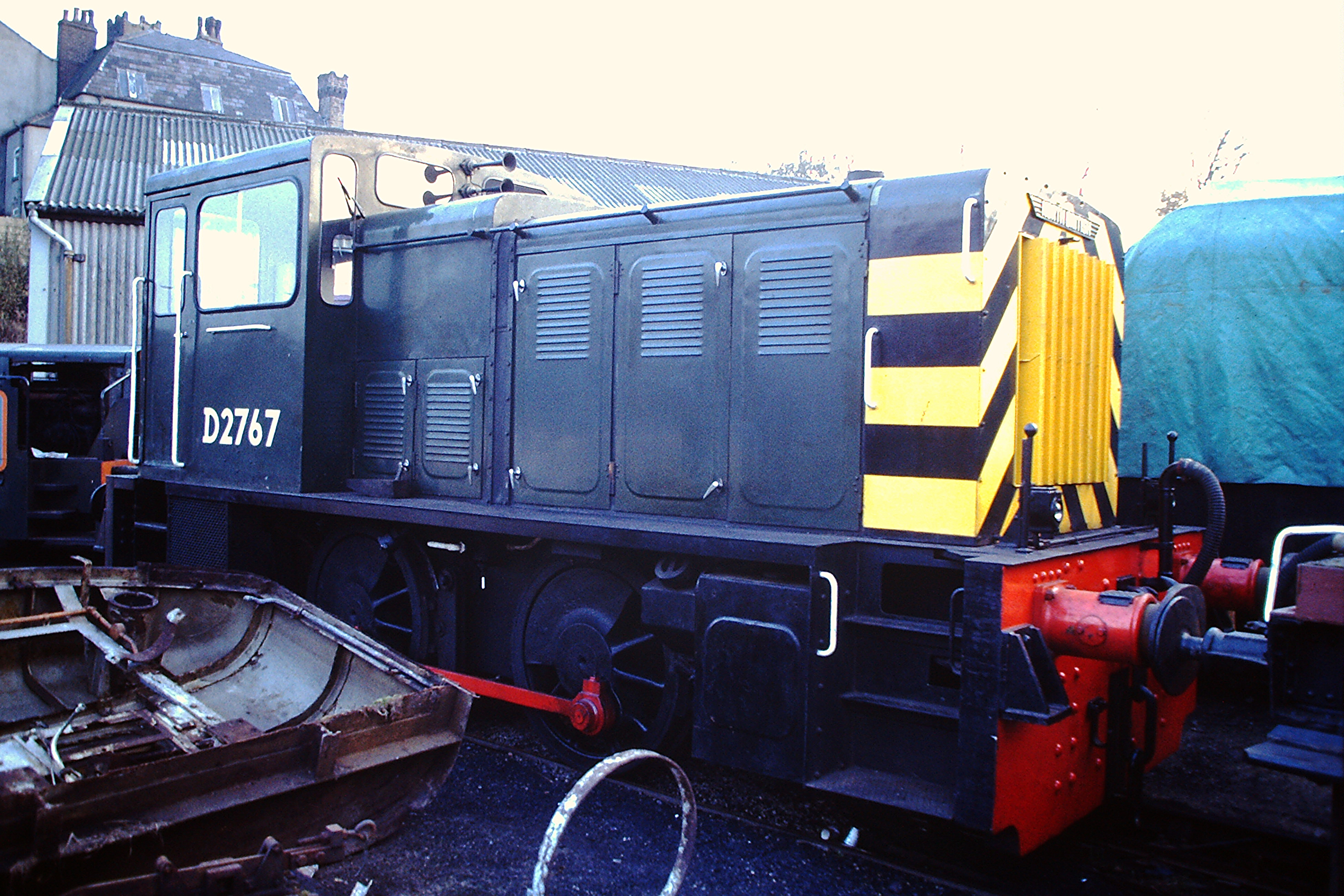
- D2767
Type and origin
- Power type: Diesel-hydraulic
- Builder: North British Locomotive Company
- Serial number: 27703–27714, 27815–27839, 27998–28033
- Build date: 1957–1961
- Total produced: 73
Specifications
- Configuration
  - Whyte: 0-4-0DH
  - UIC: B
- Gauge: 4 ft 8 1/2 in (1,435 mm) standard gauge
- Wheel diameter: D2708–D2719: 3 ft 6 in (1.067 m); D2720–D2780: 3 ft 9 in (1.143 m)
- Loco weight: D2708–D2719: 30.00 long tons (30.48 t; 33.60 short tons); D2720–D2780: 36.00 long tons (36.58 t; 40.32 short tons)
- Prime mover: NBL/MAN W6V
- Transmission: Hydraulic, Voith
- MU working: Not fitted
- Train heating: None
Performance figures
- Maximum speed: 15–17 mph (24–27 km/h)
- Power output: Engine: 225 bhp (168 kW)
- Tractive effort: D2708–D2719: 20,080 lbf (89.3 kN)
Career
- Operators: British Railways
- Class: DY11; later D2/10; later 2/4 (D2708–D2719), 2/4B (D2720–D2780)
- Numbers: (formerly 11708–11719 (D2708–D2719 from 1961 to 1963), D2720–D2780
- Axle load class: D2708–D2719: RA 2; D2720–D2780: RA 5
- Retired: 1967–1968
- Disposition: 2 preserved, remainder scrapped

British Rail Class D2/10 was a locomotive type commissioned by British Rail. It was a diesel-hydraulic shunting locomotive in the pre-TOPS period built by the North British Locomotive Company (NBL). The NBL/MAN engines were built by the North British Locomotive Company in Scotland under licence from the German company MAN. They were introduced in 1957 and numbered D2708-D2780.

After service with British Railways, D2767 was sold and in 1982 it was owned by Burmah Oil Trading Ltd., at Burmah Refinery in Stanlow. D2773 was sold to the National Coal Board, with it working in the South Wales Area at Cleynen South Colliery.

== Preservation ==
Two locomotives are preserved:

- D2767 at Bo'ness and Kinneil Railway.
- D2774 at Strathspey Railway

== Models ==
Two etched brass kits covering D2720-44 and D2745-80 is available in the range of Judith Edge Kits.

== See also ==
- List of British Rail classes
