= British Rail Class D2/11 =

Class of diesel-electric shunting locomotives

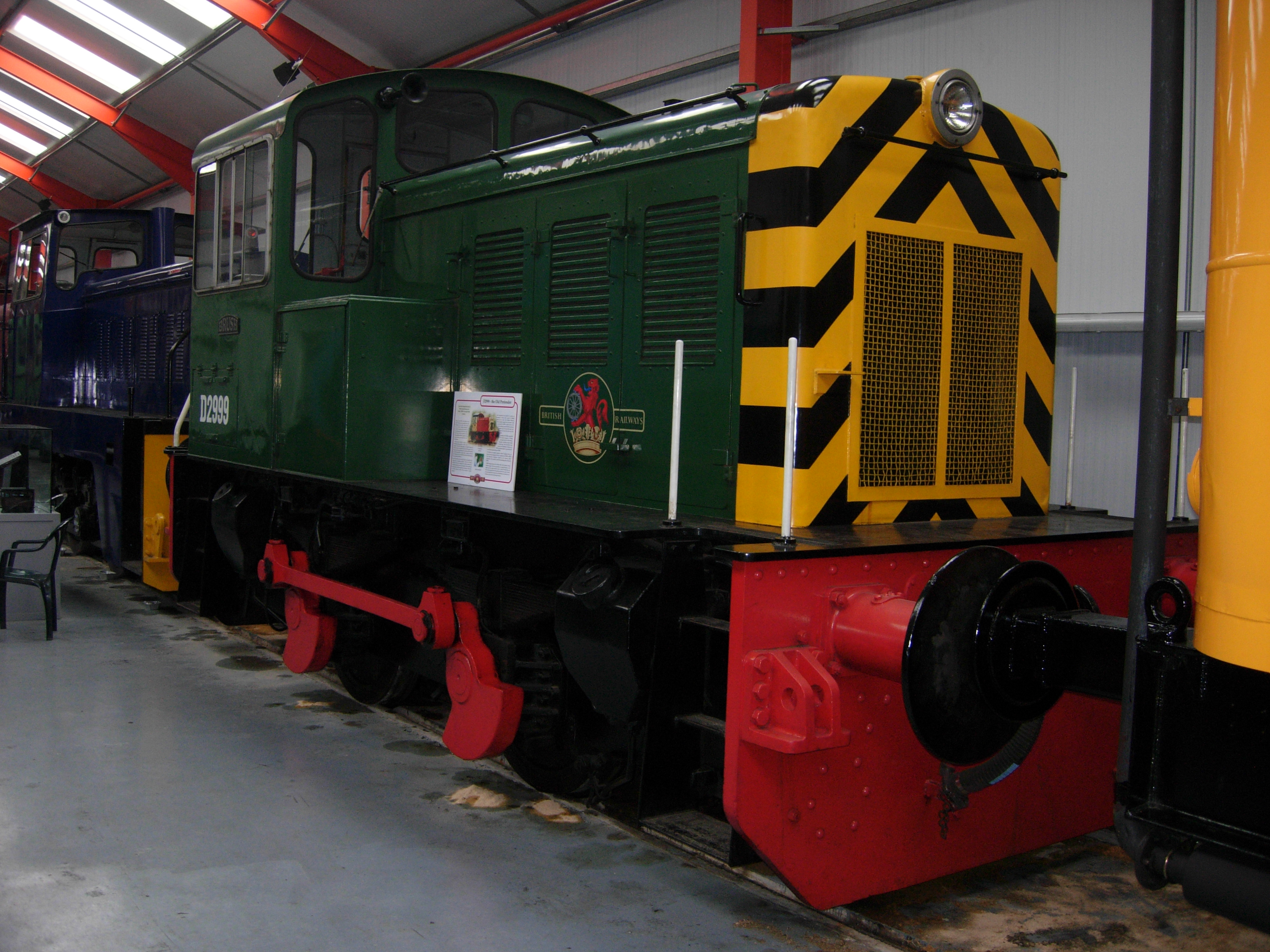
- D2999 on display at the Middleton Railway
Type and origin
- Power type: Diesel-electric
- Builder: Brush Traction and Beyer, Peacock & Company
- Serial number: Brush: 99–103; BP: 7857, 7861, 7858–7860
- Build date: 1960
- Total produced: 2
Specifications
- Configuration
  - Whyte: 0-4-0DE
  - UIC: B
- Gauge: 4 ft 8 1/2 in (1,435 mm) standard gauge
- Wheel diameter: 3 ft 6 in (1.067 m)
- Loco weight: 29.90 long tons (30.38 t; 33.49 short tons)
- Prime mover: Petter-McLaren LE6 or National M4AAV6
- Traction motors: Brush
- MU working: Not fitted
- Train heating: None
- Train brakes: None
Performance figures
- Maximum speed: 18 mph (29 km/h)
- Power output: Engine: 180 bhp (134 kW) or 200 bhp (149 kW)
- Tractive effort: 19,200 lbf (85.4 kN)
Career
- Operators: British Railways
- Number in class: 2
- Numbers: D2999 (bought); D9998 (loaned)
- Axle load class: Route availability 2
- Retired: D2999: October 1967
- Disposition: D2999 preserved, D9998 scrapped

The British Rail Class D2/11 was a British class of locomotive designed in 1958 by Brush Traction and Beyer, Peacock & Company, which co-operated to produce five prototype diesel-electric shunting locomotives of 0-4-0 wheel arrangement. They were intended to demonstrate a new generation of diesel shunters for industrial and mainline use. Two were loaned to British Railways for trials and one, number D2999, was subsequently purchased by BR. However, no large-scale orders resulted from these demonstrators.

Similar locomotives were built for industrial use, notably for steelworks in South Wales and Yorkshire. These were built by Brush Traction working with Bagnall.

== D2999 ==
D2999 was loaned by Brush Traction to British Railways (BR) from January 1960 and was allocated to Stratford TMD where it was subsequently allocated to the goods yard at Globe Road & Devonshire Street. The locomotive proved popular at Devonshire Street and in September 1960 and subsequently purchased by them for further use. It was classified as British Rail Class D2/11 at this point, and remained there bar the odd maintenance visit to Stratford, until 15 October 1967 when it was withdrawn. It was fitted with a National M4AAV6 engine of 200 hp (150 kW), had a maximum speed of 18 mph (29 km/h) and weighed 30 long tons (30.5 t; 33.6 short tons). A similar locomotive to D2999 is preserved on the Middleton Railway.

== D9998 ==
D9998 was on loan to BR for approximately a year from mid-1961. It was fitted with a Petter-McLaren engine of 200 hp (150 kW), had a maximum speed of 18 mph (29 km/h) and weighed 30 long tons (30.5 t; 33.6 short tons).

== Sources ==
- Ian Allan ABC of British Railways Locomotives (Winter 1962/3 ed.). p. 204.
