= British Rail 11104 =

British diesel-mechanical locomotive

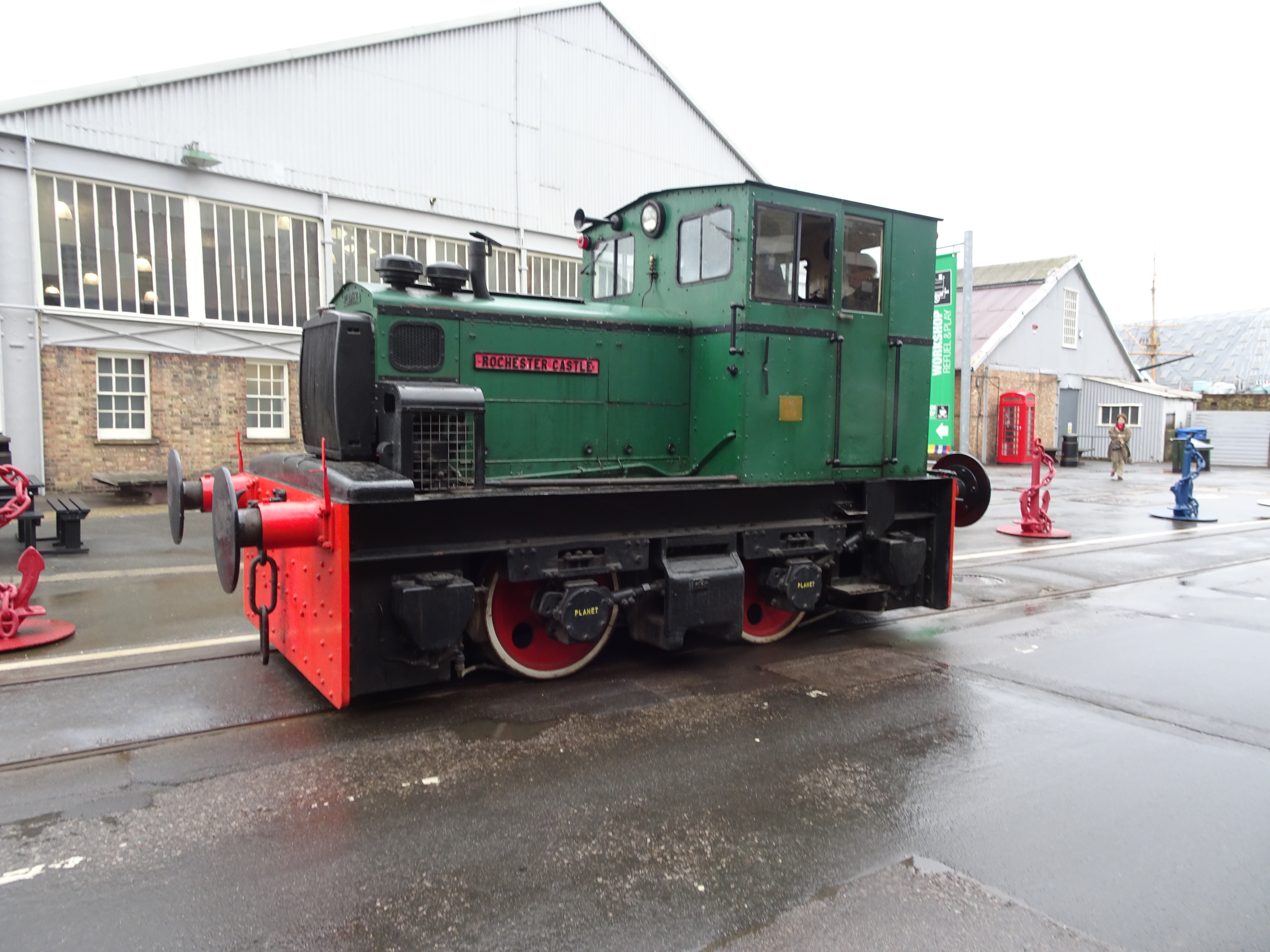
- A Hibberd 'Planet' Type 4w diesel-mechanical shunter similar to 11104
Type and origin
- Power type: Diesel-mechanical
- Builder: F. C. Hibberd & Co Ltd
- Build date: 1950
Specifications
- Configuration
  - Whyte: 4wDM
  - UIC: B
- Minimum curve: 1 chain (20.12 m)
- Loco weight: 11.00 long tons (11.18 t)
- Fuel type: Diesel
- Prime mover: English National Type DA4
- RPM range: 1,250 rpm maximum
- Engine type: 4-cylinder engine
- Transmission: Mechanical, spur-type 3-speed gearbox with roller chains
- MU working: Not fitted
- Train heating: None
- Loco brake: Air
- Train brakes: None
Performance figures
- Maximum speed: 15 mph (24 km/h)
- Power output: Engine: 52 hp (39 kW) At rail: 39 hp (29 kW)
Career
- Operators: British Railways
- Number in class: 1
- Numbers: 11104 (1950-53), 52 (1953-67)
- Axle load class: RA 1
- Retired: March 1967
- Disposition: Scrapped, J Cashmore, Newport

British Railways' 11104 was a 'Planet' Type 4w diesel-mechanical shunting locomotive built by F. C. Hibberd & Co Ltd in 1950. It was acquired by British Railways and given the running number 11104, but was later transferred to departmental use at the West Hartlepool Permanent Way Depot in 1953 and following this was renumbered 52. In 1965, it was transferred to the Southern Region of British Railways where it remained until it was withdrawn in March 1967. It was later scrapped by John Cashmore Ltd in Newport.

It used an 0-4-0DM/4wDM wheel configuration and was powered by an English National Type DA4 4-cylinder engine producing 52 hp (39 kW). This engine drove a 3-speed mechanical spur-type gearbox which drove the wheels via a roller chain final drive. The final power output at rail was 39 hp (29 kW).
