= British Rail DHP1 =

Clayton DHP1
Type and origin
- Power type: Diesel-hydraulic
- Builder: Clayton Equipment Company
- Serial number: 4337U1
- Build date: 1962-1963
- Total produced: 1
Specifications
- Configuration
  - UIC: B'B'
  - Commonwealth: B-B
- Gauge: 4 ft 8 1/2 in (1,435 mm) standard gauge
- Wheel diameter: 3 ft 3 1/2 in (1.003 m)
- Minimum curve: 4 chains (260 ft; 80 m)
- Wheelbase: 34 ft 0 in (10.36 m)
- Length: 46 ft 3 1/2 in (14.11 m)
- Width: 9 ft 0 in (2.74 m)
- Height: 12 ft 6 in (3.81 m)
- Loco weight: 56 long tons (57 t; 63 short tons)
- Fuel capacity: 600 imp gal (2,700 L; 720 US gal)
- Prime mover: Rolls-Royce C8TFL, 4 off
- Transmission: Hydraulic
- MU working: Not fitted
- Train heating: Steam
- Train brakes: Vacuum
Performance figures
- Maximum speed: 90 mph (140 km/h)
- Power output: Engines: 375 hp (280 kW) at 1,800 rpm × 4 At rail: 1,200 hp (890 kW)
- Tractive effort: Maximum: 37,500 lbf (167 kN)
Career
- Operators: British Railways
- Disposition: Scrapped

DHP1, meaning Diesel Hydraulic Prototype number 1, was a prototype Type 3 mainline diesel locomotive built between 1962 and 1963 by Clayton to demonstrate their wares to British Railways. It was designed for mixed traffic work, being equipped with steam heating facilities for working passenger trains. It was painted red, with the cab area above bonnet-level height painted cream.

Visually similar to their Class 17 Type 1 product, though longer, and with the radiator grilles in the ends of the engine covers rather than the sides. The locomotive saw little service, mainly around the International Combustion works in Derby. The locomotive was broken up by Clayton's in April 1967.

== Bibliography ==
- Vaughan, John (2011). The Rise and Fall of British Railways Main Line Diesel Locomotives. Haynes Publishing. ISBN 9781844256907 – via Internet Archive.
