= British Railways D0226 =

Prototype diesel shunting locomotive

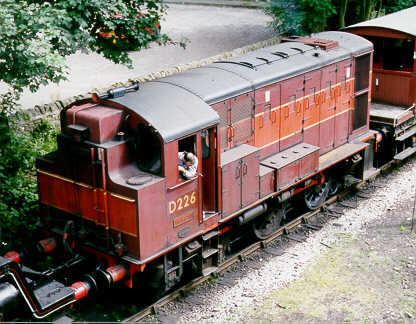
- D0226 in preservation at Haworth.
Type and origin
- Power type: Diesel-electric
- Builder: English Electric at Vulcan Foundry
- Serial number: English Electric: 2345; Vulcan Foundry: D226
- Build date: 1956
Specifications
- Configuration
  - Whyte: 0-6-0
  - UIC: C
- Gauge: 4 ft 8 1/2 in (1,435 mm) standard gauge
- Wheel diameter: 4 ft 0 in (1.219 m)
- Loco weight: 48 long tons (49 t; 54 short tons)
- Prime mover: EE 6RKT Mk II
- Generator: DC
- Traction motors: English Electric, DC 1 off
- Transmission: Diesel electric
Performance figures
- Maximum speed: 35 mph (56 km/h)
- Power output: 500 hp (370 kW)
- Tractive effort: 33,000 lbf (146.79 kN)
Career
- Operators: British Railways
- Numbers: D226 (D0226 from August 1959)
- First run: loaned 1957
- Withdrawn: October 1960
- Disposition: Returned to EE at Preston, to Keighley and Worth Valley Railway in March 1966

British Railways D0227
Type and origin
- Only differences from above are shown
- Power type: Diesel-hydraulic
- Serial number: English Electric: 2347; Vulcan Foundry: D227
Specifications
- Transmission: Krupp-Lysholm hydraulic
Career
- Operators: British Railways
- Numbers: D227 (D0227 from August 1959)
- Withdrawn: September 1959
- Disposition: Returned to EE at Robert Stephenson and Hawthorns, Darlington; scrapped at unknown date.

D0226 and D0227 were two prototype diesel shunting locomotives built in 1956 by English Electric at its Vulcan Foundry in Newton-le-Willows to demonstrate its wares to British Railways. They originally carried numbers D226 and D227, their Vulcan Foundry works numbers, but these were amended in August 1959 to avoid clashing with the numbers of new Class 40 locomotives.

They were both of 0-6-0 wheel arrangement and were fitted with English Electric 6RKT engines of 500 hp. They were painted black with an orange stripe along the middle of the bodyside, which turned into a 'V' at the nose end. The major difference between the two locomotives was that D0226 had diesel-electric transmission and D0227 had diesel-hydraulic transmission.

BR tested both locomotives at its Stratford depot in East London. D0226 has been preserved at the Keighley & Worth Valley Railway, but D0227 was scrapped.

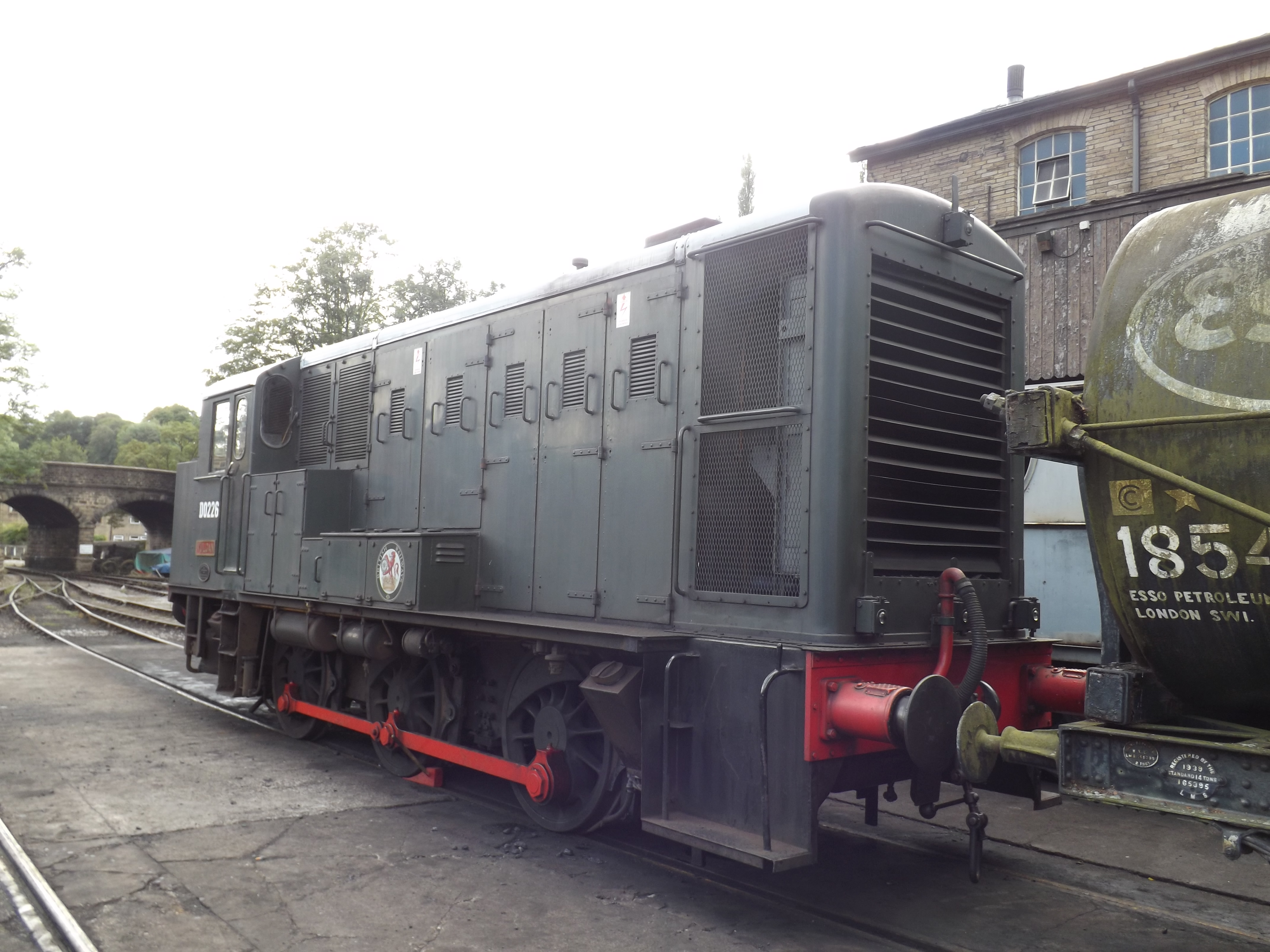
D0226 in green livery at Haworth
