= Route availability =

System for grading the railway network of Great Britain

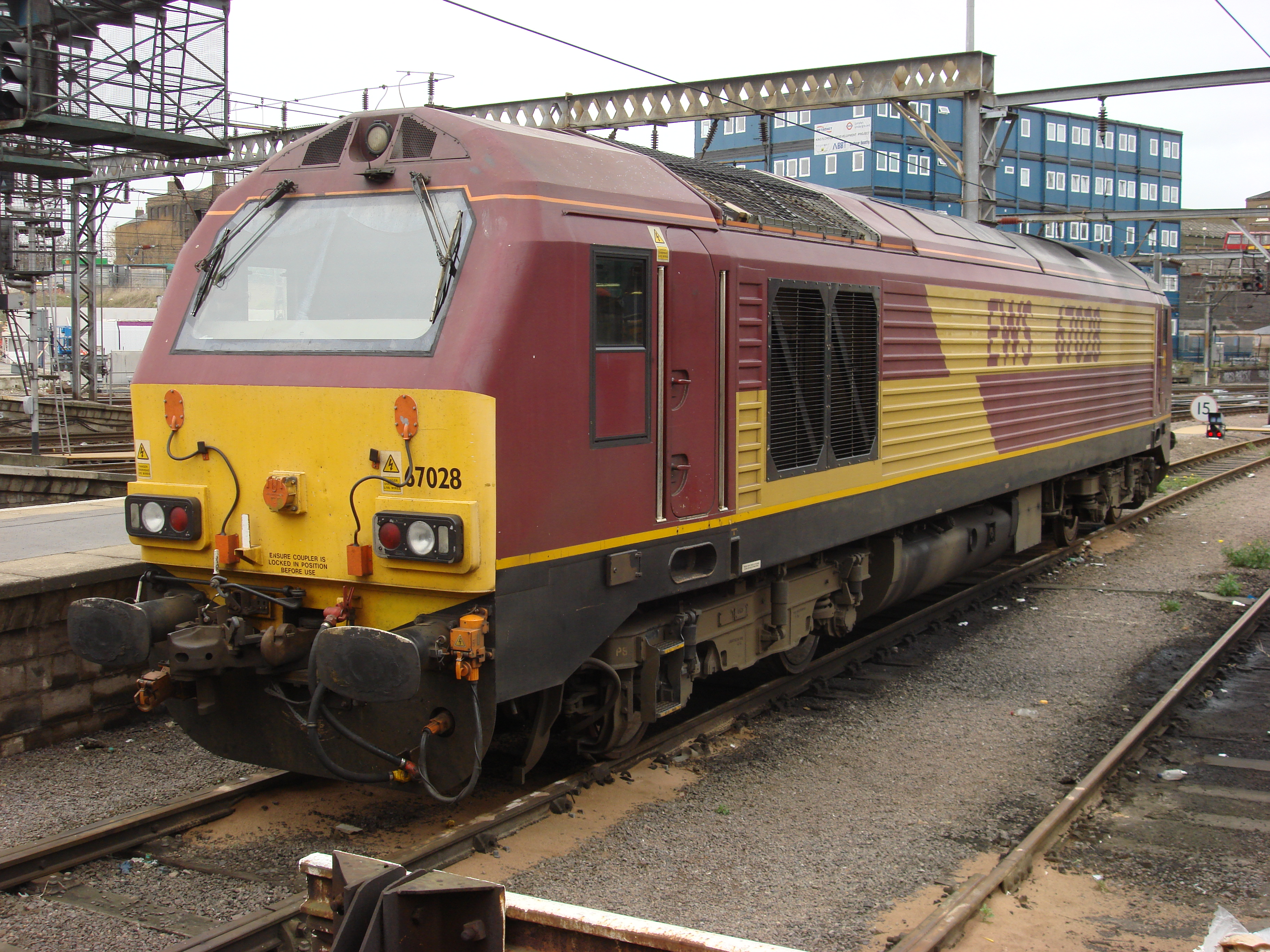
With its relatively high axle load, the Class 67 locomotive has a somewhat limited Route availability of 8

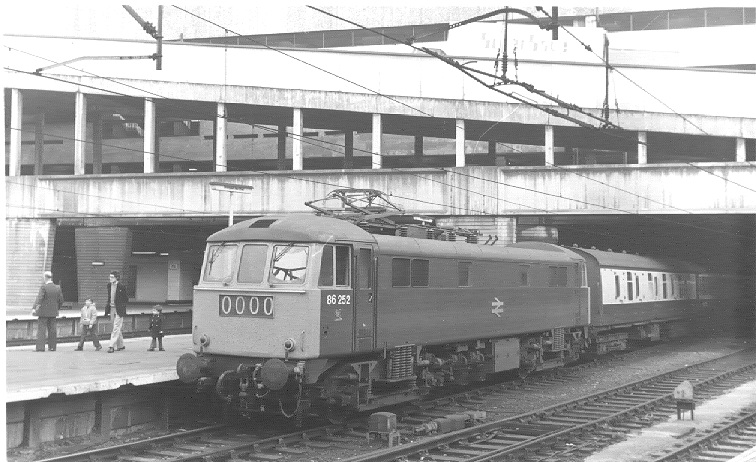
A Class 86/2 No. 86 252 at Birmingham New Street railway station. This class has a Route availability of 6.

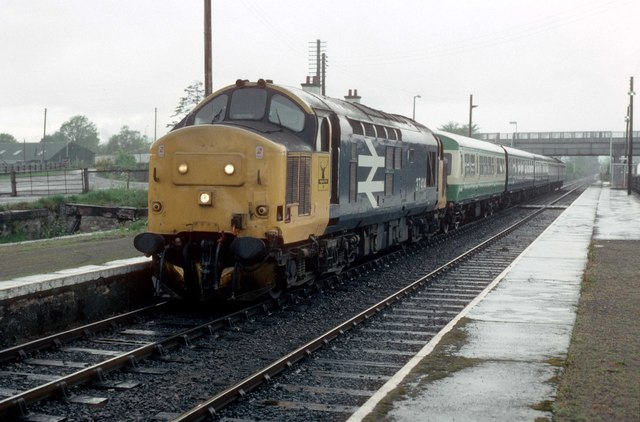
A Class 37 in British Rail large logo livery at Muir of Ord railway station, 1988 with a medium Route availability of 5.

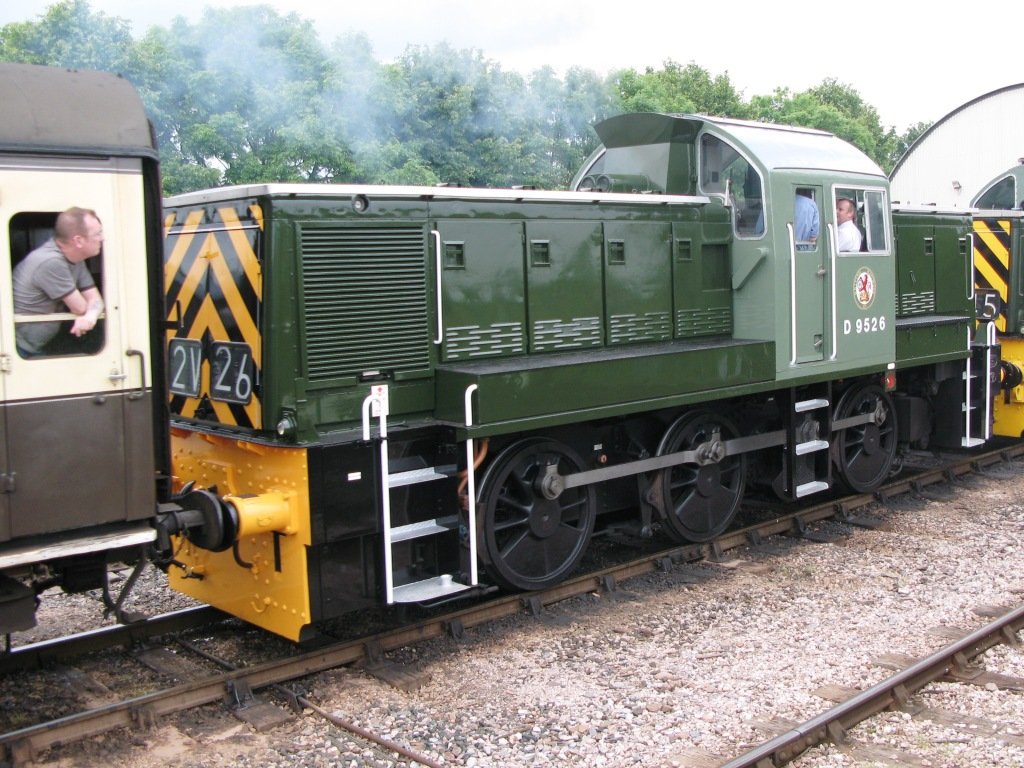
Class 14 No. D9526 (as preserved) at Williton on the West Somerset Railway a low axle load and less limited RA of 4.

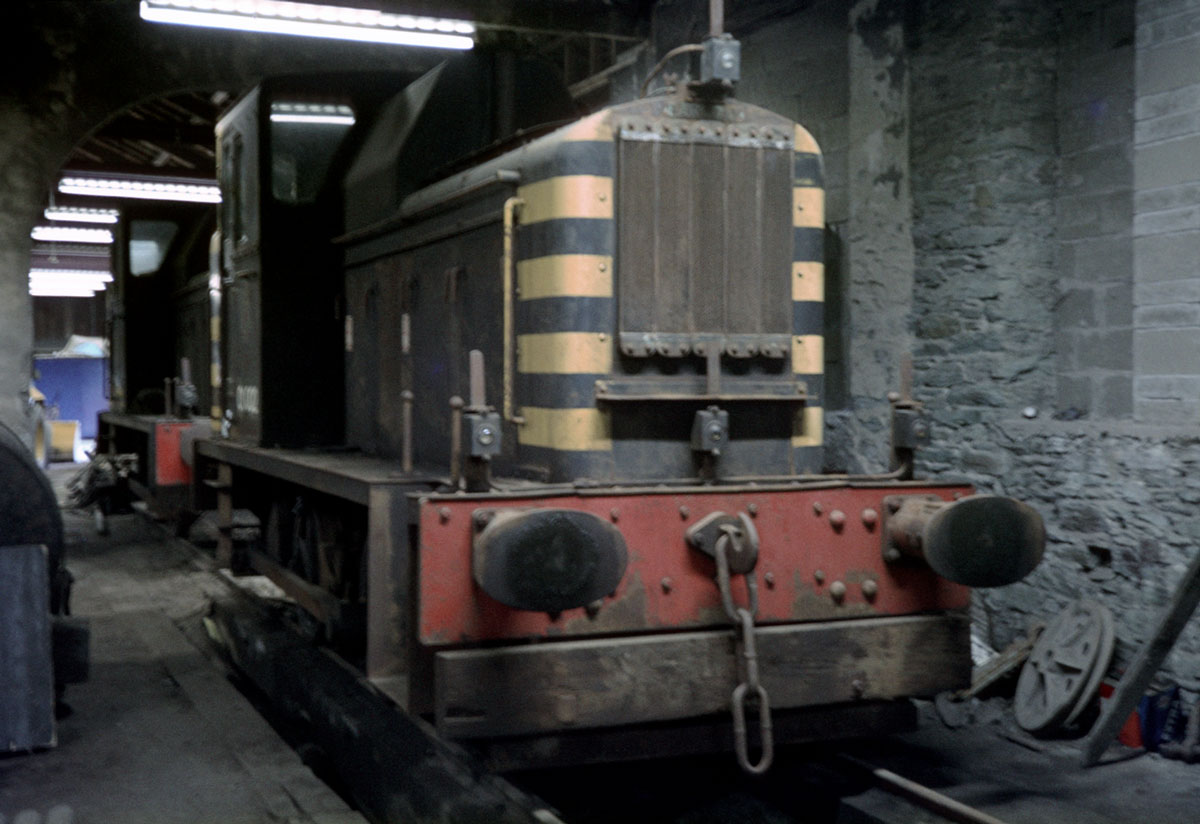
Class 01 shunter 01002 inside the shed at Holyhead Breakwater. The withdrawn loco 01001 is just visible at the rear. They had an RA of 1, and thus had the fewest axle load related restrictions put upon them.

Route Availability (RA) is the system by which the permanent way and supporting works (bridges, embankments, etc.) of the railway network of Great Britain are graded. All routes are allocated an RA number between 1 and 10.

Rolling stock is also allocated an RA (again between 1 and 10) and the RA of a train is the highest RA of any of its elements. The train must have a route availability (RA) lower than or equal to the RA of a line to be allowed to use it. The RA is primarily related to the axle load of the vehicle, although axle spacing is also taken into consideration. In practice it is the locomotive which governs where trains may operate, although many high capacity 4 axle wagons have a high RA when fully loaded. (When considering the operation of trains the loading gauge must also be considered.)

The system was first devised by the London and North Eastern Railway, and perpetuated by British Rail to ascertain which locomotives can work on which lines throughout the rail network in Great Britain.

Exemptions may be obtained to allow locomotives to operate on lines from which they may otherwise be banned. An exemption might be granted by placing a speed restriction over a weak bridge, for example.

== Line calculations ==
The route availability for a line is calculated by taking into account bridge strength, track condition, structural issues and so on. A route availability of one (RA1) is the most restricted line, open to possibly one type of locomotive specially designed for it. A route availability of 10 is the most open, usable by any locomotive that fits within the GB loading gauge that has been 'passed' for it (checked for conflicts with infrastructure such as platforms).

== Vehicle calculations ==
Route availability for a vehicle (locomotive or wagon) is generally based upon its axle loading. That is, how much of the laden weight of the vehicle is distributed on each axle. The more weight on each axle, the higher the RA number, and the more restricted the vehicle is. For wagons it is normal to have different RAs when running empty and full.

The RA of a locomotive must not exceed the RA of the track except under strictly controlled circumstances.

Thus a locomotive with RA1 is able to work on any line, although it will have a very light axle loading. An RA10 locomotive could only run on RA10 lines, placing severe restrictions on where it can be used.

If a vehicle has wheels that require significant balance weights, often found on steam locomotives, the dynamic loading resulting in what is termed the hammer blow action may affect the RA of the vehicle.

Network Rail currently gives the allowed axle loadings as follows:

Axle loading by Route Availability
Route Availability	Axle Load
RA3	≤16.5 tonnes
RA5	≤19.0 tonnes
RA6	≤20.3 tonnes
RA8	≤22.8 tonnes
RA9	≤24.1 tonnes
RA10	≤25.4 tonnes
EU average	≈22.5 tonnes

== Historical notes ==
Before nationalisation the Big Four railway companies had their own classification systems.

GWR's system for classification featured a coloured disc painted on the locomotive cab side to indicate its route availability:

GWR Route Availability
Disc colour	Axle load (long tons & cwt)	Axle load (lb)	Axle load (t)	Notes
(no disc)	up to 14 long tons 0 cwt	31,400 lb	14.2 t	
Yellow disc	14 long tons 0 cwt up to 16 long tons 0 cwt	31,400–35,800 lb	14.2–16.2 t	
Blue disc	over 16 long tons 0 cwt, up to 17 long tons 12 cwt	35,800–39,400 lb	16.2–17.9 t	
Red disc	over 17 long tons 12 cwt	39,400 lb	17.9 t	
Double red disc	22 long tons 10 cwt	50,400 lb	22.9 t	"King" class only

== See also ==
- Rail speed limits in the United States#Track classes
