= British Rail Class 14 =

1960s class of diesel-hydraulic locomotives

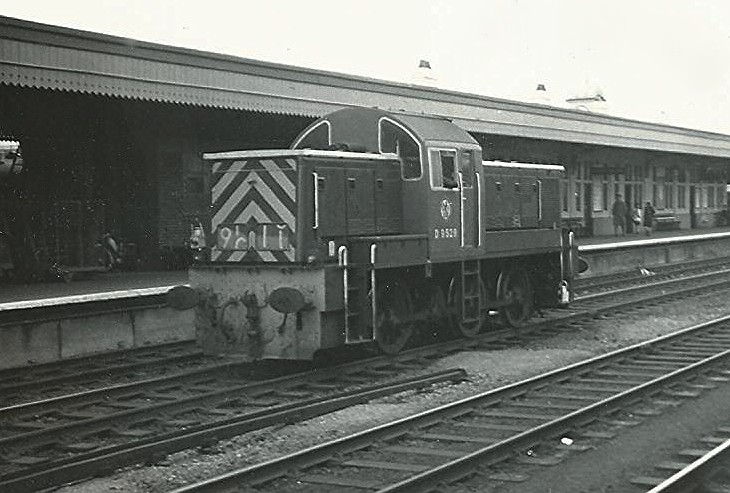
- D9528 at Cardiff in 1965
Type and origin
- Power type: Diesel-hydraulic
- Builder: British Railways' Swindon Works
- Order number: Swindon Lots 456 and 460
- Build date: 1964–1965
- Total produced: 56
Specifications
- Configuration
  - Whyte: 0-6-0DH
  - UIC: C
- Gauge: 4 ft 8 1/2 in (1,435 mm) standard gauge
- Wheel diameter: 4 ft 0 in (1.219 m)
- Minimum curve: 2 chains (40.23 m)
- Wheelbase: 15 ft 6 in (4.724 m)
- Length: 34 ft 7 in (10.541 m) over buffers
- Width: 8 ft 7.5 in (2.629 m)
- Height: 13 ft 0 in (3.962 m)
- Loco weight: 48.5 long tons (49.3 t; 54.3 short tons)
- Fuel capacity: 338 imp gal (1,540 L; 406 US gal)
- Prime mover: Paxman Ventura 6YJXL
- Transmission: Voith L217U hydraulic
- Train brakes: Vacuum
Performance figures
- Maximum speed: 40 mph (64 km/h)
- Power output: Engine: 650 hp (485 kW) @1,500 rpm At Rail at 6.5 mph (10.5 km/h): 388.5 hp (290 kW)
- Tractive effort: Maximum at 27.6% adhesion: 30,910 lbf (137.5 kN); Continuous at 6.2 mph (10.0 km/h): 23,500 lbf (104.5 kN)
Career
- Operators: British Rail; British Steel Corporation; National Coal Board
- Numbers: D9500–D9555
- Nicknames: Teddy Bear
- Axle load class: WR: Yellow; RA 4
- Withdrawn: 1968-1970
- Disposition: 19 preserved, 5 exported, 32 scrapped

The British Rail Class 14 is a type of small diesel-hydraulic locomotive built in the mid-1960s. Twenty-six of these 0-6-0 locomotives were ordered in January 1963, to be built at British Railways' Swindon Works. The anticipated work for this class was trip working movements between local yards and short-distance freight trains. The good all-around visibility from the cab and dual controls also made them capable of being used for shunting duties. The order was expanded from 26 to 56 in mid-1963, before work had started on the first order. They were numbered D9500-D9555.

== Technical details ==
In July 1964, the first of a class of 56 locomotives appeared from Swindon Works. These were later designated as TOPS Class 14 by British Railways. They are known as 'Teddy Bears' by enthusiasts, following a comment by Swindon Works' erecting shop foreman George Cole who quipped "We've built The Great Bear, now we're going to build a 'Teddy Bear'!"

In outline they have a cab offset from the centre with bonnets at each end, with a fixed 0-6-0 wheel configuration rather than bogies as seen on all the other Type 1 classes. The locomotives were powered by a Paxman 6-cylinder Ventura 6YJXL engine with a Napier turbocharger producing 650 bhp (485 kW), connected to a Voith L217U hydraulic transmission and Hunslet final drive. The axles were connected by coupling rods and driven by a jackshaft located under the cab, between the second and third axles. The plate frames were of 1 1/4 in (3.2 cm) inch steel and deep buffer beams almost to rail level. One was of similar thickness to the frames, the other of 5 in (13 cm) thick steel to act as ballast and to even out weight distribution.

== Operations and preservation ==
Originally all were allocated to depots on the Western Region of British Railways, but in January 1967 twenty were sent to Hull (Dairycoates) on the Eastern Region (ER), followed by thirteen more later the same year. At Hull they were intended for work around the docks, but the tasks were beyond the capabilities of a single locomotive; and since two locomotives required two sets of crew, they were not popular with the region. In 1968, all 33 ER locomotives were placed in storage, and were subsequently withdrawn on 1 April that year.

The Class 14s, like many other early diesel types, had an extremely short life with British Railways – in this case not because of poor reliability, but because many of its envisaged duties disappeared on the BR network as a result of the Beeching cuts. BR started to dispose of members of the class from mid 1968, and the entire class had been sold to industry or scrapped by the end of 1970. Many had a working life two to three times longer in industrial use than that with British Railways. The industries they worked, such as coal mining, declined during the 1970s and the class again became surplus to requirements. Many have since been preserved on heritage railways where they are ideal for both light passenger work and with works trains on the maintenance of permanent way.

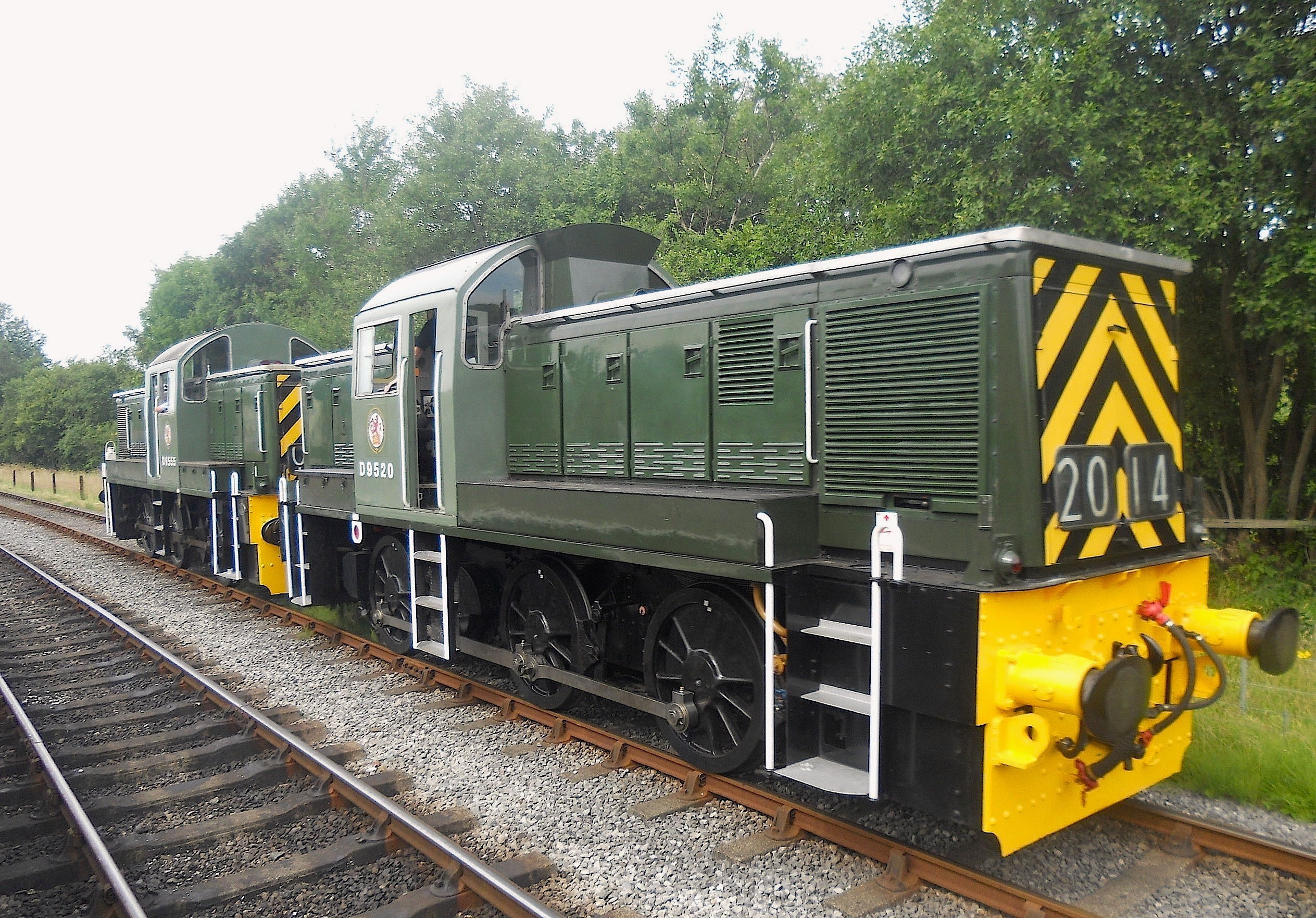
D9555 and D9520 run round their train at Rawtenstall on the East Lancashire Railway during the Class 14 at 50 Gala in July 2014

Unusually, D9504 was leased in 2005 from its preservation group and found itself in revenue-earning service on the newest mainline in the UK – High Speed 1 (known as the Channel Tunnel Rail Link during construction) – mainly in marshalling and stabling the 450 m (1,480 ft), 22-wagon concrete-pumping train on the final stretch to St. Pancras Station.

D9524 was re-engined under the ownership of BP Grangemouth. It was later re-engined again under the ownership of the Scottish RPS who, following BR practice, gave it the number 14901. It now operates with a Rolls-Royce DV8TCE (640 bhp) power unit.

The last of the class to be built, D9555, was the final locomotive constructed for British Railways at Swindon Works, in 1965; today it is privately owned and operates on the Dean Forest Railway, Gloucestershire – its original route.

In July 2014, the East Lancashire Railway hosted ten preserved members of the class as a celebration of the 50 years since their entry into service.

== Fleet ==
Distribution of locomotives, July/October 1967
British Rail Class 14 is located in England
Code	Name	Quantity
50B	Hull (Dairycoates)	25
82A	Bristol Bath Road	6
86A	Cardiff Canton	17
87E	Landore	8
Total:		56

Key:	Preserved	Scrapped	Exported

Loco	Final depot	Industrial career	Industrial Number	Dates	Disposal
D9500	86A	NCB Ashington	1	11/69–?	Preserved at Peak Rail
D9501	86A	—	–	—	Scrapped at C F Booth, Rotherham (June 1968)
D9502	86A	NCB Ashington	–	07/69–?	Preserved at East Lancs Railway
D9503	50B	BSC Harlaxton; BSC Corby Steelworks	65	11/68–07/74; 07/74–09/80	Scrapped at BSC Corby (09/80)
D9504	50B	NCB Lambton; NCB Philadelphia; NCB Bolden; NCB Burradon; NCB Ashington	506	11/68–08/73; 08/73–12/74; 01/75–09/81; 09/81–?	Preserved at Kent & East Sussex Railway
D9505	50B	APCM Hope, Derbyshire	–	09/68–05/75	Exported to Bruges, Belgium (05/75)
D9506	86A	—	–	—	Scrapped at Arnott Young Ltd., Parkgate (05/68)
D9507	50B	BSC Corby Steelworks	55	11/68–09/82	Scrapped at BSC Corby (09/82)
D9508	87E	NCB Ashington	9	03/69–01/84	Scrapped at D. Short, North Shields (01/84)
D9509	86A	—	–	—	Scrapped at G Cohen Ltd., Kettering (11/70)
D9510	50B	BSC Buckminster; BSC Corby Steelworks	60	12/68–06/72; 06/72–08/82	Scrapped at BSC Corby (08/82)
D9511	50B	NCB Ashington	–	11/68–07/79	Scrapped at NCB Ashington (07/79)
D9512	50B	BSC Buckminster; BSC Corby Steelworks	63	12/68–09/72; 09/72–02/82	Scrapped at BSC Corby (02/82)
D9513	86A	Arnott Young Ltd., Parkgate; NCB Crigglestone; NCB Astley; NCB Ashington	38	07/68–11/68; 11/68–09/69; 09/69–10/73; 01/74–?	Preserved at Embsay & Bolton Abbey Steam Railway
D9514	86A	NCB Ashington	4	07/69–12/85	Scrapped at NCB Ashington (12/85)
D9515	50B	BSC Buckminster; BSC Corby Steelworks; Hunslet Ltd	62	11/68–09/72; 09/72–12/81; 12/81–07/82	Exported to Charmartin, Madrid, Spain (07/82)
D9516	50B	BSC Corby Steelworks	56	11/68–10/81	Preserved at Didcot Railway Centre
D9517	86A	NCB Ashington	8	11/69–01/84	Scrapped at D. Short, North Shields (01/84)
D9518	86A	NCB Ashington	7	06/69–??/87	Preserved at West Somerset Railway
D9519	86A	–	–	–	Scrapped at G Cohen Ltd., Kettering (11/70)
D9520	50B	BSC Corby Steelworks BSC Glendon	45	12/68–03/81	Preserved at Mid-Norfolk Railway
D9521	87E	NCB Ashington	3	03/70–11/84	Preserved at Dean Forest Railway
D9522	86A	–	–	–	Scrapped at Arnott Young Ltd., Parkgate (05/68)
D9523	50B	BSC Corby Steelworks BSC Glendon	46	12/68–10/81	Preserved at the Wensleydale Railway
D9524	87E	BP Grangemouth	–	07/70–09/81	Preserved at Peak Rail
D9525	50B	NCB Lambton NCB Philadelphia; NCB Ashington	507	11/68–03/75; 03/75–10/87	Preserved by Heritage Shunters Trust
D9526	86A	APCM Westbury	–	01/70–04/80	Preserved at West Somerset Railway
D9527	86A	NCB Ashington	6	07/69–01/84	Scrapped at D. Short, North Shields (01/84)
D9528	86A	NCB Ashington	2	03/69–12/81	Scrapped at D. Short, North Shields (12/81)
D9529	50B	BSC Buckminster; BSC Corby Steelworks; Bardon Hill Quarry	61	08/68–09/72; 09/72–03/81; 02/09–06/10	Preserved – normally at Nene Valley Railway
D9530	86A	Gulf Oil Co.Ltd., Waterston; NCB Mardy Colliery; NCB Tower Colliery	–	09/69–10/75; 10/75–08/82; 08/82	Scrapped at NCB Tower Colliery (08/82)
D9531	86A	Arnott Young Ltd., Parkgate; NCB Crigglestone; NCB Burradon; NCB Ashington	31	07/68–11/68; 11/68–10/73; 10/73–04/74; 04/74–?	Preserved at East Lancashire Railway
D9532	50B	BSC Corby Steelworks	57	11/68–02/82	Scrapped at BSC Corby (02/82)
D9533	50B	BSC Corby Steelworks	47	12/68–09/82	Scrapped at BSC Corby (09/82)
D9534	50B	APCM Hope, Derbyshire	–	10/68—05/75	Exported to Bruges, Belgium (05/75)
D9535	86A	NCB Burradon; NCB Backworth; NCB Ashington	37	11/70–01/76; 01/76–09/80; 09/80–01/84	Scrapped at NCB Ashington (01/84)
D9536	87E	NCB Ashington	5	03/70–02/85	Scrapped at NCB Ashington (12/85)
D9537	50B	BSC Corby Steelworks	52	11/68–11/82	Preserved at Ecclesbourne Valley Railway
D9538	87E	Shell-Mex & BP Ltd., Shellhaven; BSC Ebbw Vale; BSC Corby Steelworks	–	04/70–02/71; 02/71–04/76; 04/76–09/82	Scrapped at BSC Corby (09/82)
D9539	50B	BSC Corby Steelworks	51	10/68–02/83	Preserved at Ribble Steam Railway
D9540	50B	NCB Lambton NCB Philadelphia; NCB Burradon; NCB Ashington	36	11/68–11/71; 11/71–06/72; 06/72–01/84	Scrapped at D. Short, North Shields (01/84)
D9541	50B	BSC Harlaxton; BSC Corby Steelworks	66	11/68–08/74; 08/74–08/82	Scrapped at BSC Corby (08/82)
D9542	50B	BSC Corby Steelworks	48	12/68–08/82	Scrapped at BSC Corby (08/82)
D9543	50B	—	–	—	Scrapped at C F Booth, Rotherham (11/68)
D9544	50B	BSC Corby Steelworks	53	11/68–09/80	Scrapped at BSC Corby (09/80)
D9545	50B	NCB Ashington	–	11/68–07/79	Scrapped by D. Short, North Shields (07/79)
D9546	50B	—	–	—	Scrapped at C F Booth, Rotherham (11/68)
D9547	50B	BSC Corby Steelworks	49	12/68–08/82	Scrapped at BSC Corby (08/82)
D9548	50B	BSC Harlaxton; BSC Corby Steelworks; Hunslet Ltd	67	11/68–08/74; 08/74–11/80; 11/80–07/82	Exported to Charmartin, Madrid, Spain (07/82)
D9549	50B	BSC Corby Steelworks; Hunslet Ltd	64	11/68–11/81; 11/81–07/82	Exported to Charmartin, Madrid, Spain (07/82)
D9550	50B	—	–	—	Scrapped at C F Booth, Rotherham (11/68)
D9551	50B	BSC Corby Steelworks	50	12/68–06/81	Preserved at Severn Valley Railway
D9552	50B	BSC Buckminster; BSC Corby Steelworks	59	09/68–06/72; 06/72–09/80	Scrapped at BSC Corby (09/80)
D9553	50B	BSC Corby Steelworks	54	11/68–?	Preserved at Vale of Berkeley Railway
D9554	50B	BSC Corby Steelworks	58	11/68–08/82	Scrapped at BSC Corby (08/82)
D9555	87E	NCB Burradon; NCB Ashington	–	03/70–02/75; 02/76–??/87	Preserved at Dean Forest Railway

== Models ==
Hattons Model Railways commissioned Danish company Heljan to produce a limited run in OO gauge in three liveries. Since then, they have announced plans for further examples, still in limited numbers, but in a wider variety of liveries.

In 2010, Graham Farish introduced a BR blue Class 14 in British N gauge.

Minerva Model Railways announced the production of a ready-to-run O gauge (7mm Finescale) model in May 2019. Delivery commenced in February 2022 following delays due to incorrect cab colour on the initial supplies.

In 2011 a 7 1/4" gauge model of D9522 won best locomotive and best model in show at the national model engineering exhibition in Harrogate.
