= Shrewsbury TMD =

Railway depot in England

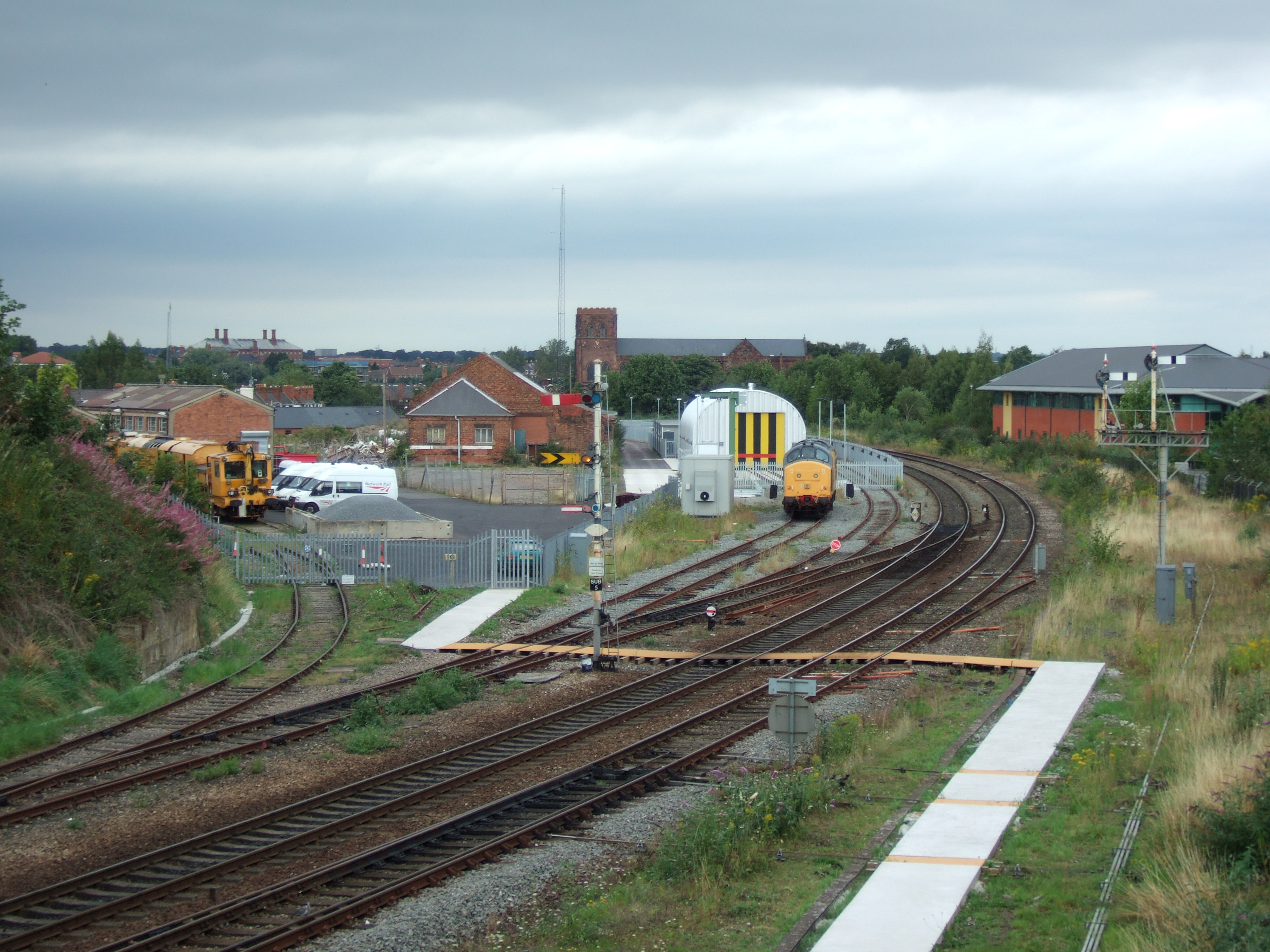
- Looking north from Sutton Bridge Junction, the Coleham Depot, which includes the TMD, is to the left of the main running line. To the right were once the extensive Coleham Sheds, which have now been completely demolished and the track lifted. A Network Rail 97/3 locomotive stands outside the main shed.
- Interactive map of Shrewsbury TMD

Location
- Location: Coleham, Shrewsbury, England
- Coordinates: 52.703°N 2.743°W
- OS grid: SJ498120

Characteristics
- Depot code: SB (1973-)
- Type: Diesel, Departmental

History
- Former depot code: 30 (LNWR); 4A (LMS); 84G (1948-1961); 89A (1961-1963); 6D (1963-1971)

Shrewsbury TMD is a railway traction maintenance depot (TMD) situated in Coleham, Shrewsbury, England. The TMD forms part of Coleham Depot, a permanent way depot operated by Network Rail. The code for the TMD is 'SB'.

== Location ==
The depot is situated at Sutton Bridge Junction, where the Cambrian Line connects with the Welsh Marches Line, approximately 500 metres (1,600 ft) to the south of Shrewsbury railway station. The TMD was constructed in 2008 on the site of rarely used permanent way sidings - which had themselves been built on the site of the former extensive joint GWR/LNWR goods yard - as part of the ERTMS project on the Cambrian Line. The depot became the base for Network Rail 97/3s (former Class 37 locomotives) for ERTMS testing on the Cambrian Line. The locomotives arrived in 2009 (see the allocation section below).

The new maintenance depot consists of a single-road inspection shed with an additional siding to one side to run round locomotives/store additional locomotives. There is also a small gantry. The site is fenced off from the main running line adjacent to it and is connected with the adjoining permanent way depot.

== Allocation ==
Although not always stabled at Coleham (sometimes one or more of the 97s are stabled at other locations, including Machynlleth) the four class 97/3s which are now regularly present here are:

- Network Rail 97301 (ex-37100)
- Network Rail 97302 (ex-37170)
- Network Rail 97303 (ex-37178)
- Network Rail 97304 (ex-37217) "John Tiley"

== Abbey Foregate ==
The Coleham Depot is the second location in Shrewsbury to have a depot code (since privatisation), the other being the long established Abbey Foregate Yard with 'SX'. This yard, located adjacent to Severn Bridge Junction at the southeast end of the station, is currently used for the stabling of DMUs by Transport for Wales and West Midlands Trains. There are no locomotives or shunters allocated at Abbey Foregate.

== History ==
The original locomotive servicing depot was built on the opposite side of the tracks to the current TMD, by the Shrewsbury and Hereford Railway (S&HR) in 1856, consisting of a single-road straight shed. As part of their joint-purchase of the S&HR, the Great Western Railway and the London and North Western Railway agreed to build a new six-road shed on the same site, designed using LNWR architecture principles, utilising the original S&HR shed as a wagon repair depot. In 1877 the LNWR built a new ten road shed of their own to the south of the site, closer to the running tracks. After the GWR absorbed the constituent railway companies in the area, in 1883 they built a new roundhouse to the rear/east of the existing former joint facilities, and added their own coaling stage. In 1932, the GWR demolished the old S&HR shed, and built a new steel-framed three road straight shed on the site. In 1937, the GWR renewed all roofing. The depot closed to all steam locomotives in March 1967.

== See also ==
- Railways of Shropshire
- List of British Railways shed codes
