= British carriage and wagon numbering and classification =

Classification schemes used for British carriages

A number of different numbering and classification schemes have been used for carriages and wagons on Britain's railways, and this page explains the principal systems. Carriages and wagons (either not self-propelled, or part of a multiple unit which has power units distributed throughout a semi-permanent formation of carriages) have frequently had similar arrangements for classification and numbering, so are considered together. There are also links to other pages that deal in greater depth with the particulars of individual types.

== Note on classification ==
Carriage and wagon classification has never been quite the same as locomotive and multiple unit classification. For most railways, specific types were identified by their Diagram Number. This could simply be arranged by consecutive number, or there could be some greater organisation of numbers so that similar types were grouped together.

However, carriages and wagons have rarely been referred to in general terms by their Diagram Number. Instead there have been a variety of other codes and designations, referring to generic designs rather than specific types. For instance, there were the BR (adapted from the LNER system) and LMS carriage codes, which indicated interior layout or usage. The Great Western Railway (GWR) identified some of their non-passenger carriages and wagons through a series of animal designations, including sea life for departmental (non-revenue earning) stock, followed by a letter for detail differences, e.g. Beetle A.

The majority of the sections below deal solely with carriage and wagon numbering series, though where a particular classification system was used this is also described.

== Pre-nationalisation arrangements ==
Before nationalisation in 1948, each railway company had its own numbering arrangements.

- The Great Western Railway and London, Midland and Scottish Railway (from 1933) adopted a system which allocated number ranges within a series for different types.
- The Southern Railway followed a similar approach, but used two series; for passenger carriages and for non-passenger carriages.
- The London and North Eastern Railway numbered its carriages with the first digit indicating the area it was allocated to.
- The Great Western Railway Diagram Numbers included a letter to indicate the general layout or usage, followed by a serial number issued consecutively.

== British Railways ==
British Railways inherited the stock of the 'Big Four' and a substantial number of 'Private Owner' wagons. It also inherited the stock of the Pullman Car Company when it was nationalised in the late 1950s.

=== Numbering system ===
==== Arrangements at Nationalisation ====
The numbers of carriages and wagons inherited from the 'Big Four' companies were left unchanged, but with a prefix letter to show where they had originated from, as follows:

E:	London & North Eastern Railway
M:	London Midland & Scottish Railway
S:	Southern Railway
W:	Great Western Railway

A "D" prefix in front of the regional prefix indicated departmental (non-revenue earning) stock. Departmental stock (including locomotives) inherited from the Southern Railway carried numbers with an "S" suffix (indicating Service stock, an alternative term for departmental) which was deleted and replaced with the "DS" prefix.

Former 'Private Owner' wagons, owned by industrial concerns rather than the railway companies, had a prefix letter "P" but were renumbered into a new series commencing at 3000.

Some carriages and wagons built by British Railways to the designs of the 'Big Four' companies were numbered in their series and carried the appropriate letter prefix. BR then introduced its own number series, for wagons beginning with B. Initially most designs were based on, or similar to, those of the pre-Nationalisation companies.

==== Arrangements from 1951 ====
In 1951, the first production carriages built to British Railways' designs appeared, known as the Mark I. Numbers had a prefix letter (or letters) to indicate the region to which the carriage was allocated, and responsible for the maintenance. The inherited carriages then had a suffix letter indicating the company of origin.

New carriages had no suffix: when Pullman Company carriages were added, their numbers carried both prefix and a suffix (indicating regional allocation), as did the 2 tier car carriers built for the East Coast services.

The regional allocation letters used were:

E:	Eastern Region
GE:	Great Eastern lines
M:	London Midland Region
NE:	North Eastern Region
S:	Southern Region
SC:	Scottish Region
W:	Western Region

Wagons retained the existing prefixes indicating their origin, and new stock built to British Railways designs was given a "B" prefix.

British Railways adopted the following numbering system for carriages and wagons built to its own designs (a small number of types built to pre-Nationalisation designs were later allocated numbers in this series, but only following rebuilding to new types). Note that in this table, reference is made to first, second and third class; from June 1956, second class was abolished and third class was renamed second class (and again to standard class in 1987). The few BR-design second class carriages (intended for use in Boat Trains since ships had three classes of accommodation) were designated as first class or unclassified.

Numbers	Description	Notes
1–1999	Restaurant and catering cars	1–999 first class and 1000–1999 third and unclassified; restaurant cars without kitchen facilities took the lowest numbers in each range. Pullman cars, after nationalisation of the Pullman Company, took numbers from 500 upwards.
2000–2899	Sleeping cars	2000–2399 first class, 2400–2499 composite, 2500–2799 third. Conversions of third class cars to "either class" took numbers in the 28xx series.
2900–2999	Royal saloons	All Royal Train vehicles numbered in this series from 1977. The Discotheque car (for use in football excursion special trains) took number 2990.
3000–8999	Open cars	3000–3499 first class, 3500–3599 second class, 3700–6199 third class. Declassified first class cars took numbers in the 36xx, 62xx, 64xx and 68xx series. Cars fitted with buffet facilities took numbers in the 352x, 65xx, 66xx and 67xx series. Various special vehicles took numbers in the 626x, 63xx and 69xx series. The 7xxx series was used for Composite Corridor cars renumbered from 15xxx and 16xxx.
9000–12999	Brake open cars	9200–9599 third class. Cars fitted with buffet facilities took numbers in the 90xx and 91xx series. Cars fitted with a driving cab took numbers in the 97xx series. Open cars rebuilt with a brake compartment took numbers in the 98xx series. 10000–12999 used for Mark 3 vehicles onwards (see below).
13000–14999	First class corridor cars	Cars with brake compartments numbered 14xxx.
15000–23999	Composite corridor cars	Cars with brake compartments numbered 21xxx. The 17xxx series was used for Brake First Corridor cars renumbered from 14xxx and Mark 3 Brake First Open cars. The 18xxx/19xxx series was used for Standard Corridor cars renumbered from 25xxx/26xxx.
24000–39999	Third class corridor cars	Cars with brake compartments numbered 34xxx/35xxx. Post-privatisation, the 38xxx/39xxx series have been used for electric multiple unit vehicles.
40000–59999	Non-gangwayed cars	41xxx composite, 43xxx composite (lavatory), 46xxx third class, 48xxx third class (open), 53xxx third class (brake compartment). After the 5xxxx series was reallocated for diesel mechanical multiple unit cars in 1955, the Brake Thirds were renumbered 43100 upwards. After withdrawal of all these cars, the 4xxxx series was reused for InterCity 125 and Advanced Passenger Train vehicles (see below).
50000–54999	Single-ended Driving Motor Diesel Mechanical Multiple Unit cars	The 53xxx series was used for cars renumbered from 50xxx and the 54xxx series for cars renumbered from 56xxx, with 549xx later used for Driving Trailers converted to carry parcels.
55000–55999	Double-ended Driving Motor Diesel Mechanical Multiple Unit cars	Parcels cars numbered in the 559xx series (later including single-ended Driving Motors converted from passenger stock).
56000–58999	Driving Trailer Diesel Mechanical Multiple Unit cars	
59000–59999	Trailer Diesel Mechanical Multiple Unit cars	
60000–60999	Diesel Electric Multiple Unit cars	Motor vehicles from 60000 upwards and trailer vehicles from 60500 upwards.
61000–67999	Motor Electric Multiple Unit cars	Cars numbered below 64000 were mainly, but not all, non-driving motors; those numbered 64xxx or 65xxx were all driving motors.
68000–68999	Parcels Electric Multiple Unit cars	
69000–69999	Restaurant and catering Electric Multiple Unit cars	
70000–74999	Trailer Electric Multiple Unit cars	
75000–78999	Driving Trailer Electric Multiple Unit	Some 78xxx numbers used for diesel electric multiple unit cars with one engine removed.
79000–79999	Diesel Multiple Unit cars (pre-Modernisation Plan designs)	Post-privatisation, the 790xx series has been used for electric multiple unit vehicles.
80000–80199	Kitchen cars	
80200–80499	Travelling Post Office cars	Conversions of vehicles used in postal trains numbered in 802xx series.
80500–99999	Hauled non-passenger carrying cars	80500–81999 full brake vans, 85xxx newspaper vans; 86xxx general utility vans, 87000–88999 fish vans, 92xxx fruit vans, 94xxx covered carriage trucks, 95xxx and 96xxx car carriers and horse boxes, 992xx and 995xx bullion vehicles, 996xx exhibition vans. 82xxx used for Mark 3 vehicles onwards (see below). There was considerable renumbering of cars in this series to reflect conversions, including reuse of the 92xxx and 94xxx series.

Numbers 100000 to 999999 were used for non-passenger rated stock (including wagons, vans and departmental (non-revenue earning) carriages), while internal user vehicles (stock used for internal purposes (e.g. stores) at specific locations and unlikely to move) took numbers in the 0xxxxx series. For more details see below.

The same series was used for Mark 2 coaches built in the 1960s, but when Mark 3 carriage was introduced in the early 1970s new number ranges were carved out of the old series. These new ranges were perpetuated for Mark 4 carriages in the 1980s, and were as follows:

10000	-	10499	Restaurant and Kitchen
10500	-	10999	Sleeper
11000	-	11899	First class
11900	-	11999	Composite First & Second class
12000	-	12999	Second class
40000	-	40999	High Speed Train Restaurant & Kitchen
41000	-	41999	High Speed Train First class
42000	-	42999	High Speed Train Second class
43000	-	43999	High Speed Train Driving Motor
44000	-	45999	High Speed Train Second class Brake
48000	-	48999	Advanced Passenger Train Trailer
49000	-	49999	Advanced Passenger Train Motor
82000	-	82999	Driving Van Trailer

Diesel multiple unit builds in the 1980s utilised the 52xxx, 55xxx, 57xxx and 58xxx series for carriages, all of which were motored. The 55xxx and 58xxx contained a mix of driving and non-driving motors, but the 52xxx and 57xxx cars were all driving motors. Some series have been used for conversions of carriages, e.g. 63xx has been used for a variety of miscellaneous carriages, including generator vans and observation saloons.

A major change came in May 1983 when prefix and suffix letters was abandoned, and any carriage that had the same number as another carriage or a locomotive was renumbered. The programme worked as follows:

14000-14999	to	17000-17999	to avoid clashing with Southern Railway carriages
16000-16499/ 15500-15999	to	7000-7999	to avoid clashing with Southern Railway carriages
25000-26999	to	18000-19999	to avoid clashing with Class 25 and 26 locomotives
40000-40099	to	40400-40499	to avoid clashing with Class 40 locomotives
50000-50999	to	53000-53999	to avoid clashing with Class 50 locomotives
56000-56999	to	54000-54999	to avoid clashing with Class 56 locomotives
81000-81999	to	84000-84999	to avoid clashing with Class 81 locomotives
85500-85599	to	94000-94099	to avoid clashing with Class 85 locomotives
86000-86999	to	93000-93999	to avoid clashing with Class 86 locomotives

Further renumberings have taken place as new locomotives were introduced. Most have involved only a handful of carriages, but a major one saw carriages in the 920xx series renumbered 929xx when Class 92 locomotives were introduced.

This series has been perpetuated, though the series have been adapted for new generation multiple unit stock. For instance, the latest diesel multiple units have reused the 50xxx and 79xxx series for driving motors and the 56xxx series for non-driving motors. In the electric multiple unit series, Class 390 Pendolinos have reused the 68xxx and 69xxx series.

When BR began to build air braked wagons they had B prefixes, but this was dropped and six-figure numbers were used without prefix. Prefixes were added, however, if and when carriages and wagons transferred to the departmental/engineers' fleets.

Privately owned wagons and carriages were allocated numbers with an integral prefix to differentiate them from the BR number series, with carriages taking numbers in the 954xx and 99xxx series. From 1986, those carriages in the 99xxx series which otherwise duplicated BR bullion and exhibition van numbers were renumbered, and from then on the prefix was not essential for identification. Post-privatisation, with all carriages being privately owned, this list was discontinued and many carriages reverted to carrying their original BR number.

==== Departmental and Internal User Stock ====
Most departmental and internal user vehicles are converted from revenue-earning stock; only a small number are built for non-revenue earning use. Initially stock inherited from the 'Big Four' companies was given regional prefixes (e.g. DE, DM, DS and DW) indicating their origin, and adapting existing number series.

From about 1951, British Railways started to use new numbering series for additions to departmental and internal user stock on a regional basis, as follows:

Region	Departmental Carriages	Internal User Stock
London Midland	DM395000 onwards	020000 onwards
Eastern and North Eastern	DE320000 onwards	040000 onwards (a separate series commencing at 042000 was initially used for the North Eastern Region but later abandoned and these numbers have now been reused by the Eastern Region series)
Western	DW150000 onwards	Various series used in 06xxxx and 07xxxx ranges (only that commencing at 060900 now in use)
Southern	DS1 onwards (existing SR series) and DS70000 onwards (from 1957)	080000 onwards
Scottish	No separate series used	095xxx, 096xxx, 097xxx and 099xxx series used

No prefix letters were used for internal user stock. Departmental wagons (and some passenger-rated non-passenger carrying coaching stock) often kept their original revenue earning stock number, but with the addition of the "D" prefix. On some occasions, passenger coaches that had been converted for use as wagons then entered departmental stock retaining their wagon number (most notably brake vans in the 963xxx series that were formerly passenger brake vehicles).

By the end of the 1960s, British Rail-built carriages were entering departmental stock and being allocated one of the regional prefixes according to their location, but from 1967 the "DB" prefix was introduced for all additions to departmental stock regardless of origin. This prefix was prefixed with a letter to indicate the use of the vehicle, as follows:

A:	Mechanical & Electrical Engineers
C:	British Rail Engineering Ltd
K:	Signalling & Telecommunications
L:	Mechanical & Electrical Engineers Electrical Construction
R:	Research
T:	Traffic
X:	Stores
Z:	Public Relations & Publicity

The principal numbering series for carriages with the "DB" prefix have been 975xxx, then 977xxx. The latest series to be used is 971xxx. Carriages built new into departmental stock have usually been numbered in the 999xxx (and sometimes 998xxx) series (though this series also contains some conversions too).

Also in the early days of the "DB" prefix, some departmental locomotives were numbered in the 966xxx and 968xxx series, though in recent years those locomotives that remain self-propelled have been allocated locomotive Class 97.

=== TOPS CARKND classification system ===
When the Total Operations Processing System was introduced by British Railways, classifications were applied to all carriages and wagons and recorded in a field called CARKND, which is now also used to refer to the classification system as a whole. The classification typically comprises three letters, the first of which indicates the broad type, as follows:

A:	Hauled passenger carriages
B:	Bogie Steel wagons (excluding coil-carrying wagons until 1984)
C:	Covered bulk wagons (except CA: goods brake vans)
D:	Diesel Multiple Unit carriages
E:	Electric Multiple Unit carriages
F:	Flat wagons
G:	High Speed Train carriages
H:	Hopper wagons
I:	Ferry wagons (International wagons)
J:	Private owner bogie wagons (bogie steel coil wagons until 1984)
K:	Private owner special wagons (2-axle steel coil wagons until 1984)
L:	Advanced Passenger Train carriages (includes Eurostar and Siemens Velaro)
M:	Mineral wagons
N:	Hauled non-passenger carriages
O:	Open wagons
P:	Private owner 2-axle wagons (originally all private owner wagons)
Q:	Hauled departmental (non-revenue) carriages
R:	Railway operating vehicles: Barrier wagons, Adaptor wagons, Runners and Diesel Brake Tenders
S:	2-axle steel wagons (excluding coil-carrying wagons until 1984)
T:	Tank wagons
U:	International hauled coaching stock (Uncovered bulk wagons until 1984)
V:	Vans
W:	Flat wagons
X:	Unused (Exceptional and Special use wagons until 1984)
Y:	Departmental bogie wagons
Z:	Departmental two-axle vehicle (carriage or wagon)

The second letter gave more detailed information, different for each series. The tables below list the variations for carriages:

A Series
AA:	Corridor
AB:	Brake Corridor
AC:	Open (2+2 seating)
AD:	Open (2+1 seating)
AE:	Brake Open
AF:	Driving Brake Open
AG:	Micro-Buffet
AH:	Kitchen Buffet
AI:	Open (2+2 seating) - end of Mark IV rake
AJ:	Restaurant Buffet
AK:	Kitchen
AL:	Open (2+2 seating) - with disabled persons' toilet
AM:	Restaurant
AN:	Miniature Buffet
AO:	Private Owner
AP:	Pullman Kitchen
AQ:	Pullman Saloon
AR:	Pullman Brake
AS:	Sleeping
AT:	Royal Train
AU:	Sleeping (with pantry)
AV-AY:	Barrier vehicles
AX:	Generator Van (Until 1987: Narrow gauge)
AY:	(Until 1987: Narrow gauge Brake)
AZ:	Special saloon

D and E Series
xA:	Driving Motor
xB:	Driving Motor Brake
xC:	Non-driving Motor
xD:	Non-driving Motor Brake
xE:	Driving Trailer
xF:	Battery Driving Trailer
xG:	Driving Trailer Brake
xH:	Trailer
xI:	Battery Driving Motor
xJ:	Trailer Brake
xN:	Trailer Buffet
xO:	Battery Driving Trailer Brake
xP:	Driving Motor (Diesel Mechanical Multiple Unit only)
xQ:	Driving Motor Brake (Diesel Mechanical Multiple Unit only)
xR:	Non-driving Motor (Diesel Mechanical Multiple Unit only)
xS:	Driving Trailer (Diesel Mechanical Multiple Unit only)
xT:	Trailer (Diesel Mechanical Multiple Unit only)
xU:	Trailer Brake (Diesel Mechanical Multiple Unit only)
xX:	Non-passenger Driving Motor and single-car passenger DMMUs
xY:	Non-Passenger Non-driving Motor
xZ:	Departmental stock

G and L Series
xC:	Motor
xE:	Driving Trailer
xF:	Barrier Vehicle
xH:	Trailer
xJ:	Trailer with Guard's compartment
xK:	Trailer Kitchen with Buffet
xL:	Trailer Kitchen
xM:	Trailer Kitchen with Lounge
xN:	Trailer Buffet

N Series
NA-NI:	Gangwayed Brake vans
NF:	Brake van (non-gangwayed)
NG:	Car-carrying flat wagon
NJ-NK:	General Utility van
NL-NM:	Newspaper van
NN:	Courier vehicle
NO-NQ:	Parcels van
NR:	Container van
NS:	Post Office Sorting van
NT:	Post Office Stowage van
NU:	Post Office Stowage Brake van
NV:	Car-carrying van
NW:	Bullion van
NX:	Motorail van
NY:	Exhibition van
NZ:	Driving Van Trailer

Q, Y and Z Series
xA-xC:	Ballast and sleeper wagons
xD:	General materials wagon
xE:	Runner wagon
xF:	Ballast hopper wagon
xG:	General materials wagon
xH:	Spoil wagon
xI:	Crane
xJ:	Tracklayer
xK-xM:	Ballast wagon
xN:	Steel wagon
xO:	Crane (travelling)
xP:	Staff or dormitory vehicle
xQ:	Tool vehicle
xR:	Stores or materials vehicle
xS:	Operating vehicle (e.g. barrier, generator)
xT:	Brake van
xU:	Brake van plough
xV:	General equipment vehicle (e.g. flat wagon)
xW:	On-track plant, saloon or self-propelled vehicle
xX:	Specialist equipment vehicle
xY:	Electrification equipment vehicle
xZ:	Miscellaneous vehicle (e.g. snowplough, unpowered former locomotive)

Apart from hauled passenger carriages ('A' series), the final letter indicated the braking arrangements. Nowadays almost all stock is air-braked, but when TOPS was introduced there was much greater variety, which made marshalling trains more complicated and this information essential. The letters were:

A:	Air brake only
B:	Air brake plus through vacuum pipe
D:	Electronic control
E:	Electro-pneumatic brake
F:	Vacuum brake (AFI equipment) [AFI: Accelerator Freight Inshot - a rapid-acting vacuum brake]
G:	Vacuum brake plus through air pipe (AFI equipment)
H:	Dual brake (AFI equipment)
O:	Unfitted (handbrake only)
P:	Unfitted with through vacuum pipe
Q:	Unfitted with through air pipe
R:	Unfitted with through air and vacuum pipes
V:	Vacuum brake only
W:	Vacuum brake plus through air pipe
X:	Dual brake (air and vacuum)
Y:	Unfitted (Civil Engineer's self-propelled stock)
Z:	Automatic brake of unknown working order

For hauled passenger carriages ('A' series), the suffix denoting the braking arrangements was replaced by two characters as follows:

- An additional digit denoted the class of passenger accommodation:

1:	First
2:	Second (later standard)
3:	Composite
4:	Unclassified
5:	None

- The final suffix indicated the build of the coach:

0:	Pre-Nationalisation design
1:	Mark 1
Z:	Mark 2
A:	Mark 2a
B:	Mark 2b
C:	Mark 2c
D:	Mark 2d
E:	Mark 2e
F:	Mark 2f
G:	Mark 3 or 3a
H:	Mark 3b
J:	Mark 4

This resulted in a 4 character alphanumeric TOPS classification, such as AB21 representing a Mark 1 Brake Corridor Second (BSK).

== See also ==
- Coaches of the London, Midland and Scottish Railway
