= British Rail departmental locomotives =

Specifications
- Track gauge: 4 ft 8 1/2 in (1,435 mm) standard gauge

Before the TOPS Class 97 was issued to self-propelled locomotives in departmental (non-revenue earning) use, British Rail had such locomotives numbered in a variety of series, together with locomotives that were no longer self-propelled.

Key:	In use	Withdrawn	Preserved	Renumbered	Returned to normal traffic	Scrapped

== Southern Region series ==
SR departmental locomotives are the locomotives of departmental (non-revenue earning) stock originally introduced by the Southern Railway. Both departmental locomotives and carriages were numbered in a series commencing at 1S. The series was retained by the Southern Region of British Rail, but amended so that the numbers carried a 'DS' prefix instead of an 'S' suffix.

This page lists the locomotives numbered in this series, including steam, diesel and electric locomotives.

Key:	In use	Withdrawn	Preserved	Renumbered	Returned to normal traffic	Scrapped

Number	Previous number(s)	Previous class	Converted	Use	Withdrawn	Disposal
DS49	49S	-	New (1940)	Diesel shunter, Exmouth Junction	1959	Scrapped
DS74	74S	-	New (1899)	Electric shunter, Durnsford Rd power station	1965	Scrapped (1965)
DS75	75S	-	New (1898)	Electric shunter, Waterloo & City line	1968	Preserved at National Railway Museum
DS77	E0745 / 77S	C14	1927	Steam shunter, Redbridge sleeper works	1959	Scrapped (1959)
DS209	-	-	New (1966)	Diesel shunter, by Secmafer of France	1968	Returned to Secmafer
-	A313 / 225S	?	1925	Steam shunter, Meldon Quarry	1939	Scrapped (1939)
DS233	30061	USA	1962	Steam shunter, Redbridge sleeper works	1967	Scrapped (1967)
-	A302 / 234S	-	1925	Steam crane tank, Lancing Works	1938	To capital stock - 1302 (Scrapped 1949)
DS234	30062	USA	1962	Steam shunter, Meldon Quarry	1967	Scrapped (1968)
-	A409 / 235S	-	1925	Steam crane tank, Ashford Works	1935	Scrapped (1935)
DS235	30066	USA	1963	Steam shunter, Lancing Works	1965	Scrapped (1965)
-	A353 / 236S	?	1925	Steam shunter, Ashford Works	1929	Scrapped (1932)
DS236	30074	USA	1963	Steam shunter, Lancing Works	1965	Scrapped (1965)
DS237	30065	USA	1963	Steam shunter, Ashford Works, named Maunsell	1967	Preserved
DS238	30070	USA	1963	Steam shunter, Ashford Works, named Wainwright	1967	Preserved
DS239	31592	C	1963	Steam shunter, Ashford Works	1966	Preserved
DS240	31271	C	1963	Steam shunter, Ashford Works	1966	Scrapped (1967)
DS343	343S	-	New (1930)	Diesel shunter, Eastleigh Works	1952	Scrapped
DS346	346S	-	New (1915)	Drewry Inspection Saloon	1949	Scrapped
DS377	2635 / 377S	A1X	1946	Steam shunter, Brighton Works	1959	Transferred to capital stock - 32635
-	B682 / 380S	A1	1932	Steam shunter, Brighton Works	1946	Preserved
DS400	400S	-	New (1946)	Diesel shunter, Southampton Docks	1957	Scrapped
DS499	499S	-	New (1935)	Diesel shunter, Lancing Works	1965	Scrapped
DS500	1607 / 500S	T	1938	Steam shunter, Meldon Quarry	1949	Scrapped (1950)
DS515	B650 / 515S	A1X	1937	Steam shunter, Lancing Works	1953	Transferred to capital stock - 32650
DS600	600S	-	New (1947)	Diesel shunter, Eastleigh depot	1963	Scrapped (1969)
DS680	A751 / 680S	A1	1932	Steam shunter, Lancing Works	1962	Preserved
DS681	32659	A1X	1953	Steam shunter, Lancing Works	1963	Scrapped (1963)
DS682	30238	G6	1960	Steam shunter, Meldon Quarry	1962	Scrapped (1963)
DS700	2244 / 700S	D1	1947	Oil pumping locomotive (steam), Eastleigh	1949	Scrapped (1949)
DS701	2284 / 701S	D1	1947	Oil pumping locomotive (steam), Fratton	1951	Scrapped (1951)
DS1169	-	-	New (1948)	Diesel shunter, named Little Eva	1972	Scrapped (1973) Preserved North Dorset Railway
DS1173	-	04	New (1948)	Diesel shunter, Hither Green depot	1967	Transferred to capital stock - D2341
DS3152	30272	G6	1950	Steam shunter, Meldon Quarry	1960	Scrapped (1960)
DS3191	30612	A12	1946	Steam supply, Eastleigh Works	1951	Scrapped (1951)

== Eastern Region series ==
In 1952, the Eastern Region of British Railways introduced its own series for departmental (non-revenue earning) vehicles, including locomotives. Numbers were allocated from 1 to 1000, with blocks of 100 numbers allocated to specific types of vehicle. This page only lists the locomotives (steam, diesel and electric), which took the number 1 to 100. This block was split as follows:

- 1-30 : Great Northern section (maintained at Doncaster)
- 31-50 : Great Eastern section (maintained at Stratford)
- 51-100: North Eastern section (maintained at Darlington)

The Great Northern list later expanded to take numbers 31 and 32 from the Great Eastern list. Also included on this page is a former diesel locomotive that had been converted as a mobile power unit and numbered in the 9xx block used for miscellaneous vehicles.

Key:	In use	Withdrawn	Preserved	Renumbered	Returned to normal traffic	Scrapped

=== Great Northern section ===
Number	Previous Number(s)	Previous Class	Converted	Use	Withdrawn	Disposal
1	68845	J52	1952	Steam shunter	1958	Scrapped (1958)
2 (1st)	68816	J52	1952	Steam shunter	1956	Scrapped (1956)
2 (2nd)	68858	J52	1956	Steam shunter	1961	Scrapped (1961)
3	68181	Y3	1952	Steam shunter	1959	Scrapped (1959)
4	68132	Y1	1952	Steam shunter	1959	Scrapped (1959)
5	68165	Y3	1953	Steam shunter	1958	Scrapped (1958)
6	68133	Y1	1953	Steam shunter	1955	Scrapped (1955)
7	68166	Y3	1953	Steam shunter	1964	Scrapped (1964)
8	68183	Y3	1955	Steam shunter	1959	Scrapped (1959)
9	68840	J52	1958	Steam shunter	1961	Scrapped (1961)
10	68911	J50	1961	Steam shunter	1965	Scrapped (1965)
11	68914	J50	1961	Steam shunter	1965	Scrapped (1965)
12	68917	J50	1962	Steam shunter	1965	Scrapped (1965)
13	68928	J50	1962	Steam shunter	1965	Scrapped (1965)
14	68961	J50	1962	Steam shunter	1965	Scrapped (1965)
15	68971	J50	1962	Steam shunter	1965	Scrapped (1965)
16	68976	J50	1962	Steam shunter	1965	Scrapped (1965)
17	61059	B1	1963	Stationary boiler for carriage warming	1966	Scrapped (1966)
18	61181	B1	1963	Stationary boiler for carriage warming	1965	Scrapped (1966)
19	61204	B1	1963	Stationary boiler for carriage warming	1966	Scrapped (1966)
20	61205	B1	1963	Stationary boiler for carriage warming	1965	Scrapped (1966)
21 (1st)	68162	Y3	1956	Steam shunter	1960	Scrapped (1960)
21 (2nd)	61233	B1	1963	Stationary boiler for carriage warming	1966	Scrapped (1966)
22	61252	B1	1963	Stationary boiler for carriage warming	1964	Scrapped (1966)
23	61300	B1	1963	Stationary boiler for carriage warming	1965	Scrapped (1966)
24 (1st)	61323	B1	1963	Stationary boiler for carriage warming	1963	Scrapped (1964)
24 (2nd)	61375	B1	1963	Stationary boiler for carriage warming	1966	Scrapped (1966)
25	61272	B1	1965	Stationary boiler for carriage warming	1966	Scrapped (1966)
26	61138	B1	1965	Stationary boiler for carriage warming	1967	Scrapped (1968)
27	61105	B1	1965	Stationary boiler for carriage warming	1966	Scrapped (1966)
28	61194	B1	1965	Stationary boiler for carriage warming	1966	Scrapped (1966)
29	61264	B1	1965	Stationary boiler for carriage warming	1967	Preserved
30	61050	B1	1966	Stationary boiler for carriage warming	1968	Scrapped (1968)
31 (2nd)	61051	B1	1966	Stationary boiler for carriage warming	1966	Scrapped (1966)
32 (2nd)	61315	B1	1966	Stationary boiler for carriage warming	1968	Scrapped (1968)

=== Great Eastern section ===
Number	Previous Number(s)	Previous Class	Converted	Use	Withdrawn	Disposal
31 (1st)	68383	J66	1952	Steam shunter	1959	Scrapped (1959)
32 (1st)	68370	J66	1952	Steam shunter	1962	Scrapped (1962)
33	68129	Y4	1952	Steam shunter	1963	Scrapped (1964)
34	68088	Y7	1952	Steam shunter	1952	Preserved
35	68668	J92	1952	Steam crane tank	1952	Scrapped (1952)
36	68378	J66	1952	Steam shunter	1959	Scrapped (1959)
37	68130	Y1	1953	Steam shunter	1956	Scrapped (1956)
38	68168	Y3	1953	Steam shunter	1959	Scrapped (1959)
39	68131	Y1	1953	Steam shunter	1963	Scrapped (1963)
40	68173	Y3	1953	Steam shunter	1964	Scrapped (1964)
41	68177	Y3	1953	Steam shunter	1963	Scrapped (1963)
42	68178	Y3	1953	Steam shunter	1960	Scrapped (1960)
43	68532	J69	1959	Steam shunter	1959	Scrapped (1959)
44	68498	J69	1959	Steam shunter	1962	Scrapped (1962)
45	68543	J69	1959	Steam shunter	1962	Scrapped (1962)

=== North Eastern section ===
Number	Previous Number(s)	Previous Class	Converted	Use	Withdrawn	Disposal
51	68136	Y1	1952	Steam shunter	1956	Scrapped (1956)
52	11104	-	1953	Diesel shunter, West Hartlepool	1967	Scrapped (1967)
53	68152	Y1	1954	Steam shunter	1959	Scrapped (1959)
54	68153	Y1	1954	Steam shunter	1961	Preserved
55	68091	Y8	1954	Steam shunter	1956	Scrapped (1956)
56	-	-	New (1955)	Diesel shunter, Hull	1970	Scrapped (1980)
57	68160	Y3	1956	Steam shunter	1961	Scrapped (1961)
58	69005	J72	1964	Steam shunter	1967	Scrapped (1968)
59	69023	J72	1964	Steam shunter	1966	Preserved
81	-	01	New (1958)	Diesel shunter, Peterborough	1967	Transferred capital stock - D2956
82	-	-	New (1958)	Diesel shunters	1970	Scrapped (1980)
83	-	-	New (1958)	Diesel shunters	1970	Scrapped (1970)
84	-	-	New (1958)	Diesel shunters	1970	Scrapped (1970)
85	-	-	New (1961)	Diesel shunters	1970	Scrapped (1970)
86	-	-	New (1961)	Diesel shunters	1970	Scrapped (1970)
87	-	-	New (1961)	Diesel shunters	1970	Scrapped (1970)
88	D2612	05	1961	Diesel shunter	1967	Scrapped (1967)
89	D2615	05	1964	Diesel shunter	1967	Returned to capital stock
91	-	03	New (1958)	Diesel shunters, Chesterton	1967	Transferred to capital stock - D2370
92	-	03	New (1958)	Diesel shunters, Chesterton	1967	Transferred to capital stock - D2371
100	26510	EB1	1959	Electric shunting locomotive, Ilford depot	1963	Scrapped (1964)

=== Miscellaneous stock ===
Number	Previous Number(s)	Previous Class	Converted	Use	Withdrawn	Disposal
953	7055 / MPU2	Ex-LMS	1952	Mobile power generating unit	1964	Scrapped (1964)

== Western Region series ==
The Great Western Railway purchased two diesel shunters during its existence, which were numbered 1 and 2. Number 1 was effectively a departmental locomotive, while 2 was in capital stock. Details of both locomotives may be found here.

The GWR also owned a number of small petrol shunters built by Motor Rail, which carried numbers 15 and 22-27 in their departmental number series. These survived to be taken over by British Rail, which did not renumber them. These shunters are listed below.

The Western Region of British Rail used a PWM (Permanent Way Machinery) series which incorporated some locomotives. The two narrow gauge GWR petrol shunters were allocated numbers in this series, as were the five shunters PWM650-PWM654, which were later renumbered as 97650-97654.

Number	Builder Details	Use	Withdrawn	Disposal
15	Motor Rail, 1923	Shunter	1951	Scrapped (1951)
22	Motor Rail, 1930	Shunter, 2 ft (610 mm) gauge, allocated PWM1780	1952	Scrapped (1952)
23	Motor Rail, 1925	Shunter	1960	Scrapped (1960)
24	Motor Rail, 1926	Shunter	1960	Scrapped (1960)
25	Motor Rail, 1930	Shunter, 2 ft (610 mm) gauge, allocated PWM1779	1951	Scrapped (1951)
26	Motor Rail, 1927	Shunter	1960	Scrapped (1960)
27	Motor Rail, 1926	Shunter	1960	Scrapped (1960)

== Engineering Department series ==
The London Midland Region Engineering Department numbered its diesel locomotives in a series running from ED1 upwards (though ED8 and ED9 were never allocated).

Number	Former No.	Builder Details	Use	Withdrawn	Disposal
ED1	Ex-LMS 2	Fowler, 1935	Shunter at Beeston sleeper works	1962	Scrapped (1962)
ED2	-	Fowler, 1949	Shunter	1965	Scrapped (1967)
ED3	-	Fowler, 1949	Shunter	1967	Scrapped (1968)
ED4	-	Fowler, 1949	Shunter	1964	Scrapped (1967)
ED5	-	Fowler, 1949	Shunter	1965	Scrapped (1967)
ED6	-	Fowler, 1949	Shunter	1967	Scrapped (1968)
ED7	-	Fowler, 1940	Shunter (purchased in 1955)	1964	Scrapped (1964)
ED10	-	Ruston & Hornsby, 1958	0-4-0 Shunter at Beeston sleeper works	1965	Preserved on Irchester Narrow Gauge Railway

== 966xxx and 968xxx series ==
The 968xxx series (in the carriage and wagon number series) was used for departmental locomotives from 1968 onwards. Previously, some former Class 08 shunters that were converted to snowploughs had been numbered in the 966xxx series, but this was discontinued and some of these locomotives were renumbered into the 968xxx series.

When the Class 97 series for self-propelled locomotives was introduced, some locomotives in this series were renumbered to Class 97, leaving the 968xxx numbers just for locomotives that were no longer self-propelled. Since privatisation, other numbering schemes have been used for locomotives used for a similar-purpose as those in the 968xxx series. For completion these locomotives are also included. Details of all locomotives are shown below:

Number	Previous Number(s)	Previous Class	Converted	Use	Withdrawn	Disposal
ADB 966506	13078 / D3078	08	1973	Snowplough	1978	Scrapped 1979
ADB 966507	13006 / D3006	08	-	Snowplough	1979	Scrapped 1979
ADB 966508	13035 / D3035	08	1974	Snowplough	1979	Scrapped 1979
ADB 966509	13069 / D3069	08	1974	Snowplough	1979	Scrapped 1980
ADB 966510	13037 / D3037	08	1974	Snowplough	1978	Scrapped 1979
ADB 966511	13186 / D3186 / 08119	08	1977	Snowplough	1977	Renumbered to ADB 968011
ADB 966512	13177 / D3177 / 08111	08	1977	Snowplough	1977	Renumbered to ADB 968012
ADB 966513	13184 / D3184 / 08117	08	1977	Snowplough	1977	Renumbered to ADB 968010
ADB 966514	E3044 / 84009	84	1978	Mobile load bank	1978	Renumbered to ADB 968021
ADB 968000	D8243	15	1968	Coaching-stock Pre-heating Unit	1981	Scrapped 1991
ADB 968001	D8233	15	1968	Coaching-stock pre-heating unit	1982	Preserved at East Lancs Railway
ADB 968002	D8237	15	1968	Coaching-stock pre-heating unit	1982	Scrapped 1982
ADB 968003	D8203	15	1968	Coaching-stock pre-heating unit	1981	Scrapped 1981
ADB 968004	7055 / MPU2 / 953	Ex-LMS	-	Mobile power generating unit	-	Written off (1975)
TDB 968005	D7089	35	1975	Coaching-stock pre-heating unit	1975	Scrapped 1976
TDB 968006	D5705 / 15705	28	1968	Coaching-stock pre-heating unit	1977	Preserved on East Lancashire Railway
RDB 968007	D5061 / 24061	24	1975	Research-department use	1978	Renumbered to 97201
TDB 968008	D5054 / 24054	24	1976	Coaching-stock pre-heating unit	1982	Preserved on East Lancashire Railway
TDB 968009	D5142 / 24142	24	1976	Coaching-stock pre-heating unit	1982	Scrapped 1984
ADB 968010	13184 / D3184 / 08117 / ADB 966513	08	1977	Snowplough	1979	Scrapped 1979
ADB 968011	13186 / D3186 / 08119 / ADB 966511	08	1977	Snowplough	1979	Scrapped 1980
ADB 968012	13177 / D3177 / 08111 / ADB 966512	08	1977	Snowplough	1979	Scrapped 1979
ADB 968013	D5513 / 31013	31	1979	Coaching-stock pre-heating unit	1983	Scrapped 1983
ADB 968014	D5502 / 31002	31	1980	Coaching-stock pre-heating unit	1982	Scrapped 1984
ADB 968015	D5514 / 31014	31	1977	Coaching-stock pre-heating unit	1982	Scrapped 1983
ADB 968016	D5508 / 31008	31	1981	Coaching-stock pre-heating unit	1982	Scrapped 1985
ADB 968017	13061 / D3061 / 08048	08	Cancelled	Snowplough	-	Scrapped 1978
ADB 968018	13080 / D3080 / 08065	08	Cancelled	Snowplough	-	Scrapped 1978
ADB 968019	13081 / D3081 / 08066	08	Cancelled	Snowplough	-	Scrapped 1978
RDB 968020	13337 / D3337 / 08267	08	1978	Research-department use	1979	Renumbered to 97801
ADB 968021	E3044 / 84009 / ADB 966514	84	1978	Mobile load bank	1995	Scrapped 1995
ADB 968022	E3038 / 84003	84	Cancelled	Mobile load bank	-	Scrapped 1986
ADB 968023	E3032 / 83009	83	1983	Static transformer	1985	Returned to normal traffic - later scrapped
ADB 968024	D23 / 45017	45	1985	Static training locomotive	1988	Scrapped 1991
ADB 968025	D5404 / 27113 / 27207	27	1986	Static training locomotive	1987	Scrapped 1988
ADB 968026	D7657 / 25307 / 25908	25	1986	Static training locomotive	1988	Scrapped 1988
ADB 968027	D7672 / 25322 / 25912	25	1987	Static training locomotive	1989	Returned to normal traffic - later preserved
ADB 968028	D5374 / 27024	27	1989	Static training locomotive	1989	Preserved on Caledonian Railway (Brechin)
ADB 968029 (number never carried)	D8001 / 20001	20	1989	Static training locomotive	1992	Preserved at Midland Railway - Butterley
TDB 968030	D6530 / 33018	33	1988	Static training locomotive	2000	Preserved at Midland Railway - Butterley
ADB 968031	D411 / 50011	50	1987	Power unit transporter	1992	Scrapped 1992
ADB 968032	D8011 / 20011	20	1988	Power unit transporter	1992	Scrapped 1994
ADB 968033	D1502 / 47403	47	1988	Static training locomotive	1992	Scrapped 1994
ADB 968034 (number never carried)	D3937 / 08769	08	1989	Static training locomotive	1999	Preserved on Dean Forest Railway
ADB 968035	D1669 / 47538	47	1993	Power unit transporter	1996	Scrapped 1997

== Internal User series ==
Internal User vehicles are those that are not allowed to run on the mainline, but are only for use within depot complexes. They are often stationary, though not always. Two former locomotives that were heavily stripped, leaving just the frames, to carry power units within Toton depot were allocated IU numbers.

Number	Previous Number(s)	Previous Class	Converted	Use	Withdrawn	Disposal
025031	D6770 / 37070	37	1995	Power unit transporter	1995	Scrapped 2004
025032	D6838 / 37138	37	1995	Power unit transporter	1995	Scrapped 2004

== Miscellaneous locomotives ==
Brush Traction, Loughborough were using a British Rail Class 56 locomotive, 56009 in their works as a power unit transporter and test bed for a Class 56 overhaul programme. It was not registered on the TOPS system, but Brush had given it the painted TOPS-like number 56201. This programme was abandoned, leaving the loco in extended storage for over 16 years. It since been sold to UKRL leasing and remains stored at Shackerstone with plans to overhaul it as part of their re-engineering programme.

A heavily stripped Class 73 locomotive, 73126 was used as a static training locomotive at the Fire Service College in Moreton-in-Marsh, replacing the previously used locomotives TDB 968030 (33018, preserved and now under restoration at a private site near Mangapps Farm in Essex) and ADB 968034 (08769, preserved at Severn Valley Railway). Since this locomotive was converted after privatisation it was not renumbered into the 968xxx series. Bought by Cotswold Rail's Adrian Parcell and later sold to the college, the locomotive was little more than a shell after 4 years as a spares donor at Stewart's Lane and Old Oak Common, and after 9 years was sold for scrap at Booth Roe Metals, Rotherham in August 2009.

Number	Previous Number	Previous Class	Converted	Use	Withdrawn	Disposal
56201	56009	56	1996	Power unit transporter/test bed	1996	Owned by UK Rail Leasing and stored at the Battlefield Line pending overhaul.
73126	E6033	73	2000	Static training locomotive	1999	Sold to CF Booth Rotherham and scrapped in August 2009

== Sources ==
- Boddy, M. G.; Fry, E. V.; Hennigan, W.; Hoole, Ken; Yeadon, W. B. (November 1988). Fry, E. V. (ed.). Locomotives of the L.N.E.R., part 10A: Departmental Stock, Locomotive Sheds, Boiler and Tender Numbering. Lincoln: RCTS. pp. 14–27. ISBN 0-901115-65-7.
