= William Robert Renshaw =

English industrialist and foundryman (1845–1923)

William Robert Renshaw (1845 – 1923) was an English industrialist and foundryman.

Renshaw was born to an agricultural family in Handforth in the county of Cheshire, England. He began his career as an apprentice button-maker at the Union Foundry of Barker and Cope in Kidsgrove, Staffordshire.

In 1880 he was in business with his own foundry, the Victoria Works in Tunstall, Staffordshire, where he produced equipment for collieries, forges and mills, before returning to Kidsgrove to acquire the Union Foundry as a member of a partnership known as Renshaw, King and Company.

He later moved to the Phoenix Works at Cliffe Vale, where electrical and railway equipment was manufactured and where specialist railway carriages and wagons were built for use by the Barnum & Bailey Circus, (see Phineas Taylor Barnum) during its tour of Britain and Europe which began in 1886.

Among other children and grandchildren he had two grandsons worthy of note, namely George and John Starr, both of whom were members of the Special Operations Executive organisation during World War II.

== Industrial sites ==
- Coleham Pumping Station Shrewsbury
