= Barnabas Community Church, Shrewsbury =

Coordinates: 52°42′18″N 2°44′47″W

Barnabas Community Church
- Shown within Shropshire
- OS grid reference: SJ 49664 12171
- Location: Shrewsbury, SY3
- Country: England
- Denomination: Newfrontiers(Since 1996;) Evangelical
- Previous denomination: Baptist (pre-1983); non-denominational (1983-96)
- Website: barnabascommunitychurch.com

History
- Founded: 1983; 27 years ago

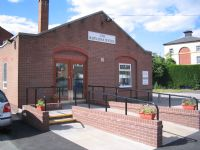
The Barnabas Church centre

Barnabas Community Church is an independent, charismatic evangelical, Church in Shrewsbury, England, associated with the British New Church Movement. It is part of the Newfrontiers family of churches and a member of the Evangelical Alliance. The congregation meets every Sunday at 10am at the Barnabas Centre, in Coleham.

== History ==
Barnabas Christian Fellowship was founded in 1983, after the Crowmoor Baptist Church outgrew its building at the time. The initial group was about 80 strong. Restricted by only having limited capacity in meeting rooms above a pub, as the church grew, it separated into two congregations for a three-year period. In 1993, the two congregations reunited and began meeting together at the Wakeman School, now part of the Shrewsbury Sixth Form College, with a clear sense that a new "home" was needed.

In 1996 Barnabas formally became part of Newfrontiers, an international family of similar churches, and in 1999 formally adopted a cell group model for church life - now referred to as Midweek Groups - having been inspired by other churches' usage.

About the same time the Alpha Course was adopted and has been run twice a year since then.

== The Barnabas Centre ==
Between 1983 and 1985 the church met in various public halls including the Music Hall, now the Shrewsbury Museum, and the Gateway arts centre. Between 1985 and 1996 the church rented a suite of rooms above the Lloyds pub in Shrewsbury town centre. In 1996 the church moved to the Longden Coleham Territorial Army Centre whose premises it expanded and now uses as a permanent base.

The Barnabas Centre within its premises is now a multi-use church centre with many community agencies using the facilities, such as an NHS pop-up Blood Donor clinic

There are also many community projects run from the sub charity 'Barnabas Community Projects.' These include a foodbank, a money advice centre and a '360 Journey to Work' programme. Also run by the Church in term-time every week is a toddler group, 'Barneytots;' a youth group, 'Impact,' and a children's (aged 5–11) after school club, 'Kidzklub.'
