= LMS diesel shunters 7055/6 =

LMS 7055–7056
Type and origin
- Power type: Diesel-mechanical
- Builder: Hudswell Clarke
- Build date: 1934
- Total produced: 2
Specifications
- Configuration
  - Whyte: 0-6-0DM
  - UIC: C
- Gauge: 4 ft 8 1/2 in (1,435 mm) standard gauge
- Wheel diameter: 3 ft 4 in (1.016 m)
- Wheelbase: 9 ft 0 in (2.74 m)
- Length: 26 ft 10.5 in (8.19 m)
- Width: 8 ft 7 in (2.62 m)
- Height: 12 ft 0 in (3.66 m)
- Loco weight: 30.5 long tons (31.0 t; 34.2 short tons)
- Fuel capacity: 100 imp gal (450 L; 120 US gal)
- Prime mover: Mirrlees-Ricardo
- Engine type: 8-cyl diesel
- Transmission: Bostock & Bramley
- Train heating: None
- Loco brake: Air
- Train brakes: None
Performance figures
- Maximum speed: 19 mph (31 km/h)
- Power output: 150 hp (112 kW)
- Tractive effort: Max: 11,950 lbf (53.2 kN)
Career
- Operators: London, Midland and Scottish Railway
- Numbers: LMS 7055–7056
- Withdrawn: See text
- Disposition: Both scrapped

LMS diesel shunters 7055/6 were built by Hudswell Clarke. They were initially allocated numbers 7405/7406 but these numbers were never carried. Testing started in August 1934. One locomotive was taken into LMS stock in December 1934 and the other in October 1935.

== Conversion ==
They were withdrawn from normal service in April/May 1939 and subsequently converted to mobile power units, emerging in their new guise as MPU2/MPU1 in May 1940/October 1940 respectively. MPU2 (7055) was later allocated to the Eastern Region of British Railways, where it was identified as number 953 in their departmental vehicle series.

== Scrapping ==
They were scrapped in February 1964/January 1956 respectively, though due to administrative errors, the disposal of 953 (7055) was not recorded and it was initially allocated number 968004 in the new departmental locomotive series introduced in 1968.

== See also ==
- LMS diesel shunters
