= Coleham Pumping Station =

Historical pumping station in Shrewsbury, England

Coordinates: 52.7044°N 2.7479°W

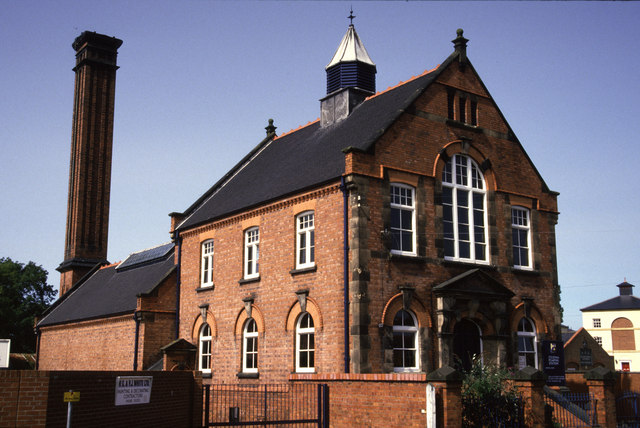
Coleham Pumping Station

Coleham Pumping Station is a historical pumping station at Coleham in Shrewsbury, England.

== History ==
The sewage pumping station was built at the end of the 19th century as part of a major upgrading of Shrewsbury's sewerage system. Two massive steam-driven beam engines were built by Renshaw's of Stoke-on-Trent during 1897–1898; and a brick building, resembling a Victorian chapel in style, was constructed in 1900 to house them. The pumping station was opened by the mayoress of Shrewsbury in 1901.

The steam-powered pumps were used until 1970, when new electric pumps were brought into use.

The ownership of the pumping station, including the building, engines and grounds, was transferred to Shrewsbury and Atcham Borough Council in 1974. It is now a museum run by Shropshire Museums (department of Shropshire Council).

== Preservation ==
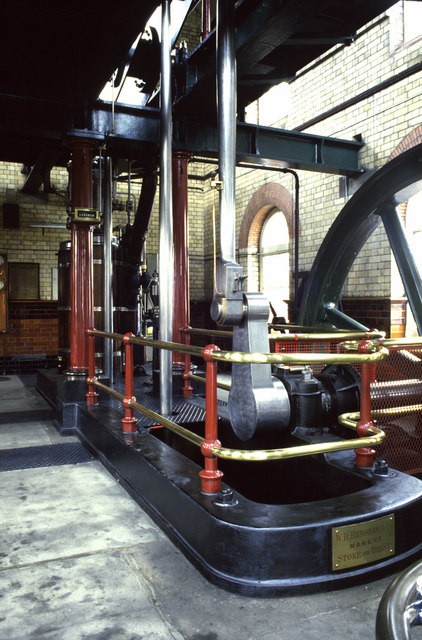

The Shrewsbury Steam Trust was founded in 1992 with the aim of restoring the steam engines and the two coal-fired Cornish boilers that provided the steam.

One boiler was commissioned in 2002, allowing the Society to hold 'steam-up' days.

Restoration of the second beam engine was completed on 27 September 2004, when it was operated for the first time in the 34 years since it was retired.

Both steam engines may be seen running together on the several Open Days that are held at the museum each year.
