= Longden Coleham drill hall =

- Shrewsbury
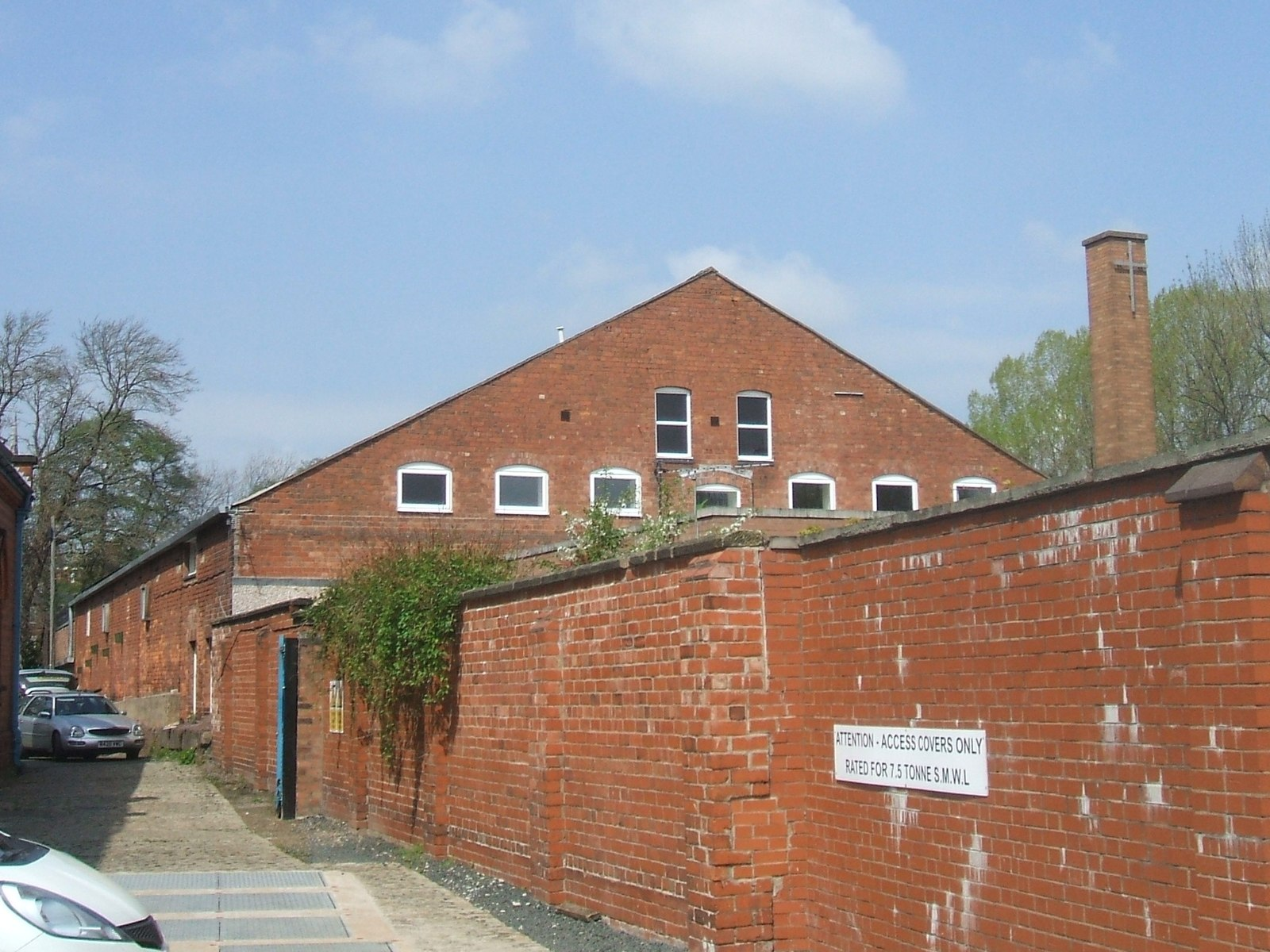
- Longden Coleham drill hall

Site information
- Type: Drill hall

Location
- Location within Shropshire
- Coordinates: 52.70480°N 2.74668°W

Site history
- Built: 1865
- Built for: War Office
- In use: 1865-1990s

The Longden Coleham drill hall is a former military installation in Shrewsbury, Shropshire.

== History ==
The building was designed for the Shropshire Rifle Volunteers and was completed around 1865. The unit evolved to become the 1st Volunteer Battalion, The King's Shropshire Light Infantry in 1883 and the 4th Battalion, The King's Shropshire Light Infantry in 1908. The battalion was mobilised at the drill hall in August 1914 before being deployed to India. A Squadron, Shropshire Yeomanry were also based at the drill hall at the time of the First World War.

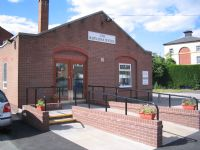
The buildings in their later role (2007) as The Barnabas Church centre

Following the cut-backs to the Territorial Army in 1967, 4th Battalion, The King's Shropshire Light Infantry evolved to become the 5th Battalion, The Light Infantry in 1972 and the 5th (Shropshire and Herefordshire) Battalion, The Light Infantry (Volunteers) in 1988. After the unit moved to the present Copthorne Road Army Reserve Centre in the early 1990s, the Longden Coleham drill hall was decommissioned and acquired by Barnabas Community Church.
