= Coleham =

District of Shrewsbury, Shropshire, England

Coordinates: 52°42′13″N 2°44′51″W

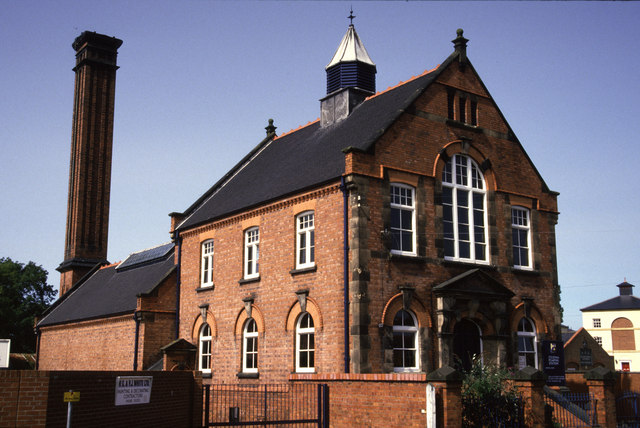
- Coleham Pumping Station

- Location within Shropshire
- OS grid reference: SJ493120
- Unitary authority: Shropshire
- Ceremonial county: Shropshire
- Region: West Midlands
- Country: England
- Sovereign state: United Kingdom
- Post town: Shrewsbury
- Postcode district: SY3
- Dialling code: 01743
- Police: West Mercia
- Fire: Shropshire
- Ambulance: West Midlands
- UK Parliament: Shrewsbury

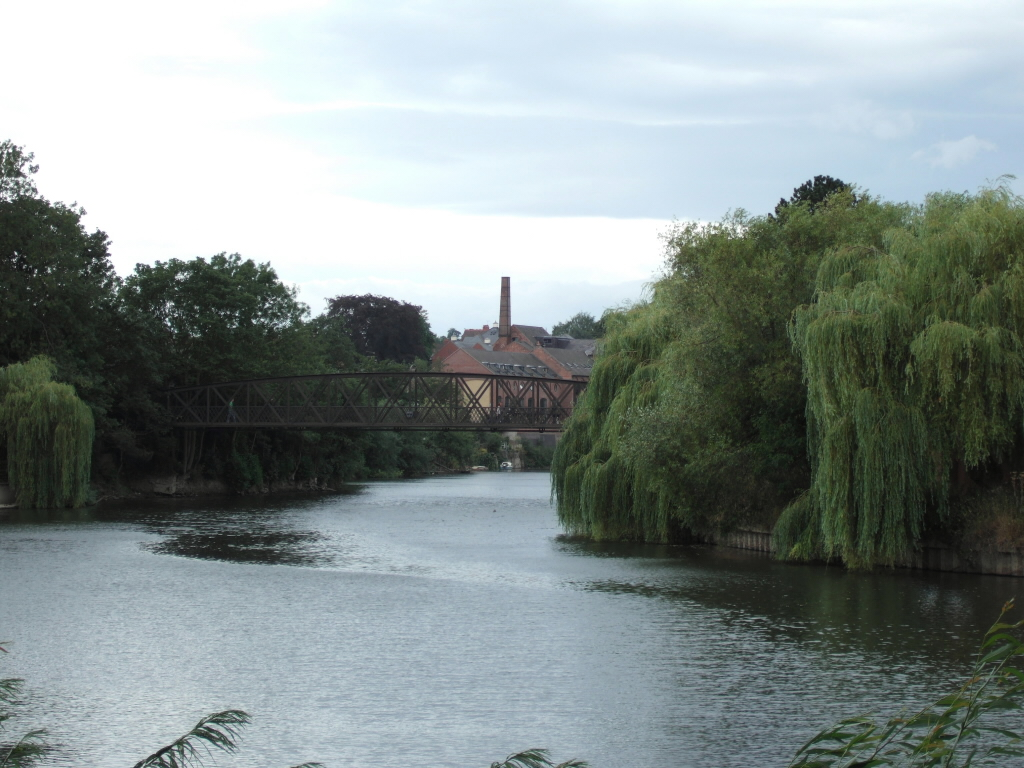
Greyfriars Bridge, linking Shrewsbury's town centre with Coleham

Coleham is a district of the town of Shrewsbury in Shropshire, England. It is located just south, over the River Severn, from Shrewsbury town centre.

== History ==
Coleham grew up as a village outside medieval Shrewsbury, with the nearest crossing over the Severn to the town being the Stone Bridge (now the English Bridge). Shrewsbury Abbey and its associated lands and buildings were nearby. The Rea Brook separates Coleham from the other old suburb on this end of town – Abbey Foregate. The area gave its name to an island that sat between two streams of the river, Coleham Island, now demolished.

Coleham is centered on the Shrewsbury to Longden road, which as it passes through Coleham itself is called "Longden Coleham". The Victorian suburb of Belle Vue grew up south of Coleham, and the wealthy suburb of Kingsland (which centres on Shrewsbury School) grew up west of Coleham.

The first large scale industrial building in Shrewsbury arose in Coleham when in 1790 the firm of Powis & Hodge built three factory buildings on land bought from John Carline at the junction of Longden Coleham and Coleham Head beside the Severn. A waterwheel and steam engine powered carding engines, spinning jennies and fulling facilities. The firm failed by 1799 but the buildings were sold in 1803 to Charles Hulbert and partners from Manchester for weaving cotton calicoes. It came to employ 200 people but it was given up after Hulbert, following reversals, left the cotton industry and handed the lease back to its lease-owner John Carline (Junior) in 1825. The buildings were converted by the Carlines into (now demolished) workers' cottages. In 1793 ironmaster William Hazledine purchased land at Coleham, where he set up a larger foundry with steam-powered equipment. The foundry eventually employed several hundred workers. In 1796 he cast the frame for the Ditherington Flax Mill designed by Charles Bage, the world's first iron-framed building.

The former Trouncer's Brewery was established in Coleham on the banks of the Severn in 1807: it closed in 1954 when acquired by Ind Coope. The brewery buildings are listed Grade II and have since been converted to private residences.

Today, Coleham is connected to the town centre by a pedestrian footbridge, the Greyfriars Bridge, though the nearest vehicular crossing remains the English Bridge. There are shops and public houses along Longden Coleham, as well as a primary school. The Coleham Pumping Station is a visitor destination and is located on Longden Coleham.

Greyfriars Bridge in Coleham is the starting point for Regional Cycle Route 32/33 to Church Stretton (and further on, Craven Arms).

The area suffered badly from flooding in 2000, which entirely took hold of Longden Coleham and other low-lying streets in the area. Since then a number of measures have been taken to alleviate flooding problems in the Coleham and Abbey Foregate areas.

== Barnabas Community Church ==
The Barnabas Community Church is located on Longden Coleham, where it converted and extended a former Territorial Army drill hall, acquired in 1995, for its use. The Barnabas Centre within its premises is now a multi-use church centre with many community agencies using the facilities, such as an NHS pop-up Blood Donor clinic

There are also many community projects run from the sub charity 'Barnabas Community Projects.' These include a foodbank, a money advice centre and a '360 Journey to Work' programme. Also run by the Church in term-time every week is a toddler group, 'Barneytots;' a youth group, 'Impact,' and a children's (aged 5–11) after school club, 'Kidzklub.'

== Railways ==
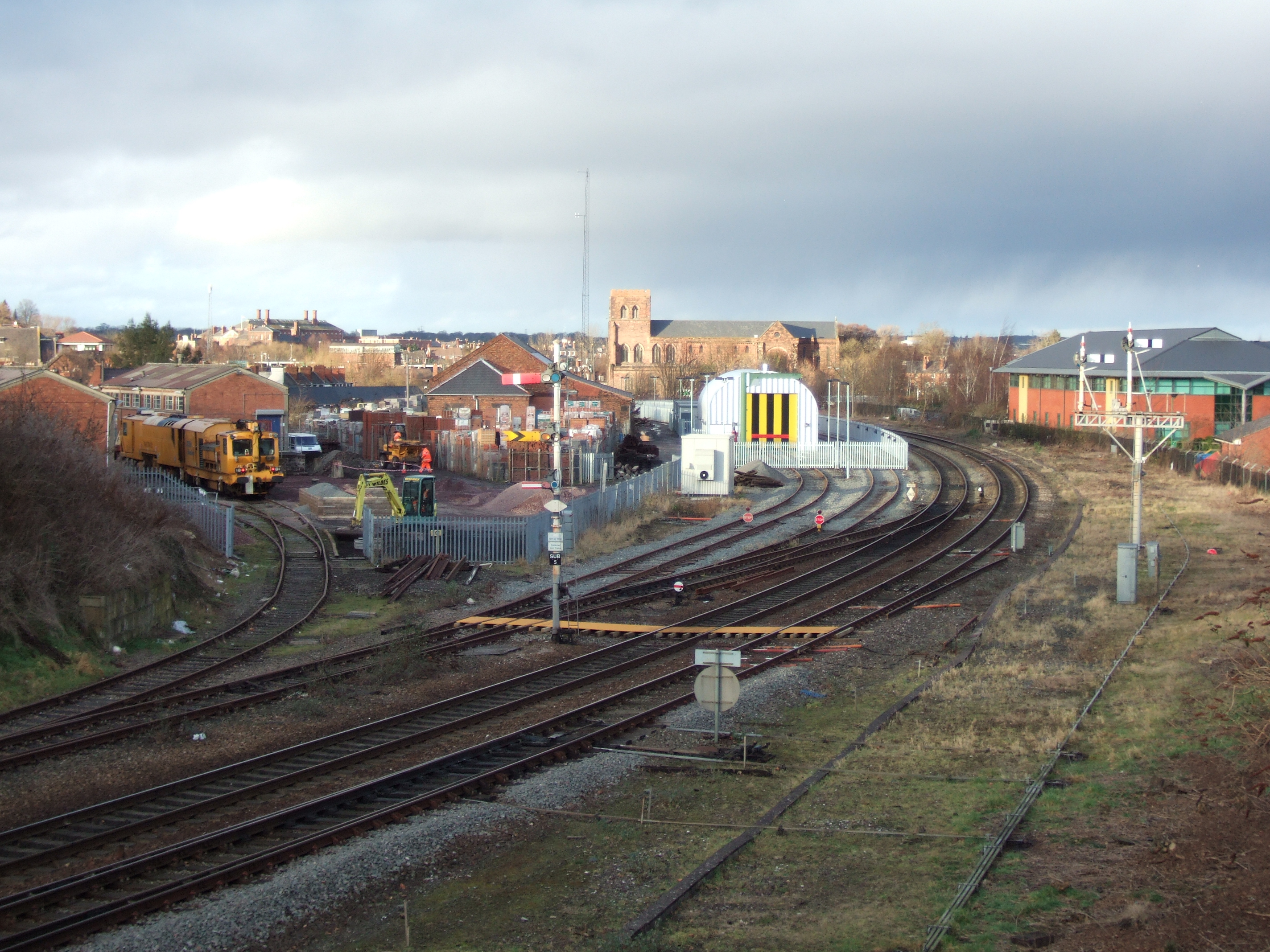
Looking north from Sutton Bridge Junction, Network Rail's Coleham Depot is on the left. To the right were once the extensive Coleham Sheds, which have now been completely demolished and the track lifted. Semaphore signaling remains in operation here.

The Welsh Marches Line (and Cambrian Line) runs through the area, partially on a long brick viaduct which crosses over the Abbey Foregate road, between Severn Bridge Junction and Sutton Bridge Junction. There were once extensive engine sheds and other railway related activities in the area. There remains a permanent way depot – Coleham Depot – and in 2008 a new inspection shed for the Class 97/3 locomotives was built.

== Notable people ==
- Charles Hulbert, later a writer, was a factory leaseholder in Coleham.
- Servant of God Mary Joseph Prout, founder of the Passionist Order of nuns, was born in Coleham in 1820.

== See also ==
- Cadfael
- Railways of Shropshire
- Pipemaking in Suburban Shrewsbury 1650-1912
