= British Rail Class 97 =

Designation for departmental locomotives

British Rail reserved the TOPS Class 97 designation for departmental locomotives, which were used for special or engineering duties. They were therefore of several different classes, lumped together for numbering purposes. Some locomotives were converted from redundant engines, whilst others were purpose built. In 2008, Network Rail once again used Class 97 for signalling test locomotives (Class 97/3).

== Allocation of numbers ==
Class 97 numbers were allocated in one of three ways:

- Application of 97 prefix to pre-TOPS number – e.g. Western Region shunters PWM 650–654 became 97650–97654.
- TOPS class number replaced by 97 prefix – e.g. Former Class 47 locomotive 47472 became 97472.
- Allocation of number in a series commencing from 97x01, where x represented the engine power Type (1 to 5), '7' for ex-multiple unit conversions and '8' for diesel shunters.

== Locomotive descriptions ==
=== 97020 ===
Built by Ruston & Hornsby in January 1957 with the serial number 408493, this 4wDM shunter was ordered specifically for departmental use by the Signalling & Telecommunications department of the Western region at Reading Signal Works. The transmission was diesel mechanical, although the wheels were chain driven from the gearbox and the loco was rated at 88 bhp (66 kW) for a weight of only 17 tons. Tractive effort was a maximum of 9,500 lbf (42,000 N). Delivered to the WR with the number 20 it was renumbered to 97020 in May 1980. However withdrawal came in April 1981 and it was scrapped on site in August 1982 by Cartwrights of Tipton. For refuelling, it had to go via the main line to the depot at Reading.

=== 97201 ===
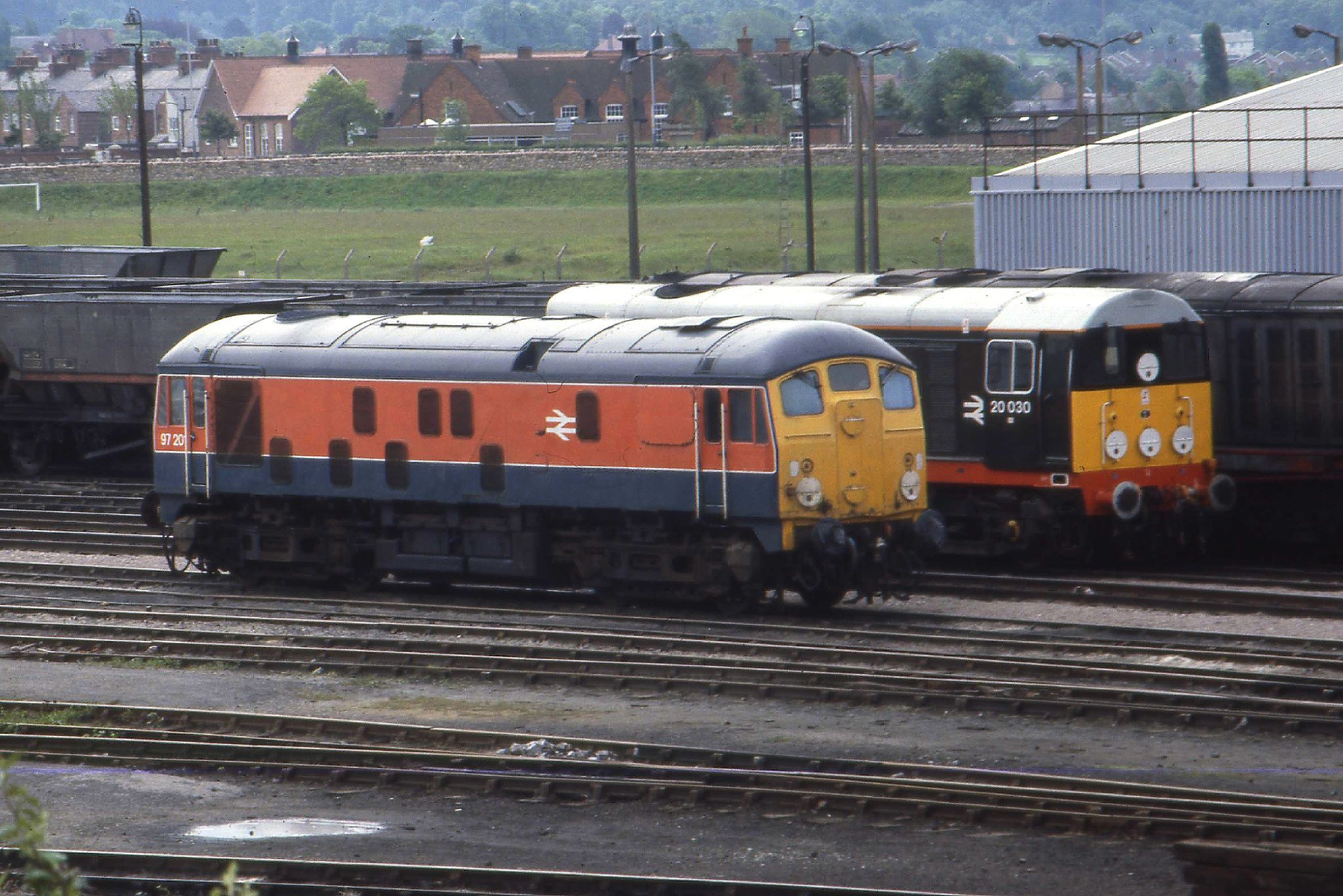
97201 at Worksop in BR Research Division livery

This locomotive was a former Class 24 locomotive No.24061, which was taken over by the Railway Technical Centre, based at Derby, in 1975. It was initially numbered RDB 968007, and was given its Class 97 number in 1979. It was employed hauling various test-trains until retirement in 1988. It was painted in RTC's distinctive red/blue livery, and named "Experiment". After withdrawal it was preserved on the Midland Railway Centre having been to Vic Berrys at Leicester for Asbestos Removal then later the East Lancs Railway before a spell at the North Tyneside Steam Railway before later moving to the North Yorkshire Moors Railway.

=== 97202 ===
This was former Class 25 locomotive 25131 used for training purposes at Toton depot. It had been withdrawn on 6 December 1982 and was reinstated as 97202 on 1 October 1983. It only lasted in Departmental service until January 1984 when it was again withdrawn, eventually being scrapped by Vic Berry.

Subsequently, other training locomotives were numbered in the ADB 968xxx series.

=== 97203–97204 ===
These locomotives were converted from Class 31 locomotives. The first, no. 97203, was operated by the Railway Technical Centre, based at Derby. It was used to haul various test-trains operated by the centre. However, in 1987, the locomotive was written off after having sustained fire damage. Therefore, a replacement in the form of 97204 was converted. This later returned to normal traffic, as no. 31970. Both locomotives were painted in RTC's red/cream livery with a black bodyside band.

=== 97205 ===
This was former Class 31 locomotive 31163, currently based at Chinnor & Princes Risborough Railway in Derby RTC livery.

=== 97250–97252 ===
Three former Class 25 locomotives were converted for use as mobile generators to provide electric heating on trains where the hauling locomotive could not supply this, including the Caledonian Sleeper. They were referred to as ETHEL units (Electric Train Heating Ex-Locomotives), and unofficially named Ethel 1, Ethel 2 and Ethel 3. They were painted in a blue/grey livery in an effort to match the coaching stock livery of the day, but this was not too successful. All three have since been scrapped.

=== 97301–97304 ===
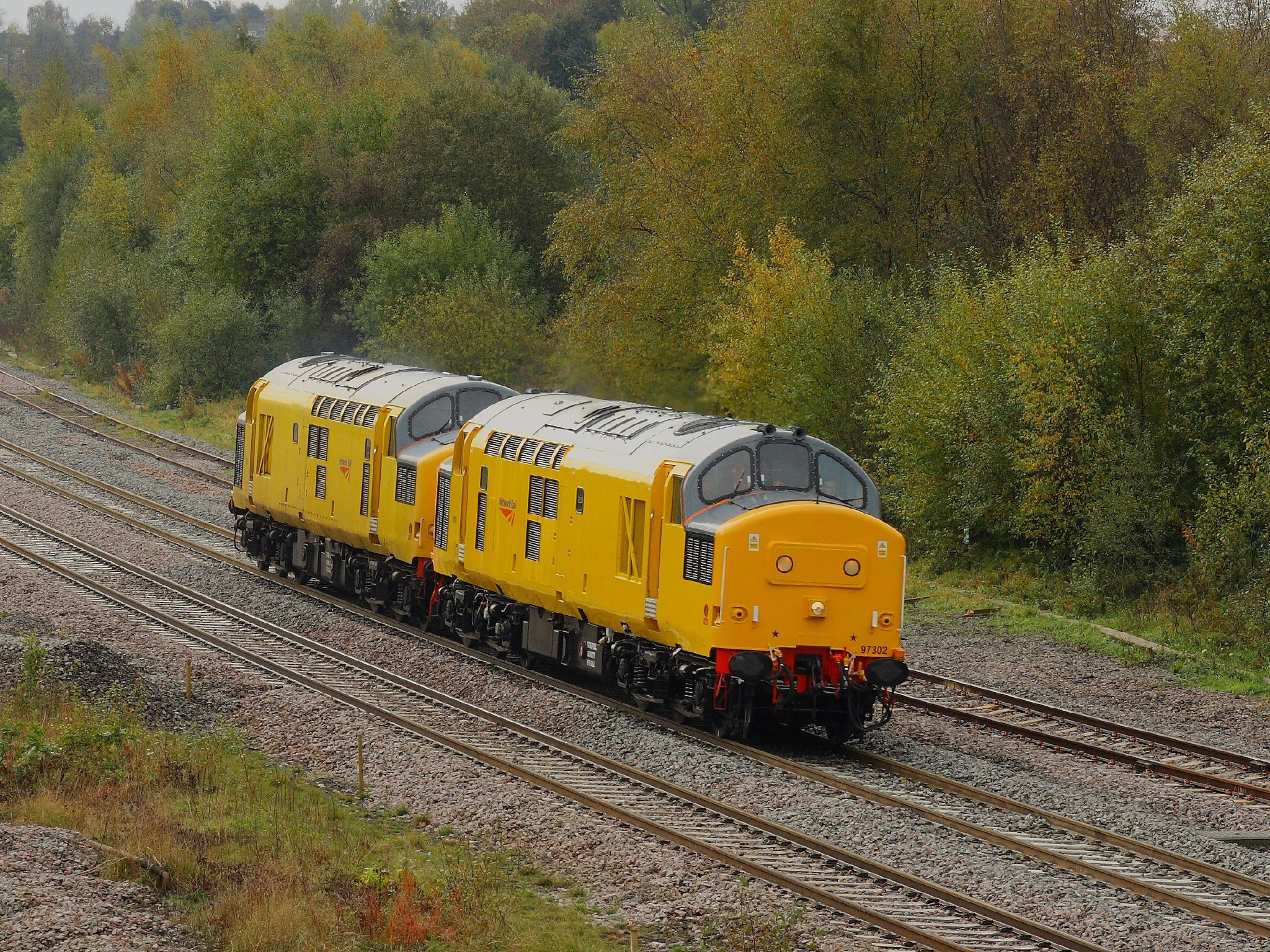
97301 and 97302 at Clay Cross in 2008

These locomotives have been refurbished from Class 37 locomotives at Barrow Hill Roundhouse by Network Rail and have been fitted with ERTMS signalling equipment. They are intended for use primarily on the Cambrian lines from Shrewsbury to Aberystwyth and Pwllheli, which requires an ERTMS-capable fleet. The locomotives were formerly 37100, 37170, 37178 and 37217 respectively. A new inspection shed was built in 2008 at Coleham (Sutton Bridge Junction) in Shrewsbury for these locos.

On 2 September 2009, one of the locomotives (97303) hit a car on an unmanned level crossing near Penrhyndeudraeth, killing the car's driver.

On 15 May 2024, 97304 was named Rheilffordd Talyllyn Railway at Tywyn by Peter Hendy, chairman of Network Rail. This was to commemorate 73 years of preservation of the Talyllyn Railway, and the close relationship between the commercial and preserved railways.

=== 97401–97402 ===
97401 was a Class 46 'Peak' locomotive, bought by the Derby-based Railway Technical Centre straight from British Rail service in 1984. This locomotive did not receive its allocated departmental number and retained its original number of 46009. It was used in a high-publicity test, to prove the safety of rail transported nuclear flasks. The locomotive was deliberately crashed into a container at 100 mph (160 km/h). Whilst the locomotive was written off, the flask was undamaged.

A second locomotive, no. 46023, was allocated the departmental number 97402. It was cannibalised for spare parts, to allow no. 46009 to reach the required 100 mph (160 km/h), since Class 46 locomotives are usually restricted to 90 mph (145 km/h).

=== 97403–97404 ===
These two locomotives were converted from Class 46 locomotives (97403 was 46035 and 97404 was 46045). They were operated by the Railway Technical Centre at Derby. 97403 was named "Ixion", and was used to evaluate wheelslip. It was painted in RTC's red/blue livery. 97404 was used as a source of spare parts. Both locomotives have been preserved.

=== 97405–97408 ===
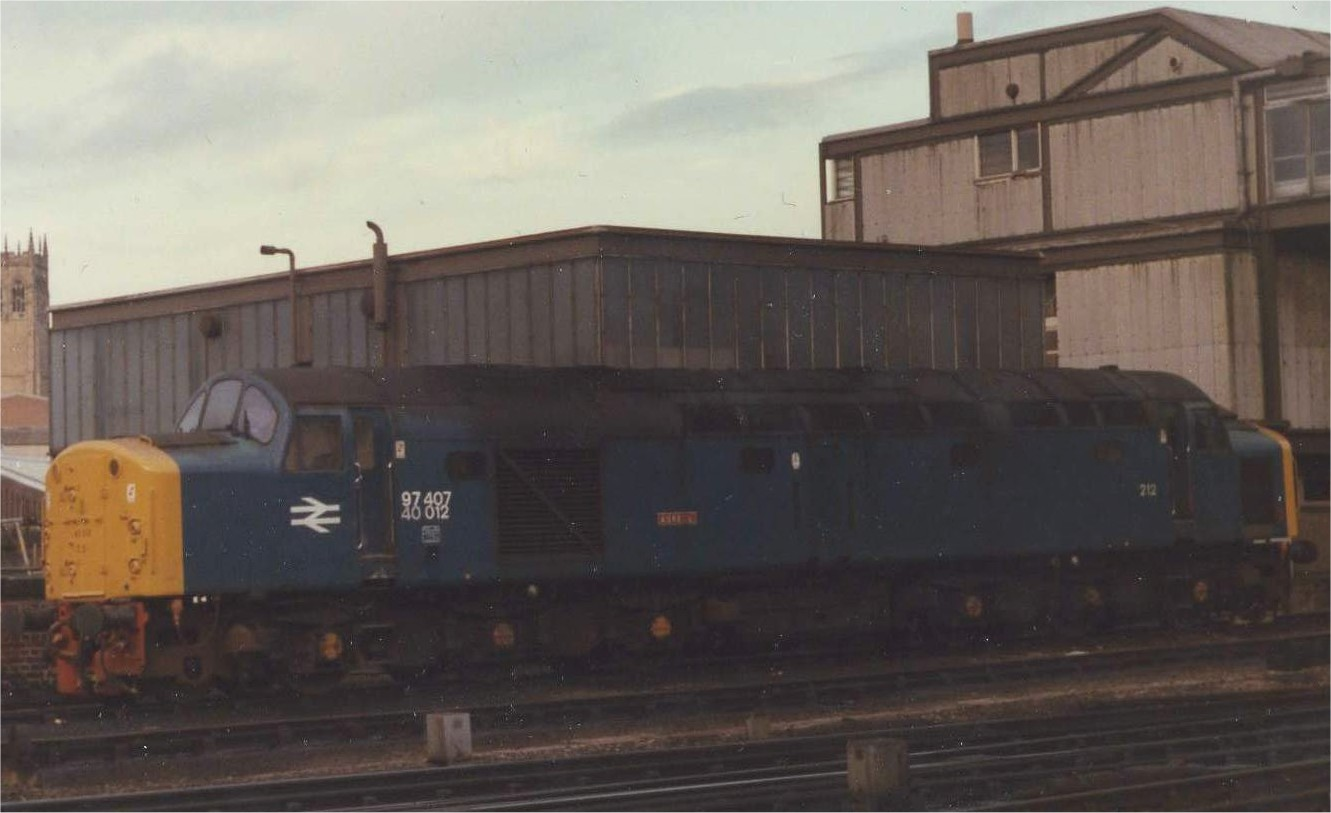
Departmental locomotive 97407 at Manchester Victoria station in 1986. The locomotive still carried its red nameplate, Aureol, and both of its previous numbers; 40012 and (D)212.

These four locomotives were renumbered from Class 40 locomotives, which had all recently been withdrawn from normal traffic. In 1985, they were returned to use and employed on engineering trains around Crewe, and restricted to a maximum speed of 35 mph (56 km/h). A major scheme was in progress to remodel the railways around Crewe railway station. After these duties finished, the four Class 40s continued in departmental service working ballast, freight and occasional parcels trains until finally being withdrawn in 1986/87. However, three of the four were later preserved.

- 97405 – Formerly 40060, the final Class 40 in departmental service and withdrawn in March 1987, unofficially named Ancient Mariner, this locomotive was cut up at Vic Berry in March 1988.
- 97406 – Formerly 40135, later preserved at the East Lancashire Railway.
- 97407 – Formerly 40012 Aureol, later preserved at the Midland Railway – Butterley.
- 97408 – Formerly 40118, later preserved at Battlefield Railway.

=== 97409–97413 ===
These five locomotives were renumbered from Class 45 'Peak' locomotives. They were used on infrastructure trains in association with major engineering works. All five locomotives were withdrawn by 1988, and have all since been scrapped.

=== 97472, 97480, 97545 and 97561 ===
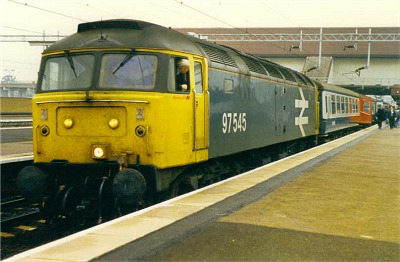
No.97545, formerly Class 47 No.47545, at Birmingham International station in 1989

These four locomotives were converted from Class 47 locomotives in 1989, and were used to haul test-trains throughout the country. Number 97561 was repainted in maroon livery and named "Midland Counties Railway" to commemorate the railway's 150th anniversary.

Three of the four locomotives were later renumbered into the range 47971–973, but continued to be employed hauling test-trains. They were later joined by 47974–976 and 47981. The fourth locomotive, no. 97472, was renumbered back to number 47472, and shortly after was withdrawn from traffic due to fire damage.

=== 97650–97654 ===
These shunting locomotives were purpose-built by Ruston & Hornsby at Lincoln in 1953 (97650) or 1959 (rest).

=== 97701–97710 ===
These battery locomotives were converted from the driving motor cars from former Class 501 electric multiple units, and usually worked in pairs. They were modified by the removal of the seats, sealing of the doors and windows, and flattening of the roof. The locomotives were able to work on third rail and by battery. They were powered by large batteries containing 160 cells, to work four 128 kW (172 hp) traction motors. Two were based at Birkenhead North TMD and were employed around Birkenhead on the Merseyrail system (97701-702). Others worked around North London and Glasgow.

=== 97800–97807 ===
This number range was reserved for shunting locomotives converted from capital stock. Individual locomotives are described below.

- 97800 – This locomotive was converted from a Class 08 locomotive 08600 in 1979 for use as a shunter at Slade Green Depot. It was named Ivor, and was later painted in Network SouthEast livery. In 1990, this locomotive returned to capital stock with its original number.
- 97801 – This locomotive was converted from a Class 08 locomotive in 1978 for use by the Research Department at Derby. It was originally numbered RDB 968020, but was given a Class 97 number in 1979. It was named 'Pluto', used to evaluate a remote control system and withdrawn in 1981.
- 97802 – This locomotive was converted from a Class 08 locomotive in 1979 for use at Polmadie depot. It was used for only a year in this role before withdrawal.
- 97803 – This locomotive was converted from British Rail's last remaining Class 05 locomotive, no. 05001. It was used on the Isle of Wight railway system, based at Ryde, and was rebuilt with a lower cab to allow it to be used through the restricted-height Ryde Tunnel. It was withdrawn as non-standard, and was replaced by no. 97805.
- 97804 – This locomotive was used at Reading Signal Works following the withdrawal of 97020, and was converted from a Class 06 locomotive, no. 06003. It was made redundant when the works closed in 1984, and was later preserved. It is now the sole-surviving Class 06 locomotive.
- 97805 – This locomotive was converted from a Class 03 locomotive to replace the non-standard 97803. It was later renumbered back to its original number of 03079, and remained in use on the Isle of Wight until 1996.
- 97806 – This locomotive was a former Class 09 locomotive, which was allocated to Sudbrook for exclusive use on the Severn Tunnel emergency train. The train has been replaced by former Class 121 diesel units, and 97806 returned to capital stock with its original number, 09017.
- 97807 – This locomotive was converted from a Class 03 to assist 97805 on the Isle of Wight. It was later renumbered back to its original number of 03179, and remained in use on the Isle of Wight until 1996.

=== 97901–97903 ===
This number range is used by the fleet of Battery-Electric shunters on the Tyne and Wear Metro system built by the Hunslet Engine Company of Leeds.

== Preservation ==
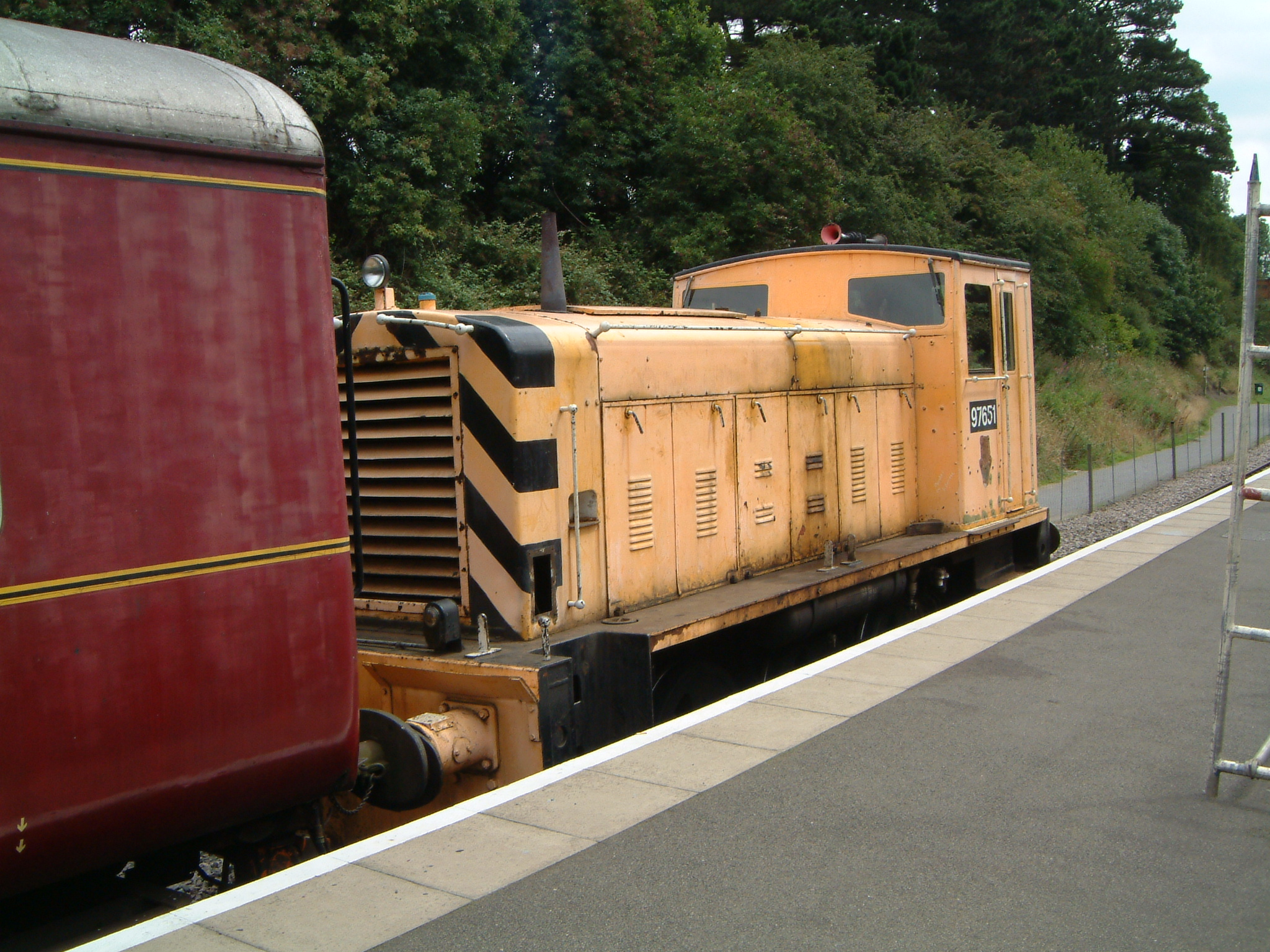
Locomotive 97651 at Northampton and Lamport Railway

Several Class 97 locomotives have been preserved on heritage railways.

- 97201 / 24061 – North Yorkshire Moors Railway
- 97403 / 46035 – Privately owned, based at Peak Rail
- 97404 / 46045 – Midland Railway – Butterley
- 97406 / 40135 – East Lancashire Railway
- 97407 / 40012 – Midland Railway – Butterley
- 97408 / 40118 – Battlefield Railway
- 97650 – Lincolnshire Wolds Railway
- 97651 – Swindon and Cricklade Railway
- 97654 – Peak Rail
- 97803 / 05001 – Isle of Wight Steam Railway
- 97804 / 06003 – Barrow Hill Engine Shed
- 97805 / 03079 – Derwent Valley Light Railway

== Locomotive details ==
Key:	In service	Withdrawn	Preserved	Returned to normal traffic	Scrapped

Number	Name	Previous Number(s)	Previous Class	Converted	Use	Withdrawn	Disposal
97020	-	20	-	New (1957)	S&T Shunter	1981	Scrapped (1982)
97201	Experiment	D5061 / 24061 / RDB 968007	24	1979	Test trains	1988	Preserved on North Yorkshire Moors Railway
97202	-	D5281 / 25131	25	1983	Training loco	1984	Scrapped (6/1987 Vic Berry, Leicester)
97203	-	D5831 / 31298	31	1986	Test trains	1987	Scrapped (11/89 CF Booth Rotherham)
97204	-	D5861 / 31326	31	1987	Test-trains	1989	Returned to capital stock – 31970. Scrapped (03/97 MRJ Phillips at Crewe Works)
97250	Ethel 1	D7660 / 25310	25	1983	Electric Heat Generator	1987	Scrapped (08/94 MC Metals)
97251	Ethel 2	D7655 / 25305	25	1983	Electric Heat Generator	1990	Scrapped (08/94 MC Metals)
97252	Ethel 3	D7664 / 25314	25	1983	Electric Heat Generator	1990	Scrapped (08/94 MC Metals)
97301	-	D6800 / 37100	37	2008	ERTMS Signalling Test Loco	-	Stored at Colwick TMD (Boden Rail) being stripped for spares
97302	Rheilffyrdd Ffestiniog ac Eryri/Ffestiniog and Welsh Highland Railways	37170	37	2008	ERTMS Signalling Test Loco, Cambrian line maintenance	-	-
97303	Dave Berry	37178	37	2008	ERTMS Signalling Test Loco, Cambrian line maintenance	-	-
97304	Rheilffordd Talyllyn Railway	37217	37	2008	ERTMS Signalling Test Loco, Cambrian Line maintenance	-	-
97401	-	D146 / 46009	46	1983	Nuclear flask safety test	1984	Destroyed in test (07/84 V Berry at Old Dalby)
97402	-	D160 / 46023	46	1983	Spares for 97401	1984	Scrapped (03/94 J&S Metals at Crewe Basford Hall Yard)
97403	Ixion	D172 / 46035	46	1984	Test trains	1991	Preserved at Peak Rail
97404	-	D182 / 46045	46	1984	Test trains	1991	Preserved at Midland Railway – Butterley
97405	Ancient Mariner	D260 / 40060	40	1985	Infrastructure trains	1987	Scrapped (03/88 V Berry Leicester)
97406	-	D335 / 40135	40	1985	Infrastructure trains	1986	Preserved on East Lancashire Railway
97407	Aureol	D212 / 40012	40	1985	Infrastructure trains	1986	Preserved at Midland Railway – Butterley
97408	-	D318 / 40118	40	1985	Infrastructure trains	1986	Preserved at Battlefield Railway
97409	Lytham St Anne's	D60 / 45022	45	1987	Infrastructure trains	1988	Scrapped (10/91 MC Metals Glasgow)
97410	-	D30 / 45029	45	1987	Infrastructure trains	1988	Scrapped (10/91 MC Metals Glasgow)
97411	-	D42 / 45034	45	1987	Infrastructure trains	1988	Scrapped (5/92 MC Metals Glasgow)
97412	-	D50 / 45040	45	1987	Infrastructure trains	1988	Scrapped (10/91 MC Metals Glasgow)
97413	-	D114 / 45066	45	1987	Infrastructure trains	1988	Scrapped (10/91 MC Metals Glasgow)
97472	-	D1600 / 47472	47	1989	Test-trains	1991	Returned to capital stock – 47472. Scrapped (05/97 MRJ Phillips at Old Oak Common MPD)
97480	Robin Hood	D1616 / 47480	47	1989	Test-trains	1991	Returned to capital stock – 47971. Scrapped (11/01 HNRC at EMR Kingsbury)
97545	-	D1646 / 47545	47	1989	Test-trains	1991	Returned to capital stock – 47972. Scrapped (03/10 CF Booth Rotherham)
97561	Midland Counties Railway	D1614 / 47034 / 47561	47	1989	Test-trains	1991	Returned to capital stock – 47973. Scrapped (03/97 MRJ Phillips at Crewe Works)
97650	-	PWM650	-	New (1953)	Shunting duties	1987	Preserved on Lincolnshire Wolds Railway
97651	-	PWM651	-	New (1959)	Shunting duties	1996	Preserved on Swindon and Cricklade Railway
97652	-	PWM652	-	New (1959)	Shunting duties	1987	Scrapped (1990)
97653	-	PWM653	-	New (1959)	Shunting duties	1993	Withdrawn
97654	-	PWM654	-	New (1959)	Shunting duties	2005	Preserved on Peak Rail
97701 (Note: Renumbered to DB977362 prior to withdrawal.)	-	61136 / 975178	501	1974	Battery locomotive at Birkenhead	1993	Scrapped Coopers Metals, Sheffield 5/94
97702 (Note: Renumbered to DB977363 prior to withdrawal.)	-	61139 / 975179	501	1974	Battery locomotive at Birkenhead	1993	Scrapped Coopers Metals, Sheffield 5/94
97703	-	61182	501	1980	Battery locomotive at Cricklewood / Hornsey	April-1995	Scrapped – Hornsey on site by Cookson & Son (Demolition) 9/95
97704	-	61185	501	1980	Battery locomotive at Cricklewood / Hornsey	April 1995	Scrapped – Hornsey on site by Cookson & Son (Demolition) 9/95
97705	-	61184	501	1980	Battery locomotive at Cricklewood / Hornsey	April 1995	Scrapped – Hornsey on site by Cookson & Son (Demolition) 10/95
97706	-	61189	501	1980	Battery locomotive at Cricklewood / Hornsey	April 1995	Scrapped – Hornsey on site by Cookson & Son (Demolition) 10/95
97707	-	61166 / 975407	501	1975	Battery locomotive at Hornsey	April 1995	Scrapped – Hornsey on site by Cookson & Son (Demolition) 10/95
97708	-	61173 / 975408	501	1975	Battery locomotive at Hornsey	April 1995	Scrapped – Hornsey on site by Cookson & Son (Demolition) 10/95
97709	-	61172 / 975409	501	1975	Battery locomotive at Hornsey	April 1995	Scrapped – Hornsey on site by Cookson & Son (Demolition) 10/95
97710	-	61175 / 975410	501	1975	Battery locomotive at Hornsey	April 1995	Scrapped – Hornsey on site by Cookson & Son (Demolition) 10/95
97750	-	L50	London Underground battery-electric locomotives	-	Shunting duties	-	-
97751	-	L51	London Underground battery-electric locomotives	-	Shunting duties	-	-
97800	Ivor	D3767 / 08600	08	1979	Shunting duties	1990	Returned to capital stock – 08600
97801	Pluto	13337 / D3337 / 08267 / RDB 968020	08	1978	Shunting duties Mickleover / Evaluate remote control system	1981	Scrapped (08/85 V Berry Leicester)
97802	-	13085 / D3085 / 08070	08	1979	Shunting duties	1980	Scrapped (04/80 BREL Glasgow Works)
97803	-	11140 / D2554 / 05001	05	1981	Shunting duties	1983	Preserved on Isle of Wight Steam Railway
97804	-	D2420 / 06003	06	1981	Shunting duties	1984	Preserved at Barrow Hill Engine Shed
97805	-	D2079 / 03079	03	1984	Shunting duties	1996	Returned to capital stock – 03079 – now preserved Derwent Valley Light Railway
97806	-	D4105 / 09017	09	1987	Severn Tunnel Emergency Train	1997	Returned to capital stock – 09017
97807	-	D2179 / 03179	03	1989	Shunting duties	1996	Returned to capital stock – 03179 – owned by Govia Thameslink Railway
97901	-	BL1	-	-	Tyne & Wear Metro shunter + works locomotive	-	-
97902	-	BL2	-	-	Tyne & Wear Metro shunter + works locomotive	Unknown	Removed from service, Spares Donor Locomotive
97903	Lewis Potts Metro Engineer from 1975 to 2016	BL3	-	-	Tyne & Wear Metro shunter + works locomotive	Unknown	Removed from service, Spares Donor Locomotive
