= British Rail Class D2/5 =

British diesel powered locomotive

Type and origin
- Power type: Diesel-mechanical
- Builder: Andrew Barclay Sons & Co.
- Serial number: 402–411
- Build date: 1956–1957
- Total produced: 10
Specifications
- Configuration
  - Whyte: 0-6-0 DM
  - UIC: C
- Gauge: 4 ft 8 1/2 in (1,435 mm) standard gauge
- Wheel diameter: 3 ft 6 in (1.067 m)
- Loco weight: 32 long tons (33 t; 36 short tons)
- Prime mover: Gardner 8L3
- Transmission: Mechanical, Wilson four-speed gearbox
- MU working: Not fitted
- Train heating: None
- Train brakes: None
Performance figures
- Maximum speed: 17.75 mph (28.6 km/h)
- Power output: Engine: 204 bhp (152 kW)
- Tractive effort: 15,340 lbf (68.2 kN)
Career
- Operators: British Rail
- Class: DJ14; later D2/5; later 2/12A
- Numbers: 11177–11186; D2400–D2409 from 1959 to 1961
- Axle load class: Route availability 2
- Withdrawn: 1967–1969
- Disposition: All scrapped

The British Rail Class D2/5 was a locomotive commissioned by British Rail in England. It was a diesel powered locomotive in the pre-TOPS period built by Andrew Barclay with a Gardner engine.

== History ==
The Eastern and North Eastern Regions (E&NER) originally classified them DJ14 under a scheme devised in 1954 where "D" denoted Diesel, and "J" denoted the 0-6-0 wheel arrangement. They were subsequently reclassified by the E&NER D2/5 (February 1960) and then 2/12A (June 1962). They were reported in several sources as having received the TOPS classification Class 05, along with Hunslet shunter D2554 (the last surviving member of Class D2/8 (2/15A from 1962)), though this was in error, and the D2/5 machines are not listed as such in the latest works by Marsden, 2011.

Table of withdrawals
Year	Quantity in service at start of year	Quantity withdrawn	Locomotive numbers
1967	10	4	D2400/02/06/08
1968	6	3	D2401/05/09
1969	3	3	D2403–04/07

== Fleet list ==
Building, renumbering and withdrawal occurred as follows:

Maker's number	First BR number	Introduced	Renumbered	2nd number	Withdrawn
402	11177	July 1956	November 1960	D2400	October 1967
403	11178	July 1956	November 1960	D2401	December 1968
404	11179	September 1956	February 1961	D2402	September 1967
405	11180	October 1956	November 1960	D2403	January 1969
406	11181	November 1956	January 1961	D2404	January 1969
407	11182	December 1956	April 1959	D2405	December 1968
408	11183	December 1956	December 1960	D2406	May 1967
409	11184	January 1957	November 1960	D2407	January 1969
410	11185	February 1957	April 1959	D2408	May 1967
411	11186	March 1957	January 1961	D2409	December 1968

== See also ==
List of British Rail classes
