= Severn Bridge Junction =

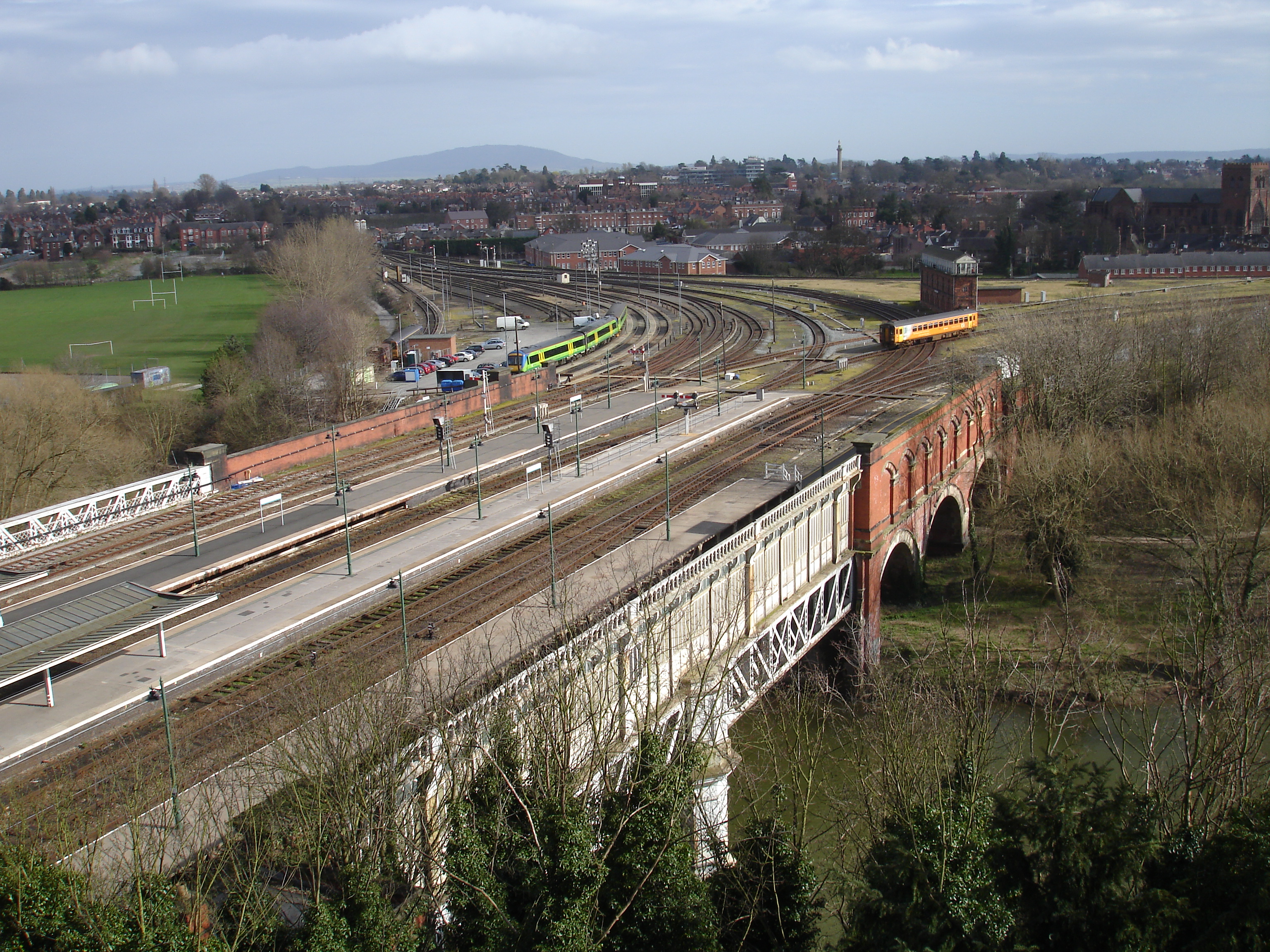
- Severn Bridge Junction as viewed from Shrewsbury Castle
- Interactive map of Severn Bridge Junction
- Coordinates: 52°42′32″N 2°44′45″W
- Country: England
- Town: Shrewsbury

Severn Bridge Junction is the area of railway lines just south east of Shrewsbury railway station, in Shropshire, England. It is controlled by a mechanical interlocked signal box of the same name, which is the largest operational mechanical signal box in the world. The Network Rail signalling area code is 'SBJ.'

== Background ==
The complexity of the railway system in the area is brought about by the convergence of five major lines at Shrewsbury, built in the Victorian era by two competing and yet also co-operating railway companies, the Great Western Railway and the London and North Western Railway. They were competing to connect the coal and raw material supplies of South Wales with the industrialised Midlands and Northwest; and secondly to transport passengers to and from London to the port of Liverpool. After the GWR amalgamated with the Cambrian Railways in 1921, it was also a major point of accessing GWR services into Mid and West Wales:

- Cambrian Line (GWR)
- Shrewsbury to Chester Line (GWR)
- Wolverhampton to Shrewsbury Line (GWR)
- Welsh Marches Line:
  - North to Crewe via Crewe and Shrewsbury Railway (LNWR)
  - South to Newport via Shrewsbury and Hereford Railway (Joint)

Lines formerly converging in the area also include the regionally important Severn Valley Railway (GWR), and the Stafford to Shrewsbury Line (LNWR).

== Junction ==
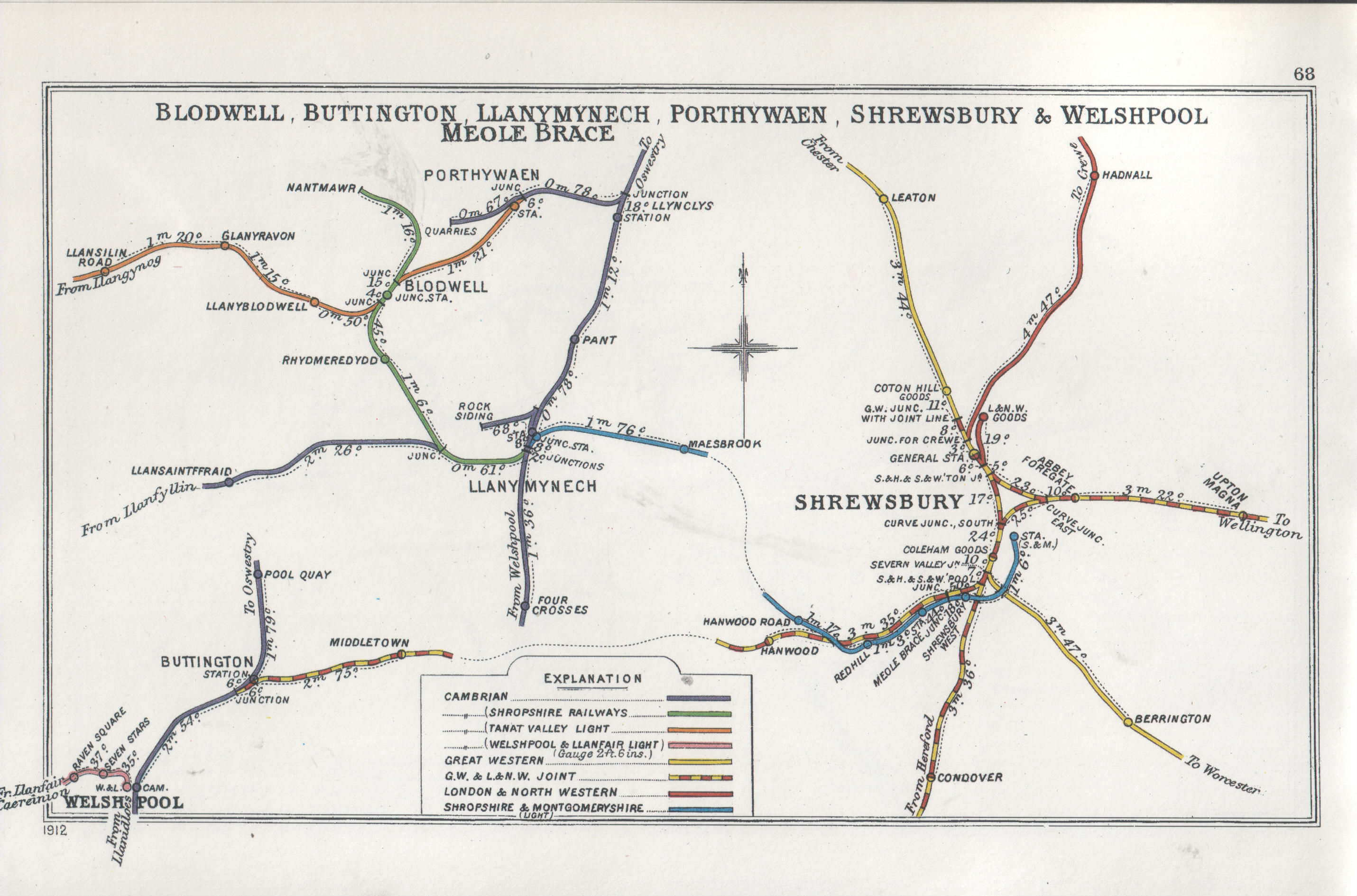
A 1912 Railway Clearing House Junction Diagram showing (right) railways in the vicinity of Shrewsbury. Severn Bridge Junction is indicated as S.&H. & S.&W.'TON J^{N}

The railway junction lies directly south of the railway station. It was constructed jointly by the GWR/LNWR after the completion of improvements to their jointly owned Shrewsbury and Hereford Railway, which at this location junctioned with the Wolverhampton to Shrewsbury Line. To allow freight trains to move to/from South Wales direct to the Midlands and hence avoid the passenger railway station, the junction was constructed in a tight triangular form south of the River Severn.

== Signal box ==
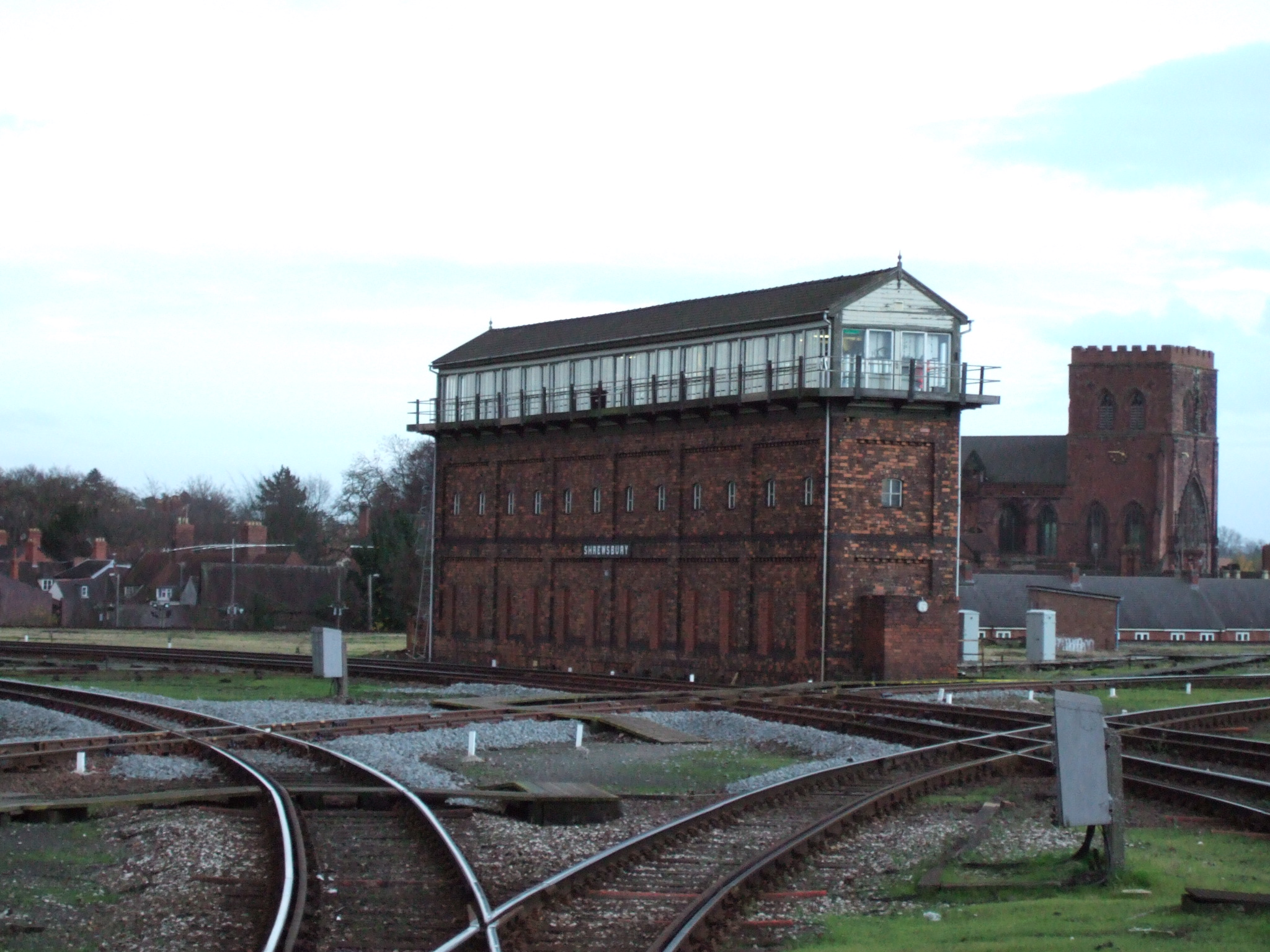
The signal box as viewed from Shrewsbury station. Shrewsbury Abbey is in the background.

Jointly constructed from 1902 to an enlarged standard LNWR design of 1876, the three storey structure is built of two storeys of red brick and cement, with a third floor mainly of wooden weather board pin-panel containing the glass windows, all topped by a Welsh slate pitched roof. Access is via a door on the rear, with the lower two floors housing interlocking signalling equipment accessed via two internal wooden staircases. The main operational floor houses a 180 lever interlocked frame, divided into two sections: Abbey Foregate to Sutton Bridge; Shrewsbury station to Crewe Junction.

The frame scale makes it the largest remaining mechanical signal box on the British network, and from 2011 it became the largest mechanical signalbox in the world, following the closure of the 191 lever box at Spencer Street in Melbourne, Australia.

Today only approximately half of the levers are in operational use, although it still takes two signallers to operate the complete system on a 24/7 basis, allowing 300 train movements per day.

The signal box is a grade II listed building and underwent extensive heritage renovation in 2020-21, carried out by Network Rail.

== Future ==
Although there have been line closures in the Shrewsbury area, and the closure of the joint motive power depot at the end of the steam era in the 1960s, there is still a complex residual converging rail system in the area. Within 1 mile (1.6 km) of the junction, there are another three interlocked mechanical signal boxes:

- Abbey Foregate Junction: located on the Wolverhampton line to allow access to the adjacent Abbey Foregate yard; its code is 'AF'.
- Crewe Junction: located on the north side of the station, at the convergence of the lines from Crewe and Wrexham; its code is 'CJ'.
- Sutton Bridge Junction: located south of English Bridge Junction, at the convergence of the line to Hereford and the Cambrian Line; its code is 'SUB'.

A further three boxes that had formed part of the local system:

- Crewe Bank: closed 8 December 2012.
- English Bridge: controlled the southside of the triangular junction through Coleham to Sutton Bridge Junction. Closed in 1953, its controls were transferred to Severn Bridge.
- Harlescott Crossing: closed 8 December 2012.

Network Rail currently believes that to simplify this system to allow it to be remotely controlled through colour-light signals would not be economical. Hence the current mechanical signalling system in the area is presently envisaged to remain in operation until at least 2030, and possibly as long as 2050 on current plans.

== See also ==
- Shrewsbury Traction Maintenance Depot#Abbey Foregate – the adjacent Abbey Foregate Yard
- Railways of Shropshire
