= British Rail Class 05 =

Class of 69 204hp diesel-mechanical shunting locomotives

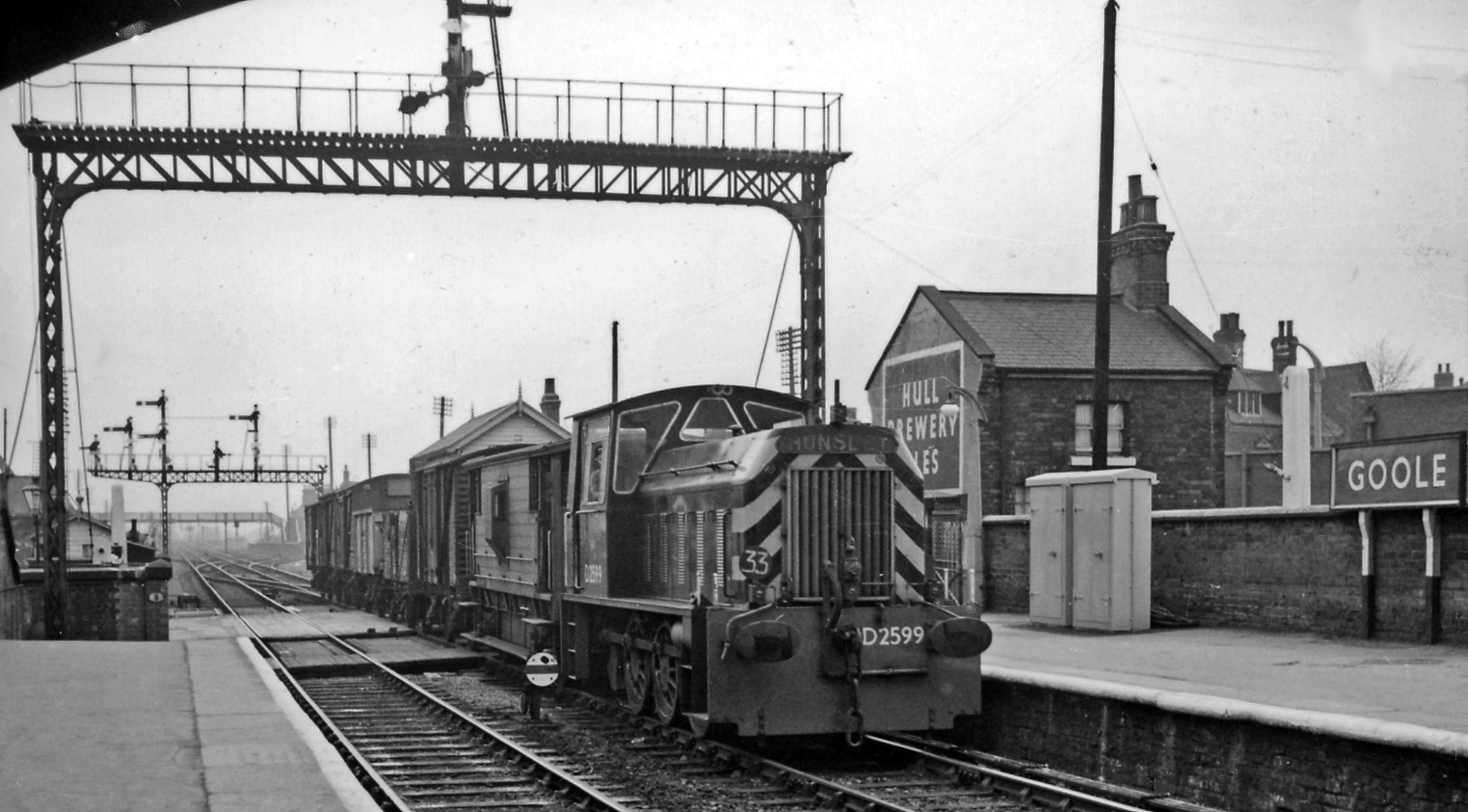
- D2599 at Goole with a short freight train in 1961.
Type and origin
- Power type: Diesel-mechanical
- Builder: Hunslet Engine Co.
- Build date: 1955–1961
- Total produced: 69
Specifications
- Configuration
  - Whyte: 0-6-0
  - UIC: C
- Gauge: 4 ft 8 1/2 in (1,435 mm)
- Wheel diameter: 3 ft 4 in (1.016 m)
- Minimum curve: 2 chains (40.23 m)
- Wheelbase: 9 ft 0 in (2.743 m)
- Length: 25 ft 4 in (7.72 m)
- Width: 8 ft 3 in (2.515 m)
- Height: 11 ft 0 in (3.353 m)
- Loco weight: D2550-D2573 31 tonnes (31 long tons; 34 short tons) other locos 32 tonnes (31 long tons; 35 short tons)
- Fuel capacity: 300 imp gal (1,400 L; 360 US gal)
- Prime mover: Gardner 8L3
- Engine type: Four-stroke diesel
- Transmission: Hunslet 4-speed gearbox, Hunslet patent friction clutch, Hunslet reversing gearbox and final drive.
- Train heating: None
- Train brakes: Vacuum
Performance figures
- Maximum speed: 18 mph (29 km/h)
- Power output: Engine: 204 hp (152 kW)
- Tractive effort: Maximum: 14,500 lbf (64 kN)
- Brakeforce: 14 long tons-force (139 kN)
Career
- Operators: British Railways
- Number in class: 69
- Numbers: 11136-11143; 11161-11176 later D2550-D2557, D2558-D2573 (renumbered), D2574-D2618; D2554 later 05001, then 97803
- Axle load class: RA 2
- Retired: 1966–1968 (except D2554), 1985
- Disposition: Four preserved, remainder scrapped

The British Rail Class 05 is a class of 0-6-0 diesel-mechanical shunters built by Hunslet Engine Company from 1955 to 1961. They were used on the Eastern and Scottish Regions of British Railways. The first two batches were delivered as 11136-11143 (later renumbered D2550-D2557) and 11161-11176 (later renumbered D2558-D2573). Subsequent locomotives were delivered, new, as D2574-D2618.

The British Rail Class D2/5 built by Andrew Barclay Sons & Co. were reported in several sources as having received the TOPS class number 05, though this was in error, and they are not listed as such in the latest works by Marsden, 2011.

== Overview ==
Most were withdrawn early (due to a surplus of shunting locomotives, resulting from the network cuts of the 1960s) and replaced by classes 03 and 04, with the exception of D2554, which was transferred to the Isle of Wight, in 1966, to aid the electrification of the Island Line. Owing to its apparent suitability for working on the island, it was retained in working order and given the TOPS number 05001. It was transferred to departmental stock in 1981, being given the number 97803, and remained in service until 1985, when it was withdrawn and sold to the Isle of Wight Steam Railway.

== Technical details ==
The engine is a Gardner 8-cylinder, 4 stroke 8L3 of 204 hp (152 kW) connected to a Hunslet 4-speed gearbox through a Hunslet patent friction clutch. Final drive is via a Hunslet reversing gearbox and jackshaft.

== Preservation ==
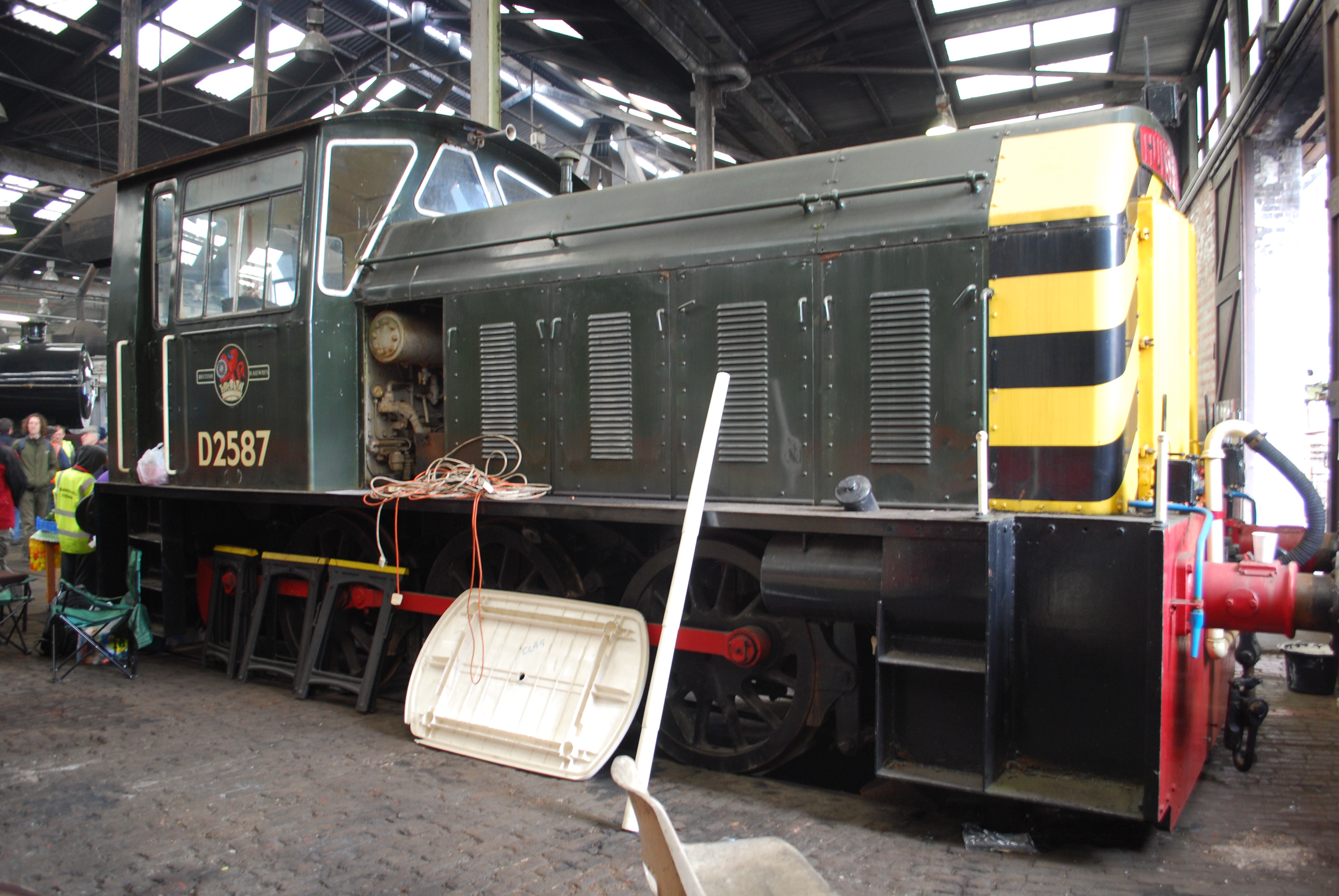
D2587 as preserved at Barrow Hill Roundhouse in 2012.

Four class 05 locomotives have been preserved:

- D2554 "Nuclear Fred" at Isle of Wight Steam Railway. This engine has, at various times, carried the numbers 11140, 05001 and 97803
- D2578 "Cider Queen", privately preserved by the D2578 Locomotive Group at Moreton Business Park, Herefordshire.
- D2587 by Heritage Shunters Trust
- D2595 at Ribble Steam Railway

Didcot Railway Centre has a similar-looking industrial example numbered DL26, but it is not a BR class 05. It is one of a batch of four built by Hunslet in 1958 with a 264 hp National Gas engine and a higher bonnet line. DL26 and its sister DL25 worked in the NCB East Midlands area at Pleasley Pit, from where it was acquired for preservation. It is currently painted in original green livery but with an early BR emblem on the cab sides. It was the main shunter on the site until the arrival of a Class 08, and it still sees occasional use for shunting. It cannot be used on passenger trains due to its lack of vacuum brakes. The Isle of Wight Steam Railway's own 05 001/D2554 can be seen frequently but it cannot run passenger trains, due to the Island's unique vintage air braked rolling stock.

== Models ==
The Class 05 are available as a ready-to-run model in OO gauge by Silver Fox Models, 4mm OO gauge by Heljan (August 2015) and in 7mm O gauge in September 2017.

== Sources ==
- Haresnape, Brian (October 1984). British Rail Fleet Survey 7: Diesel Shunters. Shepperton: Ian Allan. ISBN 0-7110-1449-3. GE/1084.
- Marsden, Colin J. (1981). Motive power recognition:1 Locomotives. Shepperton: Ian Allan Ltd. ISBN 0-7110-1109-5.
- Marsden, Colin J. (November 1984). BR Locomotive Numbering. Shepperton: Ian Allan. ISBN 0-7110-1445-0. EX/1184.
- Strickland, D.C. (March 1983). D+EG Locomotive Directory. Camberley: Diesel & Electric Group. ISBN 0-906375-10-X.
- Marsden, Colin J. (October 2011a). Diesel and Electric Locomotive Recognition Guide. Shepperton: Ian Allan. ISBN 978-0-7110-3637-6.
- Marsden, Colin J. (November 2011b). The Complete UK Modern Traction Locomotive Directory. TheRailwayCentre.com. ISBN 978-0-9557887-8-9.
- British Rail Locomotives and other motive power: Combined volume. London: Ian Allan. 1968. ISBN 0-7110-0008-5.
