= British Rail 10800 =

British diesel locomotive

British Railways 10800
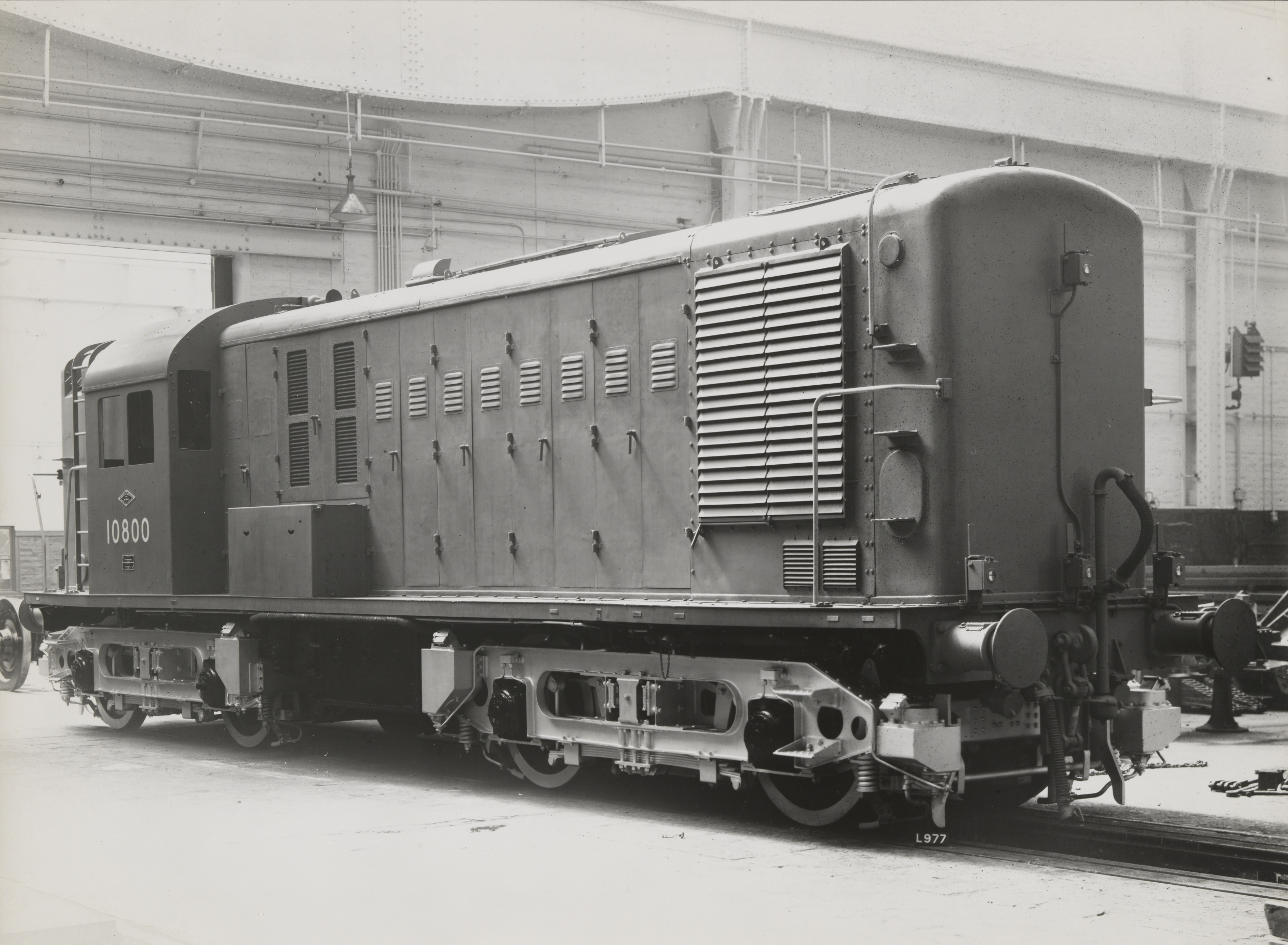
- 10800 at North British Locomotive Company, Glasgow
Type and origin
- Power type: Diesel-electric
- Builder: North British Locomotive Company
- Serial number: 26413
- Build date: 1 July 1950
Specifications
- Configuration
  - Whyte: Bo-Bo
  - AAR: B-B
  - UIC: Bo′Bo′
- Gauge: 4 ft 8 1/2 in (1,435 mm) standard gauge
- Wheel diameter: 3 ft 6 in (1.067 m)
- Minimum curve: 3.75 chains (247.50 ft; 75.44 m)
- Wheelbase: 31 ft 0 in (9.45 m)
- Length: 41 ft 10 1/2 in (12.76 m)
- Width: 9 ft 2 in (2.79 m)
- Height: 12 ft 9 1/2 in (3.90 m)
- Loco weight: 69.80 long tons (70.92 t; 78.18 short tons)
- Fuel capacity: 300 imp gal (1,400 L; 360 US gal)
- Coolant cap.: 85 imp gal (390 L; 102 US gal)
- Water cap.: 90 imp gal (410 L; 110 US gal)
- Prime mover: Paxman 16RPHXL Series 2 rebuilt: Maybach MD655
- Generator: DC
- Traction motors: BTH 159, DC, four (4) off
- Cylinder size: 7 in × 7 3/4 in (177.80 mm × 196.85 mm) rebuilt: 7 1/4 in × 8 3/4 in (184.15 mm × 222.25 mm)
- Transmission: Diesel electric
- MU working: Not fitted
- Train heating: Clarkson steam generator
- Loco brake: Brakeforce: 45 long tons-force (450 kN)
- Train brakes: Vacuum
Performance figures
- Maximum speed: 70 mph (110 km/h)
- Power output: 827 hp (617 kW) rebuilt: 1,400 hp (1,000 kW)
- Tractive effort: 34,500 lbf (153.5 kN)
Career
- Operators: British Railways
- Power class: 3MT; later: Type 1
- Numbers: 10800
- Axle load class: Route availability: 4
- Retired: 8 August 1959
- Disposition: Sold to Brush Traction, rebuilt into research locomotive Hawk, retired 1968, cannibalised 1972–1976, scrapped 1976.

British Railways 10800 was a one-off diesel locomotive built by the North British Locomotive Company for British Railways in 1950. It had been ordered by the London, Midland and Scottish Railway in 1946 but did not appear until after the 1948 nationalisation of the railways.

The locomotive was designed by George Ivatt as a possible replacement for steam locomotives on secondary and branch lines. It was the first British road switcher locomotive. The single-cab layout (long bonnet forward) gave the driver a poor view of the road ahead. However, the driver's view was no worse than that from a steam locomotive cab, so it would have been acceptable at the time.

During its brief time on the Southern Region between 1952 and 1954, 10800 gained the nickname 'The Wonder Engine', from the locomotive department's daily query, 'I wonder if it will go today'.

== Description ==
Due to having been ordered by the LMS before the creation of British Railways (BR), 10800 became the first BR mixed-traffic diesel-electric locomotive when it was delivered in 1950. It was successful enough in operation for BR to order two classes of 54 similar locomotives in 1955 although these classes, the BTH Type 1 and NBL Type 1, used the improved YHXL engine.

== Extra Information ==
- Bogie wheelbase: 8 ft 6 in (2.591 m)
- Bogie pivot centres: 22 ft 6 in (6.86 m)
- Sanding equipment: Pneumatic
- Heating type: Steam (Water-tube boiler) (Clarkson thimble tube boiler)
- Main generator type: BTH
- Aux generator type: BTH
- Gear ratio: 66:15
- Boiler water capacity: 300 imp gal (1,400 L; 360 US gal)
- Boiler fuel capacity:* 90 imp gal (410 L; 110 US gal)

== Rebuilding as an AC transmission prototype ==
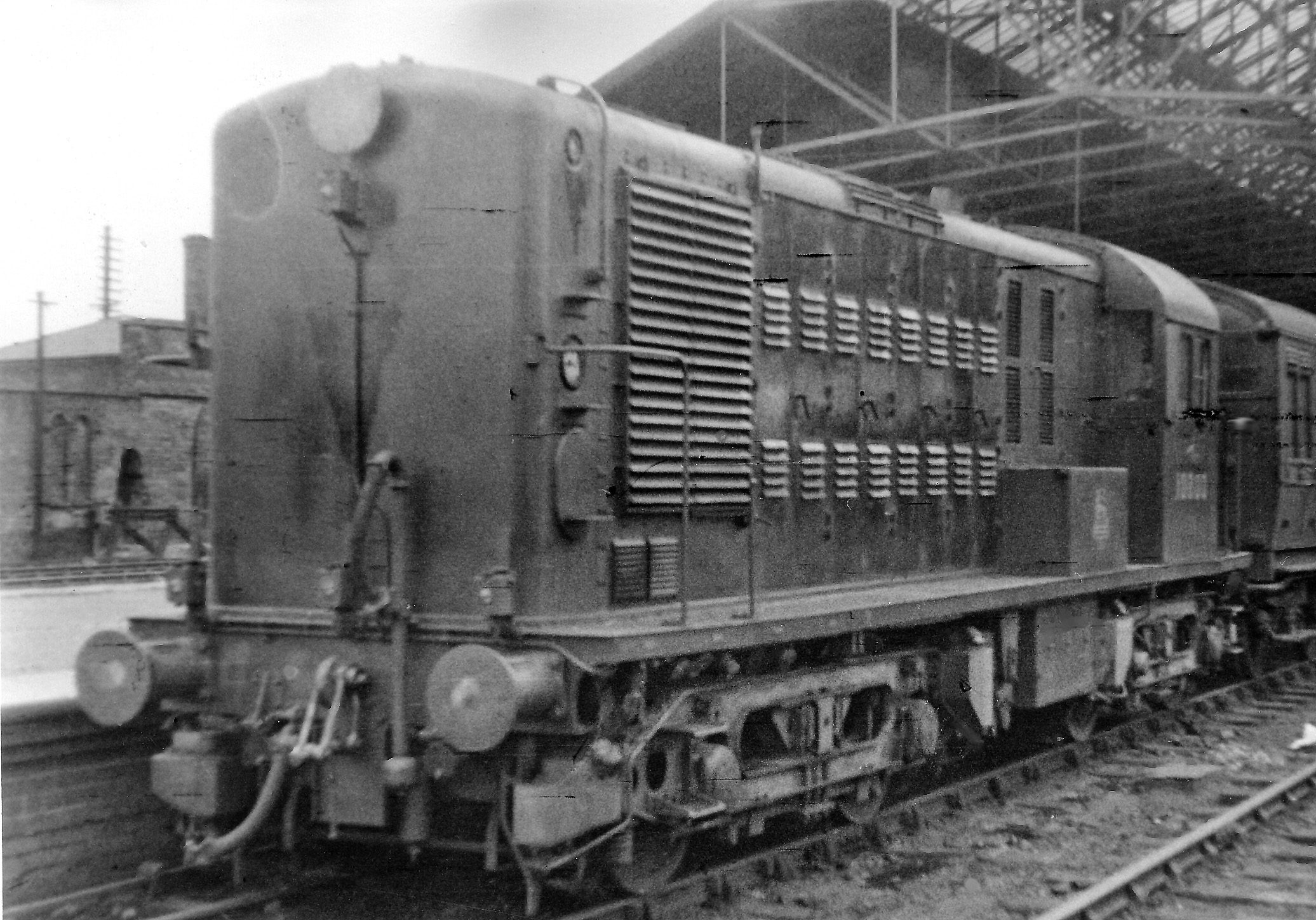
10800 on the down main platform at Rugby

In 1961 No. 10800 was bought by Brush Traction and rebuilt for experiments in AC power transmission. Brush named the locomotive Hawk. DC transmission in diesel-electric locomotives was reaching its limits, at least for single-generator locomotives. (Note: The Deltics had twin engines and generators. Brush's prototype Falcon had also used twin engines and generators.) The brushgear and commutator of a DC generator became prone to flashover for engine powers greater than around 2,700 bhp. The most straightforward solution, rather than redesigning the DC generator, was to adopt an AC alternator instead, which could use a much simpler slipring connection to its field rotor rather than a commutator. (Note: The main improvement is that for the DC generator, the large output current is taken from the rotor and so must pass through the commutator. For the AC alternator, only the much smaller field current needs to be supplied to the rotor and the output current is taken from the static field coils.)

Although the advantages of AC transmission were obvious, the best means to implement suitable traction motors was not. Should these be the familiar DC motors (requiring AC–DC rectification)? Or should AC traction motors be developed, and if so, how would their speed be controlled? (Note: The same question had arisen in France in the mid-1950s, for their 25 kV 50 Hz AC electrification project. Four similar classes of electric locomotive, the BB 12000, BB 13000, CC 14000 and CC 14100 classes, each using a different method, had been produced and tested.) High-power solid-state electronics was in an early state at this time, although Brush were keen to become leaders in the field.

A more powerful engine would be required to give a realistic trial, and Brush already had a suitable one on hand, as a spare from the development of Falcon. This was a Maybach MD655 of 1,400 bhp. The Maybach was also a high-speed diesel engine, running at 1,500 rpm rather than the Paxman's 1,250 rpm. The Paxman was itself considered a high-speed engine, running significantly faster than the English Electric or Sulzer medium-speed (< 1,000 rpm) engines which had been adopted for high-powered British Railways locomotives. The new 100 Hz AC generator was rated at 950 kW (1,270 bhp), a conversion efficiency of 91%. The output was at 1,325V / 600A. New AC traction motors were used, with squirrel cage motors supplied by thyristor variable-frequency drives.

Brush's experience with AC transmission, gained with Hawk, would be put to use a few years later with the development of the 4,000 bhp single-engined AC transmission HS4000 Kestrel.

Hawk was used until 1968, after which its control equipment was becoming obsolete and was superseded by the direct experience from Kestrel. During the 1972 miners' strike the engine and generator were removed as a standby generator for the Brush Falcon works. After this, parts began to be stripped until it was finally scrapped around 1976.
