= British Rail Class 16 =

Diesel electric locomotive built by the North British Locomotive Company

NBL Type 1 British Rail Class 16
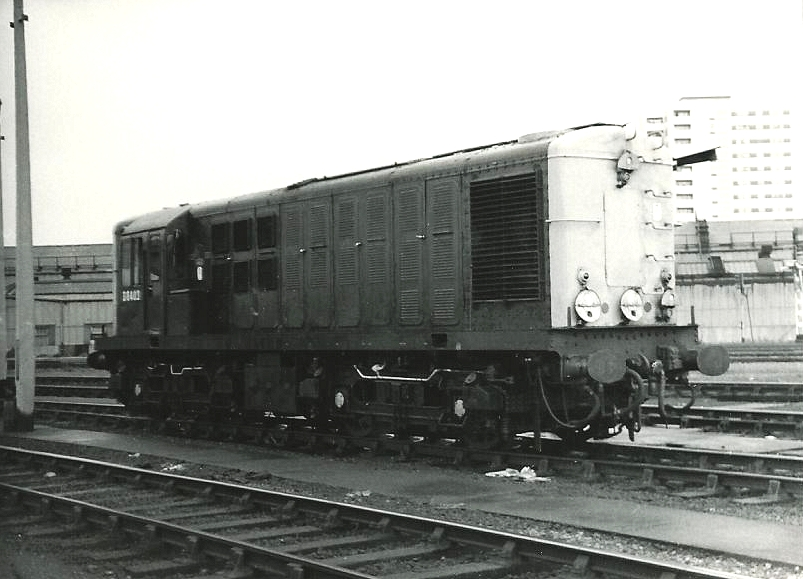
- No. D8403 in green livery with all-yellow front end at Stratford MPD in 1966
Type and origin
- Power type: Diesel-electric
- Builder: North British Locomotive Company
- Serial number: 27671–27680
- Build date: 1958
- Total produced: 10
Specifications
- Configuration
  - UIC: Bo′Bo′
  - Commonwealth: Bo-Bo
- Gauge: 4 ft 8 1/2 in (1,435 mm) standard gauge
- Wheel diameter: 3 ft 7 in (1.092 m)
- Minimum curve: 3.5 chains (70.41 m)
- Wheelbase: 28 ft 6 in (8.69 m)
- Length: 42 ft 6 in (12.95 m)
- Width: 8 ft 8 1/2 in (2.654 m)
- Height: 12 ft 8 in (3.861 m)
- Loco weight: 68 long tons (69 t; 76 short tons)
- Fuel capacity: 400 imp gal (1,800 L; 480 US gal)
- Prime mover: Paxman 16YHXL
- Displacement: 78.4 L (4,780 cu in)
- Generator: GEC WT 881 (plus GEC auxiliary generator
- Traction motors: 4 x GEC WT 441, nose suspended, with single reduction gear drive
- Cylinders: 16
- Cylinder size: 7 in (178 mm) bore 7 3/4 in (197 mm) stroke
- Transmission: Diesel electric
- MU working: ● Red Circle
- Train heating: None; through steam pipe
- Train brakes: Vacuum
Performance figures
- Maximum speed: 60 mph (97 km/h)
- Power output: Engine: 800 hp (597 kW); At rail: 627 hp (468 kW)
- Tractive effort: Maximum: 42,000 lbf (186.8 kN)
- Brakeforce: 31 long tons-force (310 kN)
Career
- Operators: British Rail
- Numbers: D8400–D8409
- Axle load class: Route availability 4
- Retired: 1968
- Disposition: All scrapped

The British Rail Class 16 also known as the North British Type 1 was a type of diesel locomotive designed and manufactured by the North British Locomotive Company. A total of ten were produced, these being numbered D8400-D8409.

The type was ordered by British Railways (BR) as an element of the 1955 Modernisation Plan. The design was largely derived from North British's earlier prototype locomotive, designated No. 10800, produced during the late 1940s; it also incorporated several engineering approaches common to steam locomotives, the company allegedly having difficulty transitioning to the new traction format. Akin to several other Type 1 designs, they were relatively compact locomotives that were intended primarily for local freight traffic. The performance of the type was found to be lacking in comparison with its peers, thus the potential for follow-on orders evaporated and no further examples were constructed beyond the original batch. The Class 16 shared numerous design features with those used on subsequent locomotives by the company, particularly the Class 21 locomotive.

== Background ==
In less than a decade following the formation of British Railways (BR), substantial changes were being made. Under the 1955 Modernisation Plan, a long-term strategy of replacing steam locomotives with a combination of diesel locomotives and electric locomotives was adopted, with the former being largely intended as an interim measure for most areas ahead of widespread electrification of trunk routes. There was also a strong political desire to support British manufacturers in transitioning towards the design and production of these favoured forms of traction. Due to a lack of expertise, this often involved the pairing of traditional locomotive manufacturers with various firms within the electrical sector, even though the latter typically had very limited experience of the railways.

In accordance with these policies, BR ramped up its efforts to convert its fleet, placing numerous orders within a short timeframe for diesel locomotives to several different specifications with various manufacturers. On 16 November 1955, a small order for ten Type 1 freight locomotives was placed with the North British Locomotive Company. Under BR's 'pilot scheme', such batches were intended for evaluation purposes under competitive conditions against rival designs in which the better models would receive follow-on orders. In the Class 16's case, this included the British Thomson-Houston Class 15 and English Electric Class 20

== Construction ==
Distribution of locomotives, October 1967
British Rail Class 16 is located in Southern England
| Code | Name | Quantity |
| 30A | Stratford | 10 |
| Total: | | 10 |

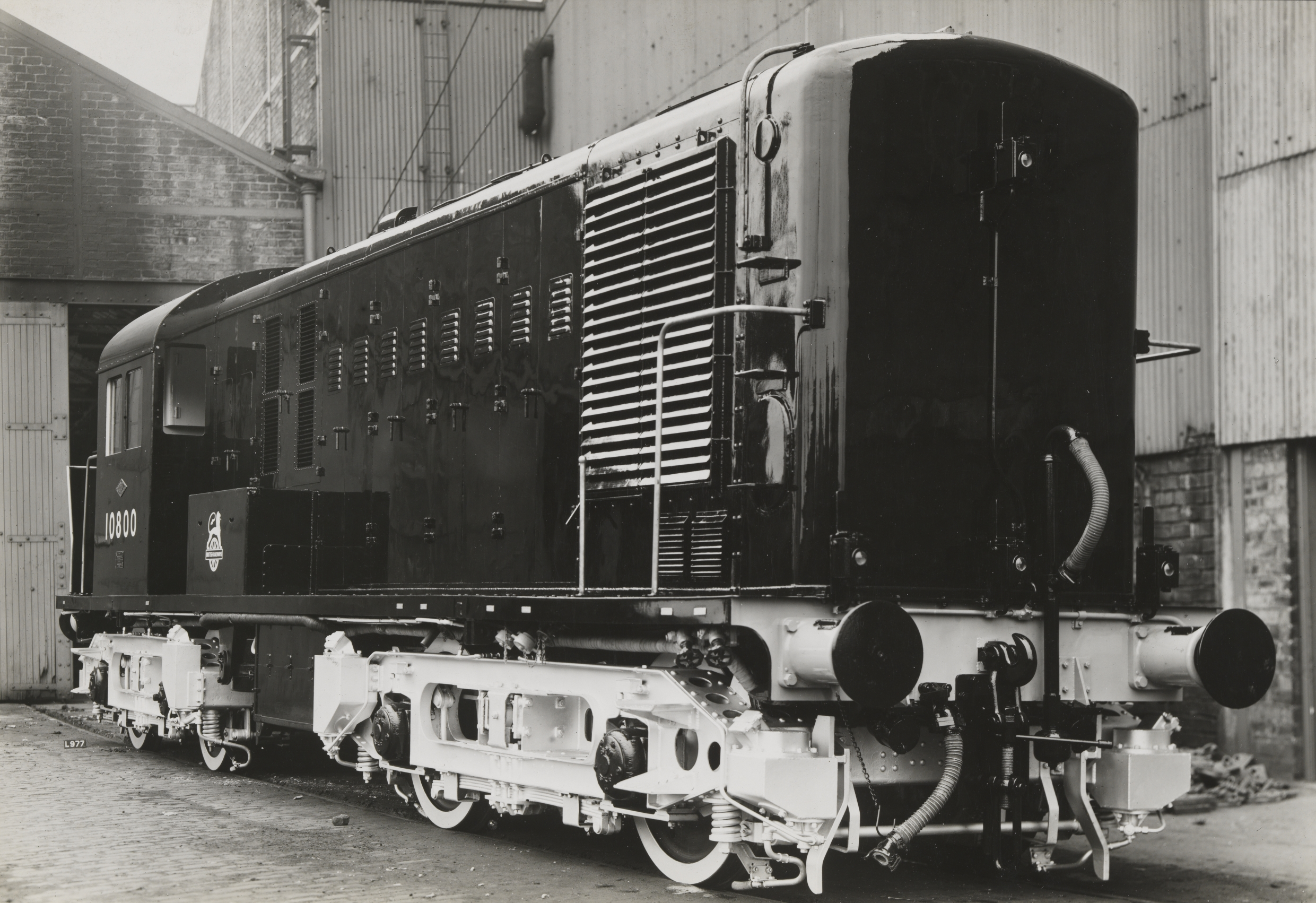
British Railways (BR) 10800 ordered previously in 1946 for London Midland & Scottish Railway (LMSR).

The design drew heavily upon North British's earlier prototype locomotive, designated No. 10800, which had been developed between 1947 and 1950. Having been ordered originally by the London, Midland and Scottish Railway prior to its absorption into BR, No. 10800 was designed for use on branch and secondary lines; according to railway historian Rodger Bradley, this early British diesel locomotive functioned not only as the direct predecessor of the Class 16, but can be more broadly considered to be the forerunner of all BR designs orientated towards this type of work up until the 1980s.

The design also shared some similarities with the contemporary British Rail Class 15; both locomotives adopted the road-switcher layout that had been rapidly becoming the standard approach on the railways of both North America and Australia at the time; they were also both powered by an 800 hp (600 kW) Paxman 16YHXL prime mover. However, the North British design suffered a major setback as a result of external policy decisions; while the company had decided to approach the new era of diesel traction by specialising in hydraulic transmissions in partnership with the West German industrial interest Voith, BR planners had decided to favour electric transmissions instead, putting the firm at a competitive disadvantage to those locomotive builders that had opted for this transmission system.

The locomotive's construction was based on fabricated mainframes that ran the entire length of the locomotive; this practice was inline with traditional steam locomotive designs. According to Bradley, North British found it difficult to translate their steam engineering skills to the newer diesel and electric traction designs. The mainframes were carried on a pair of four‑wheeled bogies and supported the single drivers cab and the superstructure in which the engine and other apparatus was accommodated within. Both the electro‑pneumatic control system and traction motors of the Class 16 were identical to those used on the subsequent British Rail Class 21 locomotive, albeit with the traction motors being downrated to 152 hp and 420 rpm. As they were intended exclusively for hauling freight trains, they were not equipped with train heating boilers.

The original delivery schedule agreed between North British and BR called for the delivery of the first locomotive to occur 21 months from the date of settlement of technical details, resulting in an intended delivery date of August 1957. However, there was considerable complications encountered during the type's construction, which has been typically viewed as not unexpected in light of a general lack of experience with mainline diesel traction on Britain's railways, and as such did not come as a surprise to many officials at the time. The first Class 16 locomotives did not emerge from North British's Queen's Park Works in Glasgow until the summer of 1958, roughly one year behind schedule.

== Operation ==
Upon their completion, all ten Class 16 locomotives (numbered D8400–D8409) were delivered to Devons Road depot, Bow, North-east London on the London Midland Region of British Railways between May and September 1958. There, the type underwent evaluation against the rival designs, but were promptly relocated to nearby Stratford depot on the Eastern Region, where they remained for the rest of their operating lives. The allocation of all ten locomotives in October 1967 was Stratford.

The results of the evaluation were not positive for the type, thus no further Class 16s were ever produced. While the Class 15s also suffered problems with the Paxman engines, these were worse on Class 16 because inadequate ventilation resulted in frequent engine seizures. Another problem was coolant contaminating the fuel oil which happened when the cylinder head broke. They were fitted with a non-standard type of electro-mechanical control equipment (coded "red circle" by BR) which was prone to failure, and they could not operate in multiple with locomotives fitted with the more common electro-pneumatic ("blue star") controls.

== Withdrawal ==
Being both non-standard and fairly unreliable, the locomotives were an obvious candidate for early withdrawal despite barely being ten years old as BR planners were coming to this conclusion. Accordingly, they were all withdrawn between February and September 1968; all ten Class 16s had been cut up for scrap by the end of 1969.

== Models ==
Heljan produced an OO gauge model of the class 16.
