= 3600 class =

3600 class or Class 3600 may refer to:

- CFL Class 3600, electric locomotives
- GWR 3600 Class, 2-4-2T steam locomotives
- Queensland Railways 3500/3600 class, electric locomotives
