= SNCF CC 14000 =

French class of electric locomotives

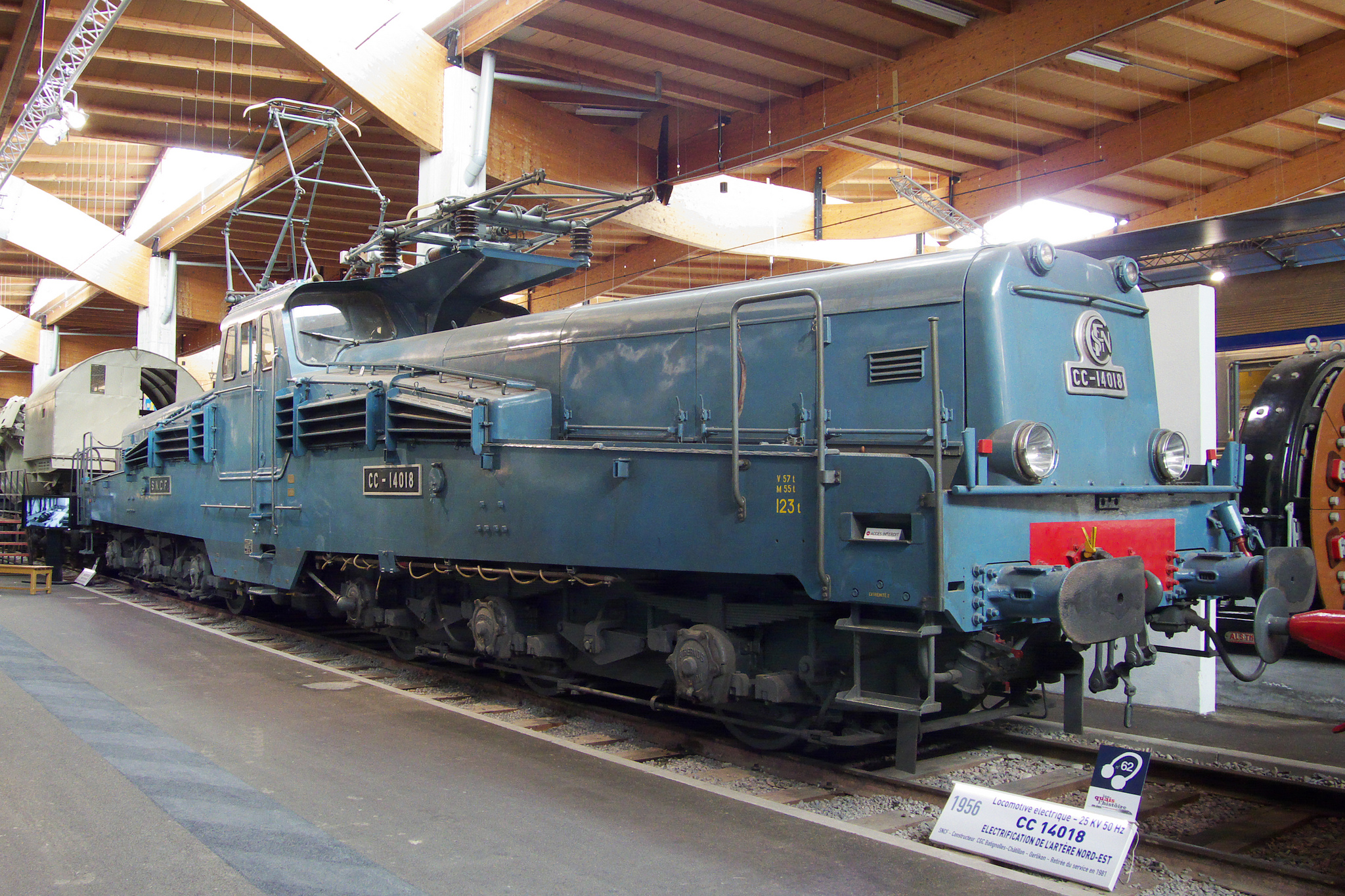
Type and origin
- Power type: Electric
- Builder: CGCL-Oerlikon
- Build date: 1955-1959
- Total produced: 20
Specifications
- Configuration
  - UIC: Co′Co′
- Gauge: 1,435 mm (4 ft 8 1/2 in)
- Wheel diameter: 1.1 m (3 ft 7 in)
- Wheelbase: 9.51 m (31 ft 2 in)
  - Bogie: 2.335 m (7 ft 7.9 in)
- Length: 18.89 m (61 ft 11 3/4 in)
- Loco weight: 125 tonnes (123 long tons; 138 short tons)
- Electric system/s: 25 kV 50 Hz AC
- Current pickups: Pantograph, 2 off
- Traction motors: 6 FD 680 engines 940 V three-phase
Performance figures
- Maximum speed: 60 km/h (37 mph)
- Power output
  - Continuous: 2,640 kW (3,540 hp)
Career
- Operators: SNCF
- Number in class: 20
- Numbers: CC 14001 – CC 14020
- Nicknames: 'Fers à repasser' (Flatirons)
- Retired: 1981

The Class CC 14000 were electric locomotives operated by SNCF in France. They were one of four classes, together with the BB 12000, BB 13000 and CC 14100 classes, that formed an experimental group for studying the practicality of the new French 25 kV 50 Hz AC electrification. It was used in freight service along the Lille – Thionville line. They were nicknamed Fer à repasser (electric irons).

== History ==
In this heavily industrialized area of the country with steep grades, the railway would pull heavy freight trains along the North-East line using SNCF 150.X steam locos, often requiring pusher locomotives to help move the trains along. The SNCF wanted to use only one locomotive on these trains and began studying the use of electric locomotives on the line.

=== 25 kV 50 Hz electrification ===
Around 1950, France began a program of electrification with 25 kV at the 'industrial' frequency of 50 Hz. An experimental program was begun with four similar locomotive designs, one from each maker of electrical equipment, to find the best system. Investigating the electrification of the Lille – Thionville line, the CC 14000 were part of an order for 85 electric locomotives in 1952, each using a different system: five BB 12000 in a mono-continuous format with ignitron rectifiers, fifteen BB 13000 with direct motors, twenty four-phase CC 14000 and sixty-five CC 14100 with single phase-continuous rotating units. The project was very successful, with 150 locomotives ordered in 1954 amongst the BB 12000, BB 13000, CC 14000 and CC 14100 series. The various locomotive types were used in experimenting with different ways of transforming current flowing from the traction network through transformers and rectifiers to the traction motors. As a result, the success of this trial led the SNCF to electrify its remaining lines, decided as being both economical and future-friendly. The 14000s used a rather complex electric motor, prone to a multiplicity of various (mostly minor) breakdowns, yet frustratingly difficult enough to repair (one author explaining the breakdowns were suicide-inducing).

In 1952, orders for 85 locomotives were placed: five BB 12000, fifteen BB 13000, twenty CC 14000, sixty five CC 14100.

== Design and Technical Details ==
The locomotive captured 25 kV from the catenary, directing the electricity into the Oerlikon-built, three-phase squirrel cage electric motors without collectors that required only minimal maintenance. The 25 kV powers the primary transformer (located in lower center of the locomotive), reducing the current to 1,100 V which is then directed to a frequency converter which varies the current directed to the traction motors from 0 to 135 Hz.

Like the CC 14100, the CC 14000 used a rotary converter. The extra weight of this equipment, compared to the BB 12000 and BB 13000, required extra axles to reduce individual axle load and so they were of C-C arrangement rather than B-B. However, this increased the pulling power.

The CC 14000 was the design produced by OC Oerlikon. It used three-phase AC traction motors.

== Service history ==
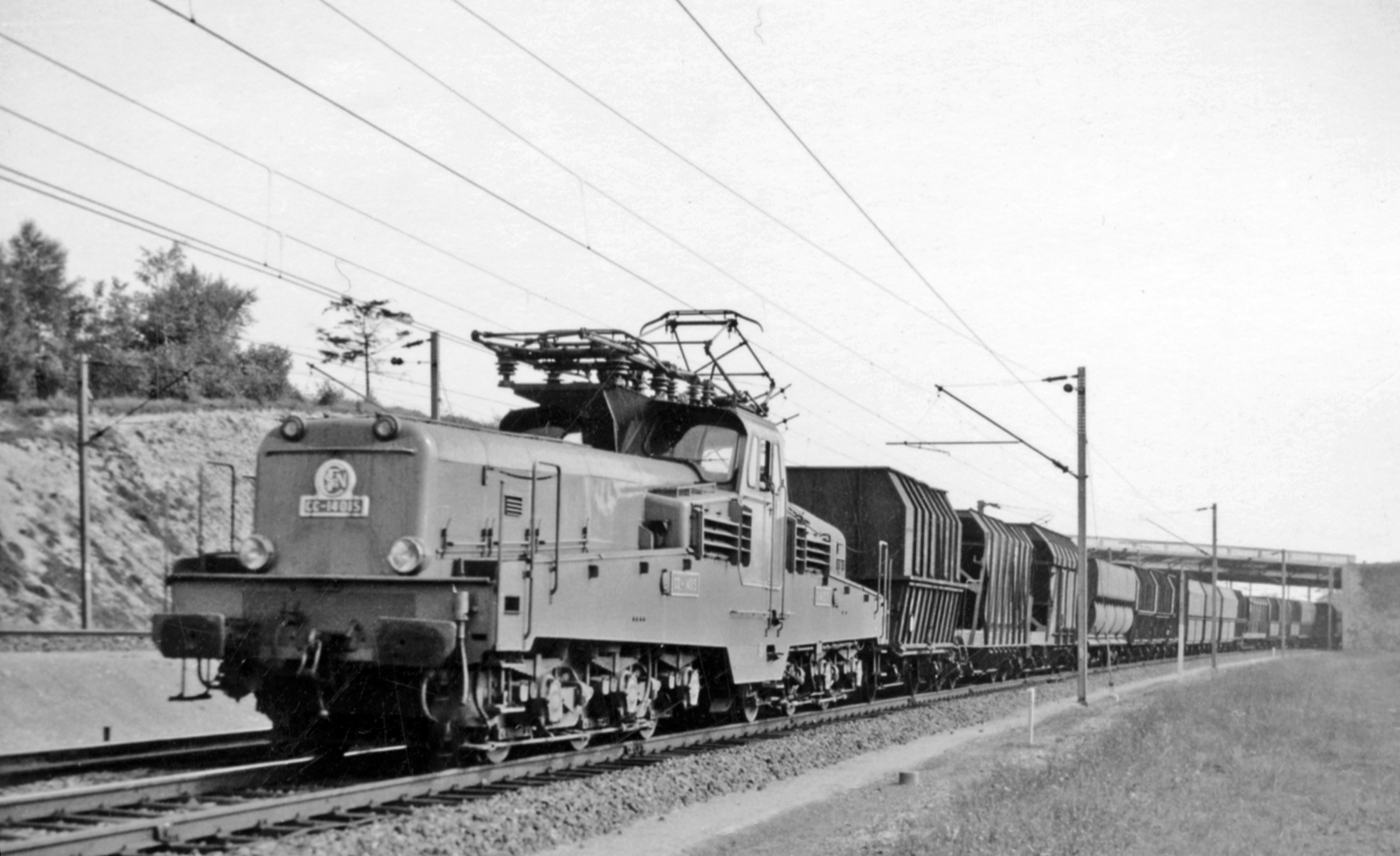
CC 14015 with a northbound mineral train on the Nord main line near Longueau (Somme), 1959

In total, 20 units were built. Their days appeared numbered by the 1970s, with units retired between 1978 and 1981.

=== Preservation ===
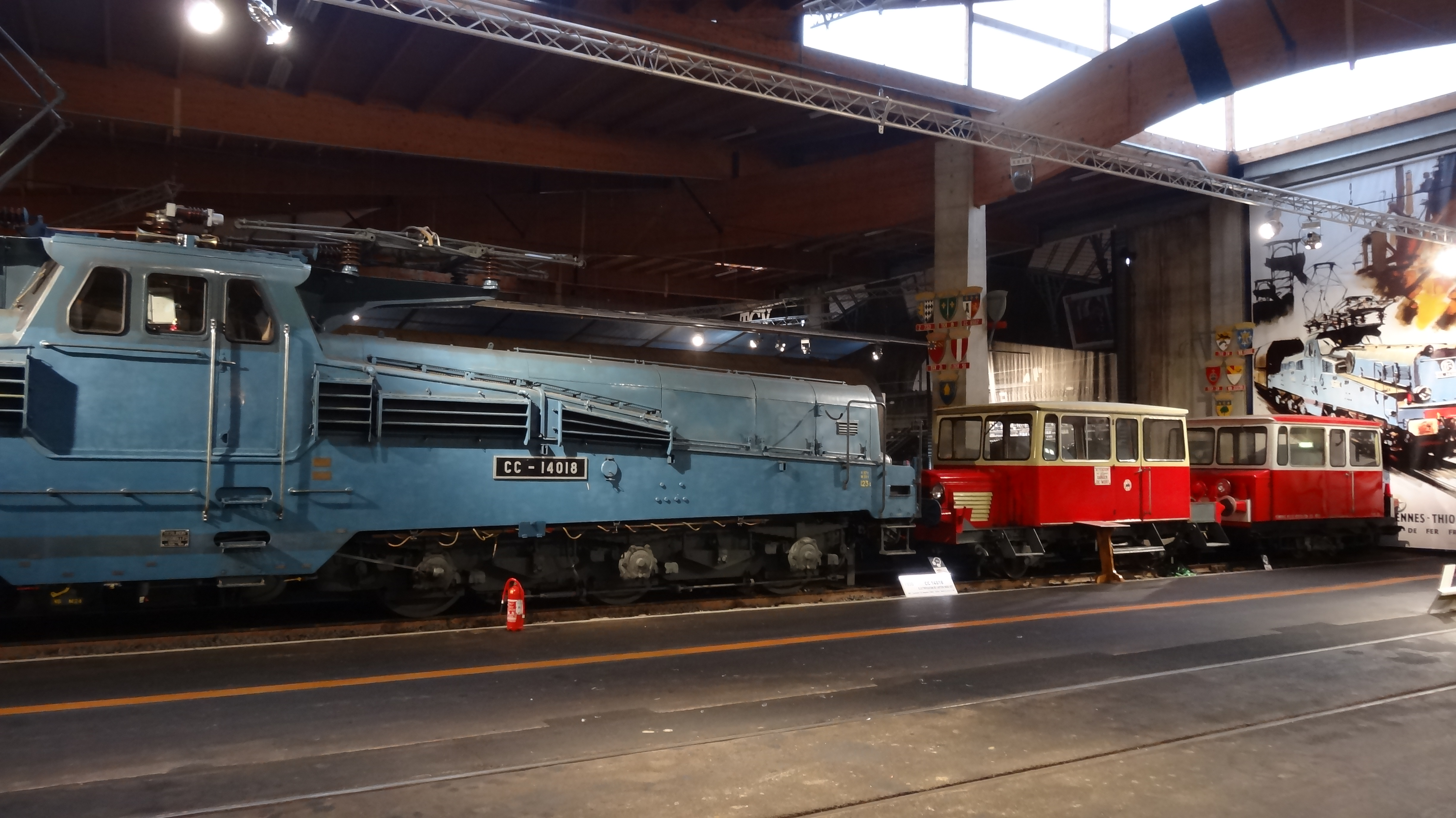
CC 14018 at the Cité du Train

- CC 14018 is preserved at the Cité du Train, Mulhouse.
