= SNCF BB 13000 =

Class of locomotives

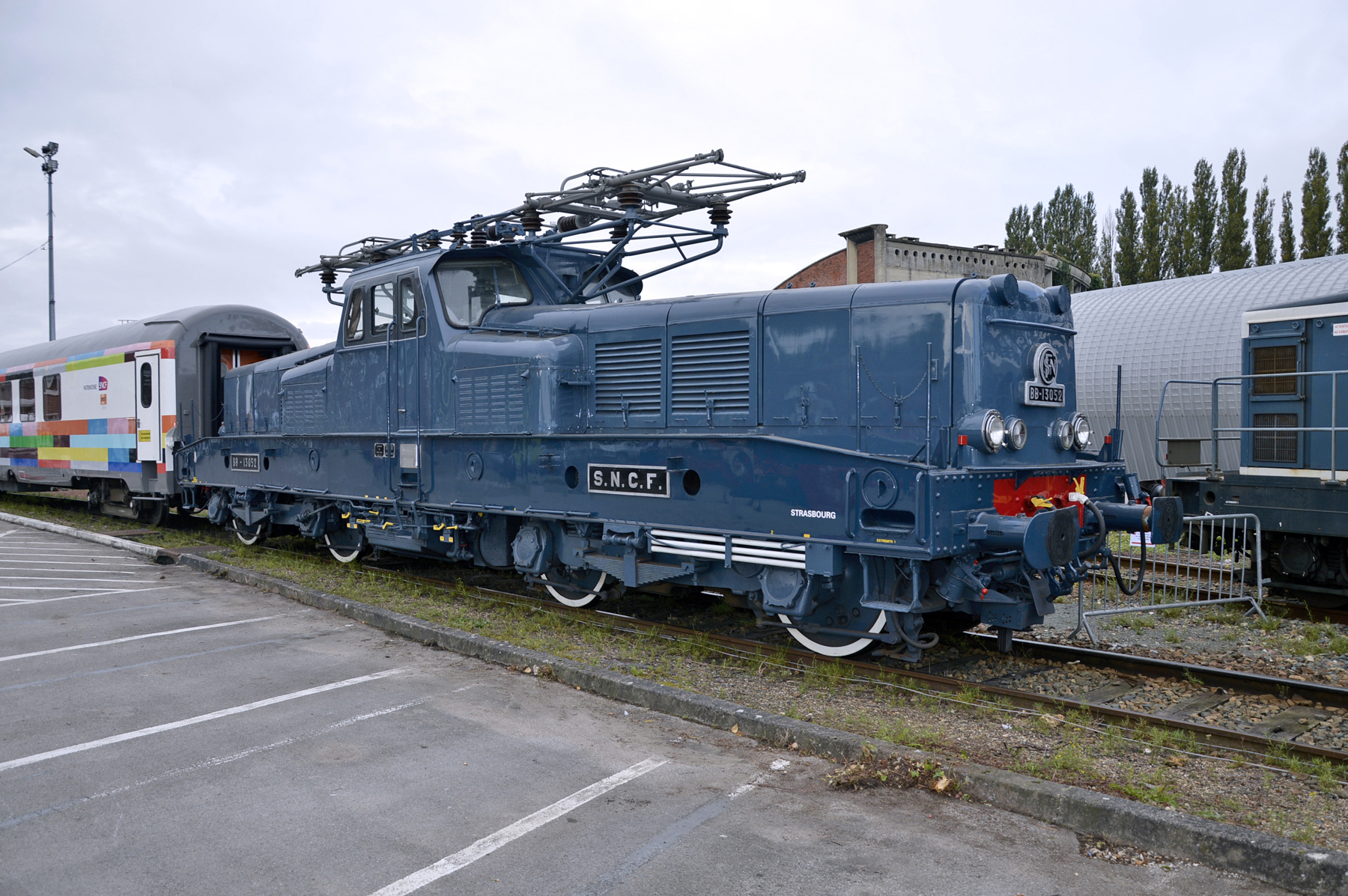
- 13052 preserved at the cité du train à Longueau
Type and origin
- Power type: Electric
- Builder: 1–15: Société des Forges et Ateliers du Creusot - Jeumont; 16–24: SFAC - SW - Fives-Lille - Jeumont; 25–36: SLM - Oerlikon; 37–44: SLM - Brown Boveri; 45–49: SLM - Sécheron; 50–53: Fives-Lille - Jeumont
- Build date: 1954–1961
- Total produced: 53
Specifications
- Configuration
  - AAR: B-B
  - UIC: B′B′
- Gauge: 1,435 mm (4 ft 8 1/2 in)
- Length: 15.2 m (49 ft 10 3/8 in)
- Loco weight: 85 tonnes (84 long tons; 94 short tons)
- Electric system/s: 25 kV 50 Hz AC
- Current pickups: Pantograph, 2 off
- Traction motors: MS 62 260 V 50 Hz single-phase, 4 off
Performance figures
- Maximum speed: 104 km/h (65 mph)
- Power output
  - Continuous: 2,005 or 2,134 kW (2,689 or 2,862 hp)
Career
- Operators: SNCF
- Number in class: 53
- Numbers: BB 13001 – BB 13053
- Nicknames: 'Fers à repasser' (Flatirons) 'Trancheur de jambon' (bacon slicers)
- Retired: 1994
- Preserved: 2

The BB 13000 class were electric locomotives operated by SNCF in France. They were one of four classes, together with the BB 12000, CC 14000 and CC 14100 classes, that formed an experimental group for studying the practicality of the new French 25 kV 50 Hz AC electrification.

== 25 kV 50 Hz electrification ==
The standard French electrification system before WWII was 1,500 V DC, beginning with locomotives such as the 2BB2 400. Post-WWII, France occupied the south-west of Germany and the Höllentalbahn. This line had been electrified with one of the first systems to use 50 Hz, the standard commercial distribution frequency, rather than the lower 16 2/3 Hz AC frequency previously required for railway traction motors in Europe. The Höllentalbahn used a voltage of 20 kV.

There was much interest post-war in using the 'industrial' frequency of 50 Hz and supplying the railways from the now established national systems of electricity generation, rather than requiring an isolated supply network for railways alone. The first French 50 Hz AC line, the Aix-les-Bains to Annemasse line, was in the Haute-Savoie, using a small quantity of experimental motive power. It began at 20 kV in 1951, as for the Höllentalbahn, but in 1953 the voltage was raised to 25 kV. As this was successful, a second 25 kV electrification of 'la Transversale Nord-Est', the 300 kilometres (190 mi) Valenciennes-Thionville line between Thionville and Valenciennes, was tried. This carried three express trains and a hundred freight trains each day, with gradients of up to 1:90. It was significantly a mineral line, bringing coal from the mines of the North to the ironworks of the Lorraine.

To investigate the best system for taking the industrial frequency line current and delivering it to the traction motors, four similar classes of locomotive were constructed, each using a separate technique. One class, the BB 12000, was to be geared fast enough for express passenger services at 120 km/h (75 mph), the others for mixed-traffic or freight. In 1952 orders for 85 locomotives were placed: five BB 12000, fifteen BB 13000, twenty CC 14000, sixty five CC 14100.

== Design ==
The four classes each took a different approach to the use of the AC supply current. The first, the BB 12000, used DC traction motors with ignitron rectifiers; the BB 13000 used new 50 Hz AC traction motors; the CC 14000 used DC traction motors with rectification by rotary converters and the CC 14100 used three-phase AC traction motors, again with rotary converters. The first two classes were of B′B′ layout with two four wheel bogies and a separate traction motor for each axle. As the axles were mechanically coupled by gearing though, they were classified as B′B′ rather than Bo′Bo′. Owing to the greater weight of the rotary converters, the 14000 and 14100 had a Co′Co′ layout with extra axles to carry their weight without increasing the axle load.

The BB 13000 system was designed by Jeumont-Schneider. The 25 kV line current was regulated by an autotransformer then transformed by the main transformer to 750 V AC. This secondary current drives the four single-phase traction motors (one per axle) connected in parallel. Motor speed was controlled by resistor and capacitor shunts at low speeds, resistor and inductor shunts at high speeds.

This AC motor system did not have the advantages of the traction control of the BB 12000 series and their DC motors with precise control from the ignitron phase control. It was found that although the AC motor system was initially simpler to build as it did not need rectifiers, it was not so well-suited to low speed and accelerating from frequent stops, and so it was generally restricted to longer non-stop mainline services. Once silicon rectifiers became available to replace the ignitrons, as had been used on the last of the BB 12000, this became the dominant way to build all AC electric locomotives for decades.

The 'Jacquemin' bogie designs were taken from the SNCF BB 9003, but shortened and simplified as the locomotives were of lower speed. This bogie used two separate traction motors with cardan shaft connection to the wheels, rather than the previous French 'dancing ring' design. As these bogies mechanically coupled the two motors, they are classed as a B′B′ arrangement, rather than Bo′Bo′.

The body style was a steeplecab with a single 'monocabine' central control cab and long, low bonnets at each end. The single cab design was chosen because previous experience had suggested that providing duplicated control gear at the ends of the locomotive was the least reliable part of an electric locomotive, and this way only one set might be needed, with direct access to it. However this simplicity also prevented the locomotives being connected in multiple. The driver was also better protected in case of accident. The two diamond pantographs required more space than the cab roof and so were supported on two distinctive cantilevered platforms, ahead and behind the cab. The steeplecab and its overhanging pantograph platforms gave them the nickname of 'flatirons'. Some drivers also knew them as 'trancheur de jambon' from the control wheel's resemblance to that of a bacon slicer.

== Service history ==
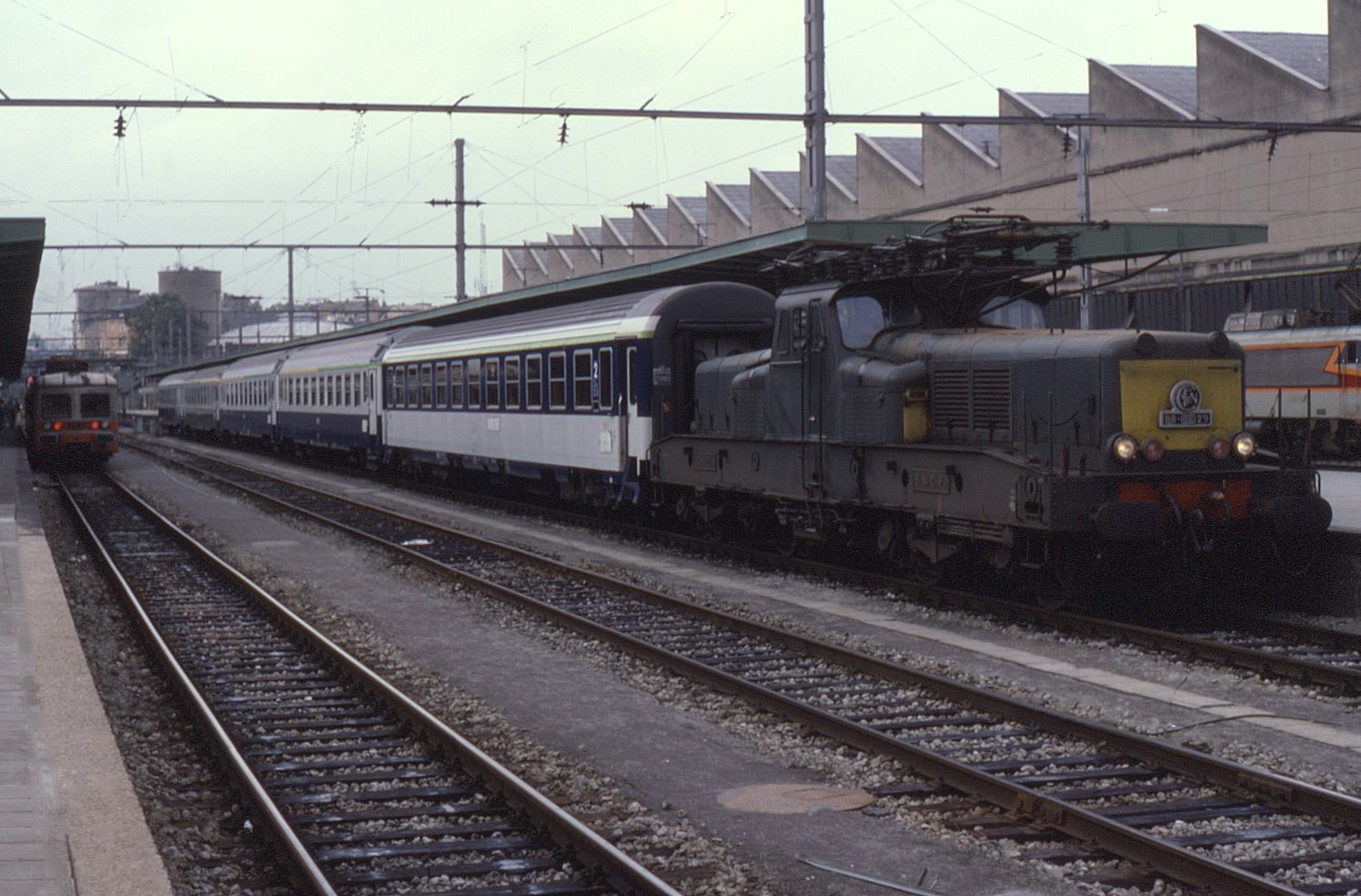
BB 13029 at Luxembourg in 1987

Both the BB 12000 and BB 13000 classes had cramped cabins and relatively poor braking. The BB 12000 were clearly electrically superior though. The BB 13000 class began to be withdrawn in the 1980s and the last operated in January 1994.

=== Preservation ===
Two are preserved as static exhibits

- BB 13044: Centre de la Mine et du Chemin de Fer at Oignies
- BB 13052: Cité du train at Mulhouse
