= Diesel locomotives of British Rail =

British Rail operated a large number of different diesel locomotive types. The majority of these were built between 1955 and 1968.

Many classes were rushed into service as part of the 1955 Modernisation Plan, but poor reliability and a rapid decline in rail transport meant that some would have very short service lives.

== Pre-nationalisation diesels ==
Other countries, particularly the United States, had started introducing diesel locomotives in large number from the 1930s onwards. All the pre-grouping companies experimented with them, but none produced them in large numbers. The LMS made the largest strides by starting a successful series of diesel shunting locomotives, the successors of which are still in service as the Class 08.

The LMS also experimented with mainline locomotives, with their 10000 and 10001 type being the first to enter mainline service in the country.

== Early BR diesel locomotives ==
- British Rail 10100
- British Rail 10800
- British Rail Class D16/2
