= Fenman =

Overview
- Service type: Passenger train
- First service: 1949
- Former operator: British Rail

Route
- Termini: London Liverpool Street; 1949–1969 Hunstanton; 1969–current King's Lynn
- Service frequency: Daily

The Fenman was a named passenger train operating in the United Kingdom.

== History ==
The Fenman was introduced by British Rail in Summer 1949.

Hunstanton station was closed in 1969 and the service was shortened to terminate and start at King's Lynn. The Fenman continued to operate as a named train until the cessation of through trains in the late 1980s.

The name was revived for a short time on completion of electrification to King's Lynn in the summer of 1992, and the recommencement of through trains to London, this time to Kings Cross, by Network SouthEast, using by Class 317 Electric Multiple Units.

In 2018 the Fenman is still being run by Greater Anglia as the 06.17 from King's Lynn to London Liverpool Street, returning at 17.07 from London Liverpool Street to King's Lynn.

== Operation ==
Initially the service was booked for haulage by LNER Thompson Class B1 locomotives between Liverpool Street and Ely, with a Claud Hamilton taking over further north.

On 15 June 1953 the 6:55 am departure from London Liverpool Street broke in two at Bethnal Green between the second and third coaches.

With dieselisation the service was taken over by Class 31s. However while new the Mirrlees engines proved unreliable and breakdowns were not uncommon. On 6 January 1961 D6556 failed on the northbound Fenman and had to be rescued by Class 15 D8236, perhaps the only time that this class hauled a named passenger train. The train then achieved wider notoriety later that month when on 11 January 1961, hauled by Class 31 D5667, it failed on the northbound service just outside Audley End whilst conveying The Queen in the Royal Saloon from London to King's Lynn. The service was rescued by an elderly steam locomotive from Cambridge, and the Queen arrived 59 minutes late into King's Lynn.
