= Stratford TMD =

Former railway depot in London

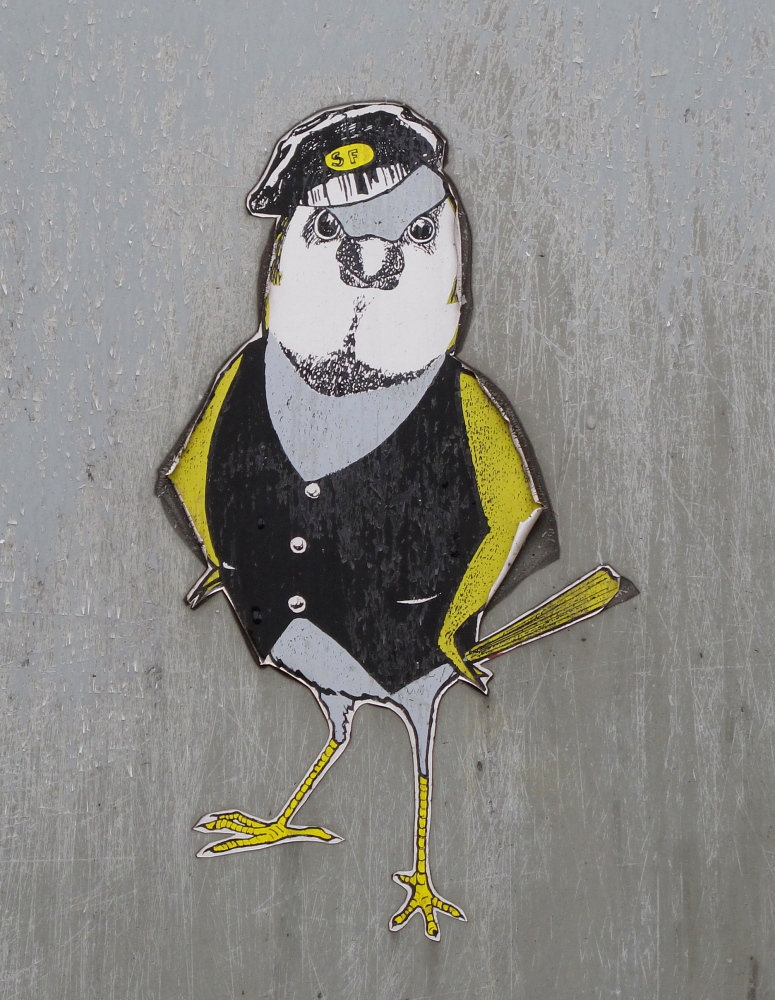
- Stratford's cockney sparrow logo

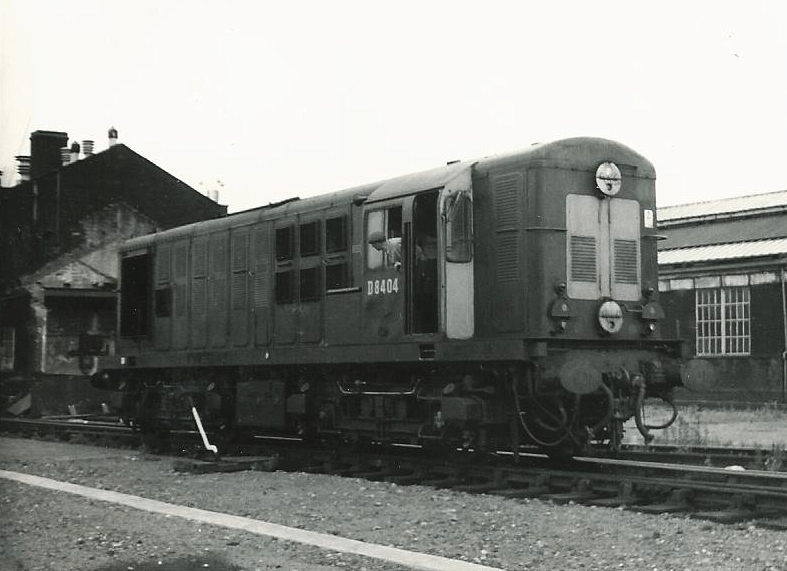
- North British Type 1 D8404 (Class 16) at Stratford in the 1960s
- Interactive map of Stratford TMD

Location
- Location: London, England
- Coordinates: 51.5444°N 0.0081°W
- OS grid: TQ381847

Characteristics
- Depot code: SF (1973-)
- Type: Diesel

History
- Opened: 1840
- Closed: 1997
- Original: N&ER
- Pre-grouping: GER
- Post-grouping: LNER
- BR region: Eastern Region
- Former depot code: STF; 30A (1948-1973); SX (1973)

Stratford TMD was a traction maintenance depot located in Stratford, London, England, close to the Great Eastern Main Line. It was located just west of Stratford station, on a site now occupied by Stratford International station. The depot was, at one time, the biggest on the London and North Eastern Railway with locomotives covering duties from express services to freight workings in London's docks.

Locomotive construction took place at the adjacent Stratford Works and Stratford TMD was initially located on this site in the V between the Lea Bridge and Great Eastern Main Lines. In 1871, the depot moved to the 'teardrop' of lines to the west of the present Stratford Regional station. The depot closed in 2001, as part of the construction of the Channel Tunnel Rail Link.

== History ==
=== Opening and early years ===
Stratford Depot was built by the Northern and Eastern Railway whose line from Stratford to Broxbourne opened in 1840. By 1843, the main building was a 16 road roundhouse which eventually became known as the Polygon, with outbuildings including workshops, a blacksmith and saw pits all contained within the shed complex. On 19 February 1846 additional accommodation was authorised, which resulted in completion of the Erecting Shop the following year. It was in 1847 that the Eastern Counties Railway works in Romford were shut and moved to this site. From this time, the accommodation grew by accretion so that by 1867 the carriage department - later Stratford Works - was using a building 370 ft by 80 ft (113m by 24m) attached to the north side of the Polygon.

The development of Stratford Depot and Stratford Works are intertwined and as the site developed new sections of the works were opened away from the original shared site that lay between the Great Eastern Main Line and the Lea Valley line.

=== Great Eastern ===
The Great Eastern Railway was formed in 1862 by the amalgamation of several East Anglian Railways.

In the 1860s moves were made to increase the locomotive accommodation with a new shed for forty locos proposed. The cost of the most desirable land and perceived difficulties with alternative sites led to delays, so that it was not until 1871 that land to the west of the existing shed was made available and erection of the new building commenced. During construction the Engineer reported on 30 August 1871 that "during a gale on 24th instant both the gable ends blew down", and the "New Shed" opened later that year, retaining its epithet throughout its life.

In 1877 the Jubilee shed (named after Queen Victoria's jubilee was opened. This was a straight-through shed (engines could enter and leave from either end) and with capacity for 130 engines.

In 1917 during World War I the site was bombed by a Zeppelin and one driver was killed and two others injured. Three engines were also damaged by other bombs.

==== L P Parker ====
In 1920 locomotive superintendent LP Parker wrote about the depot.. Some of the key facts are reproduced below:

There were 550 locomotives allocated to Stratford of which 110 were allocated to sub-sheds (see below). The main line services were dealt with B12 4-6-0 and D15 4-4-0's. Main line freight was in the hands of the J15 class and local freight in and around East London was in the hands of 0-6-0Ts belonging to classes J67, J68 and J69. One of these engines is preserved as part of the national collection at York. Stratford was responsible for all the suburban services working out of Liverpool Street station and these were in the hands of 2-4-2Ts (F5, F6 etc.) and. the N7 0-6-2Ts.

There was a 70-foot turntable installed a few years before Parker's article and part of a re-modelling scheme improving access to the depot. There was also a 65-foot turntable and both were electrically powered.

The locomotive coaling plant was one of the biggest in the country and had opened in 1915. Up to that point all coaling had been done by hand with 36 men being employed on each shift. It is possible that with the demand on men in the war that women may have been employed in this role as they certainly were in some other depots. The provision of the new coaling plant that could see an engine coaled in seconds, was the solution to congestion in the area caused by the long wait for coal.

There were also oil storage tanks on the site as at this time some 30 Great Eastern locomotives were oil fired.

Parker reported some 330 repair staff (115 of which were skilled mechanics) but it is likely that some of these were technically on the works payroll.

A breakdown train was also located at Stratford and its staff lived in nearby company owned flats. A bell from the shed telegraph office was connected to the flats and according to Parker the train could be on its way to an accident site within 30 minutes.

At this time Stratford was responsible for supplying the royal train locomotives that operated between London Kings Cross to Sandringham. The depot usually supplied an immaculately turned out D15 Claud Hamilton 4-4-0 class and at the time of Parker's article Stratford engine fitter Day had been accompanying the royal train for twenty years.

Also on site was an enginemen's dormitory which saw a throughput of some 350 drivers a week mostly from March and Peterborough depots. This facility consisted of 50 cubicles as well as showers, a kitchen and other amenities.

==== Allocation 1922 ====
At the end of 1922 (the last year of the Great Eastern Railway) the shed at Stratford had an allocation of 555 locomotives and was the biggest shed on the Great Eastern system. The allocation consisted of:

| Class (LNER classification) | Wheel Arrangement | Number allocated |
|---|---|---|
| B12 | 4-6-0 | 23 |
| D13 | 4-4-0 | 3 |
| D14 | 4-4-0 | 8 |
| D15 | 4-4-0 | 27 |
| E4 | 2-4-0 | 12 |
| F3 | 2-4-2T | 8 |
| F4 | 2-4-2T | 109 |
| F5 | 2-4-2T | 27 |
| F6 | 2-4-2T | 22 |
| F7 | 2-4-2T | 6 |
| G4 | 0-4-4T | 40 |
| J14 | 0-6-0 | 5 |
| J15 | 0-6-0 | 91 |
| J17 | 0-6-0 | 1 |
| J18 | 0-6-0 | 1 |
| J65 | 0-6-0T | 6 |
| J66 | 0-6-0T | 11 |
| J67 | 0-6-0T | 28 |
| J68 | 0-6-0T | 16 |
| J69 | 0-6-0T | 95 |
| N7 | 0-6-2T | 12 |
| Y4 | 0-4-0T | 4 |

All locomotives were built by the Great Eastern Railway.

The extensive suburban services were handled largely by the various F class 2-4-2T locomotives but note the twelve N7 0-6-2T locomotives that were to replace them on these duties from the 1920s onwards although as can be seen below a fair number were still allocated to Stratford in February 1949.

=== London and North Eastern years ===
The London and North Eastern Railway came into existence in 1923.

There were two turntables on the site at this time and in 1924 the one nearest the depot entrance was enlarged to 70 feet to take the largest locomotives.

By this time, the New Shed (270 feet x 100 feet) was where most repairs were undertaken due to the fact that ventilation was so poor. The shed had 6 roads at this time. The 12-car Jubilee Shed (270 feet x 160 feet) was the running shed but by some accounts this was a difficult place to work as well.

In 1929 an automatic boiler wash was supplied to increase turn round time of locomotives in what was otherwise a time-consuming task.

Whilst Great Eastern types provided the majority of the types allocated to Stratford shed, newer LNE types and engines from other LNER constituent companies were allocated there. These included:

- B1 4-6-0
- B17 4-6-0
- K1 2-6-0
- L1 2-6-4T
- J19 0-6-0
- J39 0-6-0

The water supply at Stratford had been a source of concern and this was partially alleviated by the opening of a water softening plant in 1938. The sludge was removed in old engine tenders.

In 1940 the turntable near the entrance of the depot was upgraded from being hand worked to vacuum worked and was further upgraded to be electrically worked in 1946. During World War II both the depot and works complex was hit a number of times during the London Blitz.

During the Second World War a number of US Army Class S160 (USATC S160 Class) 2-8-0s were allocated to the shed during 1943 and 1944 in the run up to the invasion of Europe.

=== BR Years ===
In 1948 Stratford depot became the responsibility of British Railways following nationalisation.

In the early years of British Rail Stratford shed was host to visiting Southern Railway Battle of Britain class 4-6-2 locomotives before the introduction of the Britannia class. In the early 1950s. the opening of the Ford factory in Dagenham saw the depot finding it difficult to attract labour - a problem that continued throughout the fifties and, despite dieselisation, into the 1960s.

In February 1948 the locomotive allocation totalling 414 locomotives was as follows:

| Railway Company/Class | Wheel Arrangement | Number Allocated |
|---|---|---|
| LNER B1 | 4-6-0 | 8 |
| GER B12 | 4-6-0 | 39 |
| LNER B17 | 4-6-0 | 7 |
| GER D15 | 4-4-0 | 2 |
| GER D16 | 4-4-0 | 3 |
| GER F4 | 2-4-2T | 12 |
| GER F5 | 2-4-2T | 23 |
| GER F6 | 2-4-2T | 12 |
| NER G5 | 0-4-4T | 1 |
| GER J15 | 0-6-0 | 33 |
| GER J17 | 0-6-0 | 10 |
| GER J20 | 0-6-0 | 9 |
| LNER J39 | 0-6-0 | 29 |
| GNR J50 | 0-6-0T | 7 |
| GER J65 | 0-6-0T | 1 |
| GER J66 | 0-6-0T | 2 |
| GER J68 | 0-6-0T | 15 |
| GER J67/J69 | 0-6-0T | 48 |
| GN K2 | 2-6-0 | 16 |
| GER N7 | 0-6-2T | 124 |
| LNE V1 | 2-6-2T | 9 |
| LNE V3 | 2-6-2T | 3 |
| LNE Simplex Y11 | 0-4-0T | 2 |

KEY: GER - Great Eastern Railway, GNR - Great Northern, LNER - London North Eastern Railway NER - North Eastern Railway

As a result of war damage and general wear and tear, the mechanical coaler was starting to become uneconomic. A replacement was mooted in 1955 but never built and the monstrous edifice of the old coaler lasted until the end of steam and was demolished in 1963.

==== 1959 allocation ====
Although modernisation started in 1955, by December 1959 there were still a considerable amount of steam locomotives allocated to Stratford:

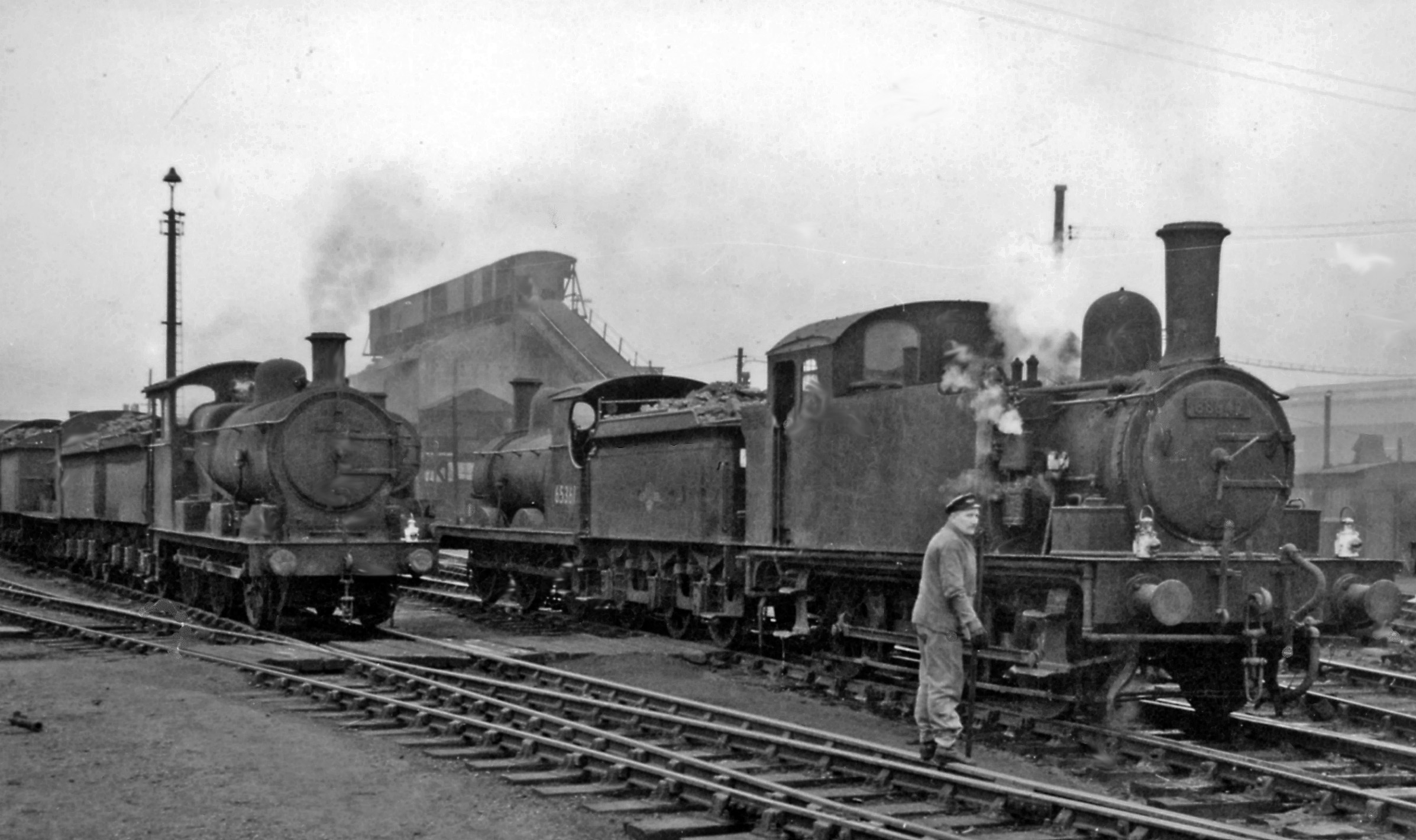
Pictured in 1961 at Stratford were Hill J68 0-6-0T No. 68642 of 1912 (driver adjacent), then Holden J15 0-6-0 No. 65361 of 1885; on the left is Holden J17 0-6-0 No. 65507 of 1901

| Railway Company/Class | Wheel arrangement | Number allocated | Traffic |
|---|---|---|---|
| BR Britannia | 4-6-2 | 1 | Express Passenger |
| LNER B1 | 4-6-0 | 6 | Express Passenger |
| LNER B17 | 4-6-0 | 3 | Express Passenger |
| GER N7 | 0-6-2T | 66 | Local Passenger |
| LNER L1 | 2-6-4T | 19 | Local Passenger |
| LNER V1 | 2-6-2T | 3 | Local Passenger |
| LNER V3 | 2-6-2T | 4 | Local Passenger |
| GER J15 | 0-6-0 | 3 | Freight |
| GER J17 | 0-6-0 | 8 | Freight |
| LNER K1 | 2-6-0 | 7 | Freight |
| GNR K3 | 2-6-0 | 4 | Freight |
| GNR K5 | 2-6-0 | 1 | Freight |
| WAR DEPARTMENT | 2-8-0 | 10 | Freight |
| BR Class 4 | 2-6-0 | 3 | Freight/Mixed |
| LMS 4 | 2-6-0 | 6 | Freight/Mixed |
| LMS 3F Jinty | 0-6-0T | 3 | Freight/shunting |
| GER J68 | 0-6-0T | 7 | Freight/shunting |
| GER J69 | 0-6-0T | 16 | Freight/shunting |
| GNR J50 | 0-6-0T | 16 | Freight/shunting |

KEY: GER - Great Eastern Railway, GNR - Great Northern, LNER - London North Eastern Railway NER - North Eastern Railway LMS - London Midland Scottish BR - British Railways

In December 1959 the diesel allocation at Stratford consisted of 96 locomotives of 11 different classes:

| BR Class | Wheel arrangement | Number allocated | Traffic |
|---|---|---|---|
| 01 | 0-4-0 Diesel Mechanical | 4 | Shunting |
| D1/3 | 0-4-0 Diesel Mechanical | 2 | Shunting |
| 04 | 0-6-0 Diesel Mechanical | 14 | Freight/shunting |
| 08 | 0-6-0 Diesel Electric | 9 | Freight/shunting |
| 10 | 0-6-0 Diesel Electric | 12 | Freight/shunting |
| 11 | 0-6-0 Diesel Electric | 13 | Freight/shunting |
| 15 | Bo Bo Diesel Electric | 2 | Freight |
| 16 | Bo Bo Diesel Electric | 10 | Freight |
| 21 | Bo Bo Diesel Electric | 10 | Mixed |
| 24 | Bo-Bo Diesel Electric | 2 | Mixed |
| 31 | AIA-AIA Diesel Electric | 13 | Mixed |
| 40 | 1Co-Co1 Diesel Electric | 5 | Express Passenger |

By January 1963 Stratford's allocation of steam locomotives was down to a single member of Class B1, no. 61144.

The class 01 and 04 locomotives were all shunting engines and were replaced by the Class 03 locomotives during the 1960s. the Class 10 and 11 shunters were replaced by further Class 08 locomotives. The Class 15 and 16 engines were generally employed on local freight workings but as traffic to London Docks disappeared, these locomotives were deemed surplus and withdrawn. The Class 21 locomotives were notoriously unreliable and were dispatched back to Scotland (they had been built by the North British Railway Company in Glasgow) after an ignominious start to their career. The Class 24 and Class 31s were employed on mixed traffic (i.e. both freight and passenger workings) and the former were re-allocated to the London Midland region. Further Class 31s were allocated to Stratford during the 1960s.

After the withdrawal of the Class 15 locomotives, three British Rail Class 20 were allocated to Stratford for station pilot duties at Liverpool Street station. These were later replaced by Class 08 locomotives but the tradition of a clean smart engine was maintained until the end of station pilot duties in the 1980s.

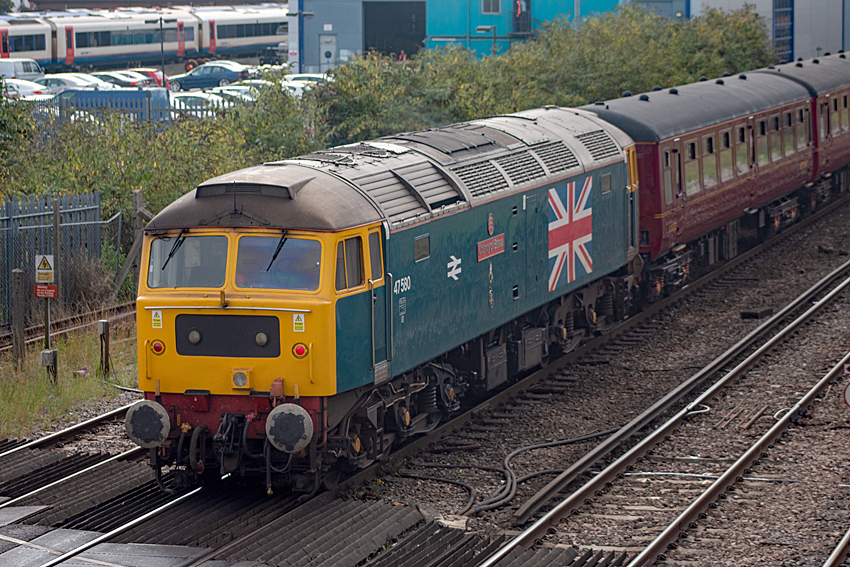
47580 County of Essex restored to Stratford Jubilee livery

The Class 40 locomotives were delivered brand new to Stratford and allocated to main line express duties. These were replaced in the 1960s by Class 37s which in turn were replaced by Class 47s with the Class 37s being used in more of a freight role. In 1977 two Stratford Class 47s were turned out with silver roofs and Union Jack decorations to celebrate the silver jubilee of Queen Elizabeth the second. This move was in the face of strict British Rail guidelines but proved so popular that soon other locomotives were adorned with silver roofs.

In the 1980s Stratford locomotives were also recognisable by a Cockney Sparrow symbol.

The Class 47s were displaced by the electrification of the main lines to Cambridge and Norwich in the mid 1980s, when Class 86 locomotives allocated to Norwich Crown Point took over operation of express services on the Great Eastern Main Line. The Cambridge line was served by Electric Multiple Units.

In the late 1980s a number of withdrawn British Rail Class 33 locomotives were stored at the depot.

The following diesel classes were allocated to Stratford engine shed.

- British Rail Class 01
- British Rail Class 03
- British Rail Class 04
- British Rail Class 05
- British Rail Class 08
- British Rail Class 10
- British Rail Class 11
- British Rail Class 15
- British Rail Class 16
- British Rail Class 20
- British Rail Class 21
- British Rail Class 24
- British Rail Class 31
- British Rail Class 37
- British Rail Class 40
- British Rail Class 47

==== Rail Privatisation ====
The privatisation of the railways in April 1994 saw Stratford depot taken over by English Welsh & Scottish.

==== Closure ====
The depot was closed in 2001 with the site being used for the construction of the new international station on High Speed One. A new diesel depot was opened at nearby Temple Mills but this only lasted a few years as changes to the freight market saw the depot closed. It was demolished and replaced by Orient Way Carriage Sidings (themselves the replacement for Thornton Fields Carriage sidings which has been developed as part of the 2012 Olympic site). In 1997 the final allocation was:

| BR Class | Wheel arrangement | Number allocated |
|---|---|---|
| 08 | 0-6-0 Diesel Electric | 5 |
| 31 | AIA-AIA Diesel Electric | 2 |
| 37 | Co-Co Diesel Electric | 7 |
| 47 | Co-Co Diesel Electric | 13 |

In 2004 preserved locomotive 31271 was named Stratford Depot 1840 - 2001 and is based at the Midland Railway Trust, Butterley.

== Operations ==
Stratford had a number of sub-sheds including in 1959, Walthamstow Wood Street, Enfield Town, Chelmsford, Epping, Ilford and Brentwood.

=== Routes worked ===
The following routes were worked by Stratford men. These may have varied from year to year and are not specific to any one era.

==== Main Lines ====
- London to Norwich
- London to Harwich
- London to Kings Lynn
- London to Clacton and Walton
- Norwich to Ely via Thetford
- Temple Mills to March and Whitemoor via Ely
- Ipswich to Cambridge via Bury St Edmund's
- Cambridge to March via Swavesy

==== Branch Lines and secondary routes ====
- Chingford

Lea Valley Lines including the branches to Enfield Town, Hertford East, Palace Gates and the Southbury Loop to Cheshunt Inner suburban trains to Ilford, Romford and Shenfield Shenfield to Southend Victoria Wickford to Southminster Romford to Upminster Stratford to North Woolwich and Camden Road

==== Inter Regional and Cross London ====
Willesden Sudbury sidings Cricklewood Brent sidings Cricklewood to Acton Wells via Dudding Hill

Old Kew and Feltham

Acton and Reading

Hither Green, Norwood and Bricklayers Arms

==== Shunt turns ====
A shunt turn is where a shunting locomotive is allocated to shunting a yard or set of sidings. Some shunt turns required 'trip' working between yards or sidings. As well as covering the numerous goods yards throughout East London other shunting turns included Liverpool Street station pilots, Thornton Fields Carriage Sidings, Temple Mills yard, Stratford Locomotive Works, Temple Mills Wagon works and London docks.

==== Stratford Works ====
Stratford men worked running in turns for locomotives returned to traffic (or indeed new) at the adjacent locomotive works. In the 1920s tender engines worked to Broxbourne and tank engines to Enfield Town. In the 1950s coaching stock trains were worked to Spelbrook on the main line to Cambridge.

== The site today ==
The site today is occupied by Stratford International station and a shopping centre called Westfield Stratford City. A commemorative plaque was unveiled on the site on 10 July 2012 featuring a 30A shedplate and Stratford cockney sparrow in its design and acknowledging the history of the site. On the day of the unveiling, 200 former Stratford drivers were present at the event and today the position the plaque occupies is the same spot where drivers would sign on for the day.
