= British Rail Class 21 =

Two separate types of diesel locomotive operating in Great Britain have been given the TOPS classification Class 21.

- British Rail Class 21 (NBL) - a class of 58 diesel-electric locomotives produced by the North British Locomotive Company from 1958 to 1960.
- British Rail Class 21 (MaK) - a group of diesel-hydraulic locomotives produced by MaK/Vossloh and used on the Channel Tunnel Rail Link.
