= CFL Class 3600 =

Class 3600
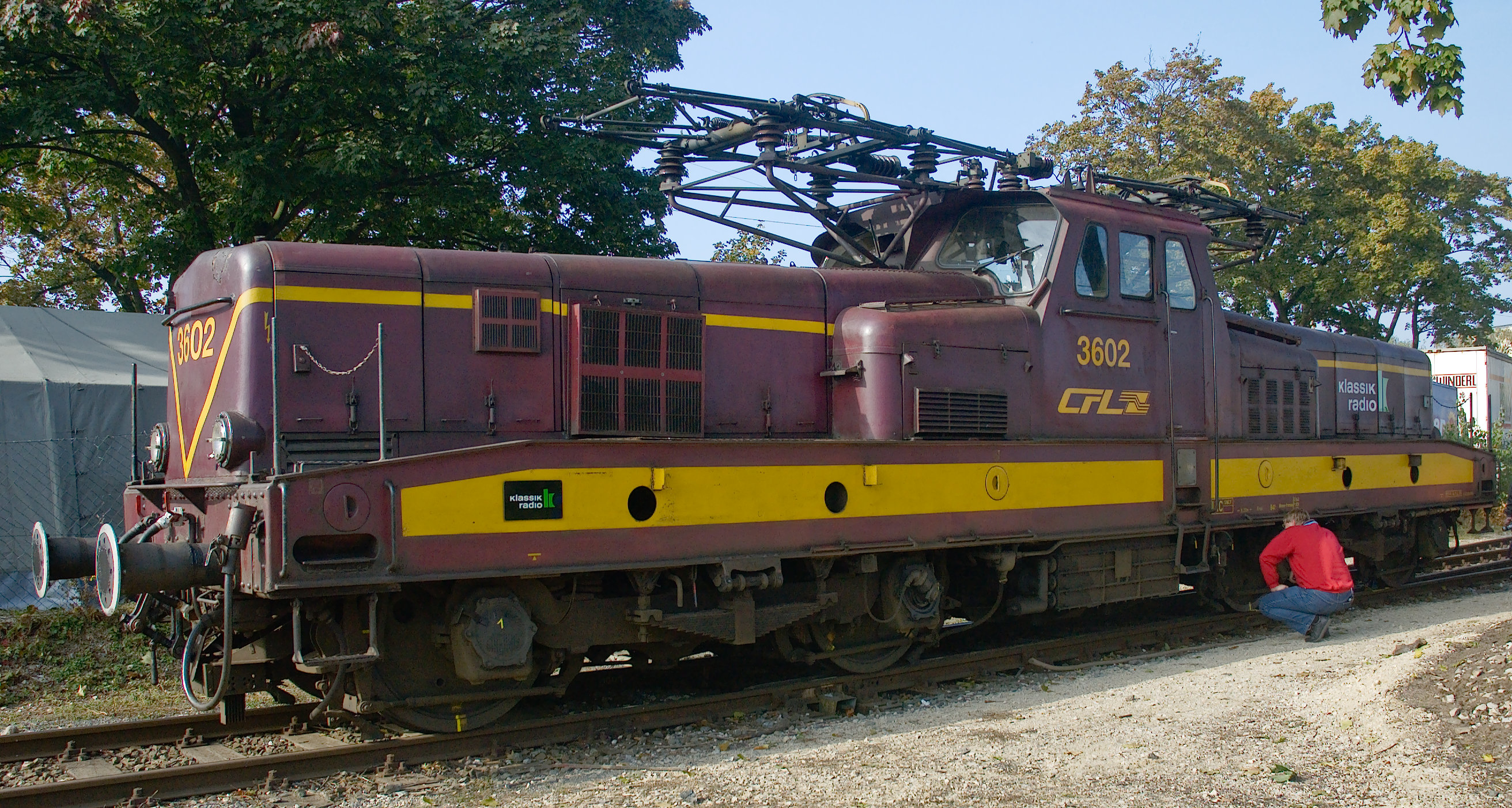
- 3602 in Fürth on 16 September 2007.
Type and origin
- Power type: Electric
- Builder: Le Matériel de Traction Électrique (MTE)
- Build date: 1958–1959
- Total produced: 20
Specifications
- Configuration
  - AAR: B-B
  - UIC: Bo′Bo′
- Gauge: 1,435 mm (4 ft 8 1/2 in)
- Wheel diameter: 1,250 mm (49 in)
- Length: 15.2 metres (49 ft 10 in)
- Axle load: 21 tonnes (21 long tons; 23 short tons)
- Loco weight: 84 tonnes (83 long tons; 93 short tons)
- Electric system/s: 25 kV 50 Hz AC
- Current pickup: Pantograph
Performance figures
- Maximum speed: 120 km/h (75 mph)
- Power output: 2,650 kW (3,550 hp)
- Tractive effort: 186 kN (42,000 lbf)
Career
- Operators: CFL
- Class: 3600
- Numbers: 3601–3620
- Retired: 2005
- Disposition: Disposal/Preservation

Class 3600 are a group of electric locomotives that were operated by Chemins de Fer Luxembourgeois (CFL). They were built to the design of the French BB 12000 class.

These locomotives have lost their duties to the newer class 4000s. Examples are still to be found dumped in yards awaiting their final trip for disposal. Two have been saved:

- 3602 Augsburg Railway Park, Germany
- 3608 in Esch sur Alzette

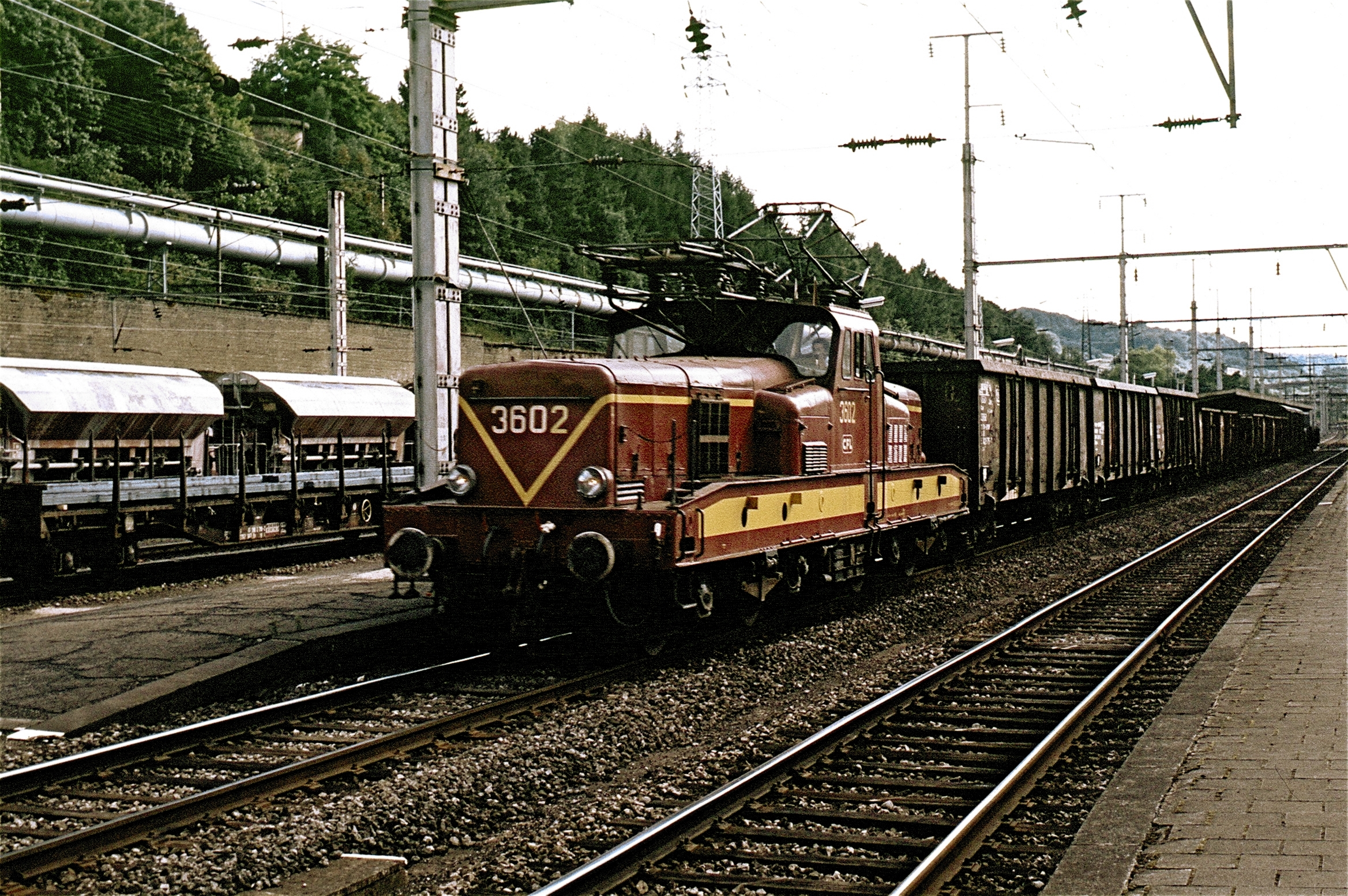
3602 in 1988
