= British Rail Class 15 =

Diesel Electric locomotive designed by British Thompson-Houston

BTH Type 1 British Rail Class 15
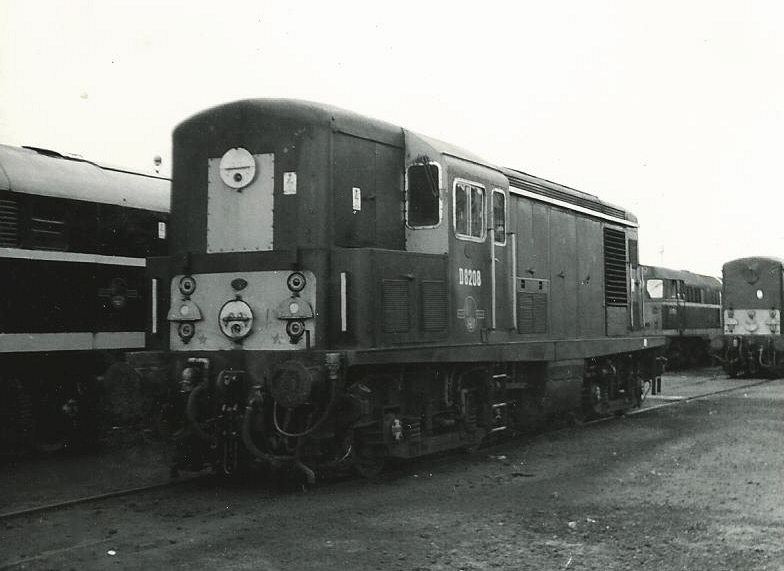
- A BTH Type 1 (later Class 15) at Stratford MPD in 1966
Type and origin
- Power type: Diesel-electric
- Builder: British Thomson-Houston at Yorkshire Engine Company (Initial Batch); British Thomson-Houston at Clayton Equipment Company (Second Batch)
- Build date: 1957–1961
- Total produced: 44
Specifications
- Configuration
  - UIC: Bo′Bo′
  - Commonwealth: Bo-Bo
- Gauge: 4 ft 8 1/2 in (1,435 mm) standard gauge
- Wheel diameter: 3 ft 3 1/2 in (1.003 m)
- Minimum curve: 3.5 chains (70.41 m)
- Wheelbase: 31 ft 0 in (9.45 m)
- Length: 42 ft 0 in (12.80 m)
- Width: 9 ft 2 in (2.794 m)
- Height: 12 ft 6 in (3.810 m)
- Loco weight: 69 long tons (70 t; 77 short tons)
- Fuel capacity: 400 imp gal (1,800 L; 480 US gal)
- Prime mover: Paxman 16YHXL
- Displacement: 78.4 L (4,780 cu in)
- Generator: Main : BTH RTB10858; Auxiliary : BTH RTB7420
- Traction motors: 4 x BTH 137BZ, nose suspended, with single reduction gear
- Cylinders: 16
- Cylinder size: bore: 7 in (178 mm) stroke: 7 3/4 in (197 mm)
- Transmission: Diesel electric
- MU working: ★ Blue Star
- Train brakes: Vacuum
Performance figures
- Maximum speed: 60 mph (97 km/h)
- Power output: Engine: 800 hp (597 kW); At rail: 627 hp (468 kW)
- Tractive effort: Maximum: 37,500 lbf (167 kN)
- Brakeforce: 31 long tons-force (310 kN)
Career
- Operators: British Railways
- Numbers: D8200–D8243
- Axle load class: RA 4
- Retired: 1968–1971
- Disposition: 1 preserved, remainder scrapped

The British Rail Class 15 diesel locomotives, also known as the BTH Type 1, were designed by British Thomson-Houston, and built by the Yorkshire Engine Company and the Clayton Equipment Company, between 1957 and 1961. They were numbered D8200-D8243.

The Class 15 was ordered by British Railways (BR) shortly after the announcement of the 1955 Modernisation Plan, which led to the procurement of a diverse number of diesel locomotives under the 'pilot scheme'. Shortly following the completion of the first locomotive during 1957, its performance was sufficient to justify multiple follow-on orders, leading to a total fleet of 44 locomotives. In service, the type was relatively unreliable, much of this being traceable to its Paxman 16YHXL power unit. Its fortunes were further impacted by inconsistent policy making. During the late 1960s, it was decided to withdraw the Class 15 in favour of the more numerous and successful British Rail Class 20 locomotive, both types having been developed to satisfy the same Type 1 specification. Their final use was as departmental vehicles, coming to an end in the late 1980s. One example has survived into preservation.

== Background ==
In less than a decade following the formation of British Railways (BR), substantial changes were being made. Under the 1955 Modernisation Plan, a long-term strategy of replacing steam locomotives with a combination of diesel locomotives and electric locomotives was adopted, with the former being largely intended as an interim measure for most areas ahead of widespread electrification of trunk routes. There was also a strong political desire to support British manufacturers in transitioning towards the design and production of these favoured forms of traction. Due to a lack of expertise, this often involved the pairing of traditional locomotive manufacturers with various firms within the electrical sector, even though the latter typically had very limited experience of the railways.

In accordance with these policies, BR ramped up its efforts to convert its fleet, placing numerous orders within a short timeframe for diesel locomotives to several different specifications with various manufactures. It placed four separate lots of orders, for a cumulative 44 BTH Type 1 diesel locomotives with the heavy engineering company British Thomson-Houston (BTH). The first batch of locomotives was primarily intended for evaluation purposes, this initiative coming under the remit of BR's pilot scheme.

== Construction ==
While BTH was appointed as the main contractor and was viewed as being capable of designing the type, the company lacked capacity at its facility in Rugby, Warwickshire, and thus was unable to produce the locomotives inhouse. The practical resolution to this was to subcontract both the design and manufacture of the mechanical elements (e.g. running gear, bogies, bodies) to other firms, primarily the Yorkshire Engine Company and the Clayton Equipment Company, neither of which had any experience with main line diesel locomotives.

Accordingly, the design and manufacture of the type was a collaborative effort between these companies. Specifically, while BTH supplied the majority of the electrical equipment, Paxman supplied the power units, Clayton supplied the bogies and superstructure, construction of the frame and final assembly occurred at Yorkshire Engine's Sheffield works, for the initial batch of ten locomotives. However, final assembly was transferred to Clayton for all subsequent batches.

The design of the locomotive was in conformance with the stated requirements listed in the 'Type 1' specification. As such, this led to the inclusion of numerous features such as provisions for operating in multiple with other members of the type. The propulsion system consisted of a single Paxman 16YHXL engine that provided up to 800 hp (597 kW) that, via a diesel-electric transmission, drove four individual DC traction motors. In comparison with a typical locomotive, the design featured a relatively high-speed engine for the era.

During late 1957, the first example of the type emerged. Furthermore, the type was envisioned for serving various types of smaller trains on secondary routes, such as the haulage of local freight and empty coaching stock trains. However, the fortunes of the class were somewhat impacted by the pilot scheme being abruptly terminated amid persistent budgetary shortages.

The performance of the initial batch of 10 locomotives quickly showed the design held promise, leading to repeat orders for 34 more locomotives to be placed soon after their entry into service. These locomotives, numbered D8210–D8243, were constructed at Clayton's facility in Hatton, Derbyshire, were delivered between October 1959 and February 1961.

== Operations ==
=== Introduction ===
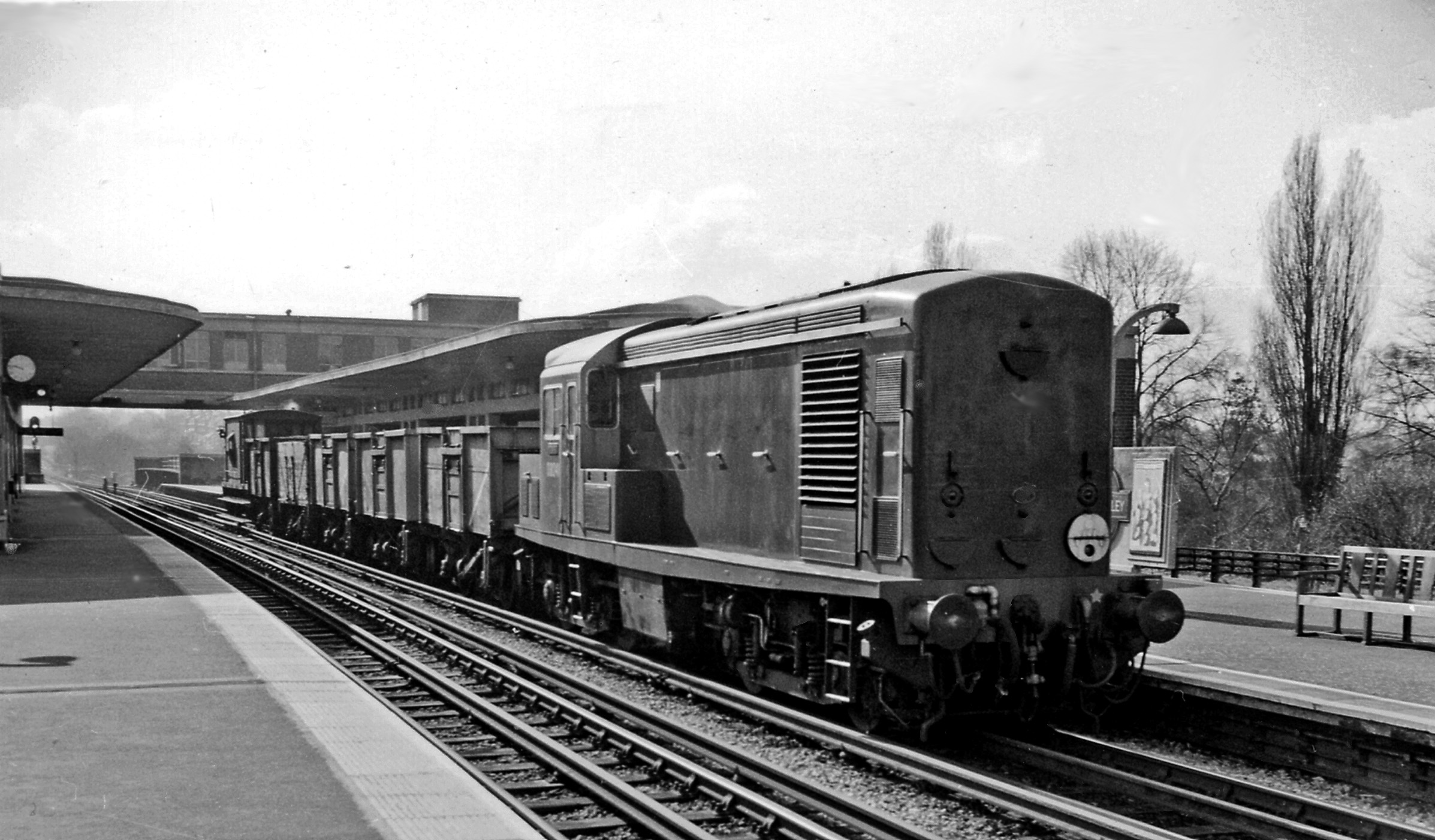
D8241 at East Finchley with local goods train, 1962

Distribution of locomotives, October 1967
British Rail Class 15 is located in Southern England
Code	Name	Quantity
30A	Stratford	28
32B	Ipswich	12
34G	Finsbury Park	4
Total:		44

The first ten locomotives were delivered to the London Midland Region's Devons Road depot in Bow, East London, where they were evaluated against the contemporary North British Type 1 (class 16) and English Electric Type 1 (class 20) designs. Soon, however, the entire class was allocated to depots on the Eastern Region, where they remained until withdrawal. The second block of ten was originally allocated to March depot in East Anglia, however due to the Clean Air Act 1956 the locomotives were quickly re-allocated to East London, allowing the replacement of steam locomotives in that area. Thereafter, the type was allocated exclusively to Stratford, Finsbury Park and Ipswich depots.

Class 15s were generally used on freight and infrastructure operations, and haulage of passenger trains was limited to replacement as a result of failure. An example of such an occurrence was on the northbound Fenman on 6 January 1961 where D8236 hauled the train, including the failed Class 31 D5665, from near Stanstead to Bishop's Stortford where a more powerful replacement took over.

A member of the class also worked as the train ferry shunter at Harwich Town during the 1960s and for a period a Class 15 operated as the station pilot at Liverpool Street station, the last locomotive used being 8234 which was replaced by a Class 08 on 4 October 1971.

=== Problems and impact ===
The Class 15 was troubled by its relatively high level of unreliability, which was largely centred around the type's Paxman engine; as delivered, the engine was found to require excessive maintenance. A series of modifications to the pistons, piston rings and maintenance schedules, and fitting cast iron cylinder heads led to considerable improvements in the engine's reliability, however, it remained a complex V16 for only providing 800 bhp, while the small size of the class bore poorly at a time when the rail network was rapidly contracting. Furthermore, the layout of the locomotive, which positioned its single cab part-way down the body akin to a North American road-switcher, provided the crew with a relatively poor forward visibility in both directions of travel, although this was initially tolerated as it was no worse than the visibility offered by the cab of a steam locomotive.

According to railway author Rodger Bradley, the shortcomings of the Class 15 were not so much attributable to its designers but largely came as a consequence of ill-defined requirements, which can be largely attributed back to moving government policies. Additional factors highlighted by Bradley include a general dependence upon the wider British electrical industry to both design and deliver numerous subsystems that would function sufficiently well upon the often-challenging railway environment, along with radical changes to the national economy during this era had also impacted the type's suitability to these broader circumstances and thus its overall performance. Despite these various issues, the Class 15 can be considered to be more successful than several contemporary Type 1 locomotives, such as the Class 16 and the later Class 17.

=== Accidents and incidents ===
On 21 November 1963, locomotive No. D8221 crashed through buffers whilst shunting at Ipswich engine shed and ended up across Croft Street. After attempts to tow it back onto the track using diesel locomotives failed, it was retrieved using the only steam locomotive in service at Ipswich, which had been retained for carriage heating purposes.

=== Withdrawal ===
Following a persistent decline in freight duties in the London area, in combination with the type being a relatively small and unsuccessful non-standard class, the type was considered to be surplus to requirements by the late 1960s. The ubiquitous British Rail Class 20, which had been developed to meet the same Type 1 specification, was more numerous and had proved to be less troublesome to operate, thus it effectively replaced the type in all operational respects. The type was speedily removed from traffic, being withdrawn from capital stock between April 1968 and March 1971. D8225 was observed operating at Temple Mills as late as 28 March 1971.

After withdrawal 23 of the class were stored at the former Ipswich engine shed during 1971 before being hauled away, generally as part of booked freight trains, for scrapping.

== Conversion ==
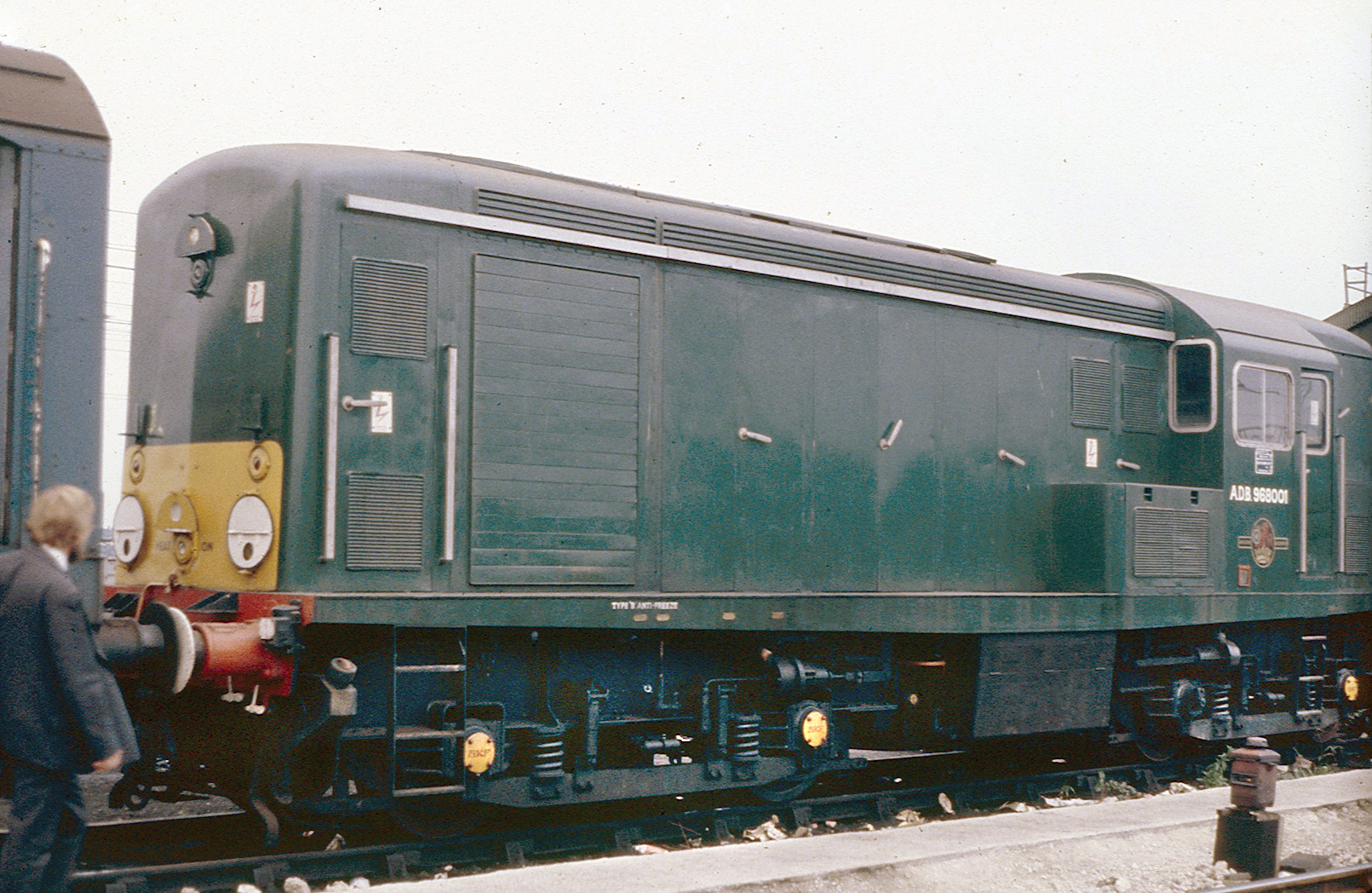
ADB968001 (ex D8233) at Colchester in 1980.

All but four locomotives had been broken up for scrap by the end of 1972. The four Class 15s that survived were used for departmental service for a time, for which they were converted into non-powered electric train pre-heating units based at Doncaster Works. These duties kept the locomotives in active use for another ten years or more, until these final examples were again found to be redundant and finally withdrawn.

Original Number	Departmental number	Location	Withdrawn	Disposal
D8203	ADB968003	Finsbury Park (FP)	1981	Scrapped, 1981
D8233	ADB968001	Finsbury Park (FP)	1982	Preserved
D8237	ADB968002	Finsbury Park (FP)	1982	Scrapped, 1985
D8243	ADB968000	Finsbury Park (FP)	1989	Scrapped, 1991

== Preservation ==
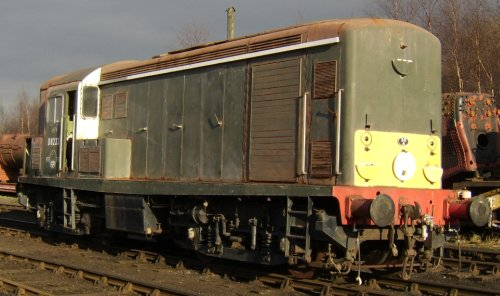
Sole surviving Class 15 no D8233 seen at Baron Street Loco Shed, East Lancashire Railway, 2006

One of the former train heating units, D8233, was purchased for preservation in 1984 and is now the only survivor of the type. It was originally kept at the South Yorkshire Railway in Sheffield, moving in 1986 to the East Lancashire Railway, and in 1988 to the Mangapps Farm Railway, where it remained until 1993. D8233 then moved to Crewe following an agreement with the Waterman Heritage Trust. Since its initial preservation the locomotive had received little work apart from cosmetic attention. Some work was carried out by the Waterman Heritage Trust, however the locomotive's restoration remained dormant until the end of 2005, when a reformed owning group, alongside the WHT, agreed the time was right to accelerate the locomotive's return to service. With an active plan for work agreed, the locomotive returned to the East Lancashire Railway in February 2006, where its restoration to working order is now under way.

== Models ==
A ready to run model in 00 gauge was available from TechCad design based on a hand finished resin shell and powered by a Mashima motor. It was then available from TechCad as a kit, but TechCad have since ceased trading. Since 2010, Heljan have produced an OO gauge ready-to-run model in a variety of liveries. The Heljan model was first announced in 2008 and introduced as D8233 in BR green.

An N gauge kit of a member of the class is available from BH Enterprises, powered by a Graham Farish Class 20 chassis.

An O gauge ready-to-run model was produced by Little Loco Company

== Bibliography ==
- Clough, David N. (2005). "Pilot Scheme Prototypes of Type A/Type 1: BTH D8200 series (later Class 15)". Diesel Pioneers. Ian Allan. pp. 41–45. ISBN 978-0-7110-3067-1.
- Stevens-Stratten, S.W.; Carter, R.S. (1978). British Rail Main-Line Diesels. Shepperton: Ian Allan Ltd. ISBN 0-7110-0617-2.
- Williams, Alan; Percival, David (1977). British Railways Locomotives and Multiple Units including Preserved Locomotives 1977. Shepperton: Ian Allan Ltd. ISBN 0-7110-0751-9.
- British Railways Locoshed Book 1977. Shepperton: Ian Allan Ltd. 1977. ISBN 0-7110-0752-7.
- Sugden, S.A. (April 1994). Diesel & Electric Loco Register (3rd edn). Sheffield: Platform 5. ISBN 1-872524-55-9.
- Grindlay, Jim (2006). British Railways Locomotive Allocations 1948-1968 (Part 6 – Diesel & Electric Locomotives). Troon: Modelmaster Publications. ISBN 978-0-9544264-6-0.
