= SNCF Class CC 14100 =

Class of 101 French 25 kV electric locomotives

SNCF CC 14100
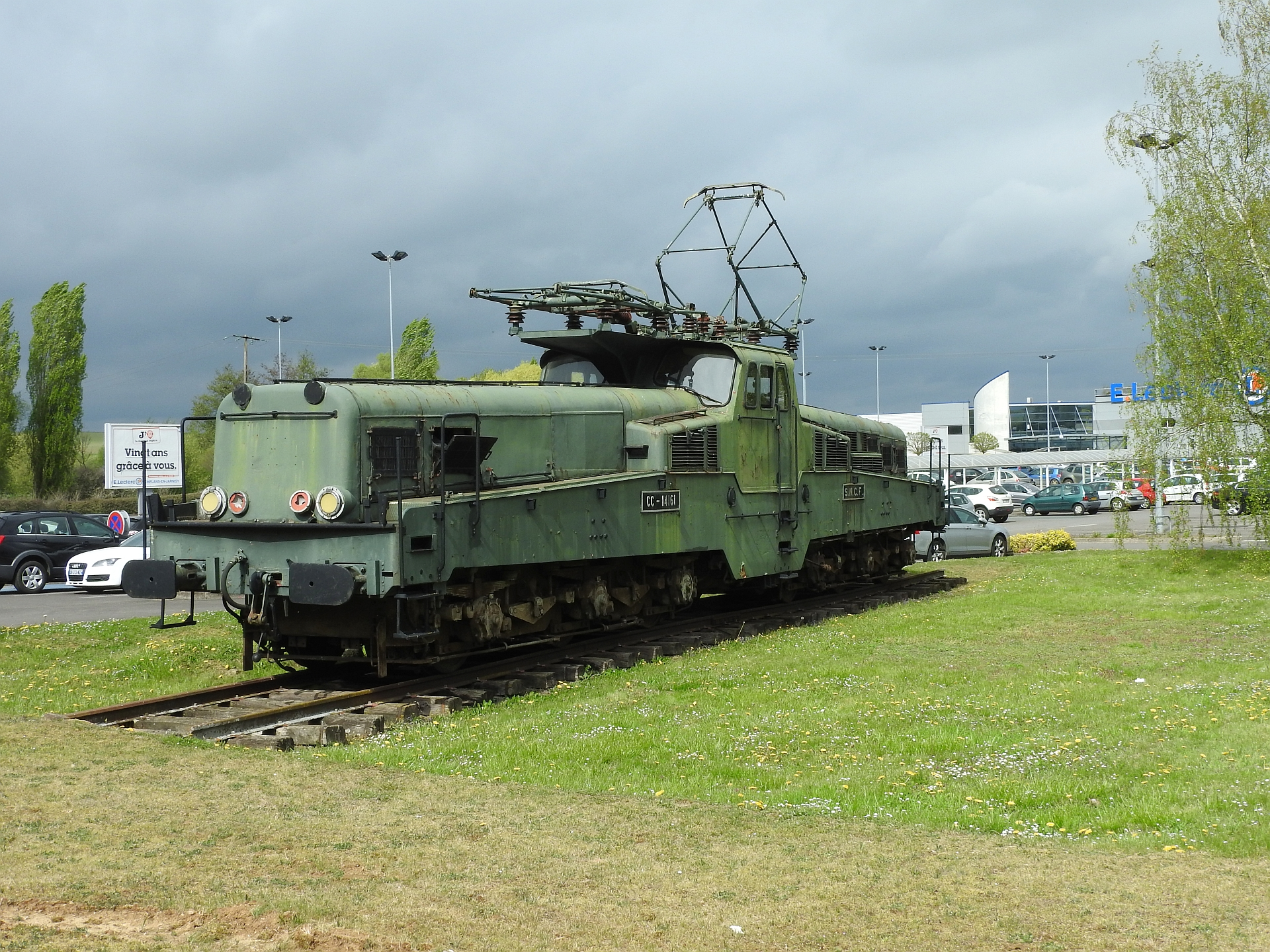
- CC 14161 in original green livery
Type and origin
- Power type: Electric
- Builder: Alsthom
- Build date: 1954–1958
Specifications
- Configuration
  - AAR: C–C
  - Commonwealth: Co-Co
- Gauge: 1,435 mm (4 ft 8 1/2 in) standard gauge
- Wheel diameter: 1,100 mm (43 in)
- Length: 18.89 m (62.0 ft)
- Loco weight: 128 t (126 long tons; 141 short tons)
- Power supply: 25 kV AC
- Electric system/s: Catenary
- Current pickup(s): Pantograph
Performance figures
- Maximum speed: 60 km/h (37 mph)
- Power output
  - Continuous: 2,600 kW (3,500 hp)
- Tractive effort: 422 kN (95,000 lb_{f})
Career
- Number in class: 101
- Numbers: CC 14101–CC 14202
- Nicknames: Fers à repasser (Irons)
- Preserved: CC 14161; CC 14183

The SNCF Class CC 14100 was a class of 25 kV 50 Hz AC electric centre cab locomotives designed to haul heavy freight trains in the northeast of France and cross-border traffic into Luxembourg. A total of 101 locomotives were produced, numbered CC 14101 – CC 14202.

== Service use ==
Introduced at the time when steam traction was being phased out, the torque of these locomotives was exceptional. During tests, a CC 14100 started a train weighing 1,850 tonnes (1,820 long tons; 2,040 short tons) on an 1.1% slope, and a 3,500 tonnes (3,400 long tons; 3,900 short tons) train on a 0.5% slope. Their slow speed of 60 km/h (37 mph) became a liability in later years and by 1986 individual locomotives were being withdrawn as they came due for overhaul or major repairs. The last members of the class survived until 1997, mainly on shunting duties.

== Preservation ==
CC 14161 is on display on a short length of track next to a supermarket car park in Conflans-en-Jarnisy. CC 14183 is at the Carreau Wendel Museum at Petite-Rosselle.
