= British Rail Class D3/14 =

Class of diesel-electric shunting locomotive

LNER DES2 British Rail Class D3/14
Type and origin
- Power type: Diesel-electric
- Builder: London and North Eastern Railway’s Doncaster Works
- Build date: 1947
- Total produced: 1
Specifications
- Configuration
  - Whyte: 0-6-0DE
  - UIC: C
- Gauge: 4 ft 8 1/2 in (1,435 mm) standard gauge
- Wheel diameter: 4 ft 0 in (1.219 m)
- Loco weight: 51.20 long tons (52.02 t; 57.34 short tons)
- Prime mover: Petter SS4
- Traction motors: Brush Traction, 2 off
- MU working: Not fitted
- Train heating: None
- Train brakes: Vacuum
Performance figures
- Power output: Engine: 360 bhp (270 kW)
- Tractive effort: 32,000 lbf (142.3 kN)
Career
- Operators: London and North Eastern Railway, British Railways
- Class: LNER: DES2; BR: DEJ2; later D3/14; later 3/2
- Numbers: LNER: (none); BR: 15004
- Axle load class: Route availability 5
- Retired: September 1962
- Disposition: Scrapped, Doncaster Works

British Rail Class D3/14 was a diesel-electric locomotive built by the London and North Eastern Railway at its Doncaster Works. It had a Petter engine, and Brush Traction electricals. It was absorbed by British Railways on nationalisation, but was withdrawn in the pre-TOPS era.

== History ==
Originally laid down as a D3/9, the frames were moved from Doncaster Works to Brush Traction's Falcon Works in Loughborough for final assembly. It was completed in September 1947 and undertook trials with LNER in November 1947. In January 1948, it was moved to Temple Mills Yard in London for further trials. It was then moved to March Whitemoor Yard. In December 1948, it was returned to Loughborough and was acquired by British Rail upon nationalisation.

In April 1949, it was delivered to March shed. Whilst based at March, it was used on short freight services between Ferme Park and Herne Hill. It moved to Hornsey Depot in December 1951, however it was moved to Crewe Works later that month. It returned to March in January 1952 and returned to Hornsey in around 1955. In January 1957, it worked at Woodford Halse Shed and New England Shed in Peterborough where it remained until withdrawal in October 1962.

Upon withdrawal, it was moved to Doncaster Works, and was finally scrapped in July 1963.

== See also ==
- British Rail 15107
- List of British Rail classes

== Sources ==
- Brush Diesel & Electric Locomotive Works List (reprint ed.). Industrial Railway Society. 1999.
- Ian Allan ABC of British Railways Locomotives (Winter 1962–3 ed.). p. 227.
- Strickland, David C. (1982). Locomotive Directory, every single one there has ever been. Camberley, Surrey: Diesel and Electric Group. p. 62. ISBN 978-0-906375-10-5.
