= J45 =

J45 may refer to:

- Gibson J-45, an acoustic guitar
- Gyroelongated square bicupola
- HMS Ross (J45), a minesweeper of the Royal Navy
- LNER Class J45, a British diesel locomotive class
