= Peter rehra =

A Peter Rehra as commonly seen on village Roads in Punjab. Notice the buffalo in its hold.

A peter rehra, (ਪੀਟਰ ਰੇਹੜਾ) is a type of locally made jugaad vehicle used in rural Punjab and other Northern Indian states. It is, of course, not meant for high-performance, but for sheer economy, as it is easily able to carry twenty to twenty-five adults (plus their luggage), but mostly cannot move at more than 25 km/h. There has been instances when Punjab Police themselves used this to carry a whole Maruti 800 (which they could not drive out of court orders)

It is made by assembling parts. A diesel engine (mostly meant for pumping water) without its pumpset assembly is joined with a framework made of steel angles and wooden planks and completed with four movable wheels. The two front wheels are steerable and the two rear ones are directly attached to the engine via a primitive gear assembly made from old SUV parts.

Though it is not technically recognized by the Government as a legal vehicle, its use is quite common, mainly due to the high demand for public transport and lack of proper bus and train routes, especially to underdeveloped parts of the North Indian provinces.

The name originated from "Petter", a brand of small diesel engines imported to India in early 1960s.

It is also known as gharruka (ਘੜੁੱਕਾ); maruta (ਮਾਰੂਤਾ), which means the male version of the Maruti 800 car by Maruti Suzuki partnership in India; or dhindsa (ਢੀਂਡਸਾ), after Sukhdev Singh Dhindsa, who was a former State Transport Minister of Punjab.
