= Jugaad =

South Asian term describing a creative hack or kludge

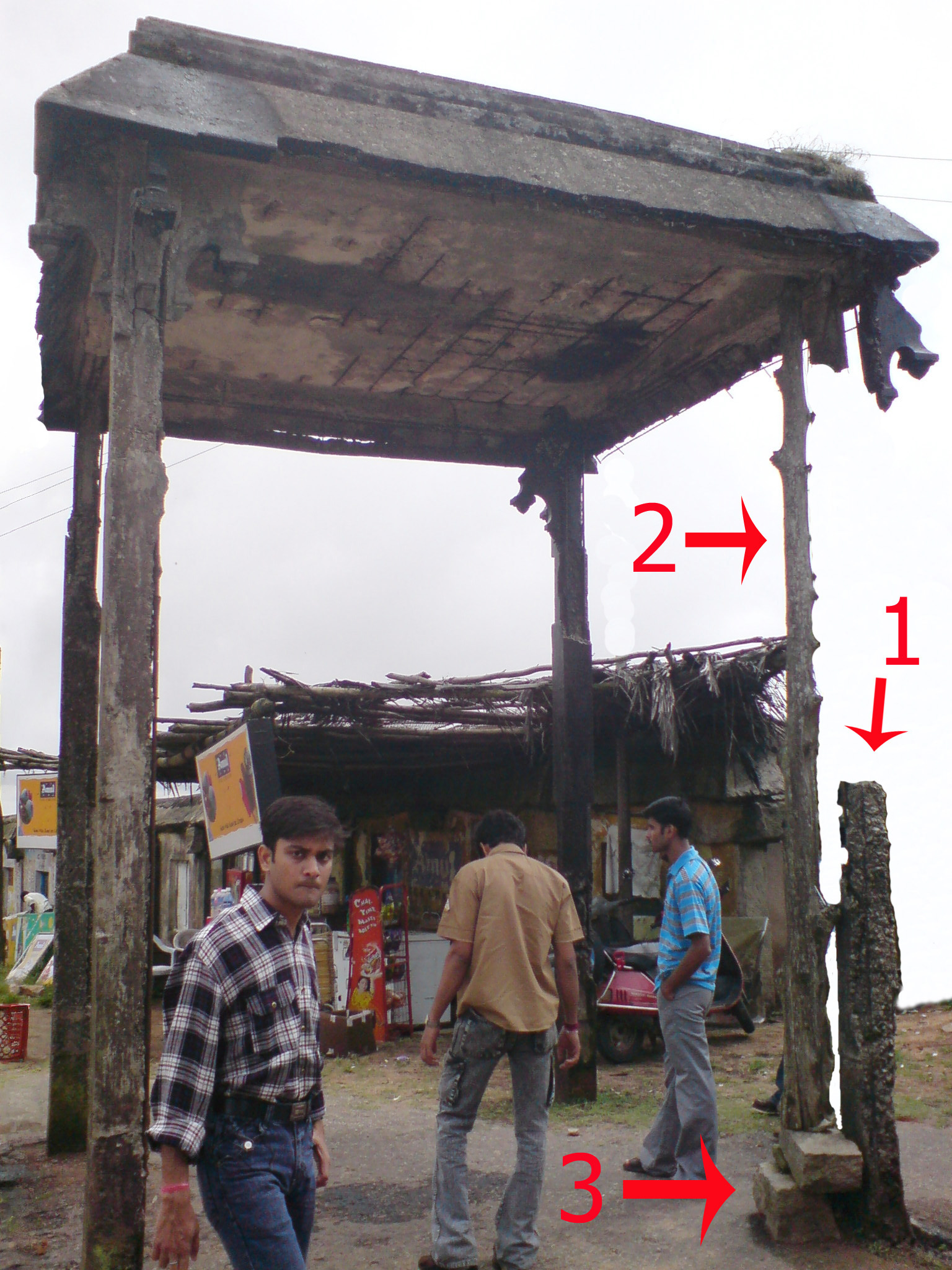
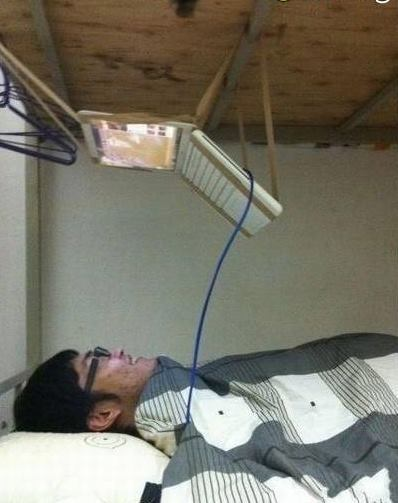
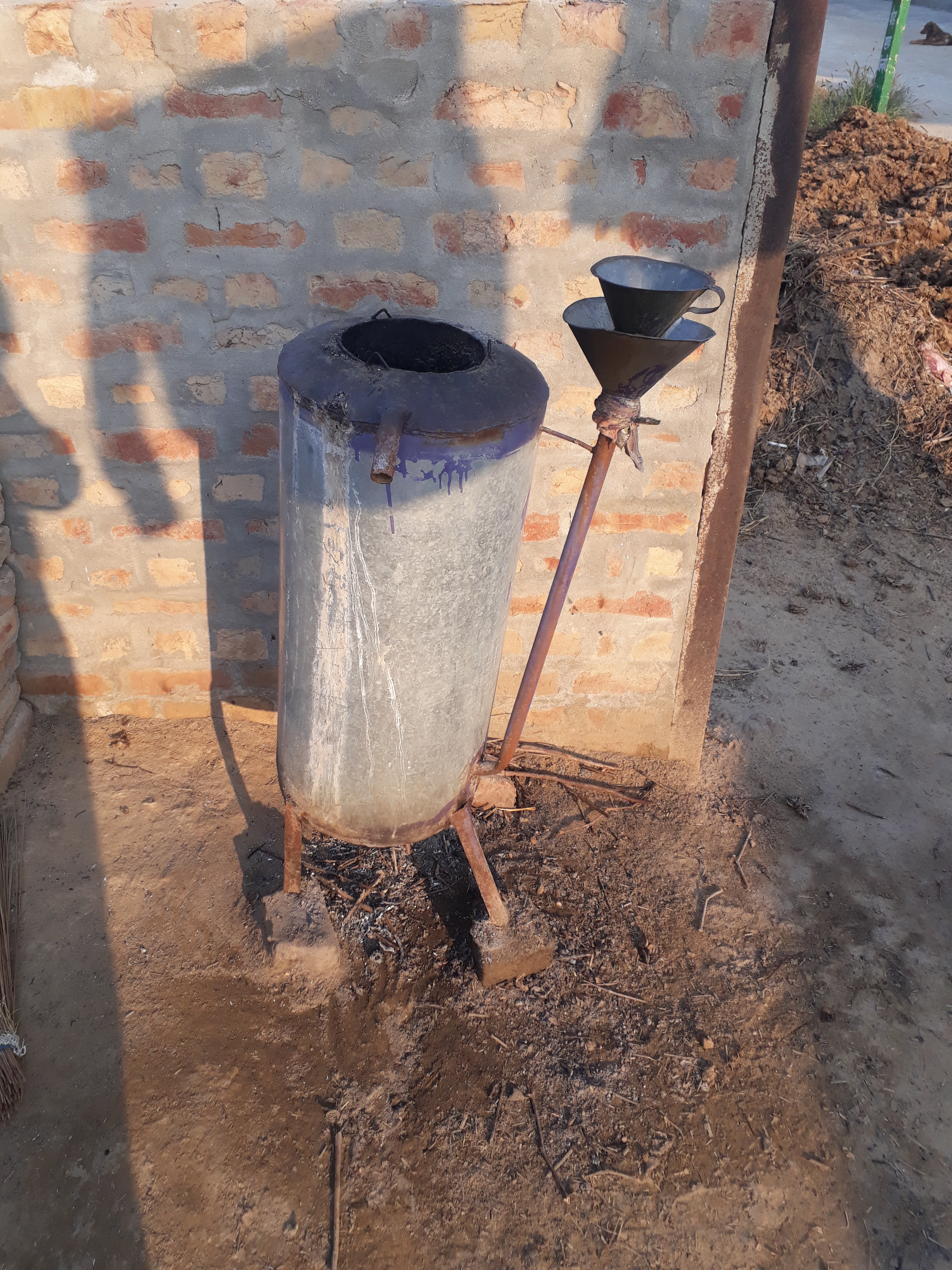
From top left to right: A temporary jugaad improvised repair for a broken support; Improvised ceiling mount for a laptop computer; Jugaad water heater used in villages of Haryana and Punjab in India and Pakistan.

Jugaad or jugaar (Hindi:जुगाड़, Urdu: جگاڑ, Punjabi: ਜੁਗਾੜ, jugāṛ) is a term specifically used in South Asia to describe being resourceful, although other cultures worldwide have terms for the concept. It means using ingenuity to use scarce resources in a clever and unconventional way.

Jugaad is increasingly accepted as a management technique and is recognized all over the world as a form of frugal innovation.According to the analysis, companies like Facebook, GE, Google, PepsiCo, Philips, Renault-Nissan, Siemens, Tata Group and YES BANK in Southeast Asia are adopting jugaad as a practice to reduce research and development costs. Jugaad also applies to any kind of creative and out-of-the-box thinking or life hacks that maximize resources for a company and its stakeholders. Jugaad is however, also argued to be not limited to management circles but rather about infrastructural arrangements deployed by product designers and users that allow for versatility and improvisation of use and repair.

According to author and professor Jaideep Prabhu in the year 2013, jugaad is an "important way out of the current economic crisis in developed economies and also holds important lessons for emerging economies".

== Improvised vehicles ==
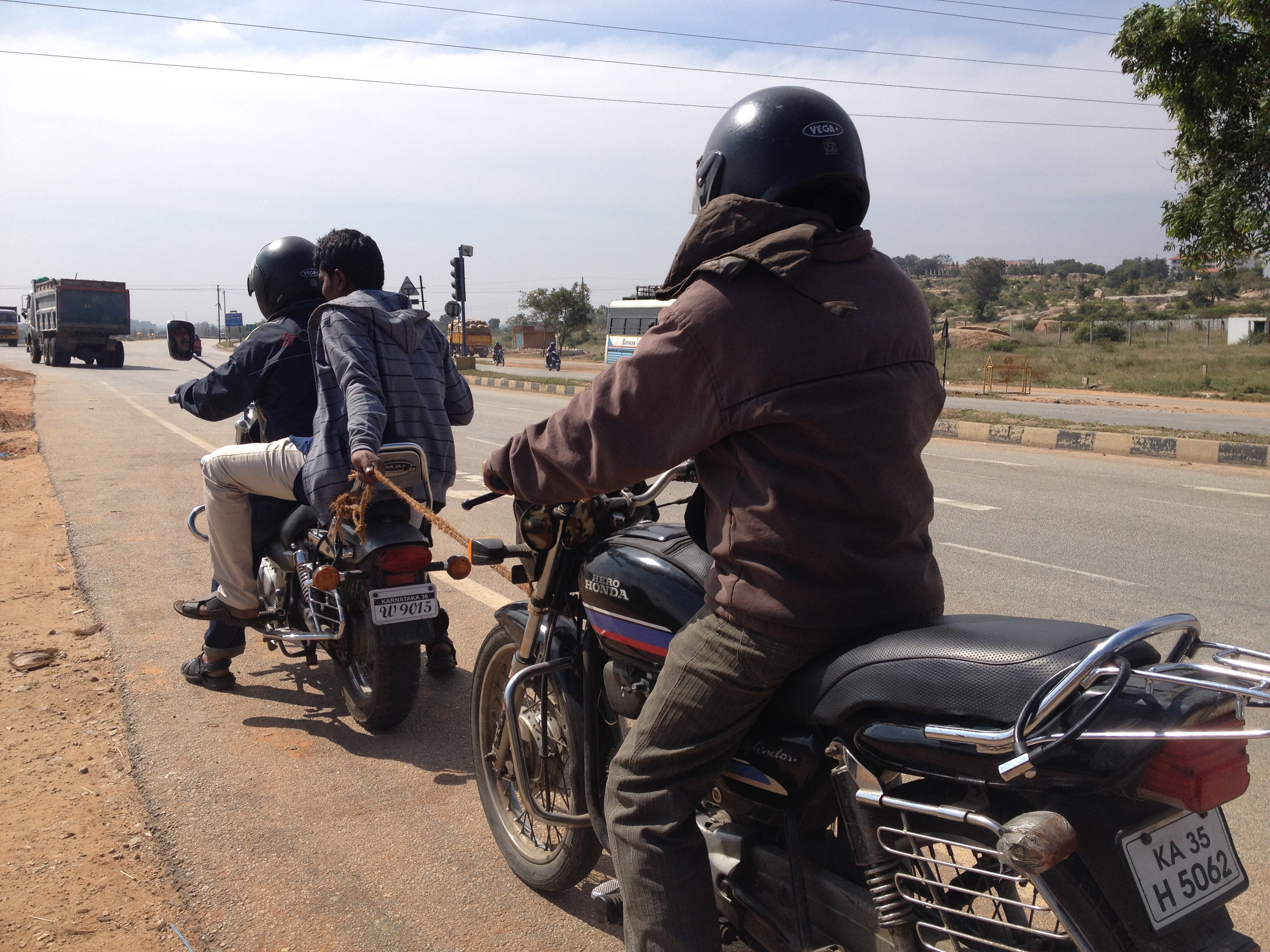
Jugaad technology: a motorcycle pulling another one by a rope

Jugaad can also refer to a homemade or locally made vehicle in India, Bangladesh, Pakistan. They are made by local mechanics using wooden planks, metal sheets and parts taken from different machines and vehicles.

One type of jugaad is a quadricycle, a vehicle made of wooden planks and old SUV parts, variously known as kuddukka and peter rehra in Northern India. However, jugaad is also used as a term for any low-cost vehicle which typically costs around Rs 50,000 (US$517.67). Jugaads may be powered by a diesel engine originally intended to power agricultural irrigation pumps. They are known for poor brakes, and cannot go faster than about 60 km/h (37 mph). The vehicle often carries more than 20 people at a time in remote locations and poor road conditions.

Though no statistical data is available, it is reported that there are a number of instances of failing brakes, requiring a passenger to jump off and manually apply a wooden block as a brake. As part of research for his 2013 book, Innovation and a Global Knowledge Economy in India, Thomas Birtchnell, a lecturer of Sustainable Communities at University of Wollongong, Australia, found that of 2,139 cases of road traffic casualties in 72 hours at J N Medical College hospital in Aligarh, 13.88% of pedestrian casualties were due to jugaad. It was stated by Minister of Road Transport and Highways Pon Radhakrishnan that jugaad do not conform to the specifications of a motor vehicle under the Motor Vehicles Act, 1988. These vehicles hence do not have any vehicle registration plate and they are not registered with the Regional Transport Office (RTO). Hence, no road tax is paid on them, neither there exists any official count of such vehicles.

Jugaad vehicles are not officially recognized as road-safe, and despite a few proposals to regulate them, vote-bank politics have trumped safety concerns. The improvised vehicles have now become rather popular as a means to transport all manner of burdens, from lumber to steel rods to school children. For safety reasons the Government of India has officially banned jugaad vehicles.

Another type of jugaad called bike-rehra or motorcycle-rehri, a motorcycle, moped or scooter modified into motorized trikes are used in the northern states of India, especially Punjab.

Another type of jugaad called phat-phatri rickshaw or phatphatiya rickshaw, WWII-era Harley Davidson motorcycles modified into motorized trikes which were earlier used in New Delhi.

A variant of the jugaad vehicle in the Tamil Nadu state of Southern India is the meen badi vandi. This roughly translates to 'fish bed vehicle' because they originated among local fishermen who needed a quick and cheap transport system to transport fish. It is a motorized tri-wheeler (derived from the non-motorized variant) with a heavy-duty suspension and a motorcycle engine—typically recycled from Czech Yezdi or Enfield Bullet vehicles. Its origins are typical of other jugaadu innovations—dead fish are typically considered unhygienic, and vehicles that carry them cannot be typically used to carry anything else. Similar vehicles can be found throughout much of Southeast Asia.

Another variant of the jugaad called chakkda rickshaw, a motorcycle modified into a tri-wheeler with truck wheels in the rear, is used in the Gujarat state of India.

A variant of jugaad in Pakistan is a motorcycle made into a motorized trike called chand-gari meaning "moon vehicle" or chingchee after the Chinese company Jinan Qingqi who first introduced these to the market.

Today, a jugaad is a transportation solution for rural Indians, Pakistanis, and Bangladeshis.

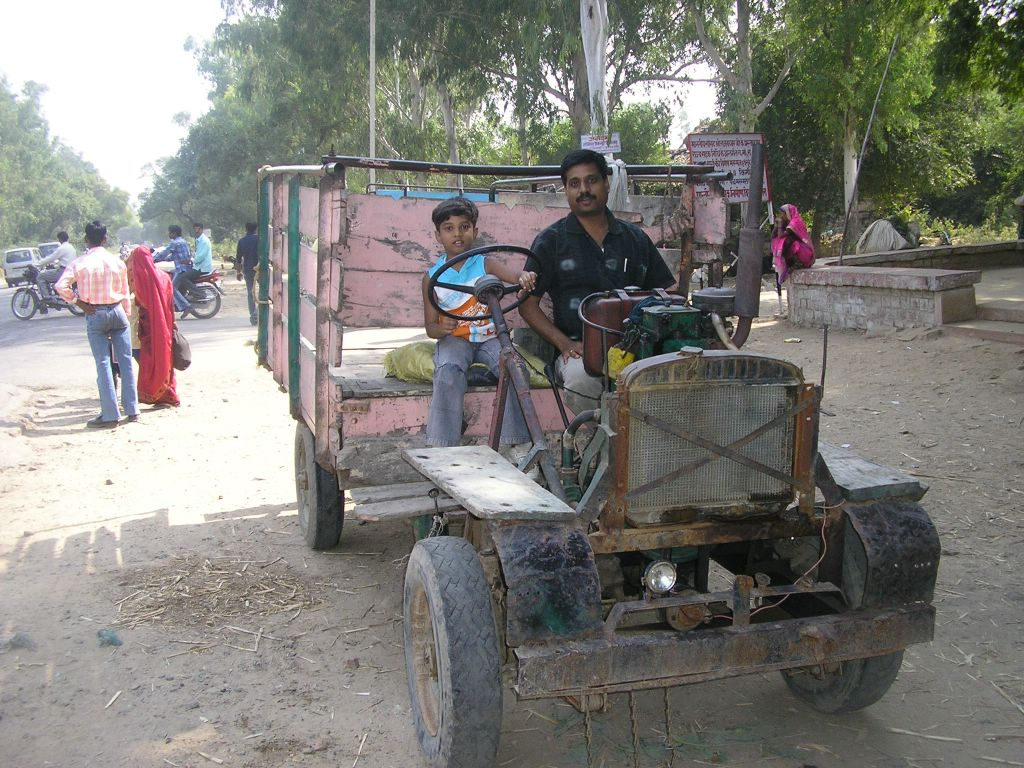
Jugaad vehicle peter rehra powered by an agricultural water pump engine

Jugaad engine being hand-started

Jugaad vehicle carrying passengers to a political rally in Agra, India

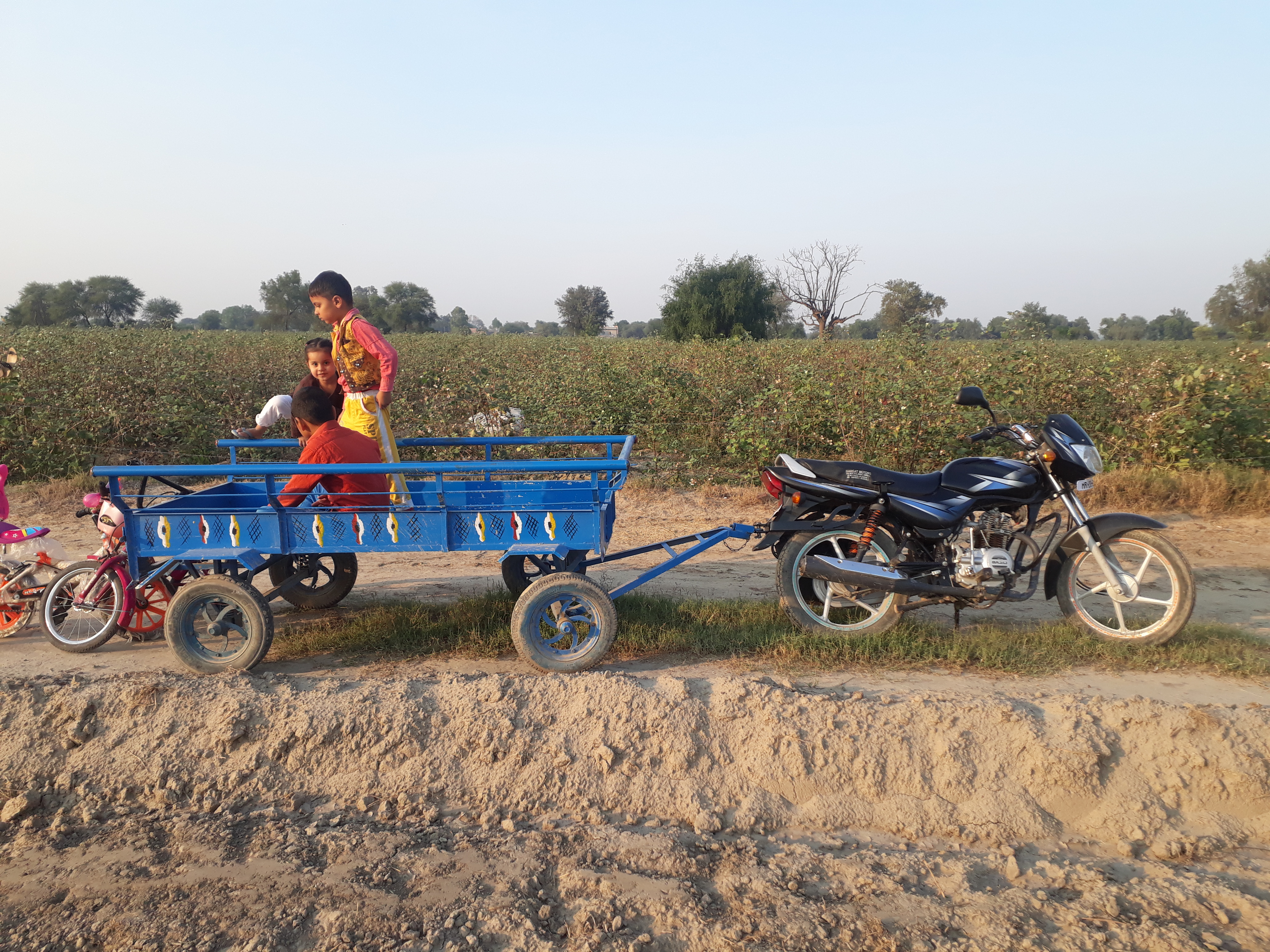
Bike-trolley, a jugaad trailer for motorcycles

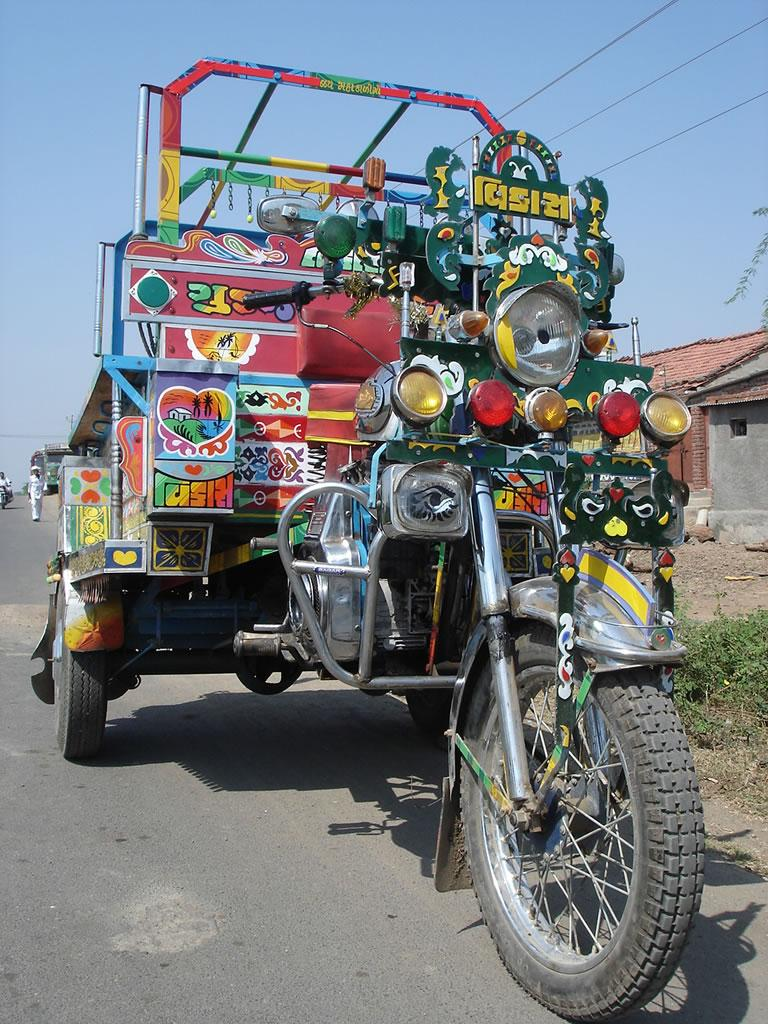
Chakkda rickshaw in Gujarat, India

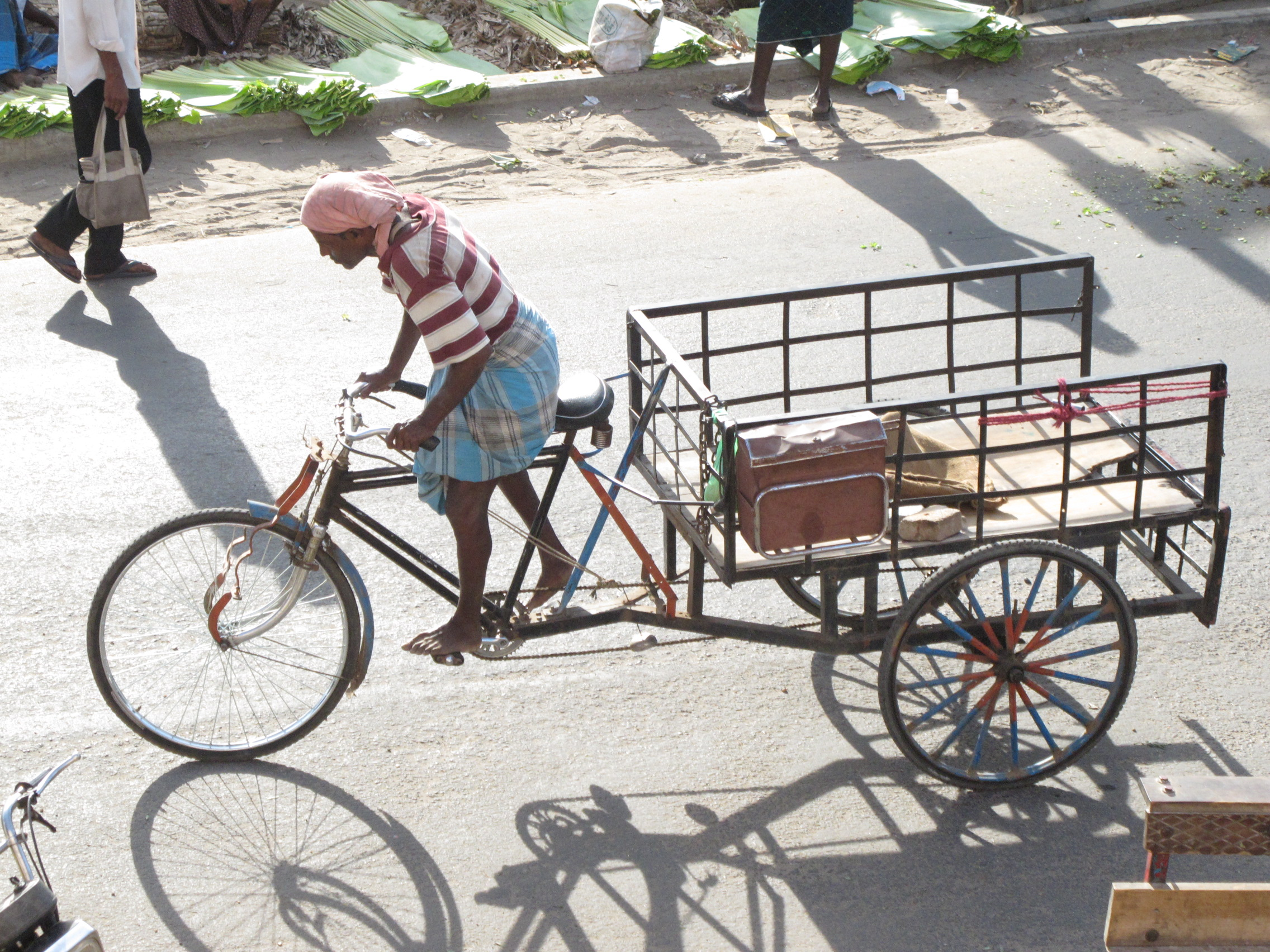
A non-motorized meen body vandi jugaad-style improvised vehicle, in Tamil Nadu, India

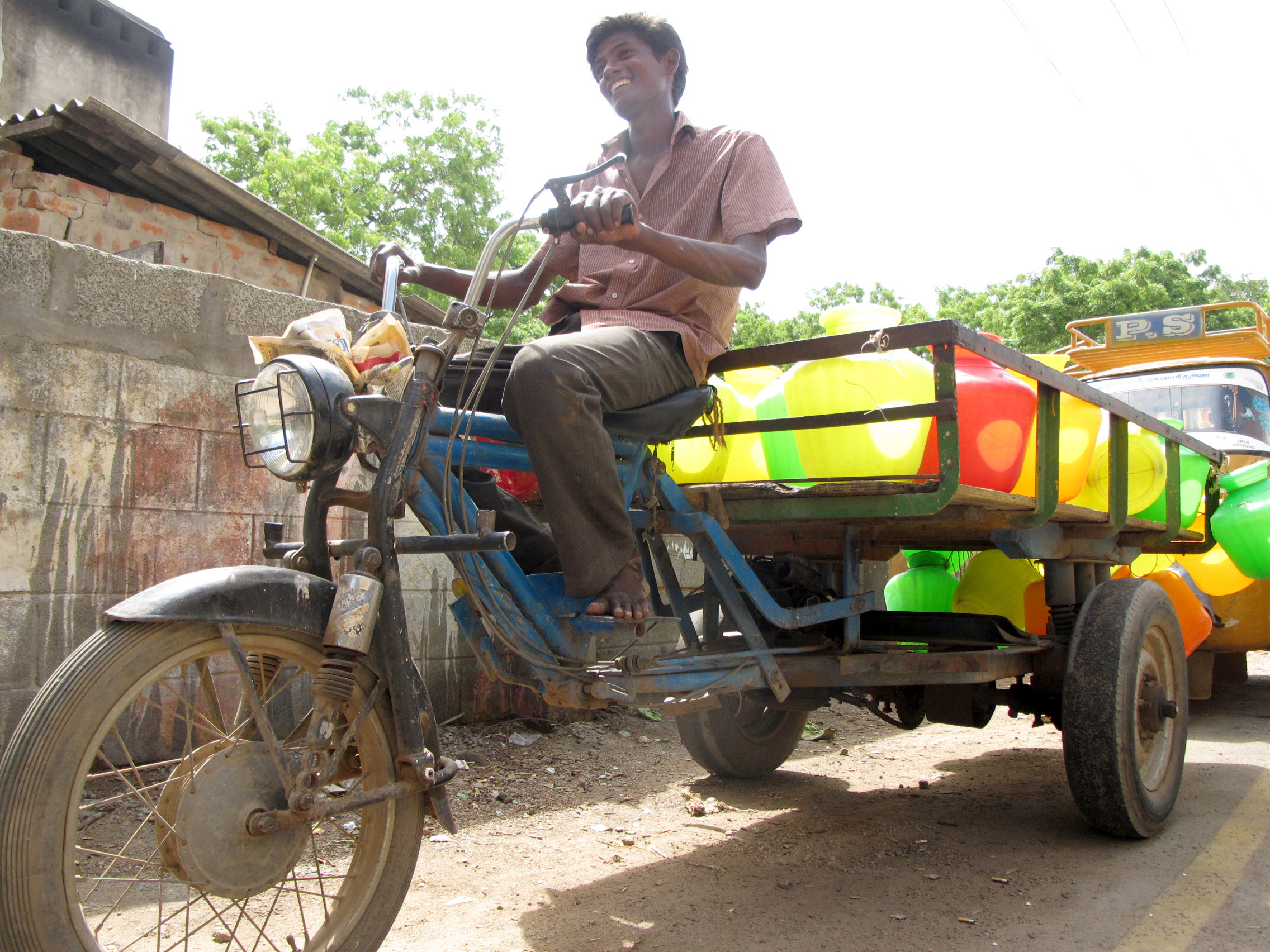
Motorised meen badi vandi

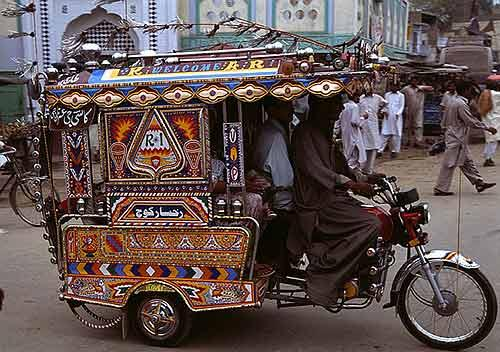
Chand-gari rickshaw in Pakistan

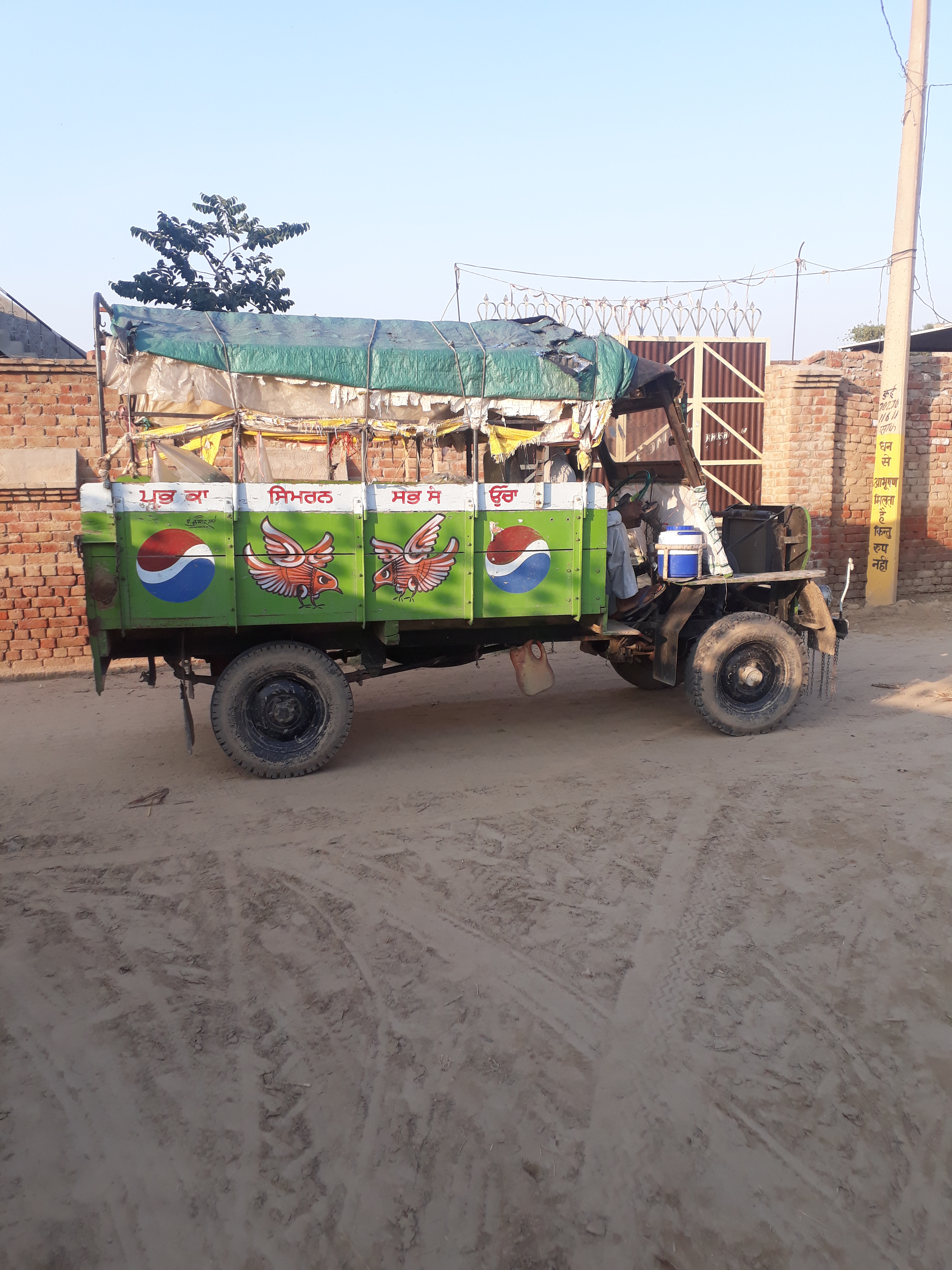
Diesel engine converted into a peter rehra vehicle in Punjab, India

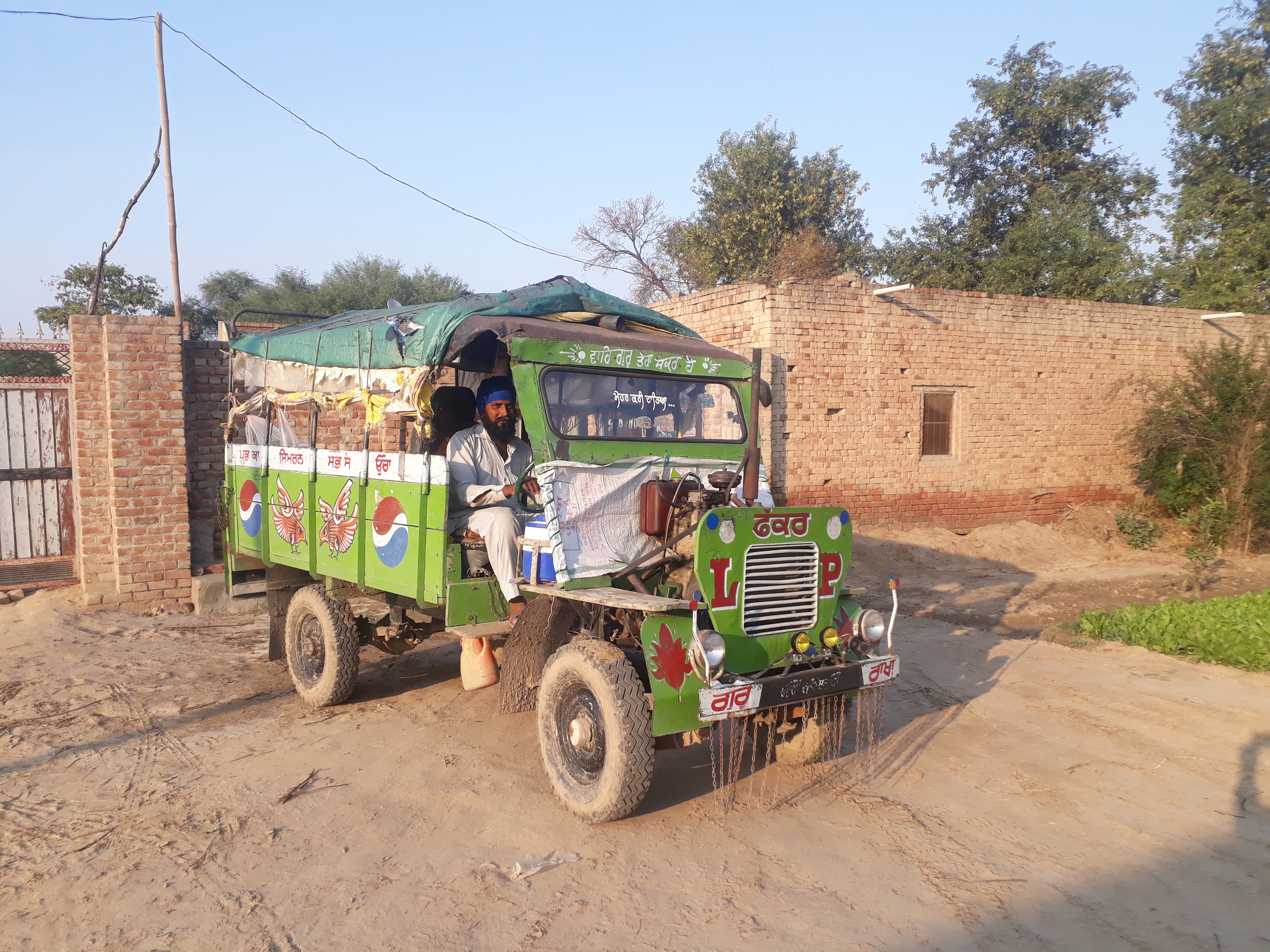
Peter rehra, a local vehicle made with a diesel engine in Punjab, India

== See also ==
- Improvisation – Process of devising a solution to a requirement in an ad hoc fashion
- Transport in India
- Transport in Pakistan
- Transport in Bangladesh
- Kludge
- Bricolage
