= Associated British Oil Engine Company =

The Associated British Oil Engine Company (ABOE) was a British engineering company. It started life as a combine, similar to Agricultural & General Engineers. Petters Limited joined ABOE in 1937. J&H McLaren & Co. was sold to ABOE in 1943, although it may have been a member from an earlier date. In 1945 Mirrlees, Bickerton and Day joined the group followed by the National Gas and Oil Engine company in 1950.

Later, ABOE became a more conventional company as the oil engine division of the Brush-ABOE Group of Companies, an ancestor of Brush Traction.
