= British Rail 15107 =

Type and origin
- Power type: Diesel-electric
- Builder: British Railways Swindon Works
- Serial number: Lot 363 (GWR Order)
- Build date: 30 November 1949
- Total produced: 1
Specifications
- Configuration
  - Whyte: 0-6-0DE
  - UIC: C
- Gauge: 4 ft 8 1/2 in (1,435 mm) standard gauge
- Wheel diameter: 4 ft 0 1/2 in (1.232 m)
- Wheelbase: 11 ft 6 in (3.505 m)
- Length: 29 ft 0 1/2 in (8.852 m)
- Width: 9 ft (2.743 m)
- Height: 12 ft 5 in (3.785 m)
- Loco weight: 46.10 long tons (46.84 t; 51.63 short tons)
- Fuel capacity: 600 imp gal (2,700 L; 720 US gal)
- Prime mover: Petter SS4
- Traction motors: Brush Traction, 2 off
- Cylinders: 4
- Transmission: Electric
- MU working: Not fitted
- Train heating: None
Performance figures
- Maximum speed: 20 mph (32 km/h)
- Power output: Engine: 360 bhp (268 kW)
- Tractive effort: 35,000 lbf (155.7 kN)
Career
- Operators: British Railways
- Numbers: 15107
- Axle load class: Route availability
- Retired: 16 June 1958
- Disposition: Scrapped, Swindon Works

British Rail 15107 was a 0-6-0 diesel-electric shunter locomotive commissioned by the Great Western Railway from its Swindon Works, but delivered to British Railways after nationalisation. It had a Petter 4-cylinder engine. Its shed allocation in 1950 was Western Region, 82B, St Philip's Marsh, Bristol.

Number 15107 had a short life and never acquired a British Railways classification. It was withdrawn in June 1958 and broken up at Swindon.

== See also ==
- British Rail Class D3/14
- GWR diesel shunters
- List of British Rail classes
