= Petters Limited =

Manufacturer of internal combustion engines

- Formerly: JB Petter & Sons of Yeovil
- Industry: Manufacturing
- Founded: 1896
- Founder: James Bazeley Petter
- Headquarters: Yeovil, Somerset
- Key people: B.J. Baker
- Products: stationary petrol and diesel engines

Petters Limited (known as JB Petter & Sons of Yeovil until 1910), were a maker of stationary petrol and diesel engines from 1896 onwards. In 1915 Petter founded Westland Aircraft Works (renamed "Westland Aircraft" in 1935). In 1986 Petters Limited merged with one-time rival R A Lister and Company to form Lister Petter.

== History ==
=== Car ===
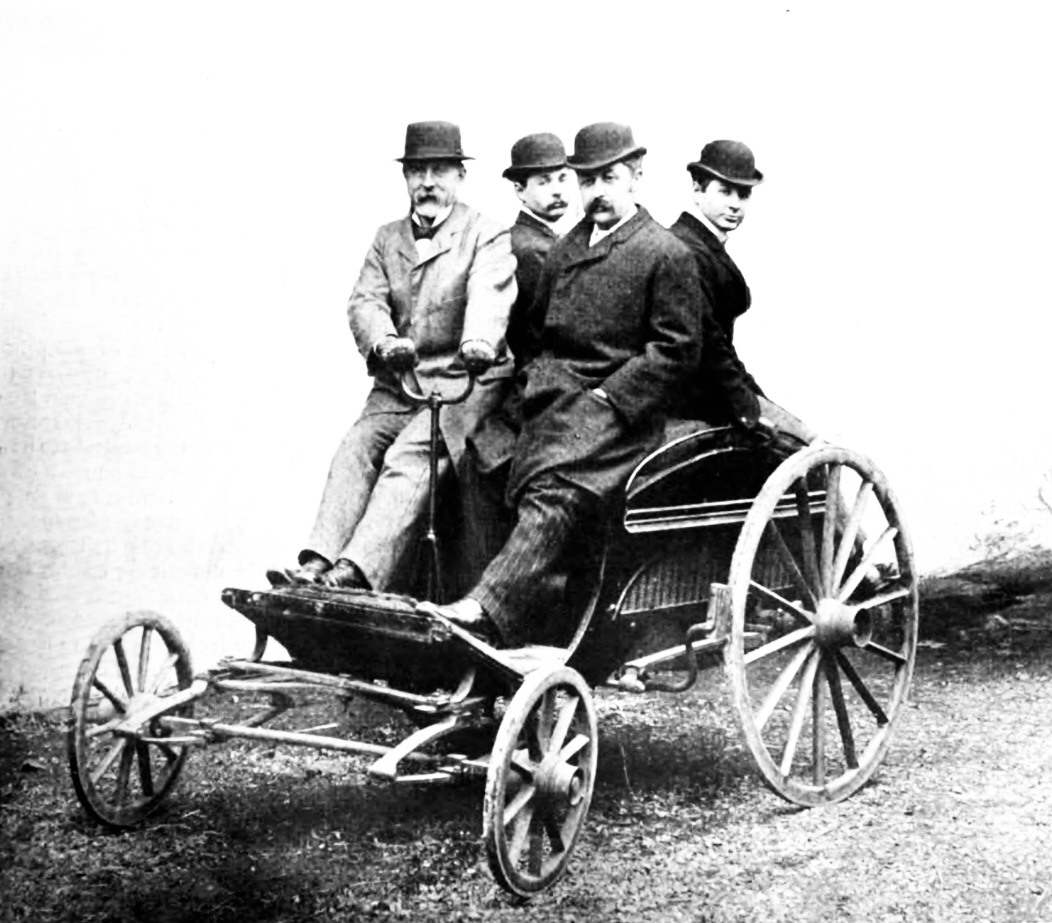
JB Petter & Sons of Yeovil (1896)

James Bazeley Petter, an agricultural engineer and iron founder, had premises in the Borough, Yeovil. It was there that Ernest and Percival, his twin sons, designed and built a self-propelled oil engine in 1892. Three years later they designed the first internal combustion engined motor car to be made in the United Kingdom. The car, using a converted four-wheel horse-drawn phaeton and a 3 hp (2 kW) twin-cylinder horizontal oil engine, had a top speed of 12 miles per hour (19 km/h). The vehicle was constructed at the Park Road carriage works of Hill and Boll. It weighed 9 cwt (457 kg) including the 120 lb (55 kg) of the Petter engine with its flywheel and side bars.

A contemporary report said:

The carriage is intended for two persons, with which a speed of ten miles an hour [16 km/h] is obtained on level road. It will mount the hills of the neighbourhood with two persons, but larger power would be used for four persons … The exhaust is, we are informed, quite invisible, and the engine almost noiseless'. The removable handle (indicated in the plan drawing) was used to start the engine 'in the first place, and an arrangement is made so that the handle, when put in position, automatically opens the exhaust valve which closes instantly when, a good impulse being given, the handle is withdrawn and the engine starts … Tube ignition is adopted, and a small heating lamp is used … The engine starts in ten minutes and runs, we are told, without attention.' The larger road wheels of the vehicle were 42 in (1.07 m.) in diameter.

The twins continued to develop vehicles, the twelfth of which they entered to a competition at Crystal Palace in 1897, without success.

=== Engines ===
Percival Petter, who in 1893 took over as manager of the Yeovil Foundry and Engineering Works, together with B. J. Baker, in 1894 designed and built first the Yeovil Engine, a high-speed steam engine. The following year he designed and built a small 2.5 hp oil engine for agricultural use that was immediately successful and the enterprise expanded, with Jacobs becoming chief engineer - a position he held until his death in 1936 - such that by 1904 over a thousand Petter oil engines were sold, ranging in capacity from 1 hp to 30 hp.

In parallel with these efforts in 1902 Petter and Jacobs created the first agricultural tractor, powered by a 30 hp oil engine.

By 1908 sales had increased principally against very large orders from Russia where two-stroke engines were preferred.

In 1911 the company, whose machines now ranged from 70 hp to 300 hp, won the Gran Prix at the Milan International Exhibition, and production hovered around 1,500 per annum.

==== Petter Standard and Handyman ====
Petter Standard oil engines were horizontal open crank engines made to very high standards, which was put into production under way in the same year but around 1903 cheap American imports arrived disrupting the British market, including the newly created J. B. Petter Company Limited. Highly competitive US-manufactured engines like those manufactured by the Fairbanks Morse Company "Jack of all Trades" threatened the nascent British industry but unlike most British engine manufacturers Petter reacted by creating a new low-cost engine, the Petter Handyman. Costing approximately 80% of the Petter Standard and available only in batches of 50 or more units for more economic production, the young company's market position was preserved for the next two decades, enabling Petters to produce both two-stroke and four-stroke engines from 1920.

==== A and M types ====
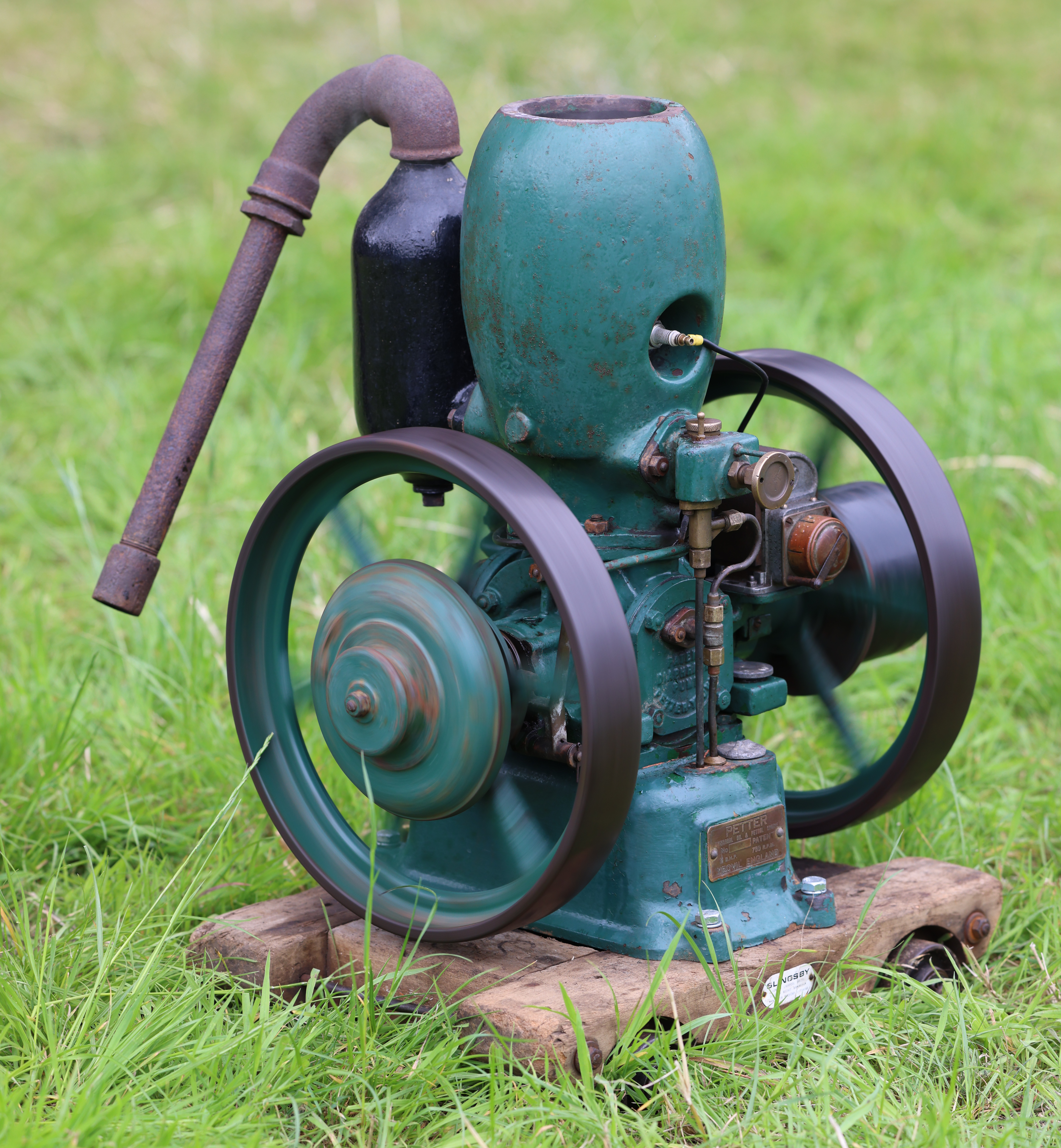
A 1931 Petter M type stationary engine

Petters models as the M-type and the A-type were highly successful and were competitors for Lister's D-Type.

==== SS type ====
The last two-stroke design was the "SS" introduced in 1938, available in two- to six-cylinder versions delivering 125 hp-375 hp. The SS designation stood for "superscavenge", the design employing the Kadenacy principle to charge the cylinders. The exhaust gases left the cylinder at sufficiently high speed to create a partial vacuum, drawing air into the cylinder like a supercharger, while improved airflow cooled the valves and scavenging, this 'inertial' supercharging being supplemented by a blower.

Running at low temperatures due to a patented oil-cooled piston, and featuring a spherical small end bearing, they were used in British Rail 15107 and British Rail Class D3/14 locomotives.

==== Specification of Petter SS engines ====
Bore            8.5 inch (216 mm)
Stroke         13.0 inch (330 mm)
Speed          500 revolutions per minute
Piston speed   1,082 feet per minute[9]

==== Power output ====
Cylinders	2	3	4	6
BHP (full load)	160	240	320	480
Before July 1946	150	225	300	450

In the railway locomotives, the SS4 was uprated to 360 BHP.

Some Petter manuals are available for download at Internal Fire – Museum of Power.

==== Various ====
Petter models included the two-stroke M-type (petrol), the S-type (stationary diesel) and the A- and A1 (air-cooled) - the only noticeable difference between the last two being the position of the magneto (in the type A it protrudes; in the type A1 it is tucked away below), and an economy 'handyman' version of the M-type, and a comprehensive range of air-cooled diesels that included the PAZ1, AVA range, and the 3.5 hp AA1.

== Re-organization ==
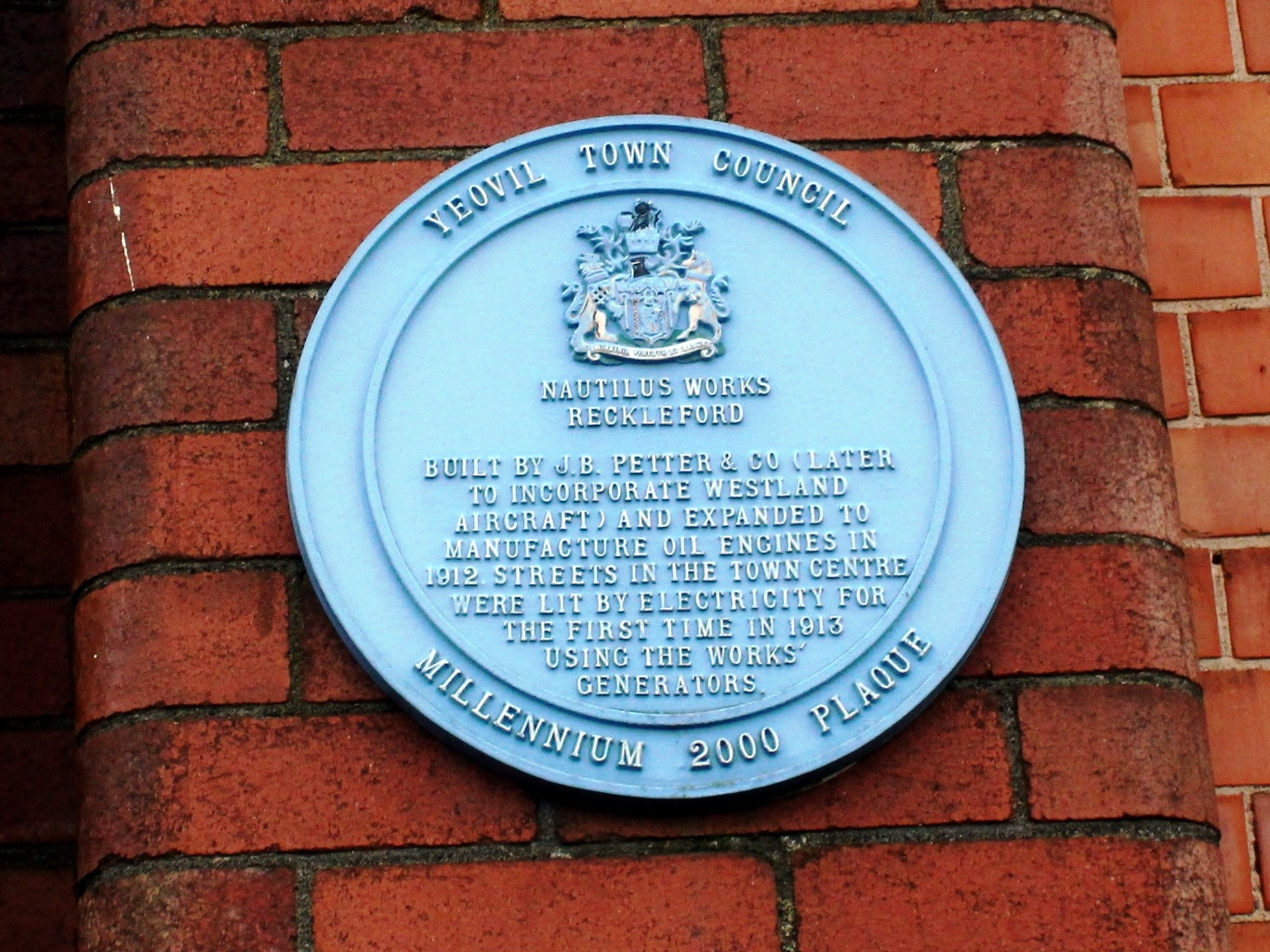
A blue plaque on the Nautilus Works which is now a bus depot

In 1910, the company was established as a public company and began engine production in a new factory named the Nautilus Works (after the fire grates that had made James Petter's fortune) in Reckleford, Yeovil. Its workforce of 500 men produced 1500 engines a year. The company also engaged in the manufacture of tractors.

=== Vickers-Petters ===
Petters was renamed Vickers-Petters Ltd after it bought the former Vickers factory in Ipswich in 1920 but that part of the business was renamed Petters (Ipswich) in 1927. The Ipswich factory was closed by mid 1929 and the Ipswich works and land sold.

Petters joined the Associated British Oil Engine Company in 1937. After the war the group was obtained by British Electrical Group, with Petter spun off in 1949 joining another engine manufacturer, J&H McLaren & Co., at the old Lagonda works in Egham Hythe near Staines, Middlesex, employing over 1,000 people at its peak. In 1957 the company was acquired by Hawker Siddeley and some production was moved to Hamble as the reorganized company was split into four groups within Hawker Siddeley Brush Group—Petter Staines (small engines), Petter Generator Divisions, Petter Marine Division, Petter Service Division and Thermo-King Division (building refrigeration units under license from the US firm Thermo-King). In 1984 Petter was merged with Lister to form Lister Petter Co. Ltd. The Staines site was sold in 1988 and all production was concentrated at the former Lister factory in Dursley, Gloucestershire.

== Calculators ==
In the 1930s the company manufactured mechanical calculators. The company obtained a patent on calculator technology in 1923 and two more in 1930. Guy Bazeley Petter then took out equivalent US patents and assigned the rights to the company. The company subsequently sold its calculator designs to the Bell Punch company.

== Petteroid ==
"Petteroid" is a nickname given to engines built under licence in India to Petter design. While rural contraptions in work used for casual heavy transport in Indian Punjab are known as "peter rehras" after the brand of engine that gained popularity there in days gone by.
