= J&H McLaren & Co. =

British engineering company

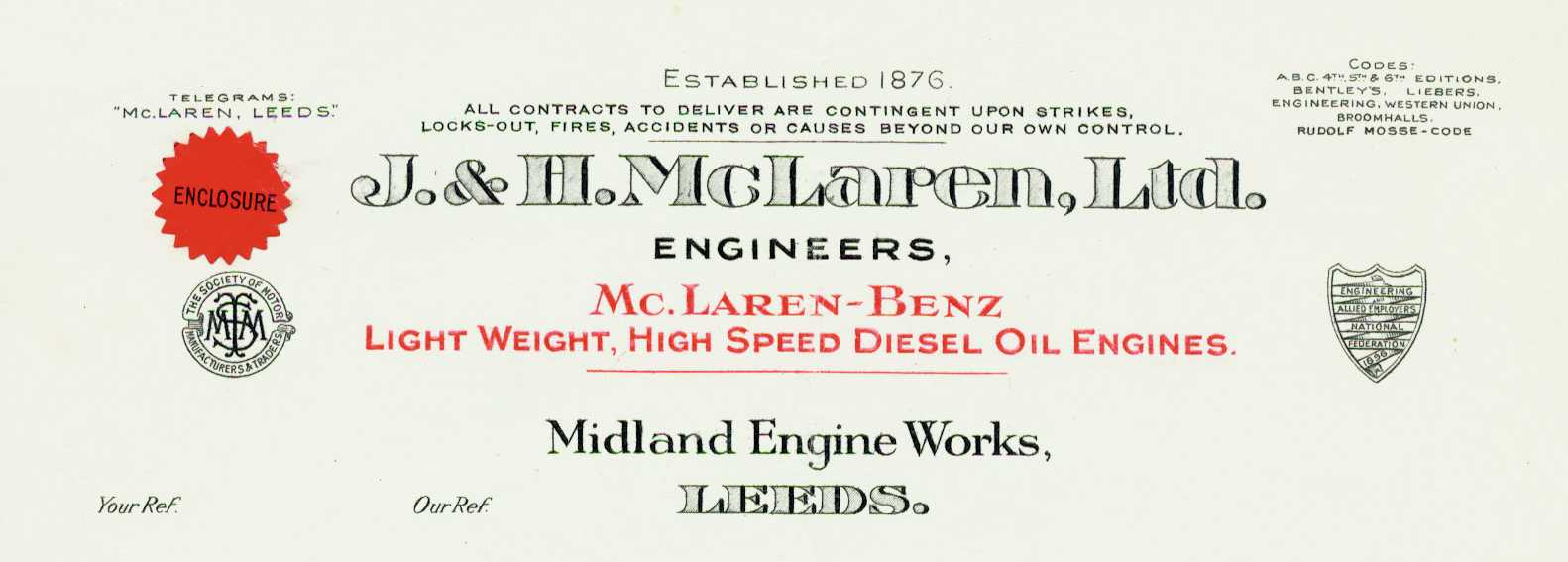
- J & H McLaren letterhead
- Company type: manufacturing
- Founded: 1876; 150 years ago in Hunslet, England
- Founders: John McLaren, Henry McLaren
- Defunct: 1959
- Fate: Sold
- Successor: Hawker Siddeley
- Headquarters: Hunslet, Leeds, England
- Products: Traction engines; Stationary engines; Diesel engines

J&H McLaren was a British engineering company in Hunslet, Leeds, England, that manufactured traction engines, stationary engines and later, diesel engines.

The company was founded in 1876 by John and Henry McLaren. They had both been apprenticed to Black, Hawthorn & Co of Gateshead, builders of railway locomotive and marine engines. The new Midland Engine Works was situated on Jack Lane in Hunslet, Leeds within sight of many of the great engineering companies of Leeds, e.g. Hudswell Clarke, Hunslet Engine Co. Manning Wardle, John Fowler & Co. and Kitson & Co.

== Steam power ==
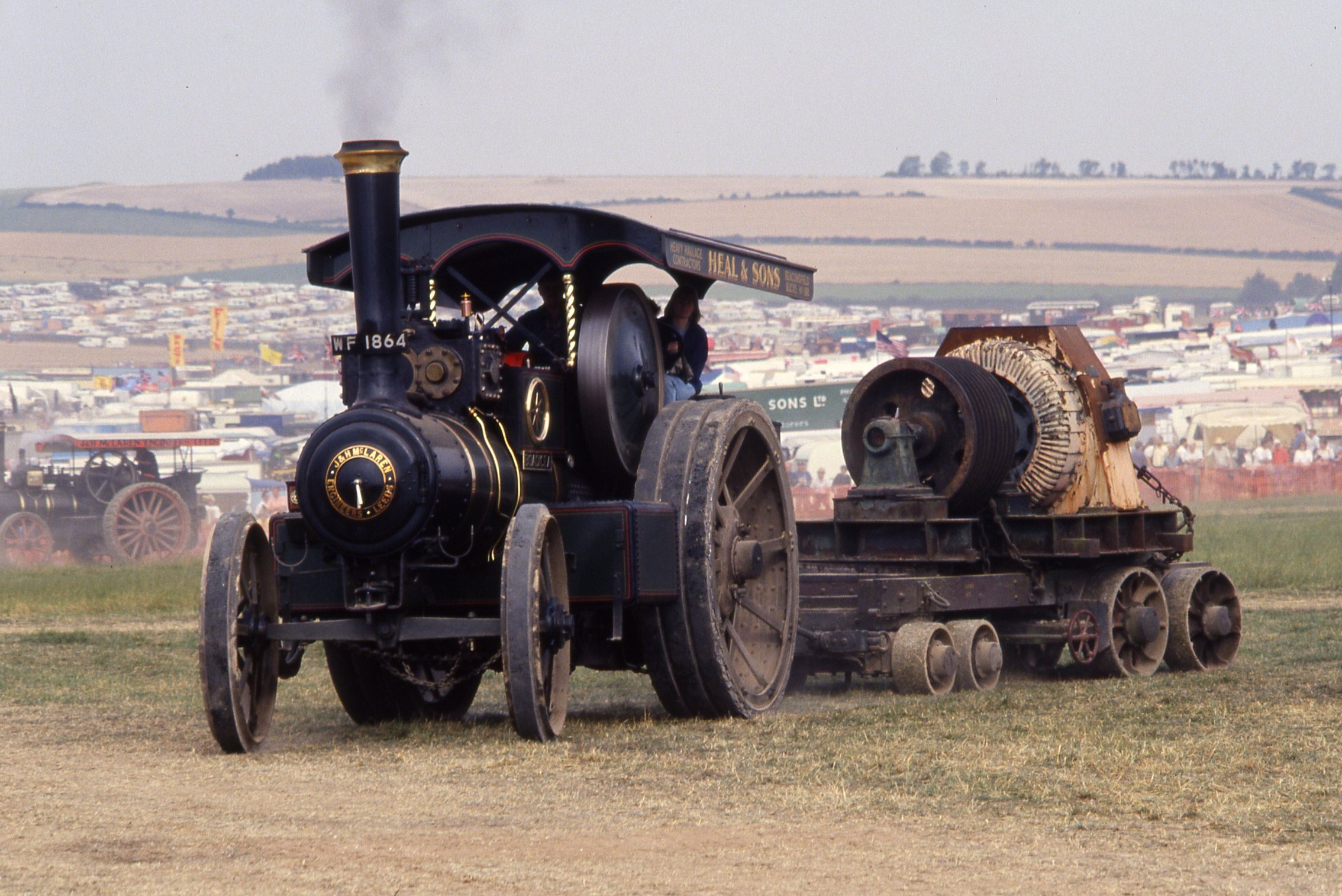
McLaren traction engine no.1652 of 1919 at Great Dorset Steam Fair 1993

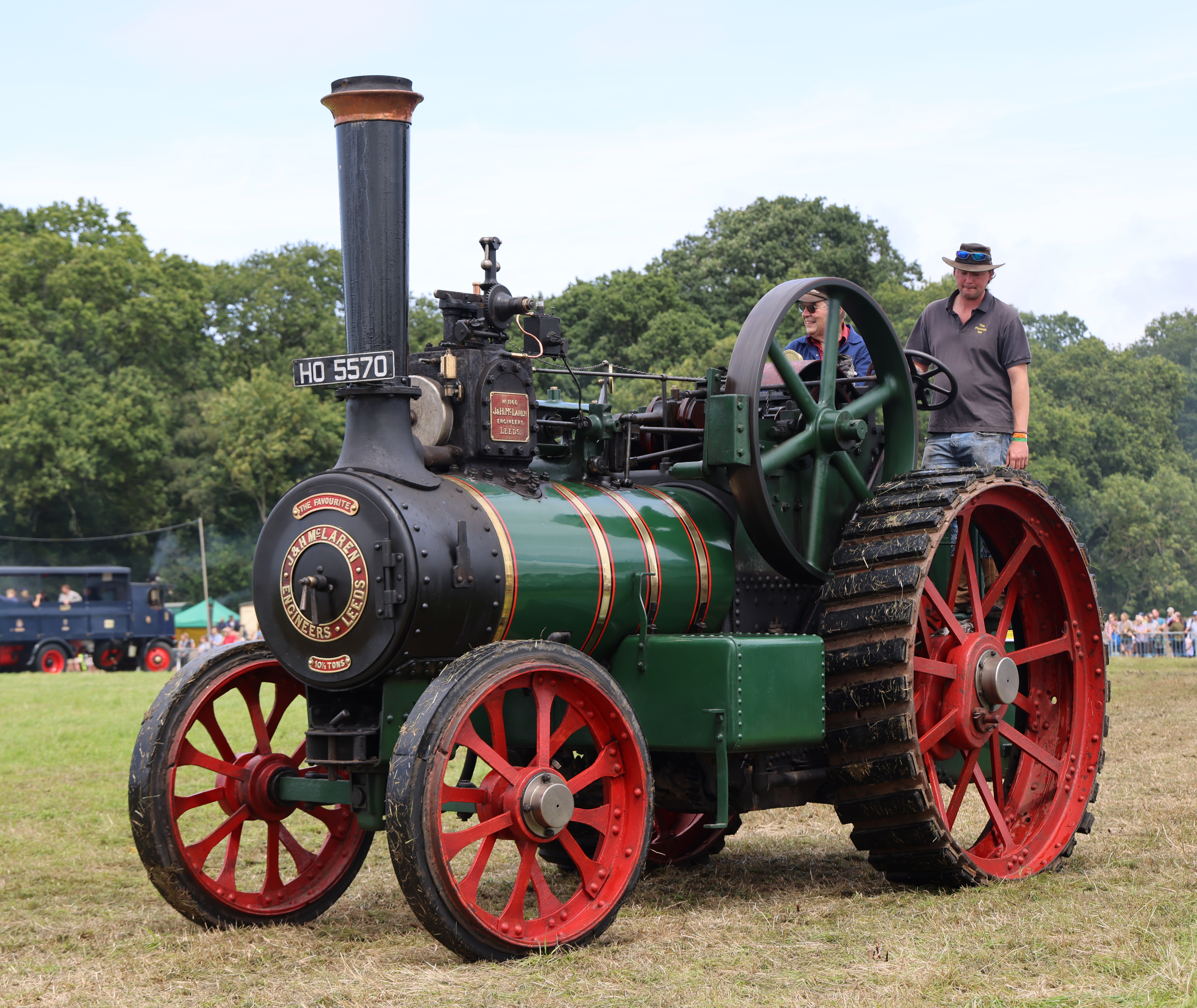
1910 McLaren 8NHP General Purpose engine

McLaren's first traction engine was built in 1877. The company rapidly developed a range of traction engines, steam rollers, ploughing engines, agricultural implements and stationary engines. One of their forgotten achievements is the invention, British Patent 763 of 1880, of the traction-centre engine, for driving steam-powered fairground roundabouts. This is often wrongly attributed to Savage of King's Lynn. (Note: Frederick Savage first used a steam engine in the middle of a carousel in 1868, predating this patent by 12 years. This may not have been the original design of 'centre engine', but it was certainly Savage's who were best known for their centre engines. (More research required here!)) In the 1890s, McLaren developed a range of vertical triple-expansion engines for the new industry of electricity generation. The zenith of this effort was a pair of 3000 ihp engines for Leeds Corporation's Whitehall Road Power Station. After the start of the 20th century, the company introduced a tractor for direct haulage and a range of powerful direct-ploughing engines. The largest of these, rated 125 ihp, was fitted with superheater, feedwater heater and fully lagged cylinders. This provided a very efficient engine, which won many awards both at home and abroad. Other products were, showmen's engines, crane engines, portable engines, railway locomotives and Darby Steam-Diggers. The company produced a total of 81 steamrollers of various types.

McLaren had a good overseas market with over 50% of goods exported. They had local offices in New Zealand, Australia, South Africa, and South America with smaller representation in Hungary, Germany and Italy. In 1886 they sold three traction engines to the French postal service. The company produced its last steamroller in 1928 which was exported to New Zealand. The last of the traction engines was exported to South Africa in 1938 and is preserved in Johannesburg.

== Diesel power ==
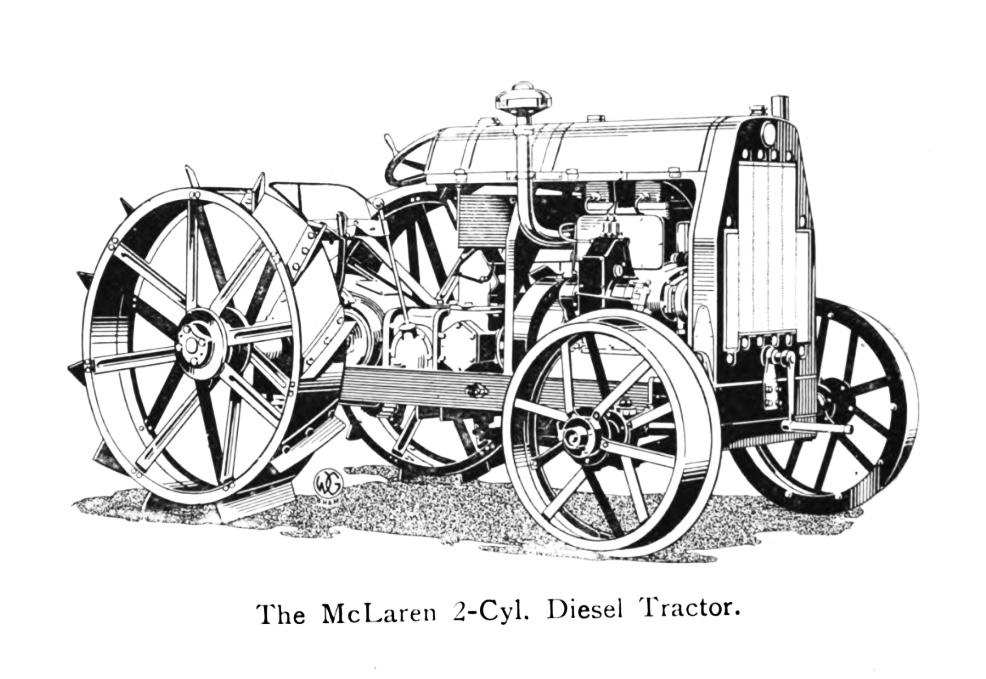
McLaren 16-28 (1926-ca.1931)

During the First World War, McLaren inevitably became involved in the war effort. The works were particularly noted for producing a collet chuck for holding shells during turning. For his efforts during the war, John McLaren was knighted, but unfortunately his reward was short-lived, for he died in 1920.

After the First World War, McLaren built a cable-ploughing windlass, initially powered by a Dorman petrol engine but a diesel engine was sought. In 1926 the company entered into an agreement with the German Company Benz to manufacture diesel engines. These were the first automotive-type diesel engines produced in volume in Britain, and as a result were in the forefront of the use of diesel engines for road, rail, and agricultural purposes. Examples include the first diesel-powered railway locomotive, built by Hudswell Clarke in Leeds and powered by a McLaren-built diesel. The first diesel-powered commercial vehicles in Britain were made by Richard Garrett & Sons of Leiston in 1928, and Kerr Stuart of Stoke-on-Trent, again powered by McLaren-built diesels. In addition, McLaren built Britain's first diesel-powered road roller in 1927 using their own engine. A complete range of diesel engines was designed up to around 400 hp and these were very widely used for industrial applications. One particularly successful use was in standby power sets.

In 1943, the business was sold by the family to the Associated British Oil Engine Company and this was initially very successful. A major contract with the USSR for diesel-generator sets resulted in the number of employees increasing tenfold and new buildings acquired. In December 1945, McLaren took over the remains of Kitson & Co. and with it their Airedale Works. McLaren had an arrangement with Petters Limited and some engines were sold under the name Petter-McLaren.

== Closure ==
In 1957, the take over of the Brush A.B.O.E. Group by Hawker Siddeley saw the Leeds production facility fade away and the main works closed in January 1959.

About 40 of McLaren's steam engines survived into preservation.
