= British Rail Class D3/9 =

Diesel-electric shunting locomotives

LNER J45 or DES1 class British Rail Class D3/9
Type and origin
- Power type: Diesel-electric
- Builder: London and North Eastern Railway’s Doncaster Works
- Serial number: 1960, 1963, 1973, 1978
- Build date: 1944–1945
- Total produced: 4
Specifications
- Configuration
  - Whyte: 0-6-0DE
  - UIC: C
- Gauge: 4 ft 8 1/2 in (1,435 mm) standard gauge
- Wheel diameter: 4 ft 0 in (1.219 m)
- Loco weight: 50.0–51.0 long tons (50.8–51.8 t; 56.0–57.1 short tons)
- Prime mover: English Electric 6KT
- Traction motors: English Electric, 2 off
- MU working: Not fitted
- Train heating: None
- Train brakes: Vacuum
Performance figures
- Maximum speed: 20 mph (32 km/h)
- Power output: Engine: 350 bhp (261 kW)
- Tractive effort: 32,000 lbf (142.3 kN)
Career
- Operators: London and North Eastern Railway, British Railways
- Class: LNER: J45; DES1 from September 1945; BR: DEJ1; later D3/9; later 3/10
- Numbers: LNER 8000–8003, BR 15000–15003
- Axle load class: LNER: RA 5; BR: RA 7
- Retired: 1967
- Disposition: All scrapped, 1968

British Rail Class D3/9 was a class of four locomotives built by the London and North Eastern Railway at their Doncaster Works in England. It was a diesel powered locomotive in the pre-TOPS period, they could also be used as mobile power stations if required.

Five locomotives were due to be built, only four saw completion, with the final becoming a Class D3/14.

== Allocations ==
The allocations for the four locomotives are similar, all having worked in Stratford, March and Crewe.

=== 15000 ===
Upon completion in July 1944, it was used as the works shunter at Doncaster Works and as a shunter at Doncaster Shed. in August 1944 it was sent to Stratford Shed, where it was used at Temple Mills and Goodmayes Yards. It moved to March Shed after nationalisation alongside 15001. In November 1946, it moved to Eastfield Shed in Glasgow and worked at Cadder and Sighthill Yards. In December 1946, it returned to March. In January 1966, it moved to Crewe Diesel Depot, moving to Stoke shed in February and Crewe South depot in April 1966. In August 1968, it was sold to A. King Scrap Merchant in Norwich and was cut up by the end of the month.

=== 15001 ===
The allocations of 15001 follow that of 15000. It worked at Doncaster and was sent to London along with 15000, working at Liverpool Street station and Temple Mills Yard. It moved to March in 1945 and in January 1956 it moved to Immingham, returning to March in 1956. In January 1966 it moved to Crewe and in November 1966 it moved to Derby Works when it was withdrawn. It was sold in August 1967 to Steelbreaking & Dismantling at Chesterfield but was resold to J. Cashmore, Great Bridge, West Midlands, and was cut up.

=== 15002 ===
15002 was completed in November 1944 and after trials around Doncaster it was sent to Stratford in March 1945. It transferred to March shed in June 1945. It was repaired at Derby Works in 1950 and it moved to Crewe in January 1966 and withdrawn in August 1967. It then moved from Crewe to store and Stafford Shed and Bescot Yard. It was sold to A. King in Norwich for scrap, although it was scrapped at H. Bridges Ltd., at Bescot in November 1968.

=== 15003 ===
Alongside 15002, it was completed in November 1944 and moved to Stratford in March 1945. It moved to March shed in June 1945 alongside 15000 and 15002. In February 1952 it moved to Feltham yard, returning to March shed soon after. In January 1966 it moved to Crewe. It was withdrawn in May 1967 and was sold to Slag Reduction Co., Ickles, Rotherham and was broken up in August 1968.

== See also ==
- List of British Rail classes
