= Lister Petter =

British manufacturer of internal combustion engines

- Type: Private company
- Industry: Manufacturing and Distribution
- Predecessor: R A Lister and Company; Petters Limited
- Founded: 1986
- Founder: Hawker Siddeley (Merger)
- Headquarters: Hardwicke, Stroud, Gloucestershire, England
- Products: Engines, generator sets and associated services
- Brands: Lister, Petter
- Owner: Hawker Siddeley (1986–1996); Schroders Venture Capital (1996–2000); EGL Group (2012–2017); Sleeman and Hawken

Lister Petter is a British company with assembly lines in India, China and elsewhere, that manufactures internal combustion engines for industry.

== History ==
The company was formed in 1986, after owner Hawker Siddeley merged Dursley, Gloucestershire based R A Lister and Company (acquired in 1965), with Yeovil, Somerset based Petters Limited (acquired in 1957).

In 1992, Hawker Siddeley Group Plc was acquired by BTR plc for £1.5bn. In 1999 BTR merged with Siebe to form BTR Siebe plc, which was renamed Invensys plc. In preparation, BTR sold any subsidiary operations, including Lister-Petter in 1996 to Schroders Venture Capital.

In 2000, with Schroders looking to exit, the firm was bought through a £13.5M management buyout, enabled through selling the original Lister factory site to the South West Regional Development Agency. By this time, the core engine products were in demise, and the company employed around 250 people on a turnover of £35M. Cost-cutting measures included closing the award-winning foundry in 2001: it had been one of the most advanced in Europe when it opened in 1937. In 2003, the company fell into its first administration.

== Products ==
Historically, Lister, Petter and later Lister Petter produced a range of small and medium diesel engines for industrial, agricultural, marine and power generation use. Earlier engine families included air-cooled and water-cooled designs such as the A-series, Alpha, Delta, Gamma, Omega, TR and LPW ranges, among others.

In the 2020s, Lister Petter's published engine catalogue included several diesel and gas engine series for industrial and power-generation applications, including Starlite, Mercury Max, Jupiter, Venus, Venus Max, Mars Max and Earth Max.

In 2025, the company's diesel engine range was reported as extending from 5 kW to 960 kW. Some China-produced engines were built to company specifications developed in 2022 with consultant partners including Ricardo and AVL.

In 2026, the Earth Max series was launched for large-scale fixed-speed power-generation applications, with engine outputs from 1,020 kW to 2,220 kW and generator installations of up to 2,750 kVA.

== Applications ==
Lister Petter engines are generally used in stationary industrial applications such as pumping and electricity generation. The company produces a range of complete generator sets, units equipped for welding and in-house pumping sets, as well as supplying engines to other equipment manufacturers. L-P engines are widely exported, especially for use in irrigation projects. The company also maintains a long tradition (of both its founder companies) in supplying engines for marine applications both as prime mover engines for small vessels and as auxiliary power units in larger ones.

== Gas-fuelled engines ==
Lister Petter's main product, the 'Alpha' series of sub-2-litre engines, is also available in spark ignition forms for running on natural gas or propane. L-P also manufactures and sells biodiesel plants, allowing customers to produce their own fuel for diesel engines.

== History ==
- 1867 R A Lister company founded by Robert Ashton Lister.
- 1893 James B Petter & Sons founded.
- 1895 First oil engines made by Petters.
- 1910 Petters Ltd founded.
- 1929 First diesel engines produced by R A Lister in Dursley.
- 1960s/1970s peak employment of over 5,000
- 1986 R A Lister and Petters Ltd merged to form Lister Petter Ltd.
- 2004/2005 Lister Petter sees unprecedented growth and re-investment in its core products
- 2013 Goes into administration
- 2014 moves operations to former RAF Aston Down site, saves 80 jobs

Lister and Petter engines were workhorses of the British Commonwealth; many of these engines are still in use today in dump trucks, generators and water pumps. They generally, but not exclusively, leave the factory in a Mid Brunswick Green colouring.

== Locations ==
The company's headquarters and manufacturing facility until 2013 were in Dursley, Gloucestershire, formerly the headquarters of R A Lister and Company. After the company fell into administration in late 2013, the assets were bought by EGL Group of Birmingham. The headquarters had already moved to Hardwicke, and the operations were then moved to the former RAF Aston Down. The company also manufactured diesel engines at their factory at Wroughton, near Swindon, Wiltshire until its closure in 1992. The factory, which been purchased from the Admiralty in 1946 and had originally produced marine gun mountings during World War 2, was still known locally as Marine Mountings.

Lister Petter have agents in France, the United States, China and India, which market their products and carry out final assembly of larger items such as generating sets from imported parts.
