= March TMD =

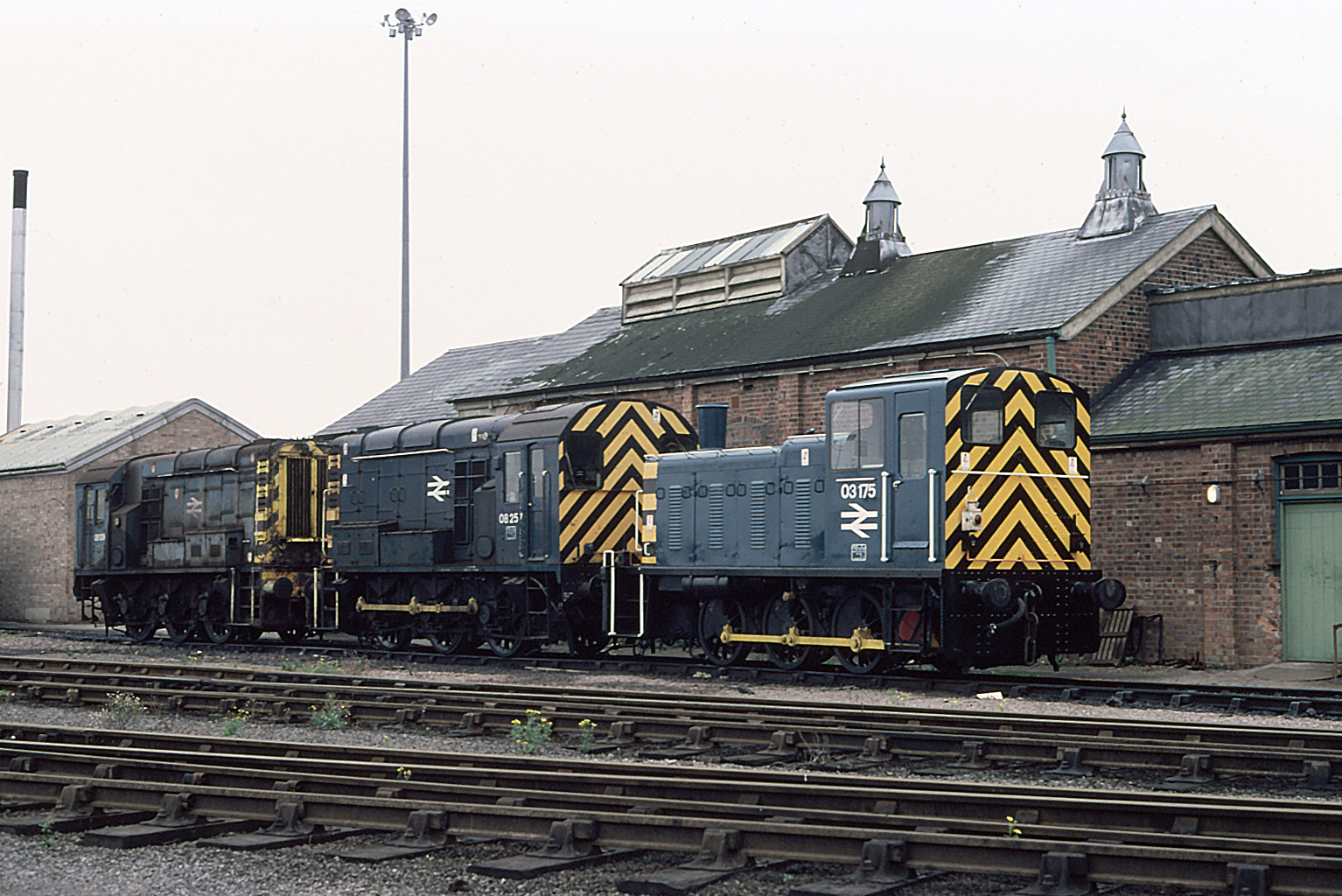
- Diesel shunters outside March Depot in 1980
- Interactive map of March TMD

Location
- Location: March, Cambridgeshire, United Kingdom
- Coordinates: 52.5650°N 0.0824°E
- OS grid: TL411984

Characteristics
- Depot code: MR (1973-)

History
- Former depot code: 31B (1948-1973)

March TMD is a railway traction maintenance depot situated near March, England. March was a steam locomotive shed under British Railways with the depot code 31B; the depot code of the diesel depot under BR was MR. The nearest railway station is March, and the depot was located close to the Whitemoor Marshalling Yard. Despite its rural location, in the 1970s it accommodated a similar number of locomotives to the comparatively larger Toton TMD and served as the main diesel depot for East Anglia.

== History ==
March Shed was built by the Great Eastern Railway (GER) as part of the redevelopment of local railway facilities in the mid-1880s when the construction of a new, larger station at March had meant that the earlier engine shed had had to be demolished. Construction of the new shed included realigning the branch line to Wisbech further west and replacing a level crossing at Norwood Road with a bridge. The new shed was a brick-built 6-track straight shed with a triple gable style slate roof. It was provided with the two northerly roads as through and the other 4 roads as dead-ended on the west side. In 1900 a turntable was provided on the north side of the shed yard; this was enlarged to 70 feet in 1925 when a corrugated asbestos-cladded 4-track straight through shed was added along the north side of the original structure.

The 1923 Grouping incorporated GER into the London and North Eastern Railway (LNER). The LNER then built a new locomotive shed on Hundred Road with a Mitchell Conveyor and Transporter Co. mechanical coaling plant for the engines, with an associated electricity generating plant. The former GER engine shed was retained to undertake heavy repairs. A brick-built 5-track straight through washout shed was added in 1933. A water softener with a capacity of 11,700 gallons per hour was added in 1939 at a cost of over £12,000.

=== World War II ===
During WWII, March Shed was considered of strategic importance at both operational and national levels. Some of the LNER's diesel shunters were delivered new to March; these featured a large switching board at the rear of their cab to enable them to be used as mobile power stations in the event of bomb damage, which affected local supplies. Due to locomotive examination problems caused by the wartime blackout, the shed was provided with an illuminated locomotive inspection pit, generally referred to as the Light Tunnel; this contained six rows of tube lights, two on either wall and one on either side of the pit. This remained in use until the end of steam.

A number of US Army Class S160 2-8-0s were allocated to the shed during 1943 and 1944 in the run-up to the invasion of Europe.

=== Dieselisation ===
With the arrival of diesel shunters, roads 1 and 2 were dedicated to their exclusive use. As more diesel locomotives entered service the first 4 roads were partitioned off, with all diesel maintenance and repairs taking place there. A total of forty Brush Type 2 diesels were based at the depot by the early 1960s. By that date, diesel locomotives were still fuelled at the old steam shed which lacked the spillage trays; this was changed in 1962 when a steel-framed diesel depot was built on the site of the original shed, complete with spillage trays and oil drainage facilities. In 1987, the 4 track extension to the original shed was also replaced by a purpose-built diesel facility.

The depot was closed in 1992 when the remaining Speedlink (wagon-load traffic) services were withdrawn, which left the facility with no work.

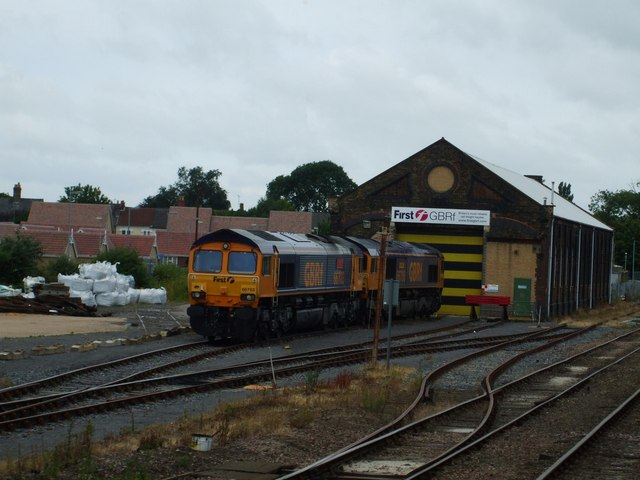
The new March Depot in 2008, with Class 66s stabled

However, after the neighbouring Whitemoor yard's re-opening in 2003, on 18 April 2008 GB Railfreight (a freight operating company and part of FirstGroup) officially opened their new depot in March. This is located in the former goods shed in the former Down yard to the east of March station and was opened by Ian Coucher, then chairman of Network Rail.

== Shed codes ==
The following shed codes have been used to identify locomotives allocated to March:

31B -	British Railways	from 1949
MR -	British Rail	from 1973
